= Children's Literature Festival at the University of Central Missouri =

Annual event in Missouri, United States

The Children's Literature Festival at the University of Central Missouri is the longest running children's literature festival in the United States that is geared toward children. It is a nationally recognized annual event that happens during the first weekend of March break at the University of Central Missouri in Warrensburg, Missouri. It runs for two and a half days and begins with a Sunday luncheon with guest speaker and is followed by two days of author presentations, primarily to children from area schools. The Children's Literature Festival allows children and adults to meet and interact with authors and illustrators whose books they have read or hope to read.

== Authors ==
The Children's Literature Festival features many Missouri authors and others from across the country. Every festival includes both authors new to the event and those who have participated previously.

== Participants ==
The Festival is aimed at students in grades 3–10. Groups come from public and private schools, as well as home schools. School districts of all sizes send groups of students; each group is accompanied by teachers and adult volunteers. Some travel a short distance while others travel for several hours to attend. Many districts and individual teachers have a long association with the Festival. The festival size has varied over the years. Two of the largest festivals took place in 2008, with 8000 participants, and 2010, with 6700 participants. Since 2015, approximately 4,000 adults and children participate annually.

== Volunteers ==
The Children's Literature Festival relies on approximately 100 volunteers each year. Volunteers include library faculty and staff, other UCM faculty and staff, Warrensburg High School Honor Society members, other high school and college students, and community members. Volunteers serve in many ways, including assisting authors, picking up authors at the Kansas City airport, transporting them to and from events, and overseeing the author hospitality area. Although many volunteers are local, some come from other parts of the state, or even out of state.

== Schedule ==
Registration and scheduling begin in January. The event kicks off with a Sunday luncheon with a guest speaker, usually one of the authors. Individuals interested in literature for young people are given the opportunity to select a seat at a table with an author or illustrator. Author and illustrator sessions take place Monday and Tuesday, with presenters speaking to groups of children and adults in 50-minute sessions. Groups can attend up to 5 sessions in a day. Book sales are open each day, giving participants an opportunity to purchase books to have signed at the end of each session. Authors usually present 3 or 4 sessions a day; they also have time to spend with other authors, socializing at lunch and during the evenings.

== History ==
The Children's Festival at the University of Central Missouri began in 1969 when Philip Sadler, Professor of Children's Literature, and Ophelia Gilbert, laboratory school librarian, invited five Missouri authors to speak to local students. In 2011, the Children's Literature Festival received a commendation from the American Association of School Librarians. From 2000 to 2015, Naomi Williamson was the Director of the Children's Literature Festival. In 2014, she received an Exemplary Community Achievement Award for her work on the Festival from the Missouri Humanities Council.

Year	Speaker(s)	Authors and Illustrators
1969	Jean Merrill	Gertrude Bell, Alberta Wilson Constant, Cena Christopher Draper, Rhoda Wooldridge, Wilma Yeo
1970	Lynn Hall	Evelyn Trent Bachman, Gertrude Bell, Page Carter, Alberta Wilson Constant, Elizabeth Gant, Katherine Gant, Lynn Hall, Aleda Renken, Helen Rushmore, Shirley Seifert, Marcella Thum, Rhoda Wooldridge, Wilma Yeo
1971	Berthe Daniel	Gertrude Bell, Clyde Robert Bulla, Cena Christopher Draper, Robert C. Lee, Edith McCall, Marian Potter, Aleda Renken, Rhoda Wooldridge, Wilma Yeo
1972	Madeleine L'Engle	Evelyn Trent Bachman, Gertrude Bell, Mary Calhoun, Alberta Wilson Constant, Harold Keith, Robert C. Lee, Madeleine L'Engle, Rhoda Wooldridge, Wilma Yeo
1973	Rebecca Caudill	James S. Ayars, Gertrude Bell, Rebecca Caudill, Ruth Collins, Miriam Fuller, Betty Horvath, Robert C. Lee, May McNeer, Lynd Ward, Rhoda Wooldridge, Wilma Yeo
1974	William O. Steele, Robert C. Lee	Patricia Minnis Barrows, Gertrude Bell, Ruth P. Collins, Cena Christopher Draper, Robert C. Lee, Aleda Renken, Mary Francis Shura, Mary Q. Steele, William O. Steele, Rhoda Wooldridge, Wilma Yeo
1975	E.L. Konigsburg	Gertrude Bell, Peter Burchard, Peter Z. Cohen, Alberta Wilson Constant, Loula Grace Erdman, Dorothy Francis, E.L. Konigsburg, Robert C. Lee, Berniece Rabe, Edith McCall, Rhoda Wooldridge, Wilma Yeo
1976	Jacqueline Jackson (Dinner), Leonard Wibberley (Awards)	Gertrude Bell, Mary Calhoun, Peter Z. Cohen, Alberta Wilson Constant, Mary Lois Dunn, Ed Emberley, Jacqueline Jackson, Harold Keith, Robert C. Lee, Edith McCall, Berniece Rabe, Leonard Wibberley, Rhoda Wooldridge, Wilma Yeo, Carol Beach York
1977	Mary Francis Shura (Dinner), Brinton Turkel (Awards)	Gertrude Bell, Ida Chittum, Dorothy B. Francis, Bette Green, Wilma P. Hays, Chrystal Jackson, Robert C. Lee, Katie Lecher Lyle, Gary Paulsen, Barbara Robinson, Mary Francis Shura, Theodore Taylor, Brinton Turkle, Maia Wojciechowska, Wilma Yeo
1978	Elleanor Cameron (Dinner), Scott Corbett (Awards)	Zachary Ball, Gertrude Bell, Eleanor Cameron, Ida Chittum, Peter Z. Cohen, David Collins, Alberta Wilson Constant, Helen Cook, Scott Corbett, Tomie de Paola, Jeannette Eyerly, David Harrison, Dean Hughes, Robert C. Lee, Gary Paulsen, Aleda Renken, Donald Sobol, Martha Bennett Stiles, Rhoda Wooldridge, Wilma Yeo
1979	Isabelle Holland (Dinner), Jean Karl (Awards)	Gertrude Bell, Peter Zachary Cohen, Alberta Wilson Constant, Cena Christopher Draper, Jean Craighead George, David Harrison, Isabelle Holland, Dean Hughes, Jean Karl, Robert C. Lee, David Melton, Charles and Elizabeth Schwartz, Zilpha K. Snyder, Lisl Weil, Rhoda Wooldridge, Wilma Yeo
1980	Robert Newton Peck (Dinner), Irene Hunt (Awards)	Gertrude Bell, Clyde Robert Bulla, Peter Z. Cohen, Eleanor Coerr, Alberta Wilson Constant, Julianna Fogel, Gail E. Haley, Lynn Hall, David Harrison, Dean Hughes, Irene Hunt, Robert C. Lee, David Melton, Jane Mobley, Robert Newton Peck, Stella Pevsner, Berneice Rabe, Judith St. George, Mary S. Watkins, Brenda Wilkinson, Rhoda Wooldridge, Wilma Yeo
1981	Lois Lowry (Dinner), Robert Burch (Awards)	Arnold Adoff, Sandy Asher, Avi, Dana Brookins, Clyde Robert Bulla, Robert Burch, Peter Zachary Cohen, Julia Cunningham, Juliana Fogel and Mary Watkins, David Harrison, Paula Hendrich, Dean Hughes, Robert C. Lee, Lois Lowry, Ellen Matthews, David Melton, Frances L. Meyer, Steve Scearcy, Rae Sedgwick, Doris B. Smith, Rhoda Wooldridge, Wilma Yeo
1982	Barbara Corcoran (Dinner), Betty Cavanna (Awards)	Sandy Asher, Margaret Baldwin, Gertrude Bell, Suzanne Bladow, Patricia Calvert, Betty Cavanna, Peter Z. Cohen, Alberta Wilson Constant, Barbara Corcoran (Paige Dixon), Julianna Fogel and Mary Watkins, David Harrison, Dean Hughes, Beverly H. Lee, Robert C. Lee, William MacKellar, Ron McReynolds, David Melton, Hilary Milton, Joan L. Nixon, Marian T. Place, Thomas Rockwell, Rae Sedgwick, Bill Wallace, Rhoda Wooldridge, Wilma Yeo
1983	Wilson Rawls (Dinner), Mary Stolz (Awards)	C. S. Adler, Sandy Asher, Margaret Baldwin, Gertrude Bell, Robbie Branscum, Patricia Calvert, Peter Z. Cohen, David Harrison, Dean Hughes, Beverly Lee, Robert C. Lee, David Melton, Thomas Millstead, Hilary Milton, Wilson Rawls, Rae Sedgwick, Mary F. Shura, Mary Stolz, Jane R. Thomas, Mary Watkins, Garth Williams, Rhoda Wooldridge, Wilma Yeo
1984	Garth Williams (Dinner), H.M. Hoover (Awards)	C. S. Adler, Sandy Asher, Gertrude Bell, T. Ernesto Bethancourt, Dana Brookins, Mary Calhoun, Patricia Calvert, Peter Z. Cohen, Irene Fitzgerald, Dorothy B. Francis, Jan Greenberg, David Harrison, H. M. Hoover, Dean Hughes, Stanley Kiesel, Beverly H. Lee, Robert C. Lee, David Melton, Berniece Rabe, Barbara Robinson, Raboo Rodgers, Helen R. Sattler, William Sleator, Jane R. Thomas, Bill Wallace, Garth Williams, Rhoda Wooldridge, Wilma Yeo
1985	T. Ernesto Bethancourt (Dinner), Elizabeth George Speare (Awards)	Sandy Asher, T. Ernesto Bethancourt, N. M. Bodecker, Robin Brancato, Eleanor Clymer, Susan Clymer, Peter Zachary Cohen, Jan Greenberg, Anita Gustafson, David Harrison, Kristi D. Holl, Dean Hughes, Carol Kendall, Robert C. Lee, David Melton, Raboo Rodgers, Lois Ruby, William Sleator, Elizabeth George Speare, Kathleen Thomas, Marilyn Wilkes, Garth Williams, Rhoda Wooldridge, Wilma Yeo
1986	Jack Prelutsky (Dinner), William Anderson (Awards)	William Anderson, Sandy Asher, Avi, Bill Britain, Dana Brookins, Patricia Calvert, Susan Clymer, Bernard Evslin, Dorothy B. Francis, Gyo Fujikawa, Jan Greenberg, David Harrison, Betsy Haynes, Kristi Holl, Dean Hughes, Carol Kendall, Robert C. Lee, Edith McCall, David Melton, Lila Perl, Kin Platt, Jack Prelutsky, Lois Ruby, Mary Francis Shura, William Sleator, Rhoda Wooldridge, Wilma Yeo
1987	Shirley Glubok (Dinner), Betsy Byars (Awards)	C. S. Adler, William Anderson, Avi, Marion Dane Bauer, T. E. Bethancourt, Bill Brittain, Dana Brookins, Clyde Robert Bulla, Robert Burch, Betsy Byars, Patricia Calvert, Carol Carrick, Bruce Clements, Gregory Denman, Barbara Esbensen, Shirley Glubok, Charlotte Graeber, Jan Greenberg, Betsy Haynes, Dean Hughes, Carol Kendall, Patricia Lauber, Robert C. Lee, Carolyn Lesser, Pat Rhodes Mauser, David Melton, Phyllis R. Naylor, Lila Perl, Raboo Rodgers, Vivian Schurfranz, Barbara Seuling, Lawrence Shles, William Sleator, Martha Bennett Stiles, Barbara Walker, Bill Wallace, Wilma Yeo
1988	Zilpha Keatley Snyder (Dinner), Ouida Sebestyen (Awards)	William Anderson, Sandy Asher, T. Ernesto Bethancourt, Dana Brookins, Clyde Robert Bulla, Patricia Calvert, Bruce Clements, Barbara Corcoran, Barbara Esbensen, Dorothy B. Francis, Jan Greenberg, Carol Greene, Vicki Grove, Mary Downing Hahn, Charles Hammer, David Harrison, Betsy Haynes, Kristi Holl, Dean Hughes, Carol Kendall, Jan Klaveness, Patricia R. Mauser, Edith McCall, David Melton, Arielle North Olson, Marian Potter, Barbara Robinson, Raboo Rodgers, Daniel San Souci, Ruth Sanderson, Vivian Schurfranz, Ouida Sebestyen, Mary Francis Shura, William Sleator, Zilpha Keatley Snyder, Martha Bennett Stiles, Todd Strasser, Mildred Pitts Walter, Maia Wojciechowska, Wilma Yeo
1989	Barbara Robinson, William Sleator	C. S. Adler, Thomas B. Allen, William Anderson, Sandy Asher, T. Ernesto Bethancourt, Gary L. Blackwood, Bill Brittain, Dana Brookins, Clyde Robert Bulla, Patricia Calvert, Barbara Corcoran, Julia Cunningham, Gary Denman, Ben Edelbaum, Vicki Berger Erwin, Jan Greenberg, Vicki Grove, Mary Downing Hahn, David Harrison, Betsy Haynes, Jim Haynes, Dean Hughes, Carol Kendall, Robert C. Lee, Patricia Rhoads Mauser, Kate McMullan, David Melton, Arielle North Olson, P. J. Petersen, Barbara Robinson, Ivy Ruckman, Louis Sachar, Daniel San Souci, Vivian Schurfranz, Ouida Sebestyen, William Sleator, Jan Resh Thomas, Marcia Wood, Wilma Yeo
1990	Eleanor Cameron (Dinner), Mary Francis Shura (Luncheon)	C. S. Adler, William Anderson, Sandy Asher, T. Ernesto Bethancourt, Gary L. Blackwood, Bill Brittain, Dana Brookins, Clyde Robert Bulla, Patricia Calvert, Eleanor Cameron, Julia Cunningham, Gregory Denman, Ben Edelbaum, Lisa Campbell Ernst, Barbara Esbensen, Jan Greenberg, Vicki Grove, Mary Downing Hahn, David Harrison, Betsy Haynes, Jim Haynes, Dean Hughes, Carol Kendall, Robert C. Lee (Friday), Patricia Rhoads Mauser, Kate McMullan, David Melton, Arielle North Olson, Bernal C. Payne, Jr., Susan Pearson, Anola Pickett (Saturday), Willo Davis Roberts, Raboo Rodgers, Ivy Ruckman, Vivian Schurfranz, Ouida Sebestyen, Mary Francis Shura, William Sleator, Jane Resh Thomas, Marcia Wood, Wilma Yeo
1991	Esther Hautzig (Dinner), Hadley Irwin (Luncheon)	C. S. Adler, William Anderson, Sandy Asher, Mary Jane Auch, T. Ernesto Bethancourt, Gary L. Blackwood, Clyde Robert Bulla, Robert Burch, Patricia Calvert, Carol Carrick, Gary Denman, Lisa Eisenberg, Bernard Evslin, Dorothy B. Francis, Jan Greenberg, Vicki Grove, Mary Downing Hahn, David Harrison, Esther Hautzig, Betsy Haynes, Jim Haynes, Dean Hughes, Hadley Irwin (Friday), Carol Kendall, Robert C. Lee (Thursday), Betsy Lewin, Ted Lewin, Patricia Rhoads Mauser, Kate McMullan, Arielle North Olson, P. J. Petersen, Berniece Rabe, Willo Davis Roberts, Ivy Ruckman, Ouida Sebestyen, Pamela Service, Garth Williams, G. Clifton Wisler, Wilma Yeo
1992	Emily Cheney Neville (Dinner), Harry Mazer (Luncheon)	C. S. Adler, William Anderson, Sandy Asher, Mary Jane Auch, T. Ernesto Bethancourt, Gary Blackwood, Candy Boyd, Dana Brookins, Clyde Robert Bulla, Patricia Calvert, Alden R. Carter, Bruce Clements, Susan Clymer, Diane de Groat, Barbara Esbensen, Vicki Grove, Mary Dorothy Haas, Downing Hahn, David Harrison, Kristi Holl Carol Kendall, Jan Klaveness, Patricia Rhoads Mauser, Harry Mazer, Kate McMullan, David Melton, Emily Cheney Neville, Arielle North Olson, P. J. Petersen, Ann Rinaldi, Barbara Robinson, Rhea Beth Ross, Ivy Ruckman, Vivian Schurfranz, Ouida Sebestyen, Pamela Service, Jane Resh Thomas, Garth Williams, G. Clifton Wisler, Marcia Wood, Wilma Yeo
1993	Peter Parnell (Dinner), Mary Downing Hahn (Luncheon)	C. S. Adler, Sandy Asher, Mary Jane Auch, Gary Blackwood, Clyde Robert Bulla, Patricia Calvert, Joan Carris, Jane Leslie Conly, Carol Fenner, Mary Downing Hahn, Patricia Hermes, Beth Hilgartner, Kristi Holl, Isabelle Holland, Ellen Howard, Dean Hughes, Carol Kendall, Jan Klaveness, Robert C. Lee, Reby Edmond MacDonald, Patricia Rhoads Mauser, Eloise Jarvis McGraw, Kate McMullan, Betty Miles, Arielle North Olson, Peter Parnall, Lila Perl, Carolyn Reeder, Willo Davis Roberts, Barbara Robinson, Rhea Beth Ross, Ivy Ruckman, Ouida Sebestyen, Zilpha Keatley Snyder, Stephanie Tolan, Patricia Willis, G. Clifton Wisler, June Rae Wood, Betty Ren Wright, Wilma Yeo
1994	Leonard Everett Fisher (Dinner), Jean Fritz (Luncheon)	C. S. Adler, William Anderson, Sandy Asher, Mary Jane Auch, T. Ernesto Bethancourt, Gary Blackwood, Candy Dawson Boyd, Robert Burch, Patricia Calvert, Joan Carris, Shirley Climo, Eleanor Coerr, Ellen Dolan, Vicki Berger Erwin, Barbara Esbensen, Leonard Everett Fisher, Jean Fritz, Jan Greenberg, Vicki Grove, David Harrison, Patricia Hermes, Beth Hilgartner, Isabelle Holland, Dean Hughes, Peg Kehret, Carol Kendall, Robert C. Lee, Patricia Rhoads Mauser, Arielle North Olson, Carolyn Reeder, Willo Davis Roberts, Barbara Robinson, Rhea Beth Ross, Ivy Ruckman, Vivian Schurfranz, Doris Buchanan Smith, Zilpha Keatley Snyder, Stephanie Tolan, Ann Tompert, Garth Williams, Patricia Willis, June Rae Wood, Wilma Yeo, Judy Dockery Young, Richard Young
1995	Fred Brenner (Dinner), Ouida Sebestyn (Luncheon)	C. S. Adler, William Anderson, Sandy Asher, Mary Jane Auch, Barbara Brenner, Fred Brenner, Bill Brittain, Clyde Robert Bulla, Robert Burch, Patricia Calvert, Joan Carris, Shirley Climo, Eleanor Coerr, Ellen Dolan, Barbara Esbensen, Carol Fenner, Jan Greenberg, Vicki Grove, Mary Downing Hahn, Cheryl Harness, David Harrison, Patricia Hermes, Isabelle Holland, Elizabeth Howard Ellen Howard, Dean Hughes, Carol Kendall, Robert C. Lee, Joseph Marshall III, Patricia Rhoads Mauser, Colleen Mckenna, Ben Mikaelsen, Mary Morgan, P. J. Petersen, Jennifer Plecas, Carolyn Reeder, Barbara Robinson, Ivy Ruckman, Vivian Schurfranz, Ouida Sebestyen, Pamela Service, Ann Tompert, G. Clifton Wisler, June Rae Wood
1996	Marc Simont (Dinner), Jeanne Betancourt (Luncheon)	C. S. Adler, William Anderson, Sandy Asher, Mary Jane Auch, Jeanne Betancourt, Candy Dawson Boyd, Barbara Brenner, Fred Brenner, Clyde Robert Bulla, Patricia Calvert, Joan Carris, Shirley Climo, Carol Fenner, Vicki Grove, Mary Downing Hahn, Cheryl Harness, Patricia Hermes, Isabelle Holland, Elizabeth Howard, Ellen Howard, Constance Hiser, Dean Hughes, Peg Kehret, Cal Kendall, Bruce Lansky, Joseph Marshall III, Patricia Rhoads Mauser, Colleen O'Shaughnessy McKenna, Kate McMullan, David Melton, Carolyn Reeder, Barbara Robinson, Lois Ruby, Ivy Ruckman, Pamela Service, Marc Simont, Zilpha Keatley Snyder, Stephanie Tolan, C. Clifton Wisler, June Rae Wood
1997	Stephen Roxburgh, Cheryl Harness, Patricia Hermes, Isabelle Holland	C. S. Adler, William Anderson, Sandy Asher, Mary Jane Auch, Clyde Robert Bulla, Patricia Calvert, Joan Carris, Shirley Climo, Jan Greenberg, Vicki Grove, Mary Downing Hahn, Cheryl Harness, David Harrison, Patricia Hermes, Constance Hiser, Isabelle Holland, Elizabeth Fitzgerald Howard, Dean Hughes, Carol Kendall, Constance Levy, Joseph M. Marshall III, David Melton, Claudia Mills, Carolyn Reeder, Barbara Robinson, Ivy Ruckman, Pamela Service, Ethel Footman Smothers, Jim "Two Crows" Wallen, G. Clifton Wisler, June Rae Wood
1998	Ann Rinaldi (Dinner), Phyllis Reynolds Naylor (Luncheon)	C. S. Adler, Caroline Arnold, Sandy Asher, Mary Jane Auch, Gary Blackwood, Candy Dawson Boyd, Dawna Lisa Buchanan, Clyde Robert Bulla, Patricia Calvert, Joan Carris, Shirley Climo, David Collins, Carol Fenner, Jan Greenberg, Vicki Grove, Mary Downing Hahn, Cheryl Harness, Madge Harrah, David Harrison, Patricia Hermes, Constance Hiser, Isabelle Holland, Dean Hughes, Carol Kendall, Constance Levy, David Melton, Ben Mikaelsen, Claudia Mills, Phyllis Reynolds Naylor, Berniece Rabe, Carolyn Reeder, Ann Rinaldi, Barbara Robinson, Ivy Ruckman, Ruth Sanderson, Brenda Seabrooke, Pamela Service, Gloria Skurzynski, Eleanora E. Tate, Jim "Two Crows" Wallen, G. Clifton Wisler, June Rae Wood
1999	Thomas B. Allen (Dinner), Joan Carris (Luncheon)	C. S. Adler, Thomas B. Allen, William Anderson, Dan Andreasen, Sandy Asher, Mary Jane Auch, Gary Blackwood, Dawna Lisa Buchanan, Clyde Robert Bulla, Patricia Calvert, Joan Carris, Shirley Climo, Carol Fenner, Jan Greenberg, Vicki Grove, Mary Downing Hahn, Cheryl Harness, Madge Harrah, David Harrison, Patricia Hermes, Constance Hiser, Isabelle Holland, Elizabeth Howard, Dean Hughes, Constance Levy, Edith McCall, David Melton, Carolyn Meyer, Claudia Mills, Susan Beth Pfeffer, Berniece Rabe, Barbara Robinson, Ivy Ruckman, Brenda Seabrooke, Pamela Service, Gloria Skurzynski, Vivian Vande Velde, Jim "Two Crows" Wallen, G. Clifton Wisler, June Rae Wood
2000	Roland Smith (Dinner)	C. S. Adler, R. W. Alley (Gallery Exhibit Illustrator), William Anderson, Dan Andreasen, Sandy Asher, Gary Blackwood, Beth Brust, Dawna Lisa Buchanan, Clyde Robert Bulla, Patricia Calvert, Joan Carris, Shirley Climo, Lisa Eisenberg, Carol Fenner, Jan Greenberg, Vicki Grove, Mary Downing Hahn, Madge Harrah, David Harrison, Patricia Hermes, Constance Hiser, Isabelle Holland, Lucinda Landon, Constance Levy, Edith McCall, Kate McMullan, David Melton, Carolyn Meyer, Claire Rudolf Murphy, Arielle North Olson, Berniece Rabe, Carolyn Reeder, Ann Rinaldi, Barbara Robinson, Ivy Ruckman, Brenda Seabrooke, Gloria Skurzynski, Teri Sloat, Roland Smith, C. Clifton Wisler, June Rae Wood
2001	Claudia Mills (Luncheon)	C. S. Adler, William Anderson, Marsha Diane Arnold, Sandy Asher, Mary Jane Auch, Gary Blackwood, Clyde Robert Bulla, Patricia Calvert, J. B. Cheaney, Sneed Collard, Margery Facklam, Jan Greenberg, Vicki Grove, Mary Downing Hahn, Madge Harrah, David Harrison, Patricia Hermes, Constance Hiser, Ellen Howard, Dean Hughes, V. Ted Hutchinson, Marian Isham, Steve Isham, Alexandria LaFaye, Dandi Mackall, Claudia Mills, Claire Rudolph Murphy, Dorinda Nicholson, P. J. Petersen, Barbara Robinson, Lois Ruby, Ivy Ruckman, Brenda Seabrooke, Teri Sloat, Roland Smith, Michele Spirn, Mike Thaler, Vivian Vande Velde, G. Clifton Wisler, June Rae Wood, Cheryl Harness (Exhibit Illustrator)
2002	Jane Kurtz (Luncheon)	C. S. Adler, R. W. Alley, William Anderson, Marsha Diane Arnold, Sandy Asher, Susan Campbell Bartoletti, Gary Blackwood, Larry Dane Brimner, Clyde Robert Bulla, Patricia Calvert, Joan Carris, J. B. Cheaney, Sneed Collard, Carol Fenner, Jan Greenberg, Vicki Grove, Mary Downing Hahn, Cheryl Harness, Madge Harrah, David Harrison, Patricia Hermes, Isabelle Holland, Steve Isham, Veda Boyd Jones, Natalie Kinsey-Warnock, Jane Kurtz, Alexandria LaFaye, Gail Carson Levine, David Melton, Claudia Mills, Dorinda Nicholson, P. J. Petersen, Carolyn Reeder, Barbara Robinson, Ron Roy, Ivy Ruckman, Brenda Seabrooke, Gloria Skurzynski, Teri Sloat, Roland Smith, Brad Sneed, George Edward Stanley, Stephanie Tolan, Vivian Vande Velde, Jenny Whitehead, G. Clifton Wisler, June Rae Wood, Rebecca Woolf
2003	Peter Lourie (Luncheon)	C. S. Adler, R. W. Alley, William Anderson, Sandy Asher, Gary Blackwood, Clyde Robert Bulla, Patricia Calvert, Joan Carris, Mary Casanova, J. B. Cheaney, Carol Crane, Dennis Fradin, Judith Fradin, Jan Greenberg, Vicki Grove, Mary Downing Hahn, Wendy Anderson Halperin, Cheryl Harness, Madge Harrah, David Harrison, Patricia Hermes, Hillary Homzie, Dean Hughes, Laura Huliska-Beith, Jeanette Ingold, Meredith Johnson, Alexandria LaFaye, Peter Lourie, Dandi D. Mackall, Kate McMullan, Claudia Mills, Claire Rudolf Murphy, Dorinda Nicholson, Judy Oetting, P. J. Petersen, Barbara Robinson, Lois Ruby, Ivy Ruckman, Robert San Souci, Brenda Seabrooke, Pamela Service, Gloria Skurzynski, Joseph Slate, Teri Sloat, Brad Sneed, Mike Thaler, Vivian Vande Velde, June Rae Wood
2004	David Harrison (Luncheon)	C. S. Adler, R. W. Alley, William Anderson, Sandy Asher, Gary Blackwood, Clyde Robert Bulla, Patricia Calvert, Mary Casanova, J. B. Cheaney, Eileen Christelow, Henry Cole, Sneed Collard, Pamela Duncan Edwards, Dennis Fradin, Judith Fradin, Jan Greenberg, Rhonda Gowler Greene, Vicki Grove, Mary Downing Hahn, Cheryl Harness, Madge Harrah, David Harrison, Patricia Hermes, Ard Hoyt, Jeanette Ingold, Veda Boyd Jones, Jane Kurtz, Alexandria LaFaye, Steven Layne, Kate McMullen, Claudia Mills, Dorinda Nicholson, Tracey Campbell Pearson, P. J. Petersen, Carolyn Reeder, Barbara Robinson, Ivy Ruckman, Brenda Seabrooke, Gloria Skurzynski, Marie Smith, Roland Smith, Michael Spradlin, Jana Striegel, Vivian Vande Velde, June Rae Wood
2005	Gloria Skurzynski and Alane Ferguson (Luncheon)	C. S. Adler, William Anderson, Marsha Diane Arnold, Sandy Asher, Gary Blackwood, Clyde Robert Bulla, Patricia Calvert, Elisa Carbone, Joan Carris, Mary Casanova, J. B. Cheaney, Chris Crowe, Alane Ferguson, Carol Gorman, Vicki Grove, Mary Downing Hahn, Cheryl Harness, Madge Harrah, David Harrison, Patricia Hermes, Ard Hoyt, Jeanette Ingold, Barbara Kerley, Lee Kochenderfer, Alexandria LaFaye, Patricia Mauser McCord, Kate McMullan, Claudia Mills, Dorinda Nicholson, P. J. Petersen, Candice Ransom, Carolyn Reeder, Barbara Robinson, Ivy Ruckman, Barbara Santucci, Brenda Seabrooke, Gloria Skurzynski, Roland Smith, Brad Sneed, Michael Spradlin, Jennifer J. Stewart, Stephanie Tolan, Vivian Vande Velde, June Rae Wood
2006	Sandy Asher (Luncheon)	C. S. Adler, R. W. Alley, William Anderson, Sandy Asher, Gary Blackwood, Robin Brickman, Clyde Robert Bulla, Dori Butler, Elisa Carbone, J. B. Cheaney, Sneed Collard, Alane Ferguson, Eugene Gagliano, Carol Gorman, Jan Greenberg, Vicki Grove, Mary Downing Hahn, Cheryl Harness, Madge Harrah, David Harrison, Patricia Hermes, Ard Hoyt, Jeanette Ingold, Alexandria LaFaye, Constance Levy, Patricia Mauser McCord, Claudia Mills, Dorinda Nicholson, P. J. Petersen, Carolyn Reeder, Barbara Robinson, Lois Ruby, Ivy Ruckman, Brenda Seabrooke, Gloria Skurzynski, Teri Sloat, Brad Sneed, Michael Spradlin, Jennifer J. Stewart, Stephanie Tolan, Vivian Vande Velde, June Rae Wood, Lisa Yee, Judy Young
2007	Terry Trueman (Luncheon)	C. S. Adler, William Anderson, Patricia Calvert, Janet Lee Carey, Joan Carris, Mary Casanova, J. B. Cheaney, Michael Daley, Alane Ferguson, Dennis Fradin, Carol Gorman, Vicki Grove, Jessie Haas, Mary Downing Hahn, Cheryl Harness, David Harrison, Patricia Hermes, Richard Jennings, Jeanette Ingold, Alexandria LaFaye, Kirby Larson, Constance Levy, D. Anne Love, Dandi Daley Mackall, Claudia Mills, Dorinda Nicholson, Jerry Pallotta, P. J. Petersen, Barbara Robinson, Brenda Seabrooke, Gloria Skurzynski, Marie Smith, Roland Smith, Brad Sneed, Michael Spradlin, Stephanie Tolan, Roderick Townley, Terry Trueman, Vivian Vande Velde, Lea Wait, Wendy Watson, June Rae Wood
2008	David Harrison, Sandy Asher, Patricia Calvert, C. S. Adler, Dean Hughes	C. S. Adler, R. W. Alley, William Anderson, Marsha Diane Arnold, Sandy Asher, Herm Auch, Mary Jane Auch, Gary Blackwood, Patricia Calvert, Joan Carris, Mary Casanova, J. B. Cheaney, Sneed Collard, Alane Ferguson, Dennis Fradin, Jan Greenberg, Vicki Grove, Mary Downing Hahn, Cheryl Harness, David Harrison, Patricia Hermes, Ard Hoyt, Dean Hughes, Jeanette Ingold, Richard Jennings, Veda Boyd Jones, Kate McMullan, Claudia Mills, Dorinda Nicholson, P. J. Petersen, Carolyn Reeder, Barbara Robinson, Brenda Seabrooke, Gloria Skurzynski, Teri Sloat, Marie Smith, Roland Smith, Brad Sneed, Michael Spradlin, Mike Thaler, Roderick Townley, Terry Trueman, Vivian Vande Velde, June Rae Wood
2009	Patricia Hermes (Luncheon)	C. S. Adler, William Anderson, Herm Auch, Mary Jane Auch, Robin Brickman, Dan Burr, Elisa Carbone, Mary Casanova, Susan Casey, J. B. Cheaney, Sneed Collard, Jill Esbaum, Alane Ferguson, Shelley Gill, Carol Gorman, Jan Greenberg, Vicki Grove, Mary Downing Hahn, Kelly Milner Halls, Cheryl Harness, David Harrison, Patricia Hermes, Richard Jennings, Veda Boyd Jones, Jane Kurtz, Alexandria LaFaye, Kirby Larson, Claudia Mills, P. J. Petersen, Barbara Robinson, Brenda Seabrooke, Michael Shoulders, Gloria Skurzynski, Marie Smith, Roland Smith, Brad Sneed, Michael Spradlin, Stephanie Tolan, Roderick Townley, Terry Trueman, Vivian Vande Velde, Lea Wait, June Rae Wood, Leslie Wyatt, Judy Young
2010	Cheryl Klein (Luncheon)	William Anderson, Sandy Asher, Darleen Bailey Beard, Gary Blackwood, Joan Carris, J. B. Cheaney, Eileen Christelow, Sneed Collard, Shane Evans, Alane Ferguson, Judith Fradin, Michael Graf, Jan Greenberg, Vicki Grove, Mary Downing Hahn, Cheryl Harness, David Harrison, Patricia Hermes, Jeanette Ingold, Richard Jennings, Veda Boyd Jones, Peg Kehret, Alexandria LaFaye, Dandi Daley Mackall, Claudia Mills, Anna Myers, Dorinda Nicholson, Marc Tyler Nobleman, P. J. Petersen, Barbara Robinson, Brenda Seabrooke, Gloria Skurzynski, Marie Smith, Roland Smith, Brad Sneed, Michael Spradlin, Roderick Townley, Terry Trueman, Vivian Vande Velde, Suzanne Williams, June Rae Wood
2011	Michael Spradlin (Luncheon)	C. S. Adler, R. W. Alley, William Anderson, Marsha Diane Arnold, Sandy Asher, J. B. Cheaney, Henry Cole, Sneed Collard, Michael Daley, Diane deGroat, Matthew Faulkner, Alane Ferguson, Vicki Grove, Jessie Haas, Mary Downing Hahn, Cheryl Harness, David Harrison, Patricia Hermes, Jeanette Ingold, Richard Jennings, James Kennedy, Alexandria LaFaye, Kate McMullan, Claudia Mills, N. A. Nelson, Dorinda Nicholson, Barbara Robinson, Teri Sloat, Marie Smith, Roland Smith, Brad Sneed, Michael Spradlin, Jennifer J. Stewart, Stephanie Tolan, Roderick Townley, Terry Trueman, Vivian Vande Velde, June Rae Wood
2012	Mary Casanova and Ard Hoyt (Luncheon)	C. S. Adler, William Anderson, Marlene Brill, Elizabeth C. Bunce, Elisa Carbone, Janet Carey, Mary Casanova, Henry Cole, Sneed Collard, Jan Greenberg, Cheryl Harness, David Harrison, Patricia Hermes, Ard Hoyt, Jeanette Ingold, Antony John, Veda Boyd Jones, Brian Katcher, Alexandria LaFaye, Claudia Mills, Dorinda Nicholson, Lois Ruby, Ruth Sanderson, Marie Smith, Roland Smith, Brad Sneed, Michael Spradlin, Stephanie Tolan, Roderick Townley, Terry Trueman, Vivian Vande Velde, June Rae Wood, Leslie Wyatt, Judy Young
2013	Dandi Mackall	C. S. Adler, R.W. Alley, Zoë Alley, William Anderson, Caroline Arnold, Sandy Asher, Herm Auch, Mary Jane Auch, Darleen Bailey Beard, Larry Dane Brimner, Joan Carris, Mary Casanova, Henry Cole, Sneed Collard, Alane Ferguson, Judith Fradin, Michael Graf, Jan Greenberg, Mary Downing Hahn, Kelly Milner Halls, Cheryl Harness, David Harrison, Patricia Hermes, Ard Hoyt, Antony John, Veda Boyd Jones, Alexandria LaFaye, Dandi Daley Mackall, Claudia Mills, Dorinda Nicholson, Marc Tyler Nobleman, Brenda Seabrooke, Marie Smith, Roland Smith, Brad Sneed, Michael Spradlin, Stephanie Tolan, Roderick Townley, Terry Trueman, Vivian Vande Velde, June Rae Wood
2014	Henry Cole (Luncheon)	C. S. Adler, William Anderson, Mary Casanova, Claire Caterer, J. B. Cheaney, Henry Cole, Sneed Collard, Jan Greenberg, Vicki Grove, Mary Downing Hahn, Kelly Milner Halls, Cheryl Harness, David Harrison, Marsha Hayles, Patricia Hermes, Ard Hoyt, Antony John, Veda Boyd Jones, Brian Katcher, James Kennedy, Michelle Markel, Claudia Mills, Dorinda Nicholson, Brenda Seabrooke, Regina Sirois, Obert Skye, Marie Smith, Roland Smith, Brad Sneed, Michael Spradlin, Stephanie Tolan, Roderick Townley, Terry Trueman, Vivian Vande Velde, June Rae Wood
2015	Deborah Hopkinson (Luncheon)	C. S. Adler, William Anderson, Sandy Asher, Varsha Bajaj, Laurie Calkhoven, Mary Casanova, J. B. Cheaney, Henry Cole, Sneed Collard, Judith Fradin, Jan Greenberg, Mary Downing Hahn, Cheryl Harness, David Harrison, Patricia Hermes, Deborah Hopkinson, Ard Hoyt, Antony John, Sandra Jordan, Brian Katcher, Jane Kurtz, Claudia Mills, Claire Rudolf Murphy, Dorinda Nicholson, Lois Ruby, Ruth Sanderson, Obert Skye, Marie Smith, Roland Smith, Brad Sneed, Michael Spradlin, Roderick Townley, Vivian Vande Velde, June Rae Wood
2016	Susan Campbell Bartoletti	C.S. Adler, William Anderson, Susan Campbell Bartoletti, Mary Casanova, Claire Caterer, J.B. Cheaney, Henry Cole, Sneed Collard, Chris Crutcher, Michael Graf, Kelly Milner Halls, Cheryl Harness, Ard Hoyt, Antony John, Stephen Johnson, Brian Katcher, Kate McMullan, Kate Milford, Claudia Mills, Dorinda Nicholson, Obert Skye, Marie Smith, Roland Smith, Brad Sneed, Michael Spradlin, Roderick Townley, Vivian Vande Velde, June Rae Wood, Leslie Wyatt
2017	Gennifer Choldenko	R. W. Alley, William Anderson, Phil Bildner, S. A. Bodeen, Mary Casanova, Angela Cervantes, Gennifer Choldenko, Mary Downing Hahn, Cheryl Harness, Janice N. Harrington, David L. Harrison, Ard Hoyt, Antony John, Stephen Johnson, Meg Kearney, E. B. Lewis, Kate Milford, Claudia Mills, Margi Preus, Roland Smith, Brad Sneed, Michael Spradlin, Christine Taylor-Butler, Roderick Townley
2018	Jack Gantos (Luncheon)	William Anderson, Elizabeth Baddeley, Chris Barton, Phil Bildner, Mary Casanova, Angela Cervantes, J. B. Cheaney, Brandy Colbert, Alan Gratz, Mary Downing Hahn, Kelly Milner Halls, Cheryl Harness, David L. Harrison, Raúl Gonzalez III, Antony John, Mike Jung, Brian Katcher, Fonda Lee, E. B. Lewis, Sue Macy, John Marciano, Marc Tyler Nobleman, Matt Phelan, Obert Skye, Roland Smith, Brad Sneed, Christine Taylor-Butler, Roderick Townley, Beth Vrabel
2019	E. B. Lewis (Luncheon)	Selina Alko, Crystal Allen, Avi, Phil Bildner, Kendare Blake, H. M. Bouwman, Mary Casanova, Angela Cervantes, Sneed Collard, Karina Yan Glaser, Paul Griffin, Kelly Milner Halls, Ard Hoyt, Raúl Gonzalez III, Tiffany D. Jackson, Antony John, Stephen Johnson, Adib Khorram, E.B. Lewis, Dorinda Nicholson, Marc Tyler Nobleman, Gary Schmidt, Ray Anthony Shepard, Obert Skye, Roland Smith, Laurel Snyder, Shadra D. Strickland, Christine Taylor-Butler, Tim Tingle, Beth Vrabel, Jennifer Wang
2020	None	2020 festival cancelled due to coronavirus pandemic
2021	Virtual festival due to COVID-19 pandemic	Mary Downing Hahn, April Henry, Gordon Korman, Veera Hiranandani, Antony John, Torrey Maldonado, Jewell Parker Rhodes, Roland Smith, Beth Vrabel, Kelly Yang
2022	No luncheon due to smaller nature of the Festival	Phil Bildner, Mary Downing Hahn (virtual), Antony John, Janae Marks, Roland Smith, Padma Venkatraman, Beth Vrabel, Jasmine Warga
2023	Gary Schmidt (Luncheon)	Dusti Bowling, Pablo Cartaya, Sneed Collard, Adrianna Cuevas, Samantha Edwards, Lisa Fipps, Paul Griffin, Mary Downing Hahn (virtual), John Hendrix, Antony John, Stephen T. Johnson, Angela Joy, Dorinda Nicholson, Mark Oshiro, Mae Respicio, Gary Schmidt, Wendy Shang, Ray Anthony Shepard, Roland Smith, Padma Venkatraman, Beth Vrabel, Sarah Warren, Carole Boston Weatherford
2024	Padma Venkatraman	Crystal Allen, Chris Barton, H.M. Bouwman, Dusti Bowling, Roseanne A. Brown, Rob Buyea, Pablo Cartaya, Angela Cervantes, Saadia Faruqi, Karina Yan Glaser, Mary Downing Hahn, Janice Harrington, Adib Khorram, Niki Lenz, Sharee Miller, Daniel Nayeri, Rory Power, Gary Schmidt, Ronald Smith, Roland Smith, Padma Venkatraman, Beth Vrabel, Jennifer Ziegler
2025	Pablo Cartaya	Varsha Bajaj, Kelly Barnhill, Pablo Cartaya, Mary Downing Hahn, Leah Henderson, Natalie Lloyd, Pedro Martín, Dorinda Nicholson, Celia Peréz, Tom Phillips, Lilliam Rivera, Sarah Sax, Gary Schmidt, Roland Smith, Traci Sorell, Melissa Stewart, Erin Stewart, Aiden Thomas, Roderick Townley, Grace Townley, Andrea Wang, Jeff Zentner
2026	Roland Smith	Donna Barba Higuera, Rob Buyea, Pablo Cartaya, Angela Cervantes, Ruth Chan, Jared Chapman, Traci Chee, Dan Gemeinhart, Byron Graves, Mary Downing Hahn (virtual), Meg Eden Kuyatt, Lindsay Lackey, Katherine Marsh, Meg Medina, Kiyash Monsef, Annabelle Oh, Mark Oshiro, Olugbemisola Rhuday-Perkovich, Ally Russell, Gary Schmidt, Erin Stewart, Dave Valeza, Sherri Winston, Karina Yan Glaser
