= The Christopher Killer =

2006 novel by Alane Ferguson

- Author: Alane Ferguson
- Language: English
- Series: Forensic Mystery
- Genre: Mystery
- Publisher: Penguin Books
- Publication date: May 4, 2006
- Publication place: United States
- Pages: 288 pp (hardback & paperback)
- Followed by: The Angel of Death

The Christopher Killer is a mystery novel by Alane Ferguson set in the small town of Silverton, Colorado. The book centers around Cameryn who is the assistant to her coroner father. It was released on May 4, 2006 in the United States. The book was an Edgar Award Nominee in 2007. It is held in over one thousand WorldCat libraries

Following the release of this book, Alane Ferguson went on to write three additional titles in the Forensic Mysteries series: The Angel of Death (2008), The Circle of Blood (2008), and The Dying Breath (2009). Each of these works delves further into the character of Cameryn Mahoney, assistant to the coroner, and her personal and professional connections in Silverton, Colorado. While each can be read as a standalone novel, The Angel of Death and The Dying Breath feature a continuing storyline with a suspect. Alane Ferguson ended the series with The Dying Breath. She credits her accuracy in forensic investigations to extensive research done on the topic.

== Characters ==
- Cameryn Mahoney - A seventeen-year-old (high school senior) girl who is the kid of the Silverton coroner. She also goes by the nickname Cammie. Her dream is to follow in her father's footsteps and become a forensic pathologist. Cameryn has studied multiple books on forensics, which her Mammaw disapproves of. After convincing her father to let her be his assistant, she gets an inside look at the world of forensics. Cameryn lives with her crazy Mammaw's in her house, and can not remember ever having seen her mother. Cameryn has a second job at the Grand Hotel. It is implied that she is attracted to Justin Crowley.
- Patrick Mahoney - the father of Cameryn Mahoney and the Silverton coroner. At first, he is reluctant to accept Cameryn as the assistant to the coroner. But he soon gives in and is extremely impressed with her observations on their first case together. He highly dislikes Justin, the new deputy.
- Justin Crowley - the new deputy of the town who is twenty-one years old. He originally comes from Albany, New York and found his current job of deputy over the Internet. Later on, Cameryn finds out he knew the artist Hannah Peterson, her mother, who she has never set eyes on. Justin met Hannah at a party thrown by his brother and sister-in-law. Hannah gave him a painting and a letter was supposed to be given to Cameryn at the right time. He cares a lot about Cameryn and her safety.
- Sheriff Jacobs - Silverton's sheriff. He always emanates disapproval towards Cameryn every time she is at a crime scene. He acknowledges that there is something between Cameryn and Justin.
- Dr. Moore - the nearest forensic pathologist to which any victims can be brought. He is very hot-tempered and believes himself to be the 'captain of the ship'. So he doesn't enjoy it when Cameryn states she sees something, which was unseen to him and he implies that she is only an amateur. He enjoys listening to opera music while performing autopsies.
- Raymond Jewel - world-renowned psychic. He is the one who first claimed to have seen the spirit of Rachel telling him the details of her whereabouts. His description was proven right when Rachel was found in Silverton. He is commonly known by his last name, Jewel.
- Rachel Geller - a fellow server at the Grand, and the unfortunate victim of a serial killer.
- Mammaw - Cameryn's paternal Irish grandmother. She disagrees with Cammie on her choice of future profession and tries many times to change her granddaughter's mind to no avail.
- Hannah Peterson - the mother of Cameryn. She has never come to visit Cameryn since their separation, due to fear of rejection, although she wishes to. Hannah sought the help of Justin to soften Cameryn up before trying to visit. She is an avid painter, so she sends a painting to Cammie as well as a letter.
- Lyric Daphne - Cameryn's best friend since the fifth-grade. She is the exact opposite of Cameryn, so their friendship is an unlikely one. Lyric is very loud, believes in mystics, and wears clothes that are bright and set to her mood. She is very eccentric and gives off a mystical vibe.
- Adam Stinson - is the weird kid in Silverton. He wears all black, smokes, and keeps to himself all the time. Adam adores Rachel Geller and has pictures of her in the basement of his job for their school yearbook . At one point he is suspected to have killed Rachel due to his possession of pictures of her.
