= Playing with Matches =

Playing with Matches may refer to:

- "Playing with Matches" (Ally McBeal), a 2002 television episode
- "Playing with Matches" (CSI: NY), a 2008 television episode
- "Playing with Matches" (Roseanne), a 1993 television episode
- Playing with Matches, a 1987 novel by Judith Arnold
- Playing with Matches, a 2008 young-adult novel by Brian Katcher
