= Schwertfeger =

Schwertfeger or Schwerdtfeger is a German surname:

- E. Anne Schwerdtfeger (1930-2008), American composer
- Kai Schwertfeger (b. 1988), a German football player
- Theodor Schwertfeger (ca. 1680 – after 1739), was a German architect, worked in St Petersburg, Russia
- Carole Schwerdtfeger (more known by pseudonym "C. S. Adler"; b. 1932), is an American children's book author.
- Hans Wilhelm Eduard Schwerdtfeger (1902–1990), was a German-Canadian-Australian mathematician
- Peter Schwerdtfeger (b. 1955), is a chemist

== See also ==
- Mount Schwerdtfeger, a mountain in Antarctica; it is named after Werner Schwerdtfeger
