= Little Theatre of Alexandria =

Community theatre in Alexandria, Virginia

Coordinates: 38°48′4.7″N 77°2′48.7″W

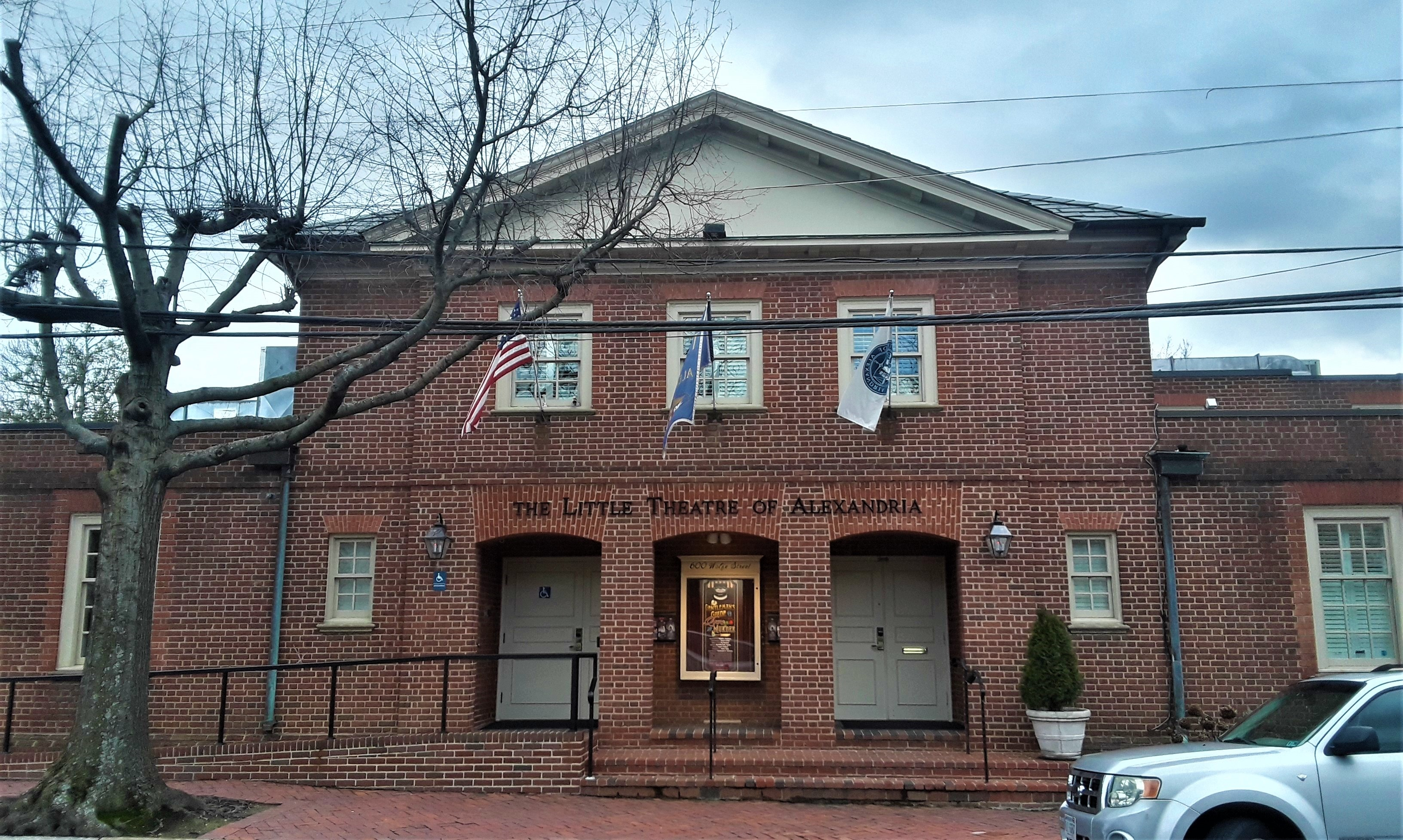
Entrance of the Little Theatre in 2020

The Little Theatre of Alexandria is a community theatre located at 600 Wolfe Street in Alexandria, Virginia. It was founded by Mary Lindsey in 1934 and was originally known as the Peacock Players. It has since staged more than 350 productions. During recent years it has produced seven to ten shows each season and is particularly well known for its one-act playwriting competition.

President George Bush Jr. attended the Little Theatre as his first cultural event with First Lady Laura on 28 June 2001, when they saw the Alexandria production of Neil Simon's Proposals; their relative Margaret played a role in the show.

It has played an important role in launching the careers of playwrights such as Sandra Fenichel Asher, Rich Orloff, and Jacob M. Appel.

The theatre has a member/subscriber base of over 2,000 and owns its own building, which was opened as a theatre in 1961.
