= Sandra Fenichel Asher =

American dramatist

Sandra Fenichel Asher is an American author and playwright, known most notably for her contributions to the fields of children's theater and literature. She has written over 30 novels and stories, but is most well known for her plays such as A Woman Called Truth and In the Garden of the Selfish Giant.

== Education ==
Asher attended Indiana University Bloomington where she completed a B.A. in English with a minor in Theatre in 1964. In 1974 she received her Elementary Education Certification from Drury University.

== Novels and stories ==
=== Young adult novels ===
Title	Publication year	Notes
Summer Begins	1980	Later in paperback as Summer Smith Begins.
Daughters of the Law	1980	
Just Like Jenny	1982	Junior Library Guild Selection (1982), Mark Twain Award Master List (1984)
Things Are Seldom What They Seem	1983	Junior Library Guild Selection (1983), Iowa Teen Award Master List (1987), Young Hoosier Award Master List (1987)
Missing Pieces	1984	
Everything is Not Enough	1987	Junior Library Guild Selection (1987)
Out of Here: A Senior Class Yearbook	1993	YA Read-Alouds Too Good to Miss, Indiana (1996)

=== Beginning Reader Series: Ballet One ===
Title	Publication year
Best Friends Get Better	1989
Pat's Promise	1990
Mary in the Middle	1990
Can David Do It?	1991

=== Chapter books ===
Title	Publication year
Teddy Teabury's Fabulous Fact	1985
Teddy Teabury's Peanutty Problems	1989

=== Children's picture books ===
Title	Publication year	Notes
Princess Bee and the Royal Goodnight Story	1989	Illustrated by Cat Bowman Smith.
Stella's Dancing Days	2001	Illustrated by Kathryn Brown.
Why Rabbit's Nose Twitches	2004	Illustrated by Allan Eitzen.
Too Many Frogs!	2005	Illustrated by Keith Graves. New York Library Association "Best of Season" Master List (2005), Florida Reading Association Children's Book Award Honor Book (2006), Keystone State Reading Association Keystone to Reading Master List (2006), North Dakota Flicker Tale Award (2006), South Carolina School Library Book Award Master List (2006), Texas Library Association 2x2 List (2006), Montana Treasure State Book Award Master List (2007), Wyoming Buckaroo Award Master List (2007), Georgia Picture Story Book Award Master List (2008), South Dakota Librarians' 100 Best Books for Children List (2008)
What a Party!	2007	Illustrated by Keith Graves.
Here Comes Gosling!	2009	Illustrated by Keith Graves.

=== Books for writers ===
Title	Publication year
Where Do You Get Your Ideas?	1987
Wild Words: How to Train Them to Tell Stories	1989
Writing It Right: How Successful Children's Authors Revise and Sell their Stories	2009

=== Non-fiction books ===
Title	Publication year
The Great American Peanut Book	1997
Discovering Cultures: China	2002
Discovering Cultures: Mexico	2002

== Plays ==
Title	Publication year	Publisher	Notes
Little Old Ladies in Tennis Shoes	1989	Dramatic Publishing Company	ATA Senior Citizens Project New Plays List (1982), Ellis Memorial Award Finalist, Theatre Americana (1987), Maxwell Anderson Playwriting Series: Best Play of New Season (1986)
The Wise Men of Chelin	1992	Dramatic Publishing Company	
A Woman Called Truth	1993	Dramatic Publishing Company	National Playwrights' Showcase, First Prize (1987), Bonderman Award (1989), Joseph Campbell Memorial Award (1992), AATE Distinguished Play Award (1994)
Dancing With Strangers	1994	Dramatic Publishing Company	
Sunday, Sunday	1994	Dramatic Publishing Company	Little Theatre of Alexandria One Act Play Contest, First Prize (1983), Street Players Theatre Contest, First Prize (1989), Actors' Guild of Lexington New Play Festival Winner (1992)
Once, in the Time of Trolls	1995	Dramatic Publishing Company	Children's Musical Theatre of Mobile Contest, First Prize (1984), Dubuque Fine Arts Players Contest, First Prize (1984), East Central College Contest, First Prize (1993)
Emma	1997	Dramatic Publishing Company	Adapted from the Jane Austen novel of the same name.
I Will Sing Life: Voices from the Hole in the Wall Gang Camp	2000	Dramatic Publishing Company	Adapted from the Larry Berger and Dahlia Lithwick book of the same name.
Little Women: Meg, Jo, Beth, and Amy	2001	Dramatic Publishing Company	Adapted from the Louisa May Alcott novel of the same name.
Blackbirds and Dragons, Mermaids and Mice	2003	Dramatic Publishing Company	
Waiting for Bobo	2004	Dramatic Publishing Company	
In the Garden of the Selfish Giant	2004	Dramatic Publishing Company	Bonderman Award (2001), New England Theatre Conference Aurand Harris Award (2003), AATE Distinguished Play Award (2004)
Romeo and Juliet - Together (and Alive!) at Last	2004	Dramatic Publishing Company	Adapted from the Avi novel of the same name.
Somebody Catch My Homework	2004	Dramatic Publishing Company	Inspired by the poetry of David L. Harrison.
We Will Remember: A Tribute to Veterans	2005	Dramatic Publishing Company	
Everything Is Not Enough	2006	Dramatic Publishing Company	Adapted from her own book of the same name.
Today I Am: Five Short Plays About Growing Up Jewish	2006	Dramatic Publishing Company	
Too Many Frogs!	2007	Dramatic Publishing Company	Adapted from her own book of the same name.
Family Matters	2008	Dramatic Publishing Company	
To Life! Growing Up Jewish In America	2008	Dramatic Publishing Company	
Keeping Mr. Lincoln	2009	Dramatic Publishing Company	
Jesse and Grace: A Best Friends Story	2010	Dramatic Publishing Company	Based on poems by David L. Harrison.
The Ballad of Two Who Flew	1976	Plays Magazine	
Witling and the Stone Princess	1979	Plays Magazine	
The Golden Cow of Chelm	1980	Plays Magazine	
Who Will Bell the Cat?	1992	Scott Foresman Text	
The Wolf and Its Shadows	1998	Anchorage Press Plays	AATE Unpublished Play Reading Project Winner (1994), Bonderman Award (1995)

== Critical reception ==
A Woman Called Truth, a play based on the life of Sojourner Truth, is perhaps Asher's most recognized stage-play. The New York Times called it a "smart, strong play", stating that it "is bound to make young viewers believe that changes are indeed possible".
