= The Man Who Loved Clowns =

Book by June Rae Wood

- Author: June Rae Wood
- Language: English
- Publisher: G. P. Putnam's Sons
- ISBN: 0-399-21888-2

The Man Who Loved Clowns is a 1992 novel by June Rae Wood about coping with mental disability in the family. The story is based on Wood's personal experience of life with her brother Richard who himself had Down syndrome. Wood also wrote a sequel, entitled Turtle on a Fence Post, set one year later.

== Awards ==
- 1995 Mark Twain Award in Missouri
- 1995 William Allen White Award in Kansas

== See also ==
- A Corner of the Universe by Ann M. Martin, a novel with a similar theme

Awards
Preceded by Shiloh	Winner of the William Allen White Children's Book Award; 1995	Succeeded by The Giver
Preceded by Shiloh	Mark Twain Award; 1995	Succeeded by Ghosts of Mercy Manor
