= Stuck in Neutral =

Book by Terry Trueman

- Author: Terry Trueman
- Language: English
- Publisher: HarperTeen
- Publication date: October 9, 2001
- Pages: 114
- ISBN: 978-0-06-447213-5
- OCLC: 48164952

Stuck in Neutral is a young adult novel by Terry Trueman. It focuses deeply on the subject of cerebral palsy, quality of life, and euthanasia. The main character is Shawn McDaniel, a fourteen-year-old who has cerebral palsy. The story, told from Shawn's perspective, also focuses on how his family copes with the condition. Shawn's mother, brother, sister, and father are all talked about in the book. Stuck in Neutral received recognition as an Honor Book for the Michael L. Printz Award in 2001.

Trueman wrote the novel because his own son has been diagnosed with cerebral palsy, and he wanted to educate young readers both about the condition and about showing tolerance for those with severe disabilities.

== Plot summary ==
The book follows Shawn McDaniel's first-person point of view. He is a 14-year-old boy and has lived in Seattle his entire life. He has severe cerebral palsy, a neurological disorder that affects motor control. In Shawn's case, his entire body is affected; he has absolutely no control over any of his bodily functions. Shawn's condition is a major part of the story, for it affects how everyone looks at him and their opinions on him.

In the first few chapters, Shawn McDaniel explains his condition to the reader. He includes what he feels to be positive sides of his condition, such as his perfect memory. Shawn remembers every experience, every sensation, and everything he's ever learned from school or television. Unfortunately due to his complete lack of motor control, Shawn is unable to talk or make contact with his family in any way; it is believed by those around him that Shawn's mind has no higher functional skills. A running theme throughout the book is Shawn's desire to be truly known by someone. Shawn introduces his family to the reader. His mother is his main caretaker and his father is a writer who has won a Pulitzer Prize for a poem about Shawn.

The main story is about euthanasia. Shawn feels that his father Sydney McDaniel is trying to kill him. Sydney constantly talks about euthanasia. In an interview during a Jerry Springer-style show Sydney interviews a man who killed his son with a similar condition, who reveals that he just wanted to end his son's pain. In the end, the reader is left to wonder if Sydney follows the other man's example, or allowed Shawn to continue his life. Shawn frequently expresses that he dislikes being talked down to as if he were a baby. He stresses throughout the novel that he is just as intelligent, or more intelligent, than others around him. We are also introduced to his school life in the middle of the novel.

"Either way, whatever he does, I'll be soaring."

== Reception ==
Stuck in Neutral caused some controversy at a school in Evansville, Wisconsin, where the book was required reading. Parents felt the subject matter was too sad and violent. Trueman strongly defended his book and school officials in Wisconsin eventually agreed. Stuck in Neutral remains required reading for students.

== Play ==
In 2013 Allison Cameron Gray and Matt Corpenning adapted the novel into the play Stuck in Neutral. The show ran from May 10, 2013 - June 10, 2013 at the Secret Rose Theatre in North Hollywood, CA, Directed by David P. Johnson with positive reviews. The cast included Jonathan D. Black as Shawn McDaniel, Mary Carrig as Lindy McDaniel, Tommy Cramer as Paul McDaniel, Amy Greenspan as Cindy McDaniel, Swati Kapila & Breana Tomey as Ally, Leslie Thurston as Alice Ponds, David Michael Trevino as Cyd McDaniel and John Walcutt as Earl Detruax respectively.
