= Almost Perfect (novel) =

2009 young adult novel by Brian Katcher

- Author: Brian Katcher
- Language: English
- Genre: Young adult fiction
- Publisher: Delacorte Books for Young Readers
- Publication date: October 13, 2009
- Publication place: United States
- Media type: Print (hardcover, paperback)
- Pages: 280
- ISBN: 9780385736640

Almost Perfect is a young adult novel by Brian Katcher, published October 13, 2009 by Delacorte Books for Young Readers.

The book follows Logan, a high-school senior, who, after discovering his girlfriend cheated on him, befriends the new student, Sage. Logan gradually develops romantic feelings for Sage until she informs him she's transgender. Logan must then work through complicated feelings regarding his attraction to Sage.

== Characters ==
=== Protagonists ===
- Logan Witherspoon: A highschool athlete who breaks up with his girlfriend of 3 years after finding out she cheated. He befriends a mysterious new girl in town whom he has romantic feelings for.
- Sage Hendricks: A mysterious stealth transgender new girl in town, she becomes Logan's new friend and love interest.

=== Supporting ===
- Jack Severson: Logan's annoying bestfriend who serves as a comic relief.
- Brenda: Logan's ex-girlfriend whom he dated for 3 years before breaking up after her Infidelity.
- Mrs Witherspoon: Logan's struggling single mother of two who is a waitress at a local restaurant. She had to take care of her children on her own after her husband walked out on them.
- Tim Tokugowa: The only Asian student in Boyer and a friend of Logan's, He is very wise yet sloppy, messy and loves eating snacks. He has certain obligations to destroy Asian stereotypes.
- Laura Witherspoon: Logan's big sister who moved out after getting a scholarship to the University of Missouri.
- Tammi Hendricks: 15 year old freshman who is Sage's younger sister.
- Tanya: A pretty girl who is in the cheerleading squad.

== Reception ==
=== Reviews ===
Almost Perfect received starred reviews from Kirkus, as well as a positive review from Booklist.

Kirkus Reviews applauded the book for tackling "issues of homophobia, hate crimes and stereotyping with humor and grace in an accessible tone that will resonate with teens." Booklist echoed the sentiment, stating, "Teens—both those familiar with transgender issues and those who are not—will welcome the honest take on a rarely explored subject."

=== Accolades ===
Accolades for Almost Perfect
| Year | Accolade | Result | Ref. |
|---|---|---|---|
| 2010 | American Library Association Best Books for Young Adults | Selection | |
| 2010 | American Library Association's Rainbow Project Book List | Selection | |
| 2011 | James Cook Book Award | Honor | |
| 2011 | Stonewall Book Award | Winner | |
| 2012 | YALSA's Popular Paperbacks for Young Adults | Selection | |
| 2013 | American Library Association's Amazing Audiobooks for Young Adults | Selection | |

=== Censorship ===
In a report conducted by the American Library Association’s Office for Intellectual Freedom, Almost Perfect was named the 81st-most banned and challenged book in the United States between 2010 and 2019.

| When | Where | Outcome | Notes | References |
|---|---|---|---|---|
| 2023 | Forest Hills Public School, Michigan | Removed | Banned alongside 9 other books by superintendent, challenged by National Coalition Against Censorship, superintendent offered an apology and retired. As of April 2023, some books have been added back, but some are still removed | |
| 2022 | Alpine School District, Utah | Removed | Banned alongside 52 other books, after Utah law H.B. 374, banned books containing “Sensitive Materials In Schools," 42% of books removed featured LBGTQ+ characters and or themes, and were removed because they were considered to contain pornographic material according to the new law, which defines porn using the following criteria: "The average person" would find that the material, on the whole, "appeals to prurient interest in sex"; The material "is patently offensive in the description or depiction of nudity, sexual conduct, sexual excitement, sadomasochistic abuse, or excretion"; The material, on the whole, "does not have serious literary, artistic, political or scientific value." | |
| 2022 | Polk County Public Schools, Florida | Retained | Removed initially along with 15 other books, National Coalition Against Censorship brought it to the attention of the school district, and after being reviewed by two committees and the district, all 16 books were returned, but as of May 2022, they were 'quarantined' and not accessible to students | |
