= Clyde Robert Bulla =

American writer (1914–2007)

Clyde Robert Bulla (January 9, 1914 - May 23, 2007) was an American writer who wrote over fifty books for children. He received his early education in a one-room schoolhouse where he began writing stories and songs. He finished his first book shortly after his graduation from high school and then went to work on a newspaper as a columnist and a typesetter. His first book, The Donkey Cart, was published in 1946. His autobiography, A Grain of Wheat: A Writer Begins, was published in 1985. The book referred to an essay he wrote in 1924 for the St. Joseph Gazette in which he tied with 100 others for third-place to write about a grain of wheat.

The manuscripts for many of his historical novels are in University of Oregon Libraries, Special Collections and University Archives. There are also materials held at the James C. Kirkpatrick Library at the University of Central Missouri, whose Children's Literature Festival welcomed him as a presenter twenty-two times. These materials include his grand piano which is located on the first floor of the library, original illustrations from the illustrators of several of his books, including works from Don Freeman and Lois Lenski, and personal correspondence.

== Awards and recognitions ==
In 1962, Mr. Bulla received the first award of the Southern California Council on Children's Literature. He was the first recipient of the Southern California Council on Children's Literature award for distinguished contribution to the field.

== Selected publications ==
- Riding the Pony Express (1948)
- The Secret Valley (1949)
- Eagle Feather (1953)
- Star of Wild Horse Canyon, Scholastic Book Services (1953)
- Squanto, Friend of the White Men (1954) (later retitled Squanto, Friend of the Pilgrims)
- The Poppy Seeds (1955)
- The Sword in the Tree (1956)
- Ghost Town Treasure, Scholastic Book Services (1957)
- Pirate's Promise (1958)
- The Valentine Cat (1959)
- A Tree Is A Plant (1960)
- Benito (1961)
- Viking Adventure (1963)
- White Bird (1966)
- The Ghost of Windy Hill (1968)
- The Moon Singer (1969)
- Pocahontas and the Strangers (1971)
- Shoeshine Girl (1975)
- Marco Moonlight (1976)
- The Beast of Lor (1977)
- A Lion to Guard Us (1981) ISBN 0-690-04096-2
- The Chalk Box Kid (1987)
- "The Christmas Coat" (1989)
- A Place for Angels (1995)
- The Paint Brush Kid (1999)
- Daniel's Duck
- Charlie's House
