= Cena Christopher Draper =

American author from Missouri

Cena Christopher Draper (born October 17, 1907, in Warrensburg, Missouri, United States, d. October 8, 1986, Stuart, Florida) was an American writer and playwright who wrote novels and numerous plays for children. Her writing mirrored her childhood growing up in the 1920s in Warrensburg, Missouri, the fourth generation to do so in Warrensburg. Her grandfather, J. H. Christopher, owned and developed a resort known as Pertle Springs, inspiration for the setting of some of her novels.

There are materials of Draper's held at the James C. Kirkpatrick Library at the University of Central Missouri, including manuscripts and correspondence.

== Education ==
Draper attended Central Missouri State College (now the University of Central Missouri) for two years before continuing at the University of Missouri from which she graduated in 1931 with a Bachelor of Arts. She was a member of Kappa Kappa Gamma.

== Awards and recognitions ==
Draper wrote four prize-winning plays produced by the Kansas City's Community Children's Theatre: Zig Zag Zip A Roo (1955), Wizards of Taboo (1957), The Golden Hoop (1959) and Bells of Melodoon (1962). She also wrote From the Singing Hills, which received first place in a nationwide competition and was produced by the Junior League of Kansas City.

In 1966 Rim of the Ridge was chosen by Books-Across-The Sea and was on the Children's Book Council of New York's list and also received the Missouri Press Award. In 1968, Draper was selected as one of the hundred distinguished alumnae of the University of Missouri at an event to celebrate the hundredth anniversary of the admission of women to the university. In 1969 she was one of authors at the inaugural Children's Literature Festival at the University of Central Missouri, receiving the Central Missouri State University Certificate of Recognition for Contributions to Children's Literature from the college's president at the time, Warren C. Lovinger. She also presented at the festival in 1971, 1974 and 1979. In 1975, Dandy and the Mystery of the Locked Room was chosen for Books-Across-the-Sea.

== Selected publications ==
- "The Grand Old Man" included in The Yearbook of Short Plays, 1st Series, Row, Peterson (1931)
- Plays of Fancy: Six Short Plays for Elementary School, Row, Peterson (1948)
- Deep in the Dingle Dell, Row, Peterson (1951)
- Children's Plays from Favorite Stories, Plays Publications (1960)
- Ridge Willoughby, Steck (1952)
- Papa Says, Liveright (1956) (for adults)
- Mother the Overseer (privately published) (1962)
- Rim of the Ridge, Criterion (1965)
- Dandy and the Mystery of the Locked Room, Independence Press (1974)
- The Worst Hound Around, The Westminster Press (1979)
