= Good-bye, Billy Radish =

1992 book by Gloria Skurzynski

- First edition
- Author: Gloria Skurzynski
- Language: English
- Genre: Historical fiction
- Publisher: Simon & Schuster
- Publication date: 1992
- Publication place: United States
- Media type: Print (hardback)
- Pages: 198
- ISBN: 0-02-782921-9
- OCLC: 35909001

Good-bye, Billy Radish is a prize-winning, historical, young-adult novel by the American writer Gloria Skurzynski.

It is set in 1917 in the fictional mill town of Canaan (a parallel to the author's hometown of Duquesne, Pennsylvania, just south of Pittsburgh on the Monongahela River). The book tells the story of two working-class boys, Hank Kerner, who considers himself all-American, and his best friend Bazyli Radichevych, a Ukrainian immigrant whom Hank nicknames Billy Radish. Both are scheduled to enter the steel mill when they turn 14. As they exit childhood, they must cope with the challenges of industrial life as America enters World War I.

In 1992 the novel was selected one of the year's "Best Books" by the School Library Journal.
