= Claudia Mills =

American author and academic (born 1954)

- Born: August 21, 1954 (age 71); New York City, United States
- Spouse: Richard W. Wahl (m. 1985)
- Children: 2

Academic background
- Education: Wellesley College (BA, 1976); Princeton University (MA, 1979; Ph.D., 1991); University of Maryland (MLS, 1988)
- Thesis: Influence: Coercion, manipulation, and persuasion (1991)
- Doctoral advisor: Thomas M. Scanlon

Claudia Jane Mills (born August 21, 1954, in New York City) is an American author of children's books. She is also an associate professor of philosophy at the University of Colorado Boulder.

== Early life and education ==
Mills was born in New York City on August 21, 1954, to Charles Howard and Helen Mills (née Lederleitner). She married Richard W. Wahl on October 19, 1985. She has two children, Christopher Richard Wahl and Gregory Charles Wahl.

Mills received a Bachelor of Arts from Wellesley College in 1976, a Master of Arts from Princeton University in 1979, and a Master of Library and Information Science from the University of Maryland in 1988. She then returned to Princeton University to receive a Doctor of Philosophy in 1991.

== Awards and honors ==
In 2016, The Bulletin of the Center for Children's Books named Franklin School Friends a "Notable series." They namedThe Lost Language one of the best books of 2021.

Awards and honors for Mills's writing
Year	Title	Award/Honor	Ref.
2002	Gus and Grandpa at Basketball	ALSC Notable Children's Books	
2003	7 X 9 = Trouble!	ALSC Notable Children's Books	
2010	How Oliver Olson Changed the World	ALSC Notable Children's Books	

== Publications ==
=== After-School Superstars Series ===
- Nixie Ness, Cooking Star, Holiday House, 2019
- Vera Vance, Comics Star, Holiday House, 2020
- Lucy Lopez, Coding Star, Holiday House, 2020
- Boogie Bass, Sign Language Star, Holiday House, 2021

=== The Nora Notebooks Series ===
- The Nora Notebooks: The Trouble With Ants, Alfred A. Knopf Books for Young Readers, 2015
- The Nora Notebooks: The Trouble With Babies, Alfred A. Knopf Books for Young Readers, 2016
- The Nora Notebooks: The Trouble With Friends, Alfred A. Knopf Books for Young Readers, 2017

=== Franklin School Friends Series ===
- Kelsey Green, Reading Queen, Farrar, Straus and Giroux, 2012
- Annika Riz, Math Whiz, Farrar, Straus and Giroux, 2014
- Izzy Barr, Running Star, Farrar, Straus and Giroux, 2015
- Simon Ellis, Spelling Bee Champ, Farrar, Straus and Giroux, 2015
- Cody Harmon, King of Pets, Farrar, Straus and Giroux, 2016

=== Mason Dixon Series ===
- Mason Dixon: Pet Disasters, Alfred A. Knopf Books for Young Readers, 2011
- Mason Dixon: 4th Grade Disasters, Alfred A. Knopf Books for Young Readers, 2011
- Mason Dixon: Basketball Disasters, Alfred A. Knopf Books for Young Readers, 2012

=== Gus and Grandpa Series ===
- Gus and Grandpa, Farrar, Straus and Giroux, 1997
- Gus and Grandpa and the Christmas Cookies, Farrar, Straus and Giroux, 1997
- Gus and Grandpa Ride the Train, Farrar, Straus and Giroux, 1998
- Gus and Grandpa at the Hospital, Farrar, Straus and Giroux, 1998
- Gus and Grandpa and the Two-Wheeled Bike, Farrar, Straus and Giroux, 1999
- Gus and Grandpa and Show-and-Tell, Farrar, Straus and Giroux, 2000
- Gus and Grandpa at Basketball, Farrar, Straus and Giroux, 2001
- Gus and Grandpa and the Halloween Costume, Farrar, Straus and Giroux, 2002
- Gus and Grandpa Go Fishing, Farrar, Straus and Giroux, 2003
- Gus and Grandpa and the Piano Lesson, Farrar, Straus and Giroux, 2004

=== West Creek Middle School Series ===
- Losers, Inc., Farrar, Straus and Giroux, 1997
- You're a Brave Man, Julius Zimmerman, Farrar, Straus and Giroux, 1999
- Lizzie at Last, Farrar, Straus and Giroux, 2000
- Alex Ryan, Stop That!, Farrar, Straus and Giroux, 2003
- Makeovers by Marcia, Farrar, Straus and Giroux, 2005

=== Dinah Series ===
- Dynamite Dinah, Macmillan, 1990
- Dinah for President, Macmillan, 1992
- Dinah in Love, Macmillan, 1993
- Dinah Forever, Farrar, Straus and Giroux, 1995

=== Other ===
- Luisa's American Dream, Four Winds, 1981
- At the Back of the Woods, Four Winds, 1982
- The Secret Carousel, Four Winds, 1983
- All The Living, Macmillan, 1983
- What about Annie?, Walker, 1985
- Boardwalk with Hotel, Macmillan, 1985
- The One and Only Cynthia Jane Thornton, Macmillan, 1986
- Melanie Magpie, Bantam, 1987
- Cally's Enterprise, Macmillan, 1988
- After Fifth Grade, the World!, Macmillan, 1989
- Hannah on Her Way, Macmillan, 1991
- A Visit to Amy-Claire, Macmillan, 1992
- Phoebe's Parade, Macmillan, 1994
- The Secret Life of Bethany Barrett, Macmillan, 1994
- One Small Lost Sheep, Farrar, Straus and Giroux, 1997
- Standing Up to Mr. O., Farrar, Straus and Giroux, 1998
- 7 x 9 = Trouble!, Farrar, Straus and Giroux, 2002
- Perfectly Chelsea, Farrar, Straus and Giroux, 2004
- Ziggy's Blue-Ribbon Day, Farrar, Straus and Giroux, 2005
- Trading Places, Farrar, Straus and Giroux, 2006
- Being Teddy Roosevelt, Farrar, Straus and Giroux, 2007
- The Totally Made-up Civil War Diary of Amanda MacLeish, Farrar, Straus and Giroux, 2008
- How Oliver Olson Changed the World, Farrar, Straus and Giroux, 2009
- One Square Inch, Farrar, Straus and Giroux, 2010
- Fractions=Trouble!, Farrar, Straus and Giroux, 2011
- Zero Tolerance, Farrar, Straus and Giroux, 2013
- Write This Down, Farrar, Straus and Giroux, 2016
- The Lost Language, Holiday House, 2021
