= Hillary Homzie =

- Born: Virginia, United States.
- Education: University of Virginia
- Occupations: Lecturer, writer
- Website: HillaryHomzie.com

Hillary Homzie is a lecturer, playwright and author from Charlottesville, Virginia.

== Early life ==
Homzie was born Denver and raised in Virginia, United States of America. She is the daughter of the late M.J. Homzie.

A rather shy child, Homzie moved to England at the age of six years old, where she felt she 'had been transported into one of the Brothers Grimm stories' and began playing pretend with her best friend, creating imaginary fairy worlds in the garden. This act of pretending transformed into a love of performing during high school and university.

Homzie received a master's degree in education from Temple University and a master's degree from Hollins University in children's literature and writing.

== Career ==
Following her graduation from the University of Virginia, Homzie moved to New York City and began writing and performing sketch comedy in the comedy clubs of Soho, Greenwich Village, and Boston.

Homzie didn't start writing novels until the age of twenty-three after studying a children's writing course at City University, New York. It was during this class that she "found the voice that came out of a 13-year old" on the verge of becoming a teenager".

Homzie is now the author of the comedic chapter book series, Alien Clones From Outer Space, as well as middle grade novels such as Things Are Going To Get Ugly (2009) and the Hot List (2011). Alien Clones from Outer Space has also now been adapted as an animated TV series in Australia.

In recent years, she has worked as Lecturer of Communication and Media Studies at the Sonoma State University and teaches at Hollins University Graduate Program in Children's Literature.

== Personal life ==
Homzie resides in Napa, California with her family.

== Bibliography ==
- Alien Clones From Outer Space - Chapter Book Series.
  - Two Heads Are Better Than One (2002).
  - Who Let the Dogs Out? (2002).
  - The Babysitters Wore Diapers (2003).
  - Food Fight (2003).
- Things Are Going To Get Ugly (2009)
- The Hot List (2011).
- Queen of Likes (2016).
