= Michael Spradlin =

American novelist (died 2026)

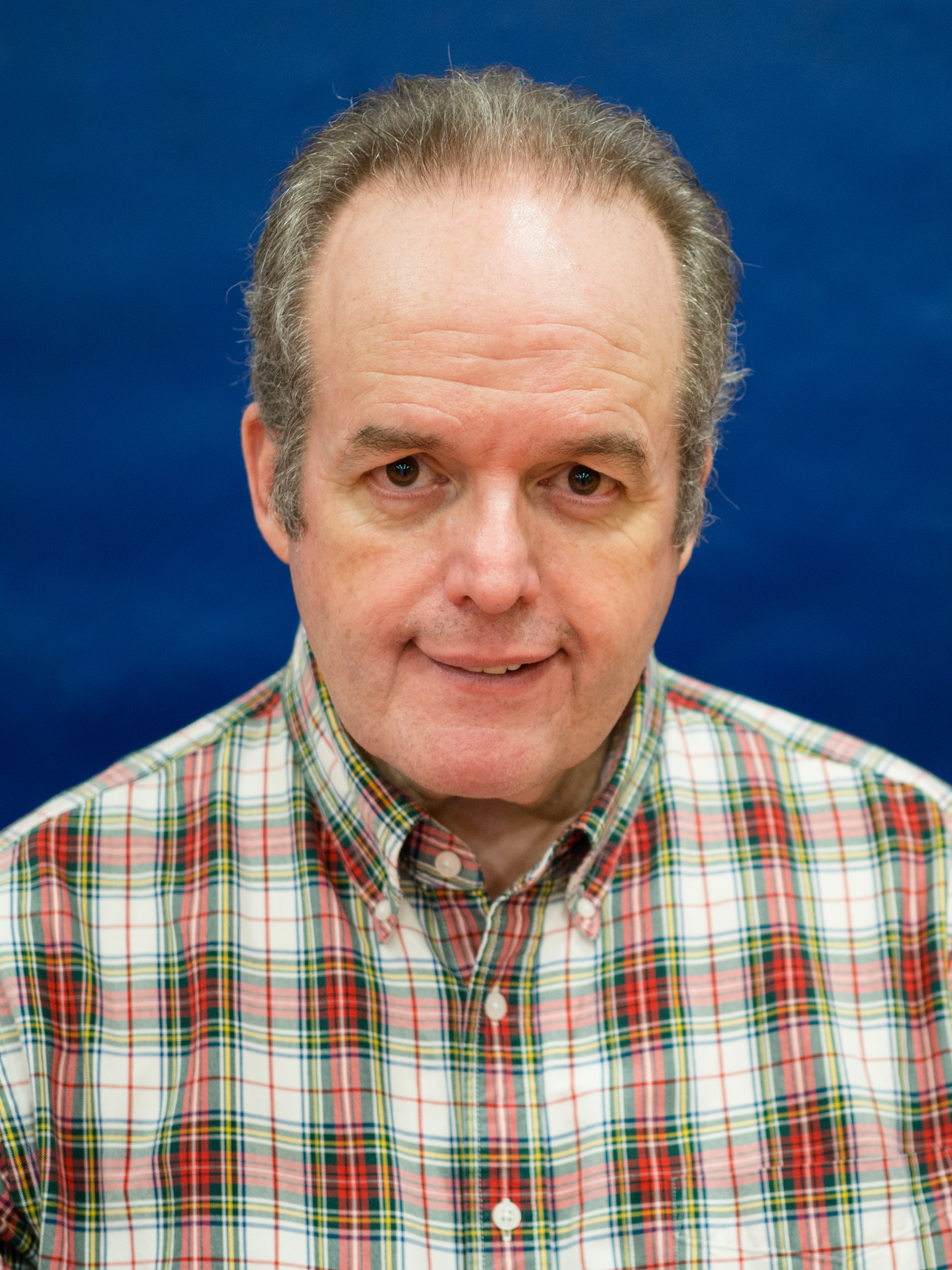
- Michael Spradlin - 2016
- Born: Homer, Michigan, USA
- Died: April 12, 2026 Lapeer, Michigan, USA
- Language: English
- Notable awards: Western Heritage Award for Best Juvenile Book; 2011 Off Like the Wind

Website
- www.michaelspradlin.com

Michael P. Spradlin (died 2026) was an American author. He wrote standalone books and series for children, middle grade, young adult, and adult readers, including fiction and non-fiction.

Two of Spradlin's books are Junior Library Guild selections: Into the Killing Seas (2015) and Leo Thorsness: Vietnam: Valor in the Sky (2019). In 2006, Live & Let Shop was nominated for the Edgar Award for Best Young Adult Novel. In 2011, Off Like the Wind won the Western Heritage Award for Best Juvenile Book.

In addition to writing, Spradlin worked as a bookseller and sales executive, including working for Avon Books and William Morrow and Company from 1989 to 1999, then for HarperCollins from 1999 to 2011.

Spradlin grew up in Homer, Michigan, then studied history at Central Michigan University. He died in Lapeer, Michigan on April 12, 2026.

== Publications ==
=== Children's books ===
==== Young readers ====
- The Legend of Blue Jacket. Illustrated by Ronald Himler. HarperCollins. 2002. ISBN 978-0688158354.
- Daniel Boone's Great Escape. Illustrated by Ard Hoyt. Walker & Co. 2008. ISBN 978-0-8027-9581-6.
- Texas Rangers: Legendary Lawmen. Illustrated by Roxie Munro. Walker & Co. 2008. ISBN 978-0-8027-8096-6.
- Baseball from A to Z. Illustrated by Macky Pamintuan. HarperCollinsPublishers. 2010. ISBN 978-0-06-124081-2.
- Off Like the Wind!: The First Ride of the Pony Express. Illustrated by Layne Johnson. Walker. 2010. ISBN 978-0-8027-9652-3.
- The Monster Alphabet. Illustrated by Jeff Weigel. Price Stern Sloan. 2012. ISBN 978-0-8431-6984-3.

==== Middle grade ====
===== Killer Species series =====
- Menace From the Deep. Scholastic. 2013. ISBN 978-0545580700.
- Feeding Frenzy. Scholastic. 2013. ISBN 978-0545576680.
- Out for Blood. Scholastic. 2014. ISBN 978-0545633826.
- Ultimate Attack. Scholastic. 2014. ISBN 978-0545662871.

===== Medal of Honor series =====
- Jack Montgomery: World War II: Gallantry at Anzio. Farrar, Straus Giroux. 2019. ISBN 978-1-250-15706-5.
- Ryan Pitts: Afghanistan: A Firefight in the Mountains of Wanat. New York: Farrar Straus Giroux. 2019. ISBN 978-1-250-15711-9.
- Leo Thorsness: Vietnam: Valor in the Sky. Farrar, Straus Giroux. 2019. ISBN 978-1250157133.

===== Web of the Spider series =====
- Rise of the Spider. New York: Margaret K. McElderry Books. 2024. ISBN 978-1-6659-4720-6.
- Threat of the Spider. Margaret K. McElderry Books. 2025. ISBN 978-1-665-94723-7.
- The Spider Strikes. Margaret K. McElderry Books. 2026. ISBN 978-1665947268.

===== World War II Adventure series =====
- Prisoner of War. HarperCollins. 2017. ISBN 978-0-545-85783-3.
- Into the Killing Seas. HarperCollins. 2015. ISBN 978-0-545-72602-3.
- The Enemy Above. HarperCollins. 2016. ISBN 978-0545857826.

===== Youngest Templar series =====
- Keeper of the Grail. Narrated by Paul Boehmer. Puffin Books. 2008. ISBN 978-1101158647.
- Trail of Fate. Puffin Books. 2009. ISBN 978-1101494875.
- Orphan of Destiny. Puffin Books. 2010. ISBN 978-1101198353.

===== Standalone books =====
- Pandora Gets Vain. Bloomsbury. 2008. ISBN 978-1-59990-197-8.
- Pararescue Corps. Capstone Press. 2019. ISBN 978-1-4965-8105-1.
- Close Calls: How Eleven U.S. Presidents Escaped from the Brink of Death. Bloomsbury Children's Books. 2020. ISBN 978-1-5476-0023-6.
- The Raven's Shadow. Crossroad Press. 2025. ISBN 978-1637893296.

==== Young adult books ====
===== I, Q series =====
- The Alamo. Co-written with Roland Smith. Sleeping Bear Press. 2014. ISBN 978-1627537216.
- Windy City. Co-written with Roland Smith. Sleeping Bear Press. 2014. ISBN 978-1627539180.
- Alcatraz. Co-written with Roland Smith. Sleeping Bear Press. 2014. ISBN 978-1627539098.

===== Spy Goddess series =====
- Live and Let Shop. HarperCollins. 2005. ISBN 0-06-059407-1.
- To Hawaii, with Love. HarperCollins. 2006. ISBN 978-1480457942.
- The Spy Who Totally Had a Crush on Me. Open Road Media. 2014. ISBN 978-1480457959.

===== Spy Goddess Manga series =====
- Chase for the Chalice. Illustrated by Rainbow Buddy. Tokyopop. 2008. ISBN 978-0061362996.
- The Quest for the Lance. Illustrated by Rainbow Buddy. HarperCollins. 2009. ISBN 978-0061363009.
- The Search for the Scepter. Illustrated by Rainbow Buddy. HarperCollins. 2009. ISBN 978-0061363016.

=== Adult books ===
- It’s Beginning to Look a Lot Like Zombies: A Book of Zombie Christmas Carols. Introduction by Christopher Moore and illustrated by Jeff Weigel. William Morrow. 2009. ISBN 978-0061986024.
- Jack and Jill Went Up to Kill: A Book of Zombie Love Songs. Illustrated by Jeff Weigel. William Morrow. 2010. ISBN 978-0062063281.
- Pirate Haiku: Bilge-Sucking Poems of Booty, Grog, and Wenches for Scurvy Sea Dogs. Adams Media. 2010. ISBN 978-1440509834.
- Jack and Jill Went Up to Kill: A Book of Zombie Nursery Rhymes. Illustrated by Jeff Weigel. William Morrow. 2011. ISBN 978-0062083609.
- Blood Riders. Crossroad Press. 2012. ISBN 978-0-06-202309-4.
