= Sneed B. Collard III =

American author (born 1959)

Sneed Body Collard III
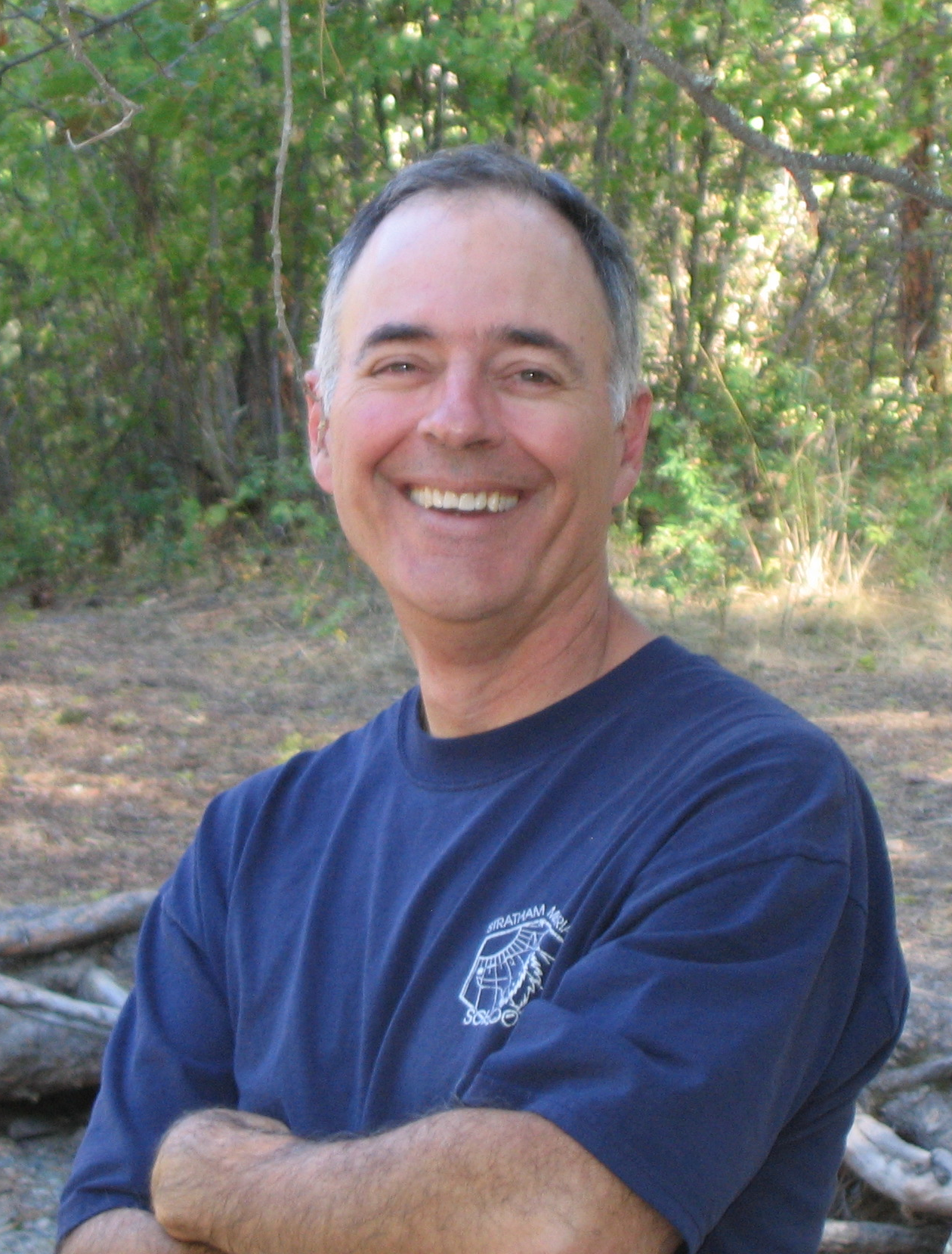
- Born: November 7, 1959 (age 66) Santa Barbara, California. U.S.
- Occupation: Biologist; computer scientist; author
- Genre: Science; fiction; children's books

Website
- www.sneedbcollardiii.com

Sneed Body Collard III (born 1959) is an American author.

On November 4, 2006, Collard received the Washington Post/Children's Book Guild Award, presented annually to "an author or illustrator whose total body of work has contributed significantly to the quality of nonfiction for children." In 2006, Collard also received the American Association for the Advancement of Science (AAAS) award for his science book The Prairie Builders: Reconstructing America's Lost Grasslands. Collard has written almost 100 books for young people, including Shep—Our Most Loyal Dog, Fire Birds: Valuing Natural Wildfires and Burned Forests, Hopping Ahead of Climate Change: Snowshoe Hares, Science, and Survival, and Dog Sense. His picture book Border Crossings won the prestigious 2024 Orbis Pictus award from the National Council of Teachers of English.

He is also the author of an adult memoir, Warblers & Woodpeckers: A Father-Son Big Year of Birding (2018, Mountaineers Books), a professional development textbook, Teaching Nonfiction Revision: A Professional Writer Shares Strategies, Tips, and Lessons (Heinemann, 2017), the travel guidebook First-Time Japan, and the humorous birding guide Birding for Boomers, which won several awards and made the PNBA regional bestseller list.

He is a regular contributor to Montana Outdoors, Bird Watcher's Digest (BWD), and other magazines for adults. His articles also have appeared in Environmental Action, The Humanist, Florida Wildlife, Islands, Cricket, and Highlights for Children.

== Biography ==
Collard has been a biologist, computer scientist, speaker, and author.

The son of biologists, Collard says that he fell in love with the animals at an early age, watching whales with his mother and searching for snakes, turtles, and alligators with his father.

Collard began writing after graduating with honors in marine science from the University of California, Berkeley. He earned a master's in scientific instrumentation at the University of California, Santa Barbara, after which he worked as a computer consultant for biologists.

As of 2026, Collard lives in Montana where he continues to write books and articles for both young people and adults.

== Children's nonfiction books ==
Selected science books:

- 1994 Green Giants
- 1994 Smart Survivors
- 1994 Tough Terminators
- 1996 Alien Invaders—The Continuing Threat of Exotic Species
- 1996 Our Natural Homes: Exploring Terrestrial Biomes of North and South America (Our Perfect Planet)
- 1997 Animal Dads
- 1997 Creepy Creatures (Formerly titled Do They Scare You? Creepy Creatures)
- 1997 Monteverde (Venture Books—Science)
- 1998 Animal Dazzlers
- 1998 Our Wet World: Exploring Earth's Aquatic Ecosystems
- 1999 1,000 Years Ago on Planet Earth
- 2000 Acting for Nature
- 2000 Animal Dads
- 2000 Birds of Prey: A Look at Daytime Raptors (Watts Library)
- 2000 Making Animal Babies
- 2000 The Forest in the Clouds
- 2002 Beaks!
- 2002 Leaving Home
- 2003 B is for Big Sky Country: A Montana Alphabet (Discover America State by State)
- 2004 Animals Asleep
- 2005 A Platypus, Probably
- 2005 One Night in the Coral Sea
- 2005 The Prairie Builders: Reconstructing America's Lost Grasslands (Scientists in the Field Series)
- 2006 On the Coral Reefs (Science Adventures)
- 2006 In the Deep Sea (Science Adventures)
- 2006 In the Wild (Science Adventures)
- 2006 In the Rain Forest (Science Adventures)
- 2006 Shep: Our Most Loyal Dog (True Story)
- 2007 Pocket Babies: And Other Amazing Marsupials (Junior Library Guild Selection)
- 2008 Science Warriors: The Battle Against Invasive Species (Scientists in the Field Series)
- 2009 Many Biomes, One Earth (rereleased version of Our Natural Homes)
- 2010 The World Famous Miles City Bucking Horse Sale
- 2011 Acting for Nature: What Young People Around The World Have Done To Protect The Environment
- 2012 Global Warming—A Personal Guide to Causes and Solutions
- 2012 Sneed B. Collard III's Most Fun Book Ever About Lizards
- 2014 A Listen to Patriotic Music
- 2014 A Look at Cubism
- 2014 Drones and War Machines
- 2014 The CIA and FBI: Top Secret
- 2014 U.S. Air Force: Absolute Power
- 2015 Fire Birds: Valuing Natural Wildfires and Burned Forests
- 2016 Hopping Ahead of Climate Change: Snowshoe Hares, Science, and Survival
- 2017 Catching Air: Taking the Leap with Gliding Animals
- 2018 Woodpeckers: Drilling Holes & Bagging Bugs
- 2018 One Iguana, Two Iguanas: A Story of Accident, Natural Selection, and Evolution
- 2019 Birds of Every Color
- 2022 Little Killers: The Ferocious Lives of Puny Predators
- 2023 Border Crossings
- 2024 Defending Nature: How the U.S. Military Protects Threatened and Endangered Species
- 2024 Like No Other: Earth's Coolest One-of-a-Kind Creatures

== Children's and young adult fiction ==
- 2005 Dog Sense
- 2006 Flash Point
- 2009 Double Eagle
- 2011 The Governor's Dog is Missing (Slate Stephens Mysteries)
- 2011 Hangman's Gold (Slate Stephens Mysteries)
- 2012 Cartwheel: A Sequel to Double Eagle
- 2014 Dog 4491
- 2021 Beaver and Otter Get Along . . . Sort of
- 2021 Waiting for a Warbler
- 2023 Border Crossings

== Adult nonfiction ==
- 2017 Teaching Nonfiction Revision: A Professional Writer Shares Strategies, Tips, and Lessons
- 2018 Warblers and Woodpeckers: A Father-Son Big Year of Birding
- 2024 First-Time Japan: A Step-by-Step Guide for the Independent Traveler
- 2024 Birding for Boomers—And Everyone Else Brave Enough to Embrace the World's Most Rewarding and Frustrating Activity
- 2027 Birding the Great Wide Open

== Selected awards ==
- 1995 Lud Browman Award for body of work, given by the University of Montana Friends of the Mansfield Library
- 1997, 1998 Society of Children's Book Writers and Illustrators Magazine Merit Award
- 2005 ASPCA Henry Bergh Award for Dog Sense
- 2005 ASPCA Henry Bergh Award for The Prairie Builders
- 2006 Washington Post-Children's Book Guild Nonfiction Award Winner: Sneed B. Collard III
- 2006 AAAS Prize for Excellence in Science Books for The Prairie Builders
- 2006 ASPCA Henry Bergh Award for Flash Point
- 2007 Green Earth Book Award for Flash Point
- 2008 Treasure State Award for Shep—Our Most Loyal Dog
- 2009 Green Earth Book Award for Science Warriors (Honor Book)
- 2009 Children's Gallery Award for Shep—Our Most Loyal Dog
- 2011 High Plains Book Award (Finalist) for The World Famous Miles City Bucking Horse Sale (Finalist)
- 2011 Green Earth Book Award for Global Warming (Honor Book)
- 2014 Green Earth Book Award finalist for Dog 4491
- 2016 Green Prize for Fire Birds: Valuing Natural Wildfires and Burned Forests
- 2016 Eureka! Book Award for Excellence in Nonfiction for Young Readers for Fire Birds: Valuing Natural Wildfires and Burned Forests
- 2017 Eureka! Book Award for Excellence in Nonfiction for Young Readers for Hopping Ahead of Climate Change
- 2017 High Plains Book Award for Hopping Ahead of Climate Change
- 2017 AAAS/Subaru/SB&F Prize for Excellence in Science Books (Finalist) for Hopping Ahead of Climate Change
- 2018 Montana Book Award (Honor Book) for Warblers and Woodpeckers: A Father-Son Big Year of Birding
- 2019 High Plains Book Award (Finalist) for Warblers and Woodpeckers: A Father-Son Big Year of Birding
