= Hadley Irwin =

Pseudonym for two American writers of young adult literature

Hadley Irwin was the pseudonym of a writing team of young adult literature, consisting of Lee Hadley (10 October 1934 in Earlham, Iowa – 22 August 1995) and Annabelle Irwin (8 October 1915 in Peterson, Iowa – 13 September 1998), both Iowa State University English professors. The pair started writing together in 1979. Their 1985 book Abby, My Love is considered to be the first in children's literature to deal with incest/child sexual abuse.

== Themes ==
Hadley Irwin wrote so called 'problem novels' about teenagers, aimed at young adults, for example about alcoholism, racism, antisemitism, incest/child sexual abuse and suicide. Aside from this primary theme, Irwin often portrays the elderly as human beings with their own hopes, fears, and problems. Books are often set in Iowa, the home state of both Hadley and Irwin. A final theme has to do with the relationships between parents and children.

According to The New York Times, the novel Abby, My Love (1985) was the first novel in children's literature to deal with incest/child sexual abuse. The main character of the book is a girl who is sexually abused by her father.

In spite of the heavy subjects, the books are written with humor, and the main theme is coming of age, and relations between people. Their historic novels are based on facts.

The book We Are Mesquakie We Are One describes the history of the Meskwaki accurately, according to expert Adeline Wanatee.

== Reception ==
According to The New York Times Book Review, The Lilith Summer is "a sympathetic novel of teen-age distress", "in no way a liberationist tract" and "The story is warm and the writing exemplary".

According to Publishers Weekly, Hadley Irwin's "themes are thoughtfully developed and well worth pondering", and Kim/Kimi is "a drama that Irwin spices with naturally amusing episodes".

Some of Hadley Irwin's books have been adapted for the screen. Their books sold steadily in the United States as well as in Europe and in Japan. Abby, My Love (also Atheneum), which focuses on incest, was adapted as a CBS Schoolbreak Special in 1988.

== Awards ==
Hadley Irwin received several literary awards for their books:

- In 1981: an honor book designation from the Jane Addams Peace Association for We Are Mesquakie, We Are One (1980).
- In 1982: Society of Midland Authors award for Moon and Me (1981)
- In 1982: ALA Best Young Adult Book Award for What About Grandma? (1982).
- In 1982: the Dutch Book Award Zilveren griffel for We Are Mesquakie, We Are One (1980).
- In 1983: the Dutch Book Award Vlag en Wimpel for What About Grandma? (1982).
- In 1985: ALA Best Young Adult Book Award for Abby, My Love (1985)
- In 1986: the Dutch Book Award Vlag en Wimpel for I Be Somebody (1984).
- In 1986: Children's Choice Book award from a joint committee of Children's Book Council and International Reading Association for Abby, My Love (1985)
- In 1988: the Sequoyah Intermediate Book Award for Abby, My Love (1985).

== Bibliography ==
| Year | Title | Publisher | ISBN | Notes |
|---|---|---|---|---|
| 1979 | The Lilith Summer | Old Westbury, NY: Feminist Press | ISBN 9780912670522 | Translated into Dutch as Een zomer met Lilith. Adapted into a short film in 1984. |
| 1980 | We Are Mesquakie, We Are One | Old Westbury, NY: Feminist Press | ISBN 9781558611481 | Translated into Dutch as Hidden Doe : wij zijn Mesquakie, wij zijn één. Received the Dutch Book Award Zilveren Griffel in 1992. |
| 1981 | Moon and Me | Atheneum/Margaret K. McElderry Books | ISBN 0451147588 | Translated into Dutch as Maan en ik: verhaal van een vriendschap. |
| 1981 | Bring to a Boil and Separate | Atheneum/Margaret K. McElderry Books | ISBN 0689501560 | Translated into Dutch as Katie: haar dochter – zijn dochter. |
| 1982 | What About Grandma? | Atheneum/Margaret K. McElderry Books | ISBN 0380711389 | Translated into Dutch as Twtti Rhys Hec: een meisje van zestien. Received the Dutch Book Award Vlag en Wimpel in 1983. |
| 1984 | I Be Somebody | Atheneum/Margaret K. McElderry Books | ISBN 0451153030 | Translated into Dutch as Athabasca. Received the Dutch Book Award Vlag en Wimpel in 1986. |
| 1985 | Abby, My Love | Atheneum/Margaret K. McElderry Books | ISBN 0689503237 | Translated into Dutch as Abby. Received the Sequoyah Intermediate Book Award in 1988. |
| 1987 | Kim/Kimi | Atheneum/Margaret K. McElderry Books | ISBN 014032593X | Translated into Dutch as Kimiko. |
| 1988 (March) | Writing Young Adult Novels | Writers Digest Books | ISBN 0898793130 | |
| 1988 (30 Nov.) | So long at the fair | Margaret K. McElderry | ISBN 0689504543 | Translated into Dutch as Terug naar de kermis. |
| 1990 (1 Oct) | Can't hear you listening | Margaret K. McElderry | ISBN 0689505132 | Translated into Dutch as Gewoon niet doen!. |
| 1996 (Jan.) | Jim-Dandy | Troll Communications | ISBN 081673867X | Translated into Dutch as Jim-Dandy. |
| 1996 (1 June) | The original Freddie Ackerman | Simon Pulse | ISBN 0689803893 | Translated into Dutch as Afzender: Freddie. |
| 1996 (1 Oct.) | Sarah with an H | Margaret K. McElderry | ISBN 0689809492 | |
