= Lois Ruby =

American novelist

- Occupation: Author Librarian
- Years active: 1977–present
- Known for: Steal Away Home The Secret of Laurel Oaks

Lois Ruby is the author of several children's and young adult books, including some historical fiction. Her most notable works are the historical fiction novels Steal Away Home and The Secret of Laurel Oaks.

== Personal life ==
Ruby is a former resident of Wichita, Kansas, just two hours south of Lawrence, Kansas, the setting of her novel Steal Away Home. Ruby has also lived in Albuquerque, New Mexico. She now lives in Cincinnati, Ohio with her husband. She has three adult sons and seven grandchildren.

== Works ==
- Arriving at a Place You've Never Left (1977)
- What Do You Do In Quicksand? (1981)
- Two Truths in My Pocket (1983)
- This Old Man (1986)
- Pig-Out Inn (1988)
- Miriam's Well (1995)
- Skin Deep (1996)
- Steal Away Home (1999)
- Swindletop (2000)
- Soon Be Free (2002)
- The Moxie Kid (2003)
- Journey to Jamestown (2005)
- Shanghai Shadows (2006)
- The Secret of Laurel Oaks (2008), a book in 208 worldCat libraries about a girl named Lila and a girl named Daphne
- Strike! Mother Jones and the Colorado Coal Field War (2012)
- Rebel Spirits (2013)
- The Doll Graveyard (2014)
- The Secret Grave (2017)
- Red Menace (2020)
- Eddie Whatever (2021)
- Gallows Hill (2023)
