= Roderick Townley =

American writer

- Born: June 7, 1942 (age 84)
- Occupation: Writer
- Writing career
- Genres: Young adult fiction, Poetry, Literary criticism, Adult fiction
- Website: www.rodericktownley.com

Roderick Townley (born June 7, 1942) is an American author of juvenile, young adult, and adult books, including books of poetry, nonfiction, and literary criticism. He received his Ph.D. from Rutgers University, New Brunswick, and was for many years a poet and fiction writer, and for a time lived in New York City and wrote for TV Guide, The Village Voice and other publications. In 2001, he began the Sylvie Cycle, a metafictional series about the spunky, fictional Princess Sylvie who lives her life in a book.

== Biography ==
Roderick Townley has published over a dozen books, comprising poetry, fiction, nonfiction, and literary criticism. The Sylvie Cycle, his trilogy of middle grade novels, has been widely praised and appears in several foreign editions, as well as in large print and audio versions. He has also written two young adult novels, Sky (Atheneum, 2004), and The Red Thread: A Novel in Three Incarnations (Atheneum, 2007).

Mr. Townley taught in Chile on a Fulbright scholarship, worked in New York City as an editor, and now writes from his home in Kansas. Along the way, he has won a number of honors, including the Peregrine Prize for Short Fiction, the Thorpe Menn Award, the Kansas Arts Commission Fellowship in Fiction, the Kansas Governor’s Arts Award, and First Prize in two contests sponsored by the Academy of American Poets. His novel, The Great Good Thing (the first volume in The Sylvie Cycle), was a Top Ten Book Sense Pick and has been optioned for film.

Townley continues to write poetry, publishing his work in The Paris Review, The Yale Review, The North American Review, and other journals.

Mr. Townley has two children, Jesse and Grace, and is married to poet and yoga instructor Wyatt Townley.

== Bibliography ==
=== Poetry ===
- Blue Angels Black Angels (1972)
- Three Musicians (1978)
- Final Approach (1986)

=== Literary criticism ===
- The Early Poetry of William Carlos Williams (1975)
- Night Errands: How Poets Use Dreams (1998)

=== Adult fiction ===
- Minor Gods, St. Martin’s Press (1977)

=== Young adult ===
- The Great Good Thing: The Sylvie Cycle, Book One (2001)
- Into The Labyrinth: The Sylvie Cycle, Book Two (2002)
- Sky (2004)
- The Constellation of Sylvie: The Sylvie Cycle, Book Three (2005)
- The Red Thread (2007)
- The Blue Shoe (2009)
- The Door in the Forest (2011)
- A Bitter Magic (2015)

== External links/references ==
- Roderick Townley's Official Webpage
- Simon & Schuster: Roderick Townley
- Kansas Poets: Roderick Townley
