= Gloria Skurzynski =

American writer

- Born: Gloria Joan Skurzynski; July 6, 1930 (age 96); Duquesne, Pennsylvania, U.S.
- Education: Mount Mercy College
- Occupation: Writer
- Spouse: Edward Joseph Skurzynski (m. 1951)
- Children: 5
- Parent(s): Aylmer Kearney Flister; Serena Decker Flister
- Writing career
- Genres: Fiction; non-fiction
- Notable work: Good-bye, Billy Radish (1992)

Gloria Joan Skurzynski (born July 6, 1930) is an American writer of books for young people, including both fiction and non-fiction.

== Early life and education ==
Gloria Joan Flister Skurzynski was born in Duquesne, Pennsylvania in 1930 to Aylmer Kearney Flister and Serena Decker Flister. Her father worked at a steel mill, while her mother worked as a telegraph operator. She grew up during the Great Depression. She was educated at Carlow University in 1948, which at that time was known as Mount Mercy College. She disliked school, however, and dropped out to work as a statistical clerk at the U.S. Steel in Pittsburgh from 1950 to 1952. She met Edward Joseph Skurzynski while working there, and they were married in December 1951. They went on to have five children, and later moved to Salt Lake City, Utah. Skurzynski and her husband Edward currently reside in Boise, Idaho.

== Career ==
Skurzynski is the author of more than sixty books written for young readers. She became friends with Phyllis McGinley, poet who won a Pulitzer Prize in 1965. Through their correspondence, McGinley convinced Skurzynski to try professional writing. Skyrzynski's first professional writing attempt was rejected 58 times before her first publication made it into Teen Magazine. Skurzynski was also published in School and Library Journal magazines. It was reported that she was inspired by one of her daughter's poems in 1966 to become a free-lance writer.

In 1979, she became a professional writer, and shifted her focus to children's novels. Four Winds Press published her first children's novel, What Happened in Hamelin? in 1979. She is also the author of The Tempering (1983) and Good-bye, Billy Radish (1992).

In her writing, Skurzynski draws on her life experiences, including her father's stories and her own childhood in Pittsburgh. Many of her books include themes about national parks, astronomy, and animals.

Skurzynski is also the author of several non-fiction books. These include Bionic Parts for People: The Real Story of Artificial Organs and Replacement Parts which was published in 1978, and Are We Alone?: Scientists Search for Life in Space which was published in 2004. More recently, she collaborated with her daughter, Alane Ferguson to write a series of books for National Geographic Society called Mysteries in Our National Parks. To write these books, Skurzynski did most of the technical research on the subjects, while her daughter wrote the dialogue.

Before becoming a professional writer, Skurzynski was involved with the Girl Scouts of the USA. She wrote a play for them to perform in 1964 entitled The Golden Chain.

== Awards ==
Skurzynski received an Outstanding Science Trade Book for Children award from the National Science Teachers Association (NSTA) in 1991. Later more of her books have received the same award. Her book Good-bye, Billy Radish was named the Best Book of the Year by the School Library Journal and was also awarded a Judy Lopez Memorial Book by the Women's National Book Association. In 2002, Skurzynski received two Golden Spur Awards from the Western Writers of America for Rockbuster. She was also awarded a Science Writing Award from the American Institute of Physics, as well as a Golden Kite Award. She was also the recipient of a Christopher Award from the Western Writers of America.

== Selected works ==
=== Mysteries in Our National Parks ===
- Mysteries In Our National Parks: Ghost Horses: A Mystery in Zion National Park (2007)
- Mysteries in Our National Parks: Wolf Stalker: A Mystery in Yellowstone National Park (2007)
- Mysteries in Our National Parks: Night of the Black Bear: A Mystery in Great Smoky Mountains National Park (2007)
- Mysteries in Our National Parks: Cliff-Hanger: A Mystery in Mesa Verde National Park (2007)
- Mysteries in Our National Parks: The Hunted: A Mystery in Glacier National Park (2007)
- Mysteries in Our National Parks: Deadly Waters: A Mystery in Everglades National Park (2007)
- Mysteries in Our National Parks: Over The Edge (2008)
- Mysteries in Our National Parks: Valley of Death: A Mystery in Death Valley National Park (2008)
- Mysteries in Our National Parks: Escape From Fear: A Mystery in Virgin Islands National Park (2008)
- Mysteries in Our National Parks: Buried Alive: A Mystery in Denali National Park (2008)
- Mysteries in Our National Parks: Out of the Deep: A Mystery in Acadia National Park (2008)

=== The Virtual War Chronologs ===
- Virtual War (1997)
- The Clones (2002)
- The Revolt (2005)
- The Choice (2006)

=== Others ===
- The Magic Pumpkin (1971)
- The Remarkable Journey of Gustavus Bell (1973)
- The Poltergeist of Jason Morey (1975)
- In a Bottle with a Cork on Top (1976)
- Two Fools and a Faker: Three Lebanese Folk Tales (1977)
- Bionic Parts for People: The Real Story of Artificial Organs and Replacement Parts (1978)
- Martin by Himself (1979)
- Honest Andrew (1980)
- Safeguarding the Land: Women at Work in Parks, Forests, and Rangelands (1981)
- Manwolf (1981)
- Swept in the Wave of Terror (1985)
- The Minstrel In The Tower (1988)
- Robots: Your High-Tech World (1990)
- Almost the Real Thing: Simulation in Your High-Tech World (1991)
- Here Comes the Mail (1992)
- Get the Message: Telecommunications in Your High-Tech World (1993)
- Lost in the Devil's Desert (1982)
- Know the Score (1994)
- Zero Gravity (1994)
- Trapped in the Slickrock Canyon (1994)
- Caitlin's Big Idea (1995)
- Cyberstorm (1995)
- Waves (1996)
- Good-bye, Billy Radish (1996)
- Mystery Of The Fire In The Sky (1997)
- Wolf Stalker: National Park's Mystery #1 (1998)
- Discover Mars (1998)
- Cliff-Hanger (1998)
- Spider's Voice (1999)
- Rage Of Fire (1999)
- Deadly Waters (1999)
- On Time (2000)
- The Hunted (2000)
- Ghost Horses (2000)
- The Tempering (2000)
- Rockbuster (2001)
- Escape From Fear (2002)
- Out Of The Deep (2002)
- Running Scared (2002)
- Are We Alone? Scientists Search for Life in Space (2004)
- Sweat and Blood: A History of U.S. Labor Unions (2008)
- This Is Rocket Science: True Stories of the Risk-taking Scientists who Figure Out Ways to Explore Beyond Earth (2010)
