= G. Clifton Wisler =

American writer

G. Clifton Wisler (1950 – 2006) was an American historical novelist, the author of almost 70 books, many of them historical fiction for young adults. Wisler lived in Plano, Texas in the United States. He died on April 7, 2006.

Wisler's work, most of which had appeared only in mass-market paperback form, can be divided into several distinct categories: historical fiction for young adults (distinguished in the following list as YA), mostly concerned with early Texas history or the Civil War; mainstream Westerns, particularly the Delamer series; Westerns told from an Indian viewpoint (NA); and science fiction.

== Bibliography ==
=== Young adult fiction ===
- Red Cap (1984)
- Buffalo Moon (1984)
- Wolf's Tooth (1987)
- This New Land (1987; Walker's American History Series for Young People)
- Piper's Ferry (1990)
- The Raid (1994)
- Jericho's Journey (1995)
- Thunder on the Tennessee (1995)
- Mr. Lincoln's Drummer (1997)
- Caleb's Choice (1998)
- The Drummer Boy of Vicksburg (1999)
- Mustang Flats (1999)
- Run the Blockade (2000)
- All for Texas: A Story of Texas Liberation (2000; Jamestown's American Portraits)
- Kings Mountain (2002)

=== Westerns ===
- Winter of the Wolf (1981)
- West of the Cimarron (1985)
- Antelope Springs (1986)
- A Cry of Angry Thunder (1986)
- High Plains Rider (1986)
- Starr's Showdown (1986)
- Abrego Canyon (1987)
- Thompson's Mountain (1987)
- Illinois Prescott (1987)
- My Brother the Wind (1987)
- Comanche Summer (1987)
- Sweetwater Flats (1988)
- Avery's Law (1988)
- Ross's Gap (1988)
- The Return of Caulfield Blake (1989)
- Among the Eagles (1989)
- Lakota (1990)
- Boswell's Luck (1990)
- North of Esperanza (1991)
- Pinto Lowery (1991)
- Esmeralda (1997)
- Under the Black Hills (1999)

=== Delamer series ===
- The Trident Brand (1982)
- Purgatory (1986)
- The Wayward Trail (1987)
- South Pass Ambush (1988)
- Sam Delamer (1989)
- Clear Fork (1990)
- Blood Mesa (1991)
- Baron of the Brazos (1991)

=== Jake Wetherby duo ===
- The Shawnee Trail (1993)
- The Wetherbys (2000)

=== Texas Brazos series ===
- Texas Brazos (1987)
- Fortune Bend (1987)
- Palo Pinto (1987)
- Caddo Creek (1988)

=== Darby Prescott series ===
- Prescott's Trail (1989)
- Prescott's Law (1990)
- Prescott's Challenge (1990)

=== Miscellaneous ===
- Spirit Warrior (1986)
- Warrior's Road (1994)
- The Weeping Moon (1995)
- Massacre at Powder River (1997)

The Medicine Trail:

- The Medicine Trail (1991)
- Stone Wolf's Vision (1991)
- The Buffalo Shield (1992)
- Dreaming Wolf (1992)
- The Antrian Messenger (1986)
- The Seer (1989)
- The Mind Trap (1990)
- The Chicken Must Have Died Laughing (1983)
- A Special Gift (1983)

=== Nonfiction ===
- When Johnny Went Marching: Young Americans Fight the Civil War (2001)
