= William Anderson (American writer) =

American author, historian and lecturer

- Born: 1952 (age 73–74)
- Occupations: Author; historian; lecturer
- Website: williamandersonbooks.com

William Anderson (born 1952) is an American author, educator and lecturer.

His interest in American frontier began after reading Little House on the Prairie. While attending Albion College as an undergraduate student majoring in English and History he worked for the Laura Ingalls Wilder Memorial Society in DeSmet, South Dakota. He is a director of the Laura Ingalls Wilder Home and Museum in Mansfield, Missouri and is a board member of the Wilder Home Association which runs the museum. He works as a teacher in Michigan.

His many recognitions for writing include the Western History Association's Billington Award, the Robinson award of the South Dakota State Historical Society, National Endowment for the Humanities awards and National Council for the Social Studies. In September 2002, he was invited to the White House for the third of Laura Bush's American Authors Symposia. The First Lady, a former teacher, and librarian assembled scholars, authors, and historians for a conference on the frontier experience.

== Works ==
=== About the Ingalls and Wilder families ===
- The Story of the Ingalls (Mansfield, MO: L.I.W. Home & Museum, 1967), 14 pp., LCCN 71-268397; revised ed. 1993, 44 pp., LCCN 93-215817 – booklet
- Laura Wilder of Mansfield (1968); reissued 1974 by the L.I.W. Memorial Society – booklet
- A Wilder in the West: the story of Eliza Jane Wilder (De Smet, SD: L.I.W. Memorial Society, 1971) – booklet
- The Story of the Wilders (L.I.W. Home and Museum, 1973), reissued by the L.I.W. Memorial Society – booklet
- The Ingalls Family Album (L.I.W. Memorial Society, 1973), LCCN 73-173348; revised 1976, LCCN 77-356605 – 20 and 24 pp. booklets
- Laura's Rose: the story of Rose Wilder Lane (L.I.W. Memorial Society, 1976) – booklet
- The Pepin Story of the Ingalls Family (Pepin, WI: L.I.W. Memorial Society, 1981), 20 pp. – The Story of the Ingalls (1967), revised in Pepin with permission of Anderson, LCCN 81-183450
- Laura Ingalls Wilder, Pioneer, and Author (New York: Kipling Press, 1987), foreword by Ruth Alexander, 54 pp., LCCN 88-138423
- The Walnut Grove Story of Laura Ingalls Wilder (Walnut Grove, MN: L.I.W. Museum, 1987) – booklet, LCCN 87-181609
- Laura Ingalls Wilder: a biography (Harper, 1988); 1992, LCCN 91-33805
- Little House Country: a photo guide to the home sites of Laura Ingalls Wilder (Kansas City, MO: Terrell Publ., 1989), photos by Leslie A. Kelly – 48 pp., OCLC 20654987; Japan: Kyuryudo Art Publ., 1988; Harper, 1990, 119 pp., LCCN 89-46512
- Laura Ingalls Wilder: the Iowa story (Burr Oak, IA: L.I.W. Park & Museum, 1990) – booklet
- The Little House Guidebook (Harper, 1996), photos by Kelly – 96 pp., OCLC 32855145, LCCN 95-33200; updated 2002, LCCN 2002-279965
- Pioneer Girl: the story of Laura Ingalls Wilder (Harper, 1996), unpaged picture book, illus. Dan Andreasen, OCLC 35029708
- Laura's Album: a remembrance scrapbook of Laura Ingalls Wilder (Harper, 1998) – "photographs and mementos accompany an account of the life and literary career", OCLC 865396917
- Prairie Girl: the life of Laura Ingalls Wilder (Harper, 2004), 74 pp., illus. Renée Graef, OCLC 51923921
- Laura Ingalls Wilder's Walnut Grove (Walnut Grove, MN: L.I.W. Museum, 2013), 96 pp., LCCN 2015-373290

=== As editor ===
- The Horn Book's Laura Ingalls Wilder: articles about and by Laura Ingalls Wilder, Garth Williams, and the Little House Books (Boston, Horn Book, 1987), 48 pp., LCCN 87-181392
1. "Laura Ingalls Wilder and the Little House Books", Irene Smith
2. "A Tribute to Laura Ingalls Wilder", J.D.L.
3. "Illustrating the Little House Books", Garth Williams
4. "The Discovery of Laura Ingalls Wilder", Virginia Kirkus – Horn Book Magazine 29 (December 1953): 428–29
5. "Christmas in the Little House Books", Marcia Dalphin
6. "Laura's Gingerbread - Recipe"
7. "A Letter from Laura Ingalls Wilder"
- A Little House Sampler (U. of Nebraska, 1988), Ingalls Wilder and Wilder Lane, LCCN 87-19208
- The Laura Ingalls Wilder Country Cookbook (Harper, 1995), LCCN 94-42326 – features recipes from Ingalls Wilder's personal collection, photos by Leslie A. Kelly, OCLC 31433784
- A Little House Reader: a collection of writings (Harper, 1998), Ingalls Wilder, LCCN 97-2767

=== Other books ===
- Michigan's Marguerite de Angeli: the story of Lapeer's native author-illustrator (Lapeer, MI: Marguerite de Angeli Library, 1987), 60 pp., LCCN 87-404646
- The World of Louisa May Alcott: a first-time glimpse into the life and times of Louisa May Alcott, author of "Little Women" (Japan: Kyuryudo Art Publ., 1992; Harper, 1995), 120 pp., photos by David Wade, LCCN 95-24373
- The World of the Trapp Family: the life story of the legendary family who inspired "The Sound of Music" (Davison, MI: Anderson Publ., 1998), 168 pp., photos by David Wade – distributed by the Trapp Family Lodge, Stowe VT, LCCN 98-156063
- River Boy: the story of Mark Twain (2002), unpaged picture book, illus. by Dan Andreasen, OCLC 459795517
- M is for Mount Rushmore: a South Dakota alphabet (Chelsea, MI: Sleeping Bear Press, 2005), illus. Cheryl Harness, OCLC 57201825
- V is for von Trapp: a musical family alphabet (Ann Arbor, MI: Sleeping Bear, 2010), illus. Linda Dockey Graves, OCLC 553368554

=== Magazine articles ===
Articles by Anderson have appeared in several periodical publications.

- American History Illustrated
- The Christian Science Monitor
- The Horn Book Magazine
- The Saturday Evening Post
- Travel + Leisure
