= June Rae Wood =

American author (born 1946)

- Born: 1946 (age 79–80); Versailles, Missouri, U.S.
- Occupation: Novelist
- Writing career
- Genre: Realistic fiction
- Notable works: The Man Who Loved Clowns, Turtle on a Fence Post, When Pigs Fly, About Face, On Her Way: Stories and Poems About Growing Up Girl, and A Share of Freedom.

June Rae Wood is an American author. One of her books, The Man Who Loved Clowns, won the Mark Twain Award and William Allen White Award in 1995.

== Early life ==
June Rae Wood grew up in Versailles, Missouri, with seven siblings. Her brother, Richard, who had Down syndrome, was her inspiration for The Man Who Loved Clowns. June's other brothers and sisters had to protect Richard from other people who would be mean to him. Many people would laugh and stare, but Richard thought this was a compliment.
