= Terry Trueman =

American writer

Terry Trueman (born December 15, 1947) is a Printz Award-winning author of young adult fiction, with his best known book being Stuck in Neutral, as well as books of poetry and short stories for adults and children.

Born in Birmingham, Alabama, Trueman has lived in Spokane, Washington since 1974. He also had a home in Tucson, Arizona for many years. He holds master's degrees in applied psychology and creative writing.

== Early life ==
Trueman grew up in the northern suburbs of Seattle, Washington with his parents. His father, Sydney M. Trueman, was a fighter pilot in World War II and won the Air Medal flying off the Aircraft Carrier USS Ticonderoga. He has one sister.

== Education ==
Trueman struggled in school, especially during middle school and high school, but graduated from Shoreline H.S. in 1966. He attended Shoreline Community College and Everett Community College in the following couple years, prior to enrolling at the University of Washington in 1968, where he earned his bachelor's degree in 1973, majoring in Creative Writing in English. He received a Master of Science in Developmental Psychology from Eastern Washington State College in 1975. He pursued further graduate study in the Education Dept. of Washington State University between 1980 and 1981. He received a Master of Fine Arts degree from Eastern Washington University in 1984. Trueman was 'lifetime' certified as a K-12 licensed Teacher in 1973.

== Career as a writer ==
His first novel, Stuck in Neutral was published in 2001, and was inspired by his son Sheehan, who was born a quadriplegic with cerebral palsy. The disease severely crippled his son and threatened to overwhelm Trueman, who eventually turned his shock and grief into a narrative poem, Sheehan, which in turn grew to become the novel, Stuck in Neutral. Trueman released two other companion novels for teens, Cruise Control (2004) and Life Happens Next (2012), as well as a non-fiction book about his son, Sheehan: Heartbreak and Redemption (2007).

Trueman's favorite author is Charles Bukowski. Like Bukowski, Trueman had written his whole life but only gained recognition later, when he was 52.

== Selected works ==
- Stuck in Neutral (1st ed.). New York: HarperCollins. 2000. ISBN 9780064472135.
- Inside out (1st ed.). New York: HarperCollins. 2003. ISBN 9780066239637.
- Swallowing the sun. London: Hodder Children's. 2003. ISBN 9780340866412.
- Cruise control (1st ed.). New York: HarperCollins. 2004. ISBN 9780066239606.
- No Right Turn (1st ed.). New York: HarperTempest. 2005. ISBN 9780060574925.

== Awards ==
- Michael L. Printz Honor Award, 2001
