= Peter Lourie =

Peter King Lourie (born in Michigan, United States) is an author of nonfiction books for adults and children.

== Biography ==
Born in Ann Arbor, Michigan, Lourie graduated from Collegiate School in New York City. He received his bachelor's degree in classics from NYU, an MA in English Literature at the University of Maine, and an MFA in nonfiction writing at Columbia University. He has taught at Columbia College, University of Vermont, University of Maine, and Middlebury College where he taught environmental and adventure/travel writing & digital storytelling. He is a member of the Society of Environmental Journalists, and in 2019 was elected a Fellow at the Explorers Club. Lourie is married with two children.

== Bibliography ==
- Locked in Ice! Nansen’s Daring Quest for the North Pole
- Jack London and the Klondike Gold Rush
- The Polar Bear Scientists (Scientists in the Field series)
- The Manatee Scientists: Saving Vulnerable Species (Scientists in the Field series)
- Writing to Explore: Discovering Adventure in the Research Paper, 3-8
- Whaling Season: A Year in the Life of an Arctic Whale Scientist (Scientists in the Field series)
- On the Texas Trail of Cabeza de Vaca
- Arctic Thaw: The People of the Whale in a Changing Climate
- Hidden World of the Aztec
- Lost Treasures of the Inca
- The Mystery of the Maya
- First Dive to Shark Dive
- The Lost World of the Anasazi
- Tierra del Fuego: A Journey to the End of the Earth
- Amazon: A Journey Through the Last Frontier
- On the Trail of Lewis and Clark: A journey up the Missouri River
- Erie Canal: Canoeing America's Great Waterway
- Everglades: Buffalo Tiger and the River of Grass
- Hudson River: An Adventure from the Mountains to the Sea
- Mississippi River: A journey Down the Father of Waters
- Rio Grande: From the Rocky Mountains to the Gulf of Mexico
- On the Trail of Sacagawea
- Yukon River: An Adventure to the Gold Fields of the Klondike
- The Lost Treasure of Captain Kid (novel)
- River of Mountains: A Canoe Journey Down the Hudson (nonfiction for adults)
- Sweat of the Sun, Tears of the Moon: A Chronicle of an Incan Treasure (nonfiction for adults)
