= Robert J. Burch =

American novelist

- Born: June 25, 1925; Fayette County, Georgia, US
- Died: December 25, 2007 (aged 82); Fayette County, Georgia
- Occupation: Writer
- Writing career
- Period: 1960–2007
- Genres: Children's literature, realist young-adult novels, historical fiction
- Notable works: Queenie Peavy (1966); Ida Early Comes Over the Mountain (1980)
- Notable awards: Phoenix Award; 1986

Robert Joseph Burch (June 25, 1925 – December 25, 2007) was an American writer of 19 children's books whose readers are "usually young adolescents". Many of his stories are based on his childhood experiences in rural Georgia during the Great Depression.

He was born in Fayette County, Georgia, and spent the majority of his life there. Robert J. Burch Elementary School in Tyrone is named for him. In 1943 he joined the army.

== Career ==
Burch began writing in New York City in the early 1960s.

According to Dictionary of Literary Biography, his best books feature "realistic details of country and small-town life in middle and northern Georgia" during the Great Depression, the setting of his own childhood. "His books are infused with his genial, optimistic view of life while maintaining a realistic, nonsentimental, serious, and moralistic approach."

== Awards ==
Burch and Queenie Peavy won the second annual Phoenix Award from the Children's Literature Association in 1986, recognizing the best children's book published twenty years earlier that did not win a major award. Burch received four Georgia Children's Book Awards and in 2007 the inaugural W. Porter Kellam Lifetime Achievement Award (after a University of Georgia Library director) for outstanding contributions to literary life in Georgia. In 2009, Burch was inducted into the Georgia Writers Hall of Fame.
