= Janice N. Harrington =

American poet and children's writer

- Born: 1956 (age 69–70); Vernon, Alabama
- Education: University of Nebraska–Lincoln; University of Iowa (MLS)
- Occupations: poet and children's writer
- Website: https://janiceharrington.com/

Janice N. Harrington is an American storyteller, poet, and children's writer.

== Life ==
She grew up in Vernon, Alabama. Her family moved to Lincoln, Nebraska to escape racial segregation when she was eight. She now lives in Illinois.

Her work appears in African American Review, Alaska Quarterly Review, Beloit Poetry Journal, Harvard Review, Indiana Review, Field, Prairie Schooner, Southern Review, Black Nature and other journals.

== Career ==
She worked as a public librarian in Champaign, Illinois, and as a professional storyteller, appearing at the National Storytelling Festival. Harrington was also the coordinator of youth services and a caregiver at the Champaign Public library. She is now a professor in the Creative Writing Program at the University of Illinois at Urbana-Champaign.

== Selected awards ==
- 2009 Rona Jaffe Foundation Writers' Award
- 2008 Kate Tufts Discovery Award, for Even the Hollow My Body Made Is Gone
- 2008 A. Poulin, Jr. Poetry Prize
- 2007 National Endowment for the Arts Literature Fellowship for Poetry
- 2007 TIME Magazine's top 10 children's books
- 2007 Cybils Award for the year's best fiction picture book: "the children’s and YA bloggers’ literary awards"
- 2005 Ezra Jack Keats New Writer Award, for Going North
- Illinois Arts Council Literary Award

== Works ==
=== Poetry ===
- Yard Show. BOA Editions, Ltd. 2024. ISBN 9781960145314.
- Primitive: The Art and Life of Horace H. Pippin. BOA Editions, Ltd. 2016. ISBN 978-1-942683-20-9.
- The Hands of Strangers: Poems from the Nursing Home. BOA Editions, Ltd. 2011. ISBN 978-1-934414-54-5.
- Even the Hollow My Body Made Is Gone. BOA Editions, Ltd. 2007. ISBN 978-1-929918-89-8.
- "They All Sang". Harvard Review (28). 2005. Archived from the original on 2009-06-30.
- "Shaking the Grass", Verse Daily

=== Children's ===
- Buzzing with Questions: The Inquisitive Mind of Charles Henry Turner. Illustrator Theodore Taylor III. Calkins Creek. 2019. ISBN 978-1-629-79558-4.
- Catching a Storyfish. WordSong. 2016. ISBN 978-1-62979-429-7.
- Busy-Busy Little Chick. Illustrator Brian Pinkney. Farrar, Straus and Giroux. 2013. ISBN 978-0-374-34746-8.
- Roberto Walks Home. Illustrator Jody Wheeler. Viking Penguin. 2008. ISBN 978-0-670-06316-1.
- The Chicken Chasing Queen of Lamar County. Illustrator Shelley Jackson. Farrar, Straus and Giroux. 2007. ISBN 978-0-374-31251-0.
- Going North. Illustrator Jerome Lagarrigue. Farrar, Straus and Giroux. 2004. ISBN 978-0-374-32681-4.
