= Brian Katcher =

American author (born 1975)

- Born: 1975 (age 50–51); St. Louis, Missouri, U.S.
- Occupation: Author
- Children: 1
- Writing career
- Genre: Young adult fiction
- Notable work: Almost Perfect (2009)
- Website: www.briankatcher.com

Brian Katcher (born 1975) is an American author of young adult fiction. His novel Almost Perfect won the 2011 Stonewall Book Award.

== Biography ==
Brian Katcher was born in St. Louis, Missouri, in 1975. He attended the University of Missouri in Columbia, Missouri, then traveled and worked a variety of jobs before beginning his career as a writer. As of 2021, Katcher was living in central Missouri with his wife and daughter.

== Awards and honors ==
The American Library Association included Almost Perfect on their list of ALA Rainbow Book List (2010), Popular Paperbacks for Young Adults (2012), and Amazing Audiobooks for Young Adults (2013).

Year	Title	Award	Result	Ref.
2011	Almost Perfect	James Cook Book Award	Nominee	
2011	Almost Perfect	Stonewall Book Award	Winner	
2011	Playing with Matches	Missouri Gateway Readers Award	Nominee	
2011	Playing with Matches	North Carolina Young Adult Book Award	Winner	
2017	The Improbable Theory of Ana and Zak	Missouri Gateway Readers Award	Nominee	
2020	Deacon Locke Went to Prom	South Carolina Book Award for Young Adult	Nominee	

== Publications ==
- Playing with Matches. Delacorte Books for Young Readers. 2008. ISBN 9780385735445.
- Almost Perfect. Delacorte Books for Young Readers. 2009. ISBN 9780385736657.
- Everyone Dies in the End. Dark Continents Publishing. 2014. ISBN 9780615710174.
- The Improbable Theory of Ana and Zak. Katherine Tegen Books. 2015. ISBN 9780062272775.
- Deacon Locke Went to Prom. Katherine Tegen Books. 2017. ISBN 9780062422521.
