= C. S. Adler =

American children's book author (born 1932)

- Born: Carole Schwerdtfeger Adler; February 23, 1932 (age 94); New York
- Occupations: teacher, children's author
- Writing career
- Language: English
- Genre: Children's books
- Notable work: The Magic of the Glits
- Notable awards: William Allen White Award and the Golden Kite Award for The Magic of Glits
- Website: www.c-s-adler.com

C.S. (Carole Schwerdtfeger) Adler (born February 23, 1932) is an American children's book author. She has been a full-time writer since the 1979 publication of her first book, The Magic of the Glits, which won both the William Allen White Award and the Golden Kite Award.

== Books ==
Adler has published over 40 books for young readers. Many of her books have been on state lists, and have been published in Japan, Germany, England, Denmark, Austria, Sweden, and France.

== Awards ==
- The Magic of the Glits won the William Allen White Award and the Golden Kite Award.
- The Shell Lady's Daughter was chosen by the A.L.A. as one of the best young adult books of 1983.
- With Westie and the Tin Man won the Children's Book Award of the Child Study Committee in 1986.
- Split Sisters & Ghost Brother were I.R.A. Children's Choices selections.
- One Sister Too Many was on the 1991 Young Adults' Choices list.
- Always and Forever Friends & Eddie's Blue Winged Dragon were on the 1991 I.R.A. 99 Favorite Paperbacks list.
- One Unhappy Horse won the ASPCA Henry Berg Award in 2002.

== Background and personal life ==
Adler moved to Tucson, Arizona, after spending most of her life in upstate New York, where before publishing she was a middle school English teacher in the Niskayuna school district, for nearly a decade.

== Bibliography ==
- The Magic of the Glits
- The Silver Coach
- In Our House Scott Is My Brother
- Shelter on Blue Barns Road
- Down by the River
- The Cat That Was Left Behind
- The Once in a While Hero
- Some Other Summer
- The Evidence That Wasn't There
- Footsteps On the Stairs
- Get Lost, Little Brother
- The Shell Lady's Daughter
- Roadside Valentine
- Fly Free
- Shadows on Little Reef Bay
- With Westie and the Tin Man
- Binding Ties
- Split Sisters
- Kiss the Clown
- Good-Bye Pink Pig
- Carly's Buck
- Always and Forever Friends
- Eddie's Blue-Winged Dragon
- If You Need Me
- One Sister Too Many
- The Lump in the Middle
- Help, Pink Pig
- Ghost Brother
- Mismatched Summer
- Tribe for Lexi
- Tuna Fish Thanksgiving
- Daddy's Climbing Tree
- Willie, the Frog Prince
- That Horse Whiskey!
- Youn Hee And Me
- Courtyard Cat
- More Than a Horse
- Her Blue Straw Hat
- Winning
- Not Just a Summer Crush
- One Unhappy Horse
- What's to Be Scared Of, Suki?
- The No Place Cat
- Saving Dove: One Unhappy Horse
- Timothy and Jacob the Two Trumpet Players
- Taylor Giais the Girl
