= Alane Ferguson =

American mystery writer (born 1957)

Alane Ferguson (born 1957) is an American author. She won the Edgar Award for Best Young Adult Mystery novel in 1990 for Show Me the Evidence.

Ferguson was born in Cumberland, Maryland, in 1957. Her mother is children's author Gloria Skurzynski. Ferguson collaborated with her mother on a series of novels titled Mysteries in Our National Parks for the National Geographic Society.

Ferguson is the author of many novels and mysteries, including the Edgar Award-winning Show Me The Evidence. She does intensive research for her books by attending autopsies and interviewing forensic pathologists.

== Works ==
- The Dying Breath, September 2009
- Circle Of Blood, Viking, 2007 hardcover, 2007
- Angel of Death, Viking, 2006 hardcover, 2006
- The Christopher Killer, Viking, 2006 hardcover, 2006
- Buried Alive, National Geographic, 2003 paperback, 2003
- Escape from Fear, National Geographic, 2002 paperback, 2002
- Out of the Deep, National Geographic, 2002 paperback, 2002
- Running Scared, National Geographic, 2002 paperback. 2002
- Over the Edge, National Geographic, 2001 paperback, 2001
- Valley of Death, National Geographic, 2001 paperback, 2001
- Ghost Horses, National Geographic, 2000 paperback, 2001
- The Hunted, National Geographic, 2000 paperback, 2001
- Deadly Waters, National Geographic, 1999 paperback, 2001
- Cliff-Hanger, National Geographic, 1999 paperback, 2001
- Rage of Fire, National Geographic, 1998 paperback, 2001
- Wolf Stalker, National Geographic, 1997 paperback, 2001
- The Mystery of the Fire in the Sky, Troll Associates|Troll Books, 1997
- The Mystery of the Vanishing Creatures, Troll Books, 1996
- The Mystery of the Spooky Shadow, Troll Books, 1996
- Secrets, Simon & Schuster, 1997
- Night Terrors, an anthology, 1996
- See You in September, Avon Books, 1995
- A Tumbleweed Christmas, Bradbury Press, 1995
- Poison, Bradbury Press, 1994
- Stardust, Bradbury Press, 1993
- Overkill, Bradbury Press, 1992
- The Practical Joke War, Bradbury Press, 1991
- Cricket and the Crackerbox Kid, Bradbury Press, 1990
- Show Me the Evidence, Bradbury Press, 1989
- That New Pet, Lothrop Lee & Shephard, 1987
