= David L. Harrison =

American children's author and poet (born 1937)

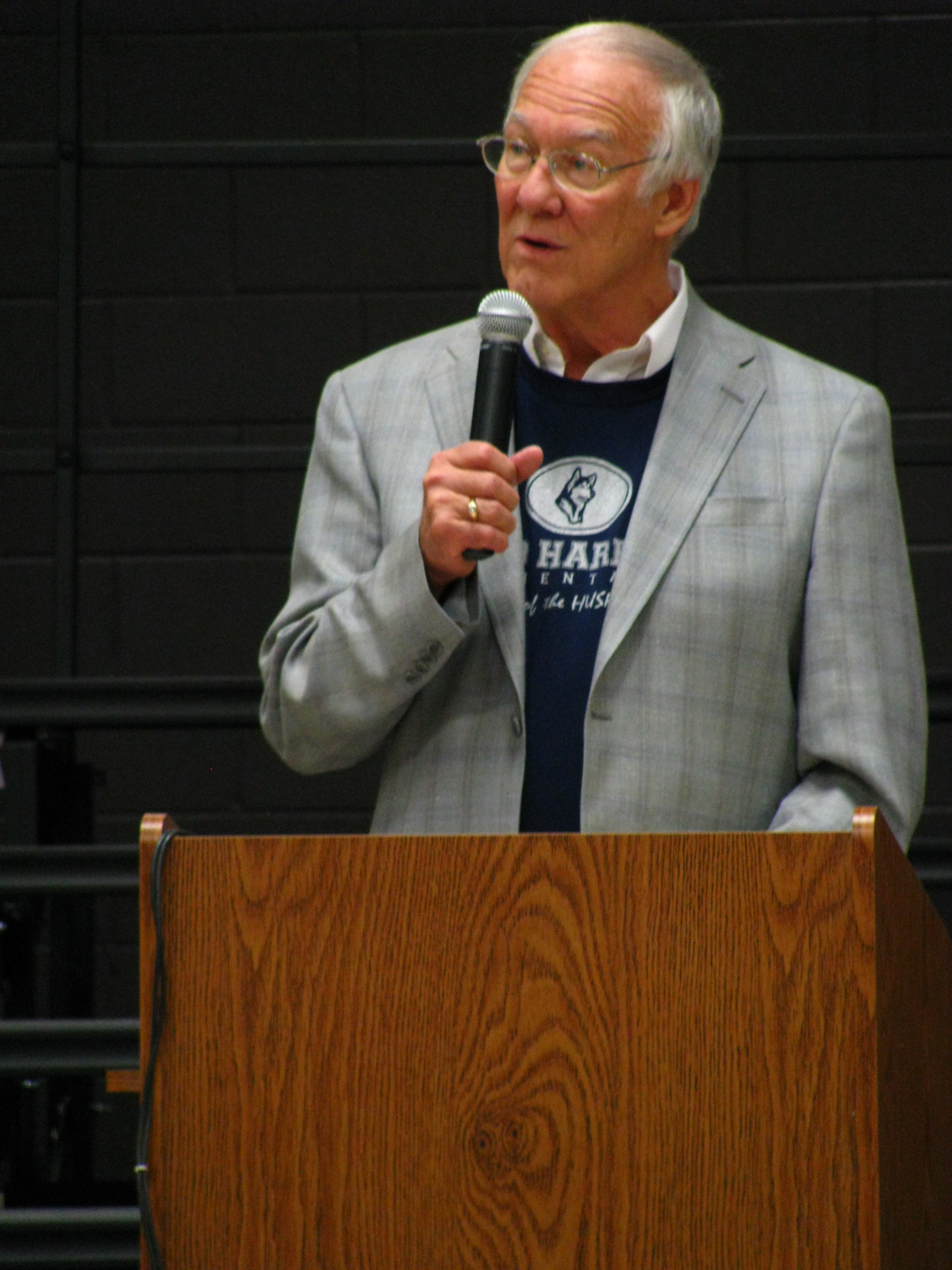
- Harrison at the opening of David L. Harrison Elementary
- Born: David Lee Harrison; March 13, 1937 (age 89)
- Education: Drury University (BA); Emory University (MS)
- Occupations: Author; poet
- Spouse: Sandy
- Children: 2
- Writing career
- Genre: Children's literature

David Lee Harrison (born March 13, 1937) is an American children's author and poet.

== Professional career ==
Harrison's poetry, fiction, and nonfiction for young readers have been anthologized in more than 200 books, translated into twelve languages, sandblasted into a library sidewalk, painted on a bookmobile, and presented on television, radio, podcast, and video stream. Eighteen of his 108 books are professional works for teachers. He is currently serving as State of Missouri Poet Laureate (July 2023-June 2025) and Drury University Poet Laureate (1983–present). David Harrison Elementary School in Springfield, Missouri, is named after him. He has given keynote talks, college commencement addresses, and been featured at hundreds of conferences, workshops, literature festivals, and schools across America.

He earned a Bachelor of Arts degree from Drury University in 1959, a Master of Science degree from Emory University in 1960, and two Honorary Doctor of Letters degrees. His poetry collections, Pirates (2003) and Crawly School for Bugs (2018), represented Missouri at the National Book Fair in Washington, D.C.

== Work history ==
- 1953–58 Musician: Principal trombonist, symphony orchestra, Springfield, Missouri
- 1959– Writer: stories for adult market; fiction, nonfiction, poetry for children; professional books for teachers
- 1960–63 Pharmacologist: Mead Johnson, Evansville, Indiana
- 1963–73 Editor/Editorial Manager: Hallmark Cards, Kansas City, Missouri
- 1973–2008 Business owner: Glenstone Block Company, Glen Block Hardware stores; Springfield, Branson, Branson West, Camdenton, Kaiser, Missouri
- 1984–2018 Co-owner: Gamble's Gifts, Springfield, Missouri

== Bibliography ==
Poetry

- 1993 Somebody Catch My Homework
- 2003 The Mouse Was Out at Recess
- 2004 Connecting Dots, Poems of My Journey
- 2007 Bugs, poems about creeping things
- 2008 Pirates
- 2009 Vacation, We're Going to the Ocean!
- 2012 Cowboys
- 2016 Now You See Them, Now You Don't
- 2018 Crawly School for Bugs
- 2018 A Place to Start a Family
- 2020 After Dark
- 2024 Wild Brunch (in process)

Fiction

- 1969 The Boy with A Drum
- 1969 Little Turtle's Big Adventure
- 1972 The Book of Giant Stories
- 1986 Wake Up, Sun!
- 1994 When Cows Come Home
- 2001 Johnny Appleseed, My Story
- 2002 Dylan the Eagle-Hearted Chicken
- 2013 A Perfect Home for a Family
- 2020 Rum Pum Pum

Nonfiction

- 1970 The World of American Caves
- 1981 What Do You Know!
- 2001 Caves, Mysteries Beneath Our Feet
- 2002 Volcanoes, Nature's Incredible Fireworks
- 2007 Cave Detectives, Unraveling the Mysteries of an Ice Age Cave
- 2010 Mammoth Bones and Broken Stones
- 2020 And the Bullfrogs Sang

Professional

- 1999 Easy Poetry Lessons that Dazzle and Delight (with Bernice Cullinan)
- 2009 Partner Poems for Building Fluency (with Tim Rasinski and Gay Fawcett)
- 2013 Learning through Poetry (in 5 volumes) (with Mary Jo Fresch)
- 2017 7 Keys to Research for Writing Success (with Mary Jo Fresch)
- 2020 Guided Practice for Reading Growth (with Laura Robb)
- 2020 Empowering Student's Knowledge of Vocabulary (with Mary Jo Fresch)
- 2022 Partner Poems & Word Ladders for Building Foundational Literacy Skills, K-2

(with Timothy V. Rasinski and Mary Jo Fresch)

- 2022 Partner Poems & Word Ladders for Building Foundational Literacy Skills, 1–3

(with Timothy V. Rasinski and Mary Jo Fresch)

- 2023 Promote Reading Gains with Differentiated Instruction, Grades 3-5 (Laura Robb

and Tim Rasinski)

- 2024 Teaching the Fluency Development Lesson, Grades 1-5 (with Lynne Kulich and

Tim Rasinski) (in process)

== Personal life ==
Harrison and his wife Sandy live in Springfield, Missouri. They have two grown children, Robin (husband Tim and children Kris and Tyler) and Jeff.

== Honors and awards ==
- Christopher Award, Christopher Foundation, 1973, for The Book of Giant Stories.
- Award for Outstanding Contributions to Children's Literature, Central State University, 1978.
- Kentucky Blue Grass Award nominee, Kentucky State Reading Association, 1993, for Somebody Catch My Homework, 2022.
- Celebrate Literacy Award, Springfield Council of the International Reading Association (IRA), 1994, 2002.
- Celebrate Literacy Award, Missouri State Reading Association, 1994, 2023.
- Friend of Education Award, Missouri State Teachers Association, 1994 and 2002.
- Children's Choice Award, IRA/Children's Book Council, 1994, for Somebody Catch My Homework, 1995, for When Cows Come Home, and 1997, for A Thousand Cousins.
- Inclusion on Recommended Reading List, Kansas State Reading Association, 1995, and Master List of Virginia Young Readers Program, Virginia State Reading Association, 1996–97, both for When Cows Come Home.
- IRA Local Council Community Service Award, 2001, for "Sky High on Reading" literacy project.
- Missouri Governor's Humanities Award, 2001.
- The Missourian Award, 2006.
- Pioneer in Education Award for distinguished and devoted service to public education,

2014.

- First recipient of Laura Ingalls Wilder Award for Children's Literature, 2020.
