= Vermont Golden Dome Book Award =

Literary award

The Vermont Golden Dome Book Award (formerly the Dorothy Canfield Fisher Children's Book Award) annually recognizes one new American children's book selected by the vote of Vermont schoolchildren. It was inaugurated in 1957.

The award is co-sponsored by the Vermont State PTA and the Vermont Department of Libraries and was originally named after the Vermont writer Dorothy Canfield Fisher. In 2020, it was temporarily renamed the "VT Middle-Grade Book Award" before schoolchildren voted to officially call it the "Vermont Golden Dome Book Award".

== Selection process and award ==
Each spring a committee of eight adults selects a "Master List" of thirty books first published during the previous calendar year. The list is announced at the annual Dorothy Canfield Fisher Conference, usually in May, and is available at Vermont school and public libraries for children who wish to participate over the next eleven months. The following spring, those children who have read at least five of the thirty books are eligible to vote for the award, with a deadline in mid-April. The award ceremony is scheduled after the end of the school year, usually late June. Thus the award is always for books published two years previously.

The winning writer is invited to visit Vermont to speak with children about the experience of writing for children.

== Awards in other categories ==
Vermont sponsors two other statewide book awards determined by the votes of younger and older students.

The Red Clover Book Award recognizes a picture book published two years earlier. Voters are children in grades K–4 who have read, or heard read aloud, all 10 books on the list. The Red Clover BA was established by 1997–98, if not earlier, and its 2014 winner was announced by May. It is the centerpiece of a one-day conference in October.

The Green Mountain Book Award is voted by high school students (grades 9–12, routinely ages 14–18) either through a school library or individually online, deadline May 31. Students are asked to vote only once and to read at least 3 from a list of 15 books (for 2014, published 2008–2012; for 2015, published 2011–2013). The Green Mountain BA was inaugurated in 2006.

== Winners ==
One book by a single writer has won the Vermont Golden Dome Book Award every year since 1957.

Award winners
Year	Author	Title	Ref.
1957	Mildred Pace	Old Bones, the Wonder Horse	
1958	Beverly Cleary	Fifteen	
1959	Margaret Carver Leighton	Comanche of the Seventh	
1960	Phoebe Erickson	Double or Nothing	
1961	Thelma Bell	Captain Ghost	
1962	Evelyn Sibley Lampman	City under the Back Steps	
1963	Sheila Burnford	The Incredible Journey	
1964	Zachary Ball	Bristle Face	
1965	Sterling North	Rascal	
1966	Beverly Cleary	Ribsy	
1967	Phillip Viereck	The Summer I Was Lost	
1968	Jacqueline Jackson	The Taste of Spruce Gum	
1969	M. W. Thompson	Two in the Wilderness	
1970	Walt Morey	Kävik the Wolf Dog	
1971	Betty K. Erwin	Go to the Room of the Eyes	
1972	Melvin Ellis	Flight of the White Wolf	
1973	Donald E. Caufield	Never Steal a Magic Cat	
1974	George Woods	Catch a Killer	
1975	Betsy Byars	The Eighteenth Emergency	
1976	Jean Merrill	The Toothpaste Millionaire	
1977	Stella Pevsner	A Smart Kid Like You	
1978	Lois Duncan	Summer of Fear	
1979	Susan Beth Pfeffer	Kid Power	
1980	David Budbill	Bones on Black Spruce Mountain	
1981	James Howe	Bunnicula	
1982	Francine Pascal	The Hand-Me-Down Kid	
1983	Judy Blume	Tiger Eyes	
1984	Pat Rhoades Mauser	A Bundle of Sticks	
1985	Beverly Cleary	Dear Mr. Henshaw	‡
1986	Robert Kimmel Smith	The War With Grandpa	
1987	Elizabeth Winthrop	The Castle in the Attic	
1988	Mary Downing Hahn	Wait Till Helen Comes	
1989	Gary Paulsen	Hatchet	
1990	Amy Ehrlich	Where It Stops, Nobody Knows	
1991	Lois Lowry	Number the Stars	‡
1992	Jerry Spinelli	Maniac Magee	‡
1993	Phyllis Reynolds Naylor	Shiloh	‡
1994	Bruce Coville	Jennifer Murdley's Toad	
1995	Susan Cooper	The Boggart	
1996	Mary Downing Hahn	Time for Andrew	
1997	Barbara Park	Mick Harte Was Here	
1998	Peg Kehret	Small Steps: The Year I Got Polio	
1999	Gail Carson Levine	Ella Enchanted	
2000	Louis Sachar	Holes	‡
2001	Christopher Paul Curtis	Bud, Not Buddy	‡
2002	Kate DiCamillo	Because of Winn-Dixie	
2003	Sharon Creech	Love That Dog	
2004	Jerry Spinelli	Loser	
2005	Kate DiCamillo	The Tale of Despereaux	‡
2006	Mary Downing Hahn	The Old Willis Place	
2007	Carl Hiaasen	Flush	
2008	Jeff Kinney	Diary of a Wimpy Kid	
2009	Cynthia Lord	Rules	
2010	Suzanne Collins	The Hunger Games	
2011	Wendy Mass	11 Birthdays	
2012	Raina Telgemeier	Smile	
2013	Wendelin Van Draanen	The Running Dream	
2014	R. J. Palacio	Wonder	
2015	Chris Grabenstein	Escape from Mr. Lemoncello's Library	
2016	Cece Bell	El Deafo	
2017	Jory John and Mac Barnett	The Terrible Two	
2018	Alan Gratz	Projekt 1065	
2019	Alan Gratz	Refugee	
2020	Katherine Arden	Small Spaces	
2021	Stuart Gibbs	Charlie Thorne and the Last Equation	
2022	Stacy McAnulty	Millionaires for the Month	
2023	Megan E. Freeman	Alone	
2024	Katherine Applegate	Odder	
2025	Kate O'Shaughnessy	Lasagna Means I Love You	
2026	Katherine Rundell	Impossible Creatures	

== Multiple awards ==
Several writers have won more than one DCF Award: Beverly Cleary in 1958, 1966, and 1985; Mary Downing Hahn in 1988, 1996, and 2006; Jerry Spinelli and Kate DiCamillo and Alan Gratz twice each.

Seven times from 1985 to 2005 (‡), and no others, the schoolchildren selected the winner of the annual Newbery Medal (dated one year earlier, established 1922). That award by the Association for Library Service to Children recognizes the year's "most distinguished contribution to American literature for children". The first agreement of Vermont children with U.S. children's librarians was their 1985 selection of Dear Mr. Henshaw by Cleary and there were six more such agreements during the next twenty years to 2005.

== Controversy and renaming ==
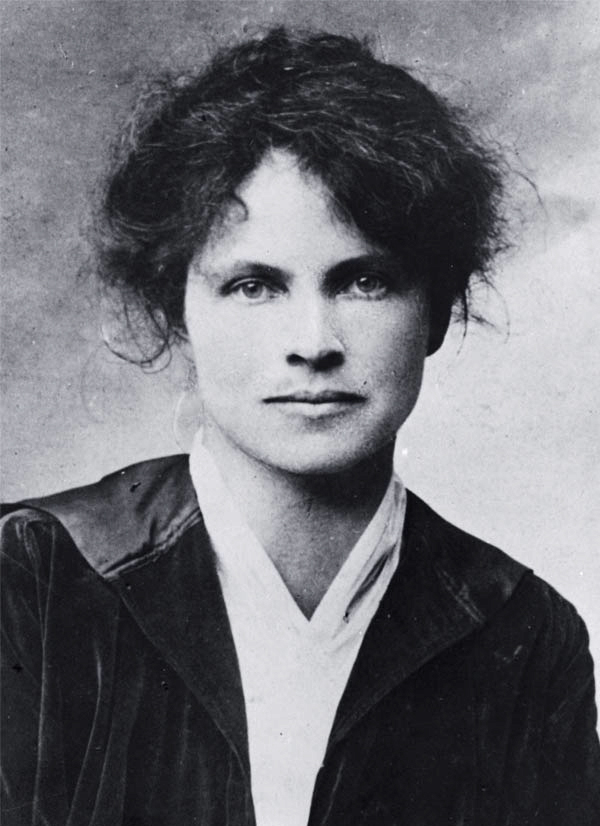
Dorothy Canfield Fisher

In 2018, there was a call from the Vermont Library Board to change the name of the award to no longer honor Dorothy Canfield Fisher, following a report that she had ties to Vermont's eugenics movement. In April 2019, the Vermont Department of Libraries announced that the award would be renamed in 2020. It was temporarily renamed the "VT Middle-Grade Book Award". In November 2020, it was officially renamed the "Vermont Golden Dome Book Award" after a vote by Vermont elementary school students.
