= Mark Twain Readers Award =

Annual award for children's books

The Mark Twain Readers Award, or simply Mark Twain Award, is a children's book award that annually recognizes one book selected by the vote of Missouri schoolchildren from a list prepared by librarians and volunteer readers. It is now one of four Missouri Association of School Librarians (MASL) Readers Awards and is associated with school grades 4 to 6; the other MASL Readers Awards were inaugurated from 1995 to 2009 and are associated with grades K–3, 6–8, 9–12 and nonfiction. The 1970 Newbery Medal winning book Sounder, by William H. Armstrong, was the inaugural winner of the Mark Twain Award in 1972.

Peg Kehret has won the Mark Twain Award four times, once in 1999 for Small Steps: The Year I Got Polio, a memoir of her childhood, and three times in six years from 2007 to 2012 for novels.

== Nomination guidelines ==
- Books should interest children in grades four through six.
- Books should be an original work written by an author living in the United States.
- Books should be of literary value which may enrich children's personal lives.
- Books should be published two years prior to nomination on a master list of twelve nominees.

== Voting process ==
Though the list of nominated books is designated for grades four through six, any student can vote for the winner so long as they satisfy the following criteria:

- Book must have been read by voter.
- Voter must have read at least four books from the list of nominees.
- Voter can only vote once.

Schools design their own ballots. Individual votes for each school (or qualified group) are tallied on a single sheet and submitted to the MASL./red

== Winners ==
The award has recognized a single book by a single writer without exception from 1972.

- 2025 The Girl in the Lake by India Hill Brown
- 2024 Six Feet Below Zero by Ena Jones
- 2023 Millionaires for the Month by Stacy McAnulty
- 2022 White Bird: A Wonder Story by R.J. Palacio
- 2021 Blended by Sharon Draper
- 2020 One for Sorrow: a Ghost Story by Mary Downing Hahn
- 2019 Framed! by James Ponti
- 2018 The War That Saved My Life by Kimberly Brubaker Bradley
- 2017 A Million Ways Home by Dianna Dorisi-Winget
- 2016 Escape from Mr. Lemoncello's Library by Chris Grabenstein
- 2015 Wonder by R.J. Palacio
- 2014 The Unwanteds by Lisa McMann
- 2013 Out of My Mind by Sharon Draper
- 2012 Runaway Twin by Peg Kehret
- 2011 Stolen Children by Peg Kehret
- 2010 Deep and Dark and Dangerous by Mary Downing Hahn
- 2009 The Sea of Monsters by Rick Riordan
- 2008 The Lightning Thief by Rick Riordan
- 2007 Abduction! by Peg Kehret
- 2006 The City of Ember by Jeanne DuPrau
- 2005 Wenny Has Wings by Janet Lee Carey (made into a Japanese movie Ano sora wo Oboetaru)
- 2004 Zach's Lie by Roland Smith
- 2003 Because of Winn-Dixie by Kate DiCamillo
- 2002 Dork In Disguise by Carol Gorman
- 2001 Holes by Louis Sachar
- 2000 Saving Shiloh by Phyllis Naylor
- 1999 Small Steps: The Year I Got Polio by Peg Kehret
- 1998 Titanic Crossing by Barbara Williams
- 1997 Time for Andrew by Mary Downing Hahn
- 1996 Ghosts of Mercy Manor by Betty Ren Wright
- 1995 The Man Who Loved Clowns by June Rae Wood
- 1994 Shiloh by Phyllis Naylor
- 1993 Maniac Magee by Jerry Spinelli
- 1992 The Doll in the Garden: A Ghost Story by Mary Downing Hahn
- 1991 All About Sam by Lois Lowry
- 1990 There's a Boy in the Girls' Bathroom by Louis Sachar
- 1989 Sixth-Grade Sleepover by Eve Bunting
- 1988 Baby-Sitting Is a Dangerous Job by Willo Davis Roberts
- 1987 The War with Grandpa by Robert Kimmel Smith
- 1986 The Dollhouse Murders by Betty Ren Wright
- 1985 A Bundle of Sticks by Pat Rhoads Mauser
- 1984 The Secret Life of the Underwear Champ by Betty Miles
- 1983 The Girl with the Silver Eyes by Willo Davis Roberts
- 1982 The Boy Who Saw Bigfoot by Marian Place
- 1981 Soup for President by Robert Newton Peck
- 1980 The Pinballs by Betsy Byars
- 1979 The Champion of Merrimack County by Roger Wolcott Drury
- 1978 Ramona the Brave by Beverly Cleary
- 1977 The Ghost of Saturday Night by Sid Fleischman
- 1976 The Home Run Trick by Scott Corbett
- 1975 How to Eat Fried Worms by Thomas Rockwell
- 1974 It's a Mile from Here to Glory by Robert C. Lee
- 1973 Mrs. Frisby and the Rats of NIMH by Robert C. O'Brien
- 1972 Sounder by William H. Armstrong

== See also ==
- 1971–1972 Mark Twain Awards nominees
- 1972–1973 Mark Twain Awards nominees
