= Deep and Dark and Dangerous =

2007 children's novel by Mary Downing Hahn

- First edition
- Author: Mary Downing Hahn
- Cover artist: Greg Spalenka
- Language: English
- Genre: Mystery, Horror
- Published: 2007, Clarion Books
- Publication place: United States
- Media type: Print, ebook, audiobook
- Pages: 187 pages
- ISBN: 0618665455

Deep and Dark and Dangerous is a 2007 children's mystery horror novel written by Mary Downing Hahn. It was first published on May 21, 2007 through Clarion Books and follows a young girl who tries to investigate a torn photograph but gets wrapped up in a larger mystery.

== Summary ==
Thirteen-year-old Ali O'Dywer is thrilled at the prospect of spending the summer at a lakehouse in Maine as babysitter for her aunt Dulcie's adorable daughter Emma, rather than staying home with her own moody, sickly mother Claire. Dulcie and Claire have been estranged since they were teens after a family rift both women refuse to disclose. Prior to leaving for the summer, Ali discovers a photo of her aunt and mother as young girls at the lakehouse; a third girl, labeled only T, has been torn from the photo. Claire claims not to remember who the third girl was.

At the lake, Emma befriends an insolent young girl named Sissy. Both Ali and Dulcie are concerned when Emma begins to act more and more like her new "friend" by throwing tantrums, sneaking off without supervision, and being unusually stubborn and disobedient. Sissy becomes ever more intrusive and vicious, barging into the cottage uninvited and terrifying Emma with ghost stories about a girl named Teresa who drowned in the lake years before. Ali finds more and more evidence that Teresa might have been the mysterious T who was torn from the photograph, but Dulcie denies it.

After Sissy nearly drowns Emma while the two are swimming, Ali realizes that Sissy is not merely a bad influence, but dangerous. Dulcie, who has yet to meet Sissy face to face, agrees that Sissy should not be allowed near Emma. The next time Sissy appears, Ali forbids her from seeing Emma again, but Sissy is able to lure Emma away by promising her a doll she particularly covets. Dulcie is shocked to recognize the doll, which is mildewed and rotten from being at the bottom of the lake.

Finally Dulcie confesses the truth: Teresa was a bratty little girl who used to bully Ali's mother Claire when they visited the lake as children. Dulcie, who resented Claire for being scared of everything, including the lake, used to side with Teresa against Claire. One day Teresa stole Claire's doll and climbed into a small boat, threatening to throw the doll overboard if Claire did not join her. Teresa and Dulcie tossed the doll over Claire's head until she became hysterical. Dulcie, fed up with both Teresa and Claire, threw the doll into the lake. To her shock, Teresa jumped into the water to save the doll and never emerged. Frightened that they would be blamed for Teresa's death, Dulcie and Claire agreed to keep silent about it. Teresa's body was never recovered and the family never returned to the cottage. The terrible secret eventually caused a rift between the two sisters. Dulcie shows Ali a whole copy of the torn photograph; Ali recognizes the third girl as Sissy.

Sissy reappears and admits that she is Teresa, forever bound to the lake since her body was never found. Sissy demands that Dulcie be punished for "murdering" her; if she is not, Sissy will go on haunting the lake and tormenting the family. Dulcie confesses first to a lawyer and then to the town police, only to be told by both that Sissy's death was accidental and that Dulcie would not have been held responsible even if she had confessed immediately. Unsatisfied with this outcome, Sissy demands that Dulcie confess to the entire town. Dulcie goes to the town newspaper, which agrees to print the story. Meanwhile, Sissy secretly tells Emma and Ali where to find her body. When the newspaper comes to take photographs for the article, Emma says what Sissy told her, and the resulting story revives enough interest in the case that the state police send divers to search the lake. Sissy's remains are found exactly where Emma and Ali said they would be. The unusual story becomes national news, and Sissy is at last satisfied that Dulcie's secret has been exposed. Sissy's living relatives learn of her discovery and makes arrangements to bury her.

Ali meets Sissy one last time to tell her about the upcoming funeral. Now much less rude and more regretful of the life she never got to live, Sissy tells Ali that once the funeral is over, she will leave the lake forever. Dulcie and Claire attend the funeral, which gives them the closure they need to let go of their resentments toward each other and reconnect. While bringing flowers to Sissy's grave with Ali, Emma finds the doll she was promised, now fully restored and beautiful, and takes it home.

== Reception ==
Critical reception was mostly positive. Kirkus Reviews gave the book a positive review and stated that the book had a "satisfyingly chilly but calm resolution". Kliatt also gave Deep and Dark and Dangerous a positive rating, commenting that the book's foreshadowing "is a bit heavy-handed" but overall writing that it "provides just the right amount of shiver for this age group without scarring them for life." The Bulletin of the Center for Children's Books remarked that while the book did not live up to some of Hahn's previous works such as Wait Till Helen Comes, it had "a compact and approachable shiveriness that would make it an easygoing vacation read."

== Awards ==
- Edgar Award for Young Adult (2008)
- Maud Hart Lovelace book award (2011, won)

Awards
Preceded by The Sea of Monsters	Mark Twain Award; 2010	Succeeded by Stolen Children
