= Treasure Hunters (book series) =

Young adult children's series by James Patterson

- Logo for Treasure Hunters
- Treasure Hunters (2013); Treasure Hunters: Danger Down the Nile (2014); Treasure Hunters: Secret of the Forbidden City (2015); Treasure Hunters: Peril at the Top of the World (2016); Treasure Hunters: Quest for the City of Gold (2018); Treasure Hunters: All-American Adventure (2019); Treasure Hunters: The Plunder Down Under (2020); Treasure Hunters: The Ultimate Quest (2022); Treasure Hunters: The Greatest Treasure Hunt (2023)
- Author: James Patterson, Chris Grabenstein, Mark Shulman
- Cover artist: Juliana Neufeld
- Country: United States
- Language: English
- Genre: adventure and children's fiction
- Publisher: Little, Brown and Company
- Published: 2013-2023
- Media type: Print (hardcover and paperback), audiobook, e-book
- No. of books: 9
- Website: http://www.treasurehuntersbooks.com

Treasure Hunters is a series of young adult and adventure fiction books written by American author James Patterson with Chris Grabenstein and Mark Shulman. The series has been sold in more than 35 countries, with generally positive and few mixed reviews from critics.

The story revolves around the Kidd siblings: Bick, Beck, Storm and Tommy, who try to find their missing parents who have disappeared. Their father, the legendary treasure hunter Thomas Kidd, went missing during a storm and their mother was kidnapped in Cyprus by pirates three months earlier. The series shows them trying to continue their family occupation―treasure hunting, while fulfilling the demands of the pirates who have kidnapped their mother.

The Kidd family in the series is named after William Kidd, the pirate.
