= Wait Till Helen Comes (film) =

- Directed by: Dominic James
- Written by: Victoria Sanchez Mandryk
- Based on: Wait Till Helen Comes by Mary Downing Hahn
- Produced by: André Rouleau; Don Carmody; Victoria Sanchez Mandryk
- Starring: Maria Bello; Sophie Nélisse; Isabelle Nélisse
- Cinematography: Rene Ohashi
- Edited by: Yvann Thibaudeau
- Music by: Samuel LaFlamme
- Release dates: 7 September 2016 (Lisbon International Horror Film Festival); 25 November 2016 (Canada)
- Country: Canada
- Language: English

Wait Till Helen Comes (also known as Little Girl's Secret) is a 2016 Canadian film directed by Dominic James and written by Victoria Sanchez Mandryk. It is adapted from the book by Mary Downing Hahn. It stars Maria Bello with biological sisters Sophie Nélisse and Isabelle Nélisse, who play stepsisters in the film. The film was released in multiple Canadian cities on 25 November 2016.

== Plot ==
Set in 1982, Molly is a teenage girl living in Baltimore with her widowed mother Jean, and younger brother, Michael. When Jean marries Dave, a writer and widower, the new family moves to an isolated rural church, converted into a house, outside the small town of Holwell. On the way, they stop at a psychiatric hospital to pick up Dave’s preadolescent daughter, Heather, who has lived there for three years, suffering the trauma of seeing her mother die in a house fire.

While exploring, Heather is attracted by a blue butterfly, following it deeper into the woods. Later, when exploring the graveyard adjoining the churchyard; cared for by kindly old Mr. Simmons; they find a memorial plaque (not a grave) for a six-year-old girl with the initials H.E.H., the same initials as Heather. Molly and Michael follow up with Mrs. Williams, the local librarian, who finds records and photos explaining that the plaque commemorates Helen Harper, who died with her parents in a fire in 1886, none of whose remains were found.

Heather makes friends with the ghost of Helen. Helen leads her to the ruins of her former house beside a river, and the two play there regularly. Besides Heather, Molly is the only one who can see Helen—a gift that Molly shares with her dead father, who had been considered mentally unstable for his visions. When Molly tries to tell the rest of the family about Helen, they think she's crazy. Only Mr. Simmons believes her, as his departed wife Rose shared the same gift when she was alive. He also warns Molly to be careful, as a number of young girls have gone missing over the years after befriending Helen’s ghost (a girl is seen walking into the river during the opening credits).

Molly, trying to foster a relationship with Heather, keeps an eye on her to make sure she stays safe. When Heather runs away to Helen's house, Molly’s father appears to her in a dream to warn her. Molly wakes and runs after Heather to make sure nothing happens. When she gets there, she sees a vision of how Helen accidentally closed a trap door, which she wasn't able to unlock when her parents were in the basement. She inadvertently knocked a candle over but stayed too long in the ensuing fire as she attempted to open the trap door. The locked basement eventually killed her parents, and a burning Helen ran into the river, where she drowned. Heather tries to join Helen in the river and starts to drown. Molly runs in to save her, bringing the unconscious Heather to shore and resuscitating her. Heather reveals that she accidentally killed her mother when trying to cook for her, starting a house fire. She believes that she and Helen, whose story is similar, truly understand each other.

Molly finds the trap door to the basement in the ruins and, with Helen's help, gets it open. Inside, they find the corpses of Helen's parents, whose spirits had been trapped. A blue butterfly, the nickname that Helen's parents called her by, lands on the corpses. Michael arrives in time to join Molly and Heather as they all watch the spirits of Helen's parents, finally freed, depart to the heavens with Helen.

== Cast ==
- Sophie Nélisse as Molly
- Isabelle Nélisse as Heather
- Liam Dickinson as Michael
- Maria Bello as Jean
- Callum Keith Rennie as Dave
- Cassandra Tusa as Teenage Girl
- Frank Adamson as Mr. Simmons
- Mary Downing Hahn as Mrs. Williams
- Abigail Pniowsky as Helen (Harper/Miller)
  - Alexia Alderson as Helen’s voice
- John B. Lowe as Sheriff
- Emily Parker as Mrs. Miller (Mrs. Harper, remarried)

== Production ==
The film was produced by Caramel Film Productions in association with Mednick Productions, with producers Victoria Sanchez Mandryk, Don Carmody, Valérie d'Auteuil, Ian Dimerman, and Brendon Sawatzky. Executive producers are Scott Mednick, Manuel Freedman, Skyler Mednick, Dominique Desrochers, and Alexandre Grenier.

On September 12, 2014, Variety announced that financing and cast were in place and principal photography would commence on the production of a film adaptation of Wait Till Helen Comes. The work would be directed by Dominic James, and would star Maria Bello and the Nélisse sisters. Production was slated to begin later that same month.

Principal photography began on the 28th September 2014 in Winnipeg, Manitoba. Author Mary Downing Hahn appears in the film in a speaking role, after having revealed to screenwriter Mandryk that as a little girl she had always wanted to be an actress in movies. Wait Till Helen Comes is the first of her books to be adapted into a feature film.
