= Treasure Hunters (novel) =

2013 children's novel

- Treasure Hunters cover
- Author: James Patterson, Chris Grabenstein, Mark Shulman
- Cover artist: Juliana Neufeld
- Series: Treasure Hunters
- Genre: Adventure, children's novel
- Published: 2013
- Publisher: Little, Brown and Company
- Publication place: United States
- Media type: Print (hardcover and paperback), audiobook, e-book
- Pages: 480 (hardcover)
- ISBN: 0316207578
- OCLC: 818293141
- LC Class: PZ7.P27653 Tre 2013
- Followed by: Treasure Hunters: Danger Down the Nile

Treasure Hunters is a children's adventure novel written by James Patterson with Chris Grabenstein and Mark Shulman. It is the first book in the Treasure Hunters series. It was published in 2013.

The book chronicles the life of the Kidd siblings, who find themselves in the biggest treasure hunt of their lives after their parents disappear. The story shows them working together to defeat pirates and escape from treasure-hunting rivals while following clues to find out what really happened to their parents and if they are still alive.

== Plot summary ==
The Kidd siblings Storm (Stephanie), Tommy (Thomas), Bick (Bickford), and Beck (Rebecca), live a happy life on their ship until their father, Thomas Kidd goes missing during a storm. Their mother also went missing three months earlier in Cyprus. The Kidd's hold a small funeral for their father who is presumed to be dead. They continue to hunt for treasure, which is their family business. The Kidds start their treasure hunt in the Cayman Islands, which was their treasure hunt destination before the storm. The four of them go into the secret compartment in their ship, The Lost, known as the Room, where they find a list of the top ten greatest treasures of the world.

A speedboat follows the Kidds. They are taken to Louie Louie, referred to as the Big Man, a person who previously had done many deals with their father. He says that he needs an item their father promised to give him in exchange for a bee amulet and repairing The Lost for the Kidds. Tommy takes a girl named Daphne on a tour of the ship. Bick and Beck search her and find out that she was trying to steal a mwana pwo African mask. Louie Louie takes the mwana pwo mask, the item he desired and gives the Kidds the bee amulet. They find a map in the bee amulet titled Cordoba's Lost Fleet, which was a vessel that carried gold and silver bars that went missing after a hurricane. The map is later revealed to be a fake kept by the treasure hunter Nathan Collier, who was the number one nemesis of their parents. He informs the Police about their whereabouts who are about to take them to the orphanage but Storm's knowledge of the United Nations Convention on the Law of the Sea saves them. Later in the book, it is revealed that Solomon's knowledge would help them find where their father is.

Tommy reveals that their father had discovered two of Cordoba's lost fleet shortly after Bick and Beck's birth and was instructed to reveal the treasure only when the Kidds were in a financial crisis. They take most of the treasure from the fleet, leaving some behind. Using Louie Louie's contacts they are able to sell the treasure to his associate in Miami. Timothy, their father's overseer, arrives at their ship and announces that he is living with them. Soon afterward, The Lost is followed by speedboats with pirates. They ask the Kidds for the key to the Room but they lie they don't have a key. The pirates then kidnap Beck as a backup. They use a lie-detecting device on her but she manages to outsmart the pirates and steals a bottle of Pentothal from them. They give her back to Timothy.

The Kidds, who have grown suspicious of Timothy, use the Pentothal on him after he goes to sleep. He reveals that he is a CIA agent and their parents were also spy agents who worked under him. The Kidds trust him and allow him to go to do his duty. Soon afterward, the pirates, who had used a long-range hearing device to spy on their conversations, come back. They are however tricked into jumping off the ship. Nathan Collier arrives suddenly by tracking Tommy's satellite phone. He takes the key from the Kidds and checks the room but doesn't find anything. The Kidds then travel to Portia Macy Hudson, an antique collector and trades the Bee amulet for a Grecian Urn. Daphne arrives at the spot and reveals herself as Portia's daughter, who tried to take the mwana pwo mask directly to Louie to trade for the bee amulet. The Kidds track Dr. Lewis who is actually Louie's brother. He says that the Grecian Urn is the one mentioned by the English poet John Keats in the poem,"Ode on a Grecian Urn".

Dr. Lewis reveals the true story behind their mother's kidnapping. Aramis, commonly known as the pirate king, sends their mother to verify whether the Grecian urn with the pirates was an original. It was a fake and the pirates, furious for their deal being broken, kidnaps their mother for saying the truth. The Kidds try to take the Urn to the pirates to free their mother but it is stolen from the Kidds by a group of girls working for Nathan Collier. The Kidds, having no choice, go to Aramis as they have the provenance papers for proving the urn as an original. The Kidds, once close to the urn, take it and run. Suddenly, CIA agents under Uncle Timothy's leadership arrive and arrests Aramis. However, he only can save their mother from being killed by the pirates by making a deal with them. He makes the call to not kill their mother and is set free but his possessions are taken. Later on, the Kidds receive an email from their father and rejoice. Later on, the narrator, Bick, reveals it was him who sent the e-mail to make the family happy by making them think their father is alive and tells the readers not to tell anyone.

== Reception ==
The book was a bestseller, with most sales happening between September 30 and October 6, 2013.

Both Kirkus Reviews and Booklist gave Treasure Hunters starred reviews with Kirk us Reviews writing, "This new series promises it all: ruthless pirates, CIA spies, terrorists, stolen works of art and priceless treasure. More important, it delivers a high-seas adventure that will entice even the most confirmed of landlubbers." and Booklist writing, "From kidnapping to underwater speargun fights, action is the name of the game here, bolstered by bits of comedy. Although the premise and plot are wholly unconvincing, the fast-paced, first-person narrative is entertaining. With 10 treasures (not to mention two parents) waiting to be discovered, it looks like a new series is on the horizon."

The New York Times gave it mixed reviews, writing, "There isn't a lot of emotional heft, jazzy writing or deep characterization here, and the broad humour often falls flat."

The series was also reviewed by Common Sense Media and Publishers Weekly.
