= Closed for the Season =

Closed for the Season may refer to:

- Closed for the Season (film), a 2010 supernatural thriller film
- Closed for the Season (novel), a 2009 novel by Mary Downing Hahn
- "Closed for the Season", a song by the Hives from the album Barely Legal
