= Tilt-A-Whirl (disambiguation) =

Tilt-A-Whirl is an amusement park ride.

Tilt-A-Whirl may also refer to:

- Arcwelder, a band originally named Tilt-A-Whirl
- Tilt-a-Whirl (novel), a book by Chris Grabenstein
- Tilt-a-whirl, a professional wrestling hold
  - Tilt-a-whirl backbreaker
  - Tilt-a-whirl headscissors takedown

== See also ==
- Tilt O'Whirl, a 1999 music album by Veal
