= Isabelle Nélisse =

Canadian child actress (born 2003)

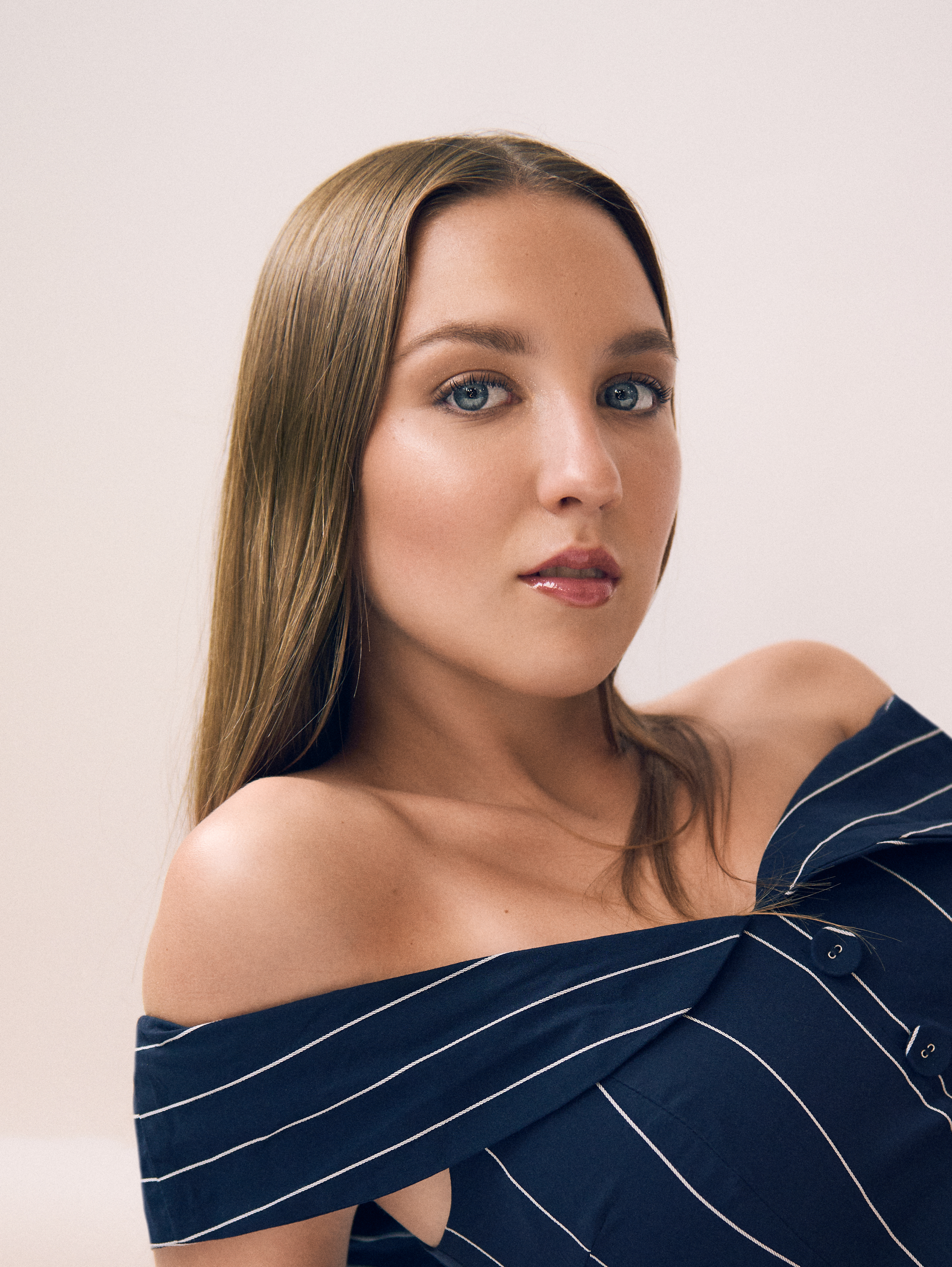
- Portrait (2022)
- Born: December 3, 2003 (age 22); Windsor, Ontario, Canada
- Occupation: Actress
- Years active: 2013–2022
- Relatives: Sophie Nélisse (sister)

Isabelle Nélisse (born December 3, 2003) is a Canadian former child actress. She started her career at age seven, in a recurring role as the daughter of a main character in Mirador. She may be best known from her film debut, at age nine, in the 2013 horror film Mama. Her last credited role, her first as an adult, was a recurring appearance in the 2022 miniseries Lac-Noir. She is the younger sister of actress Sophie Nélisse.

== Filmography ==
=== Film ===
- Mama (2013) as Lilly
- Whitewash (2013) as child at cottage
- Mommy (2014) as Kyla's daughter
- Wait Till Helen Comes (2016) as Heather
- Worst Case, We Get Married (2017) as young Aïcha
- It (2017) as girl in the bathroom
- The Tale (2018) as Jenny (age 13)
- The Far Shore (2018) as Mélanie

=== Television ===
- Mirador (2011, 2016) as Daniel's daughter Chloe, recurring role
- The Strain (2014) as Emma Arnot, 3 episodes
- Lac-Noir (2022) as Laurie, recurring role (miniseries)
