= Mister Death's Blue-Eyed Girls =

2012 novel by Mary Downing Hahn

- first edition
- Author: Mary Downing Hahn
- Language: English
- Genre: coming-of-age historical fiction
- Publisher: Clarion Books
- Publication date: 2012
- Publication place: United States
- ISBN: 9780547760629 (hardcover edition)

Mister Death's Blue-Eyed Girls is a 2012 American coming-of-age young adult historical fiction novel written by Mary Downing Hahn. In large part based on Hahn's own experiences with a real-life murder case from suburban Baltimore in 1955, the book is fictional, and follows protagonist Nora Cunningham, a high school junior mature beyond her years who is troubled by the implications of a horrific double-murder that occurs in her neighbourhood in the 1950s. The book received largely positive reviews for the candid exploration of issues like death, crime, love, sexuality and friendship.

== Plot ==
Nora Cunningham is a rather homely, taller-than-average 16-year-old girl in the fictional suburb of Elmgrove, Maryland in the 1950s. Her main concerns surround friendship, her plans post-high school, and her hope of finding a boyfriend taller than she is who will love her for her personality. All of this changes when Nora and her friends are on an outing (a party in the park), and discover that the corpses of two girls, not much younger than they are, have been found shot and killed by an unknown murderer. The neighbours and police are quick to blame Buddy Novak, the local bad boy and teen rebel, although Nora has a gut feeling that Buddy is innocent. This is conveyed to readers with brief snippets of the point-of-view of the murderer himself, who is an unnamed pervert and psychopath never revealed as guilty to the characters. Unidentified, he remains a background force in the book, while Nora finds herself slipping away from her friends, who gradually grow bored of the murders and can't understand why Nora is so fixated on them. Nora questions her Catholic faith and cannot fathom why God would let such a murder happen. She has vivid fantasies and dreams in which she escapes into a frozen bubble of 1950s nostalgia, complete with neon, diners and soda fountains. Here, she can still see the murdered girls. Nora also begins falling in love with Buddy, who plans to leave Elmgrove. The book ends ambiguously, with the killer able to remain unidentified but also not at large, and Nora growing to accept that she alone cannot fix the murders, or be responsible for them herself.

== Background ==
Mister Death's Blue-Eyed Girls is based on a 1950s double-homicide case in suburban Baltimore, which had deeply bothered Downing Hahn when she was growing up. The case featured the shootings of two young girls, and was never solved. The book's title comes from a line in the poem "Buffalo Bill's" by E.E. Cummings, which goes, "and what i want to know is... how do you like your blue-eyed boy... Mister Death". Downing Hahn has her unnamed murderer character re-imagine the poem to apply to girls with blue eyes that he is fascinated by.

== Reception ==
Mister Death's Blue-Eyed Girls was met with largely positive critical reception. Publishers Weekly said of the book, "this wrenching novel offers an aggregate portrait of the effects of loss and grief, including both the strengthening and dissolution of relationships." Kirkus Reviews called the book "an engrossing exploration of how a murder affects a community" and praised the book for portraying different perspectives, using diary entries and inner monologues and other literary devices to build up the characters. Good Books & Good Wine said of the book, "perhaps the best part of Mister Death’s Blue-Eyed Girls is the dynamism of Nora as a character. She starts out as quite an immature young girl, with her biggest worry being if the popular jock notices her or not. Then we see Nora deeply questioning different aspects of her life as an outcome of the murders. Nora does question her faith as well, but in a respectful manner." Kathryn Johnson of Historical Novel Society stated, "Mary Downing Hahn has created an eerie and troubling glimpse into violence and loss. Moreover, she captures with perfect clarity the innocence of living in a time before technology became so much a part of our lives, and her evocative details of the era ring absolutely true."

== See also ==
- The Lovely Bones, a similar fiction novel about the murder of a teenage girl
- The Girl Next Door, a book about a boy recalling a teenage girl murdered in midcentury America
