= Oscar Solbert =

United States general (1885–1958)

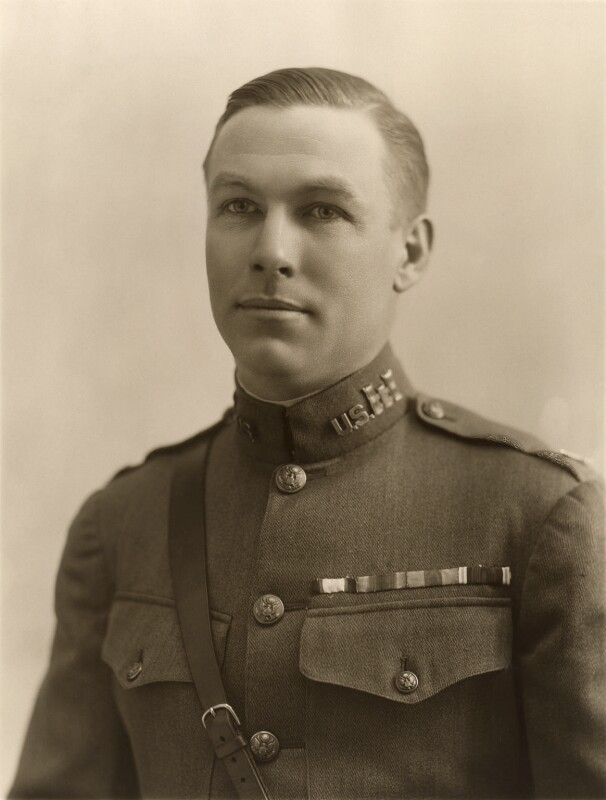
Solbert sometime in the 1920s

Oscar Nathaniel Solbert (originally Sohlberg; January 22, 1885 – April 16, 1958) was an American general, business executive and the first director of the George Eastman Museum.

== Early life ==
Oscar Sohlberg was born in a little town in the north of Sweden on January 22, 1885, one of a family of five children whose parents were simple people of modest circumstances. His childhood days in Sweden left him with a lifelong interest in the country and everything Swedish. When Sohlberg was eight years old, his family emigrated to the United States and settled in Worcester, Massachusetts. Here, he supplemented the family income by the traditional method of peddling newspapers as well as teaching school at night and working in summer resorts during vacations to help pay for his own schooling.

== West Point ==
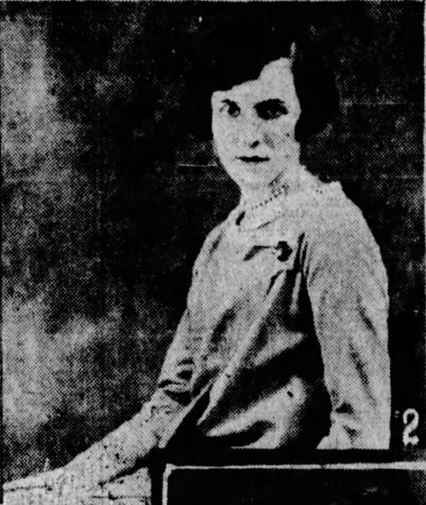
Elizabeth Abernathy Solbert

After two years at the Worcester Polytechnic Institute he received an appointment to West Point. History does not record whether he had his heart set on being a soldier at this time, but in any case he graduated sixth in his class in 1910 (one year after George S. Patton) and, in accordance with custom, entered the elite Corps of Engineers. Following various tours of duty he returned to the Academy in 1914 as an instructor, and had among his pupils Cadet Eisenhower, who evidently profited from Sohlbert's instruction.

In March 1917, he legally changed the spelling of his surname to Solbert.

It was during his tour of duty at the Academy that he was married to Elizabeth Abernathy (November 20, 1895 – March 13, 1973). They had first met at Fort Leavenworth, Kansas. They had a daughter, Ronni Solbert, and a son, Peter Solbert.

== World War I ==
When the United States entered World War I, the United States were almost entirely dependent on allies for intelligence on what was going on inside Germany. The Scandinavian countries adjacent to her were a potential source of information of great military value and, as a Military Attaché to the neutral countries of Denmark and Norway, Solbert shared with his colleagues the task of setting up a system of contacts within Germany to obtain these vital secrets. He was awarded the Distinguished Service Medal for his World War I service.

== Inter-war years ==
For five years after the first war, from 1919 to 1924, he served as Military Attaché in London. Between 1924 and 1925 he acted as Military Aide in the White House. In Washington he met Lawrence Whiting, a prominent Chicago industrialist, who offered him a job in Chicago. He resigned his commission as a major on September 20, 1925. While Solbert was still associated with Whiting, an old friend, Will Hays, who was then head of the Motion Picture Producers Association, borrowed his services to do a temporary job in Europe in connection with some international problems of the motion picture industry. The Eastman Kodak Company, a member of the association, was somewhat involved in this project, and was impressed with the skill with which the former army officer handled the negotiations. At the conclusion of his work, it was suggested that he join Kodak. With his unusual contacts all over the world, and his persuasive ability, he undertook a number of persuasive assignments for George Eastman with whom he was closely associated throughout his life, both in business and as a friend. George Eastman was a frequent visitor at the Solbert's home, and they accompanied him on several of his trips to Europe. It was during this period that Eastman was intensely interested in trying to secure the world-wide acceptance of the 13-month calendar so that, together with Moses B. Cotsworth - the father of the idea - Solbert traveled extensively in Europe on this project. This seems to have been one of the few occasions on which he failed to accomplish his mission.

When the Kodak International Photographic Contest was organized in 1931, an imposing list of royalty and other prominent personages were persuaded to lend their names as patrons of this event.

== World War II ==
With his military background, it was only natural that Solbert should return to the service in World War II. Here, again, he performed unusual services for which his background and international experience fitted him so well. He went in January 1943 to England, where his friend, Anthony Drexel Biddle, was assigned as Ambassador to the European governments in exile in London. It was a peculiarly difficult task to deal with governments which had no one to govern, and whose interests were not always wholly compatible with those of the warring allies, but Solbert's tact and personal knowledge of most of the countries he was dealing with won him the highest commendation from Ambassador Biddle and his charges. In July 1943, while still a Colonel, he became Chief of Special Services, Army Service Forces and Communications Zone, European Theater of Operations, and was promoted to Brigadier General in October 1944 in recognition of his successful work in organizing and directing entertainment, recreational, and educational programs for the men of that Theater. During this time, he intervened in General Patton's ongoing feud with Bill Mauldin, of whose cartoons he was a fan. Solbert was awarded the Legion of Merit and a Bronze Star Medal for his World War II service. At the war's end, he returned to Kodak as a member of the executive staff until his retirement from the company in 1949.

== Post-World War II ==
He was the first Director of the George Eastman Museum (then George Eastman House). Supported by curator Beaumont Newhall, Oscar Solbert was the guiding spirit behind many of the museums activities and responsible in large part for important additions to the physical plant of the institution. The Dryden Theatre, the Strong film vaults, and other important additions to the institution, were given by their donors in response to Solbert's presentation of the contribution these addition would make to the work of the museum. His friends were world wide and a reflection of his varied interests. Solbert had living quarters on the third floor of George Eastman's mansion until the day of his death, and continued to be a young appearing and vigorous individual who enjoyed life, belying his seventy three years.

Solbert died in his quarters on April 16, 1958 after suffering a heart attack. He was interred at Arlington National Cemetery eight days later.
