= Willo Davis Roberts =

American young adult novelist (1928-2004)

Willo Davis Roberts (May 29, 1928 – November 19, 2004) was an American writer, known primarily for award-winning children's mystery and suspense novels.

== Biography ==
Willo Louise Davis was born in Grand Rapids, Michigan. In 1949, she married David W. Roberts. She was originally trained as a paramedic and began writing in her spare time. Her first book, Murder At Grand Bay (published in 1955), was written for an adult market. Her first children's book, The View from the Cherry Tree, was published in 1975. Her books included The View from the Cherry Tree, Twisted Summer, Sugar Isn't Everything, Don't Hurt Laurie, Megan's Island, Baby-Sitting Is a Dangerous Job, Hostage, The Girl with the Silver Eyes, The One Left Behind, Scared Stiff, Caught!, and Undercurrents.

Roberts died of congestive heart failure at the age of 76 in Granite Falls, Washington. According to publisher Simon & Schuster, "The One Left Behind would have been her hundredth book."

== Awards ==
Davis won Edgar Allan Poe Awards ("Edgars") in 1989, 1995, and 1997 for best juvenile and best young adult mysteries. For her body of work, Davis was awarded the 1986 Pacific Northwest Writers Conference Achievement Award, and the 1990 Governor's Award for contribution to the field of children's literature in Washington State.

Awards for Don't Hurt Laurie!

- Notable Children's Trade Book in the Field of Social Studies, National Council for the Social Studies/Children's Book Council, 1977
- Young Hoosier Book Award, Association for Indiana Media Educators, 1980
- West Australian Young Readers Award, 1981
- Georgia Children's Book Award, University of Georgia, 1982

Awards for The Girl with the Silver Eyes

- Mark Twain Readers Award, Missouri Library Association and Missouri Association of School Librarians, 1983
- California Young Reader Medal, California Reading Association, 1986

Awards for Baby Sitting Is a Dangerous Job

- Mark Twain Readers Award
- Young Hoosier Book Award
- South Carolina Children's Book Award
