= Treasure Hunters: Secret of the Forbidden City =

2015 novel by James Patterson

- Treasure Hunters: Secret of the Forbidden City cover
- Author: James Patterson, Chris Grabenstein
- Cover artist: Juliana Neufeld
- Series: Treasure Hunters
- Genre: Fantasy, young-adult novel
- Published: 2015
- Publisher: Little, Brown and Company
- Publication place: United States
- Media type: Print (hardcover and paperback), audiobook, e-book
- Pages: 448 (hardcover)
- ISBN: 0316284807
- OCLC: 926881997
- LC Class: PZ7.P27653 Sec 2015
- Preceded by: Treasure Hunters: Danger Down the Nile
- Followed by: Treasure Hunters: Peril at the Top of the World

Treasure Hunters: Secret of the Forbidden City is a young adult children's literature adventure fiction book written by James Patterson with Chris Grabenstein. It is the third book in the Treasure Hunters series and the sequel to Treasure Hunters: Danger Down the Nile. It was published in 2015.

In this book, the Kidd siblings are desperately trying to secure an ancient Chinese artifact that will free their mother from renegade pirates. When the kidnappers force them to locate an even greater treasure – priceless paintings stolen by Nazis, the Kidds rely on their own cunning and experience to outwit the criminals while their mother's life is on the line.

== Plot summary ==
The Kidd siblings travel to Beijing with Timothy Quinn, their father's boss at CIA to get a Ming dynasty vase from the treasure they uncovered in the Indian Ocean to free their mother from the pirates. They speak to the Chinese High Cultural minister who gives them a government sanctioned official parade. While going to their hotel, they see four Germans stealing a painting by Pablo Picasso titled Naked Woman on the Beach, but they are unable to stop them.

Soon afterwards, they receive a menu for the Crystal Jade Palace, a Chinese restaurant from a passerby. Tommy remembers that their father had a favourite waiter in that restaurant named Liu Wei. They travel to the restaurant, where they meet Liu Wei who greets them and gives them fortune cookies as a parting gift. When they are leaving, the four Germans who stole the painting, realise they were watched by the Kidds and chase them. They go to their room and find out that their father had a safety deposit in China and gets the key to the locker from their fortune cookies. Timothy informs them that they can take the Ming vase if they find a way to unearth the Tomb of Qin Shi Huang, which is protected by mercury making it impossible to reach the tomb without inhaling mercury and dying.

On their way to the hotel, Bick sees their father flapping his arms like a bird and disappears, but dismisses this as a hallucination. The Kidds are assigned a cultural attache Jin Xiang and discover that they cannot leave the room without security. They receive a video recorded by pirates from their mother, after which they start to get messages from their father. They manage to fool the guards and send them to the Chinese Pigeon race like their father said. They then go to collect the safety deposit and find Chinese paper foldings (zhezhi) of pigeons in it. In these foldings, they find a diagram of a machine called SCUBBA written using invisible ink. The machine is designed in such a way that it can unearth Qin Shi Huang's tomb without inhaling mercury. They also find a message from their father telling them to meet in the Forbidden City. However he is unable to meet them and sends them further clues through messages, telling them to go to Germany.

The Kidds go to Timothy, who takes them to the High Cultural minister. He gives the Kidds the Ming vase in exchange for the diagram. Timothy asks the Kidds to trust him, with Bella Kilgore, who had survived jumping into the Nile (in Danger Down the Nile), backing him. He takes them to Dionsyous Strecking, the boss of Aramis. Bella takes the Ming vase from the Kidds, promising to return it when time comes to give it to their mother's kidnappers. It is revealed that Timothy works for Dionysous, rather than the CIA. They are sent to Germany to find their father's treasure using Tommy's memory from their last visit when they were young.

They journey to their safe house in Munich where they find a painting by Marc Chagall. Dionsyous takes the painting to fill a museum owned by the Chinese cultural minister, who pays him in return. The Kidds manage to create a racket and succeed in getting a ticket to cinema, where they escape with the help of Petra Pichelsteiner, a German girl and takes her along with them. She reveals herself to be the daughter of their parent's friends. The Kidds call Timothy, who mocks them but unknownly gives them a clue. They go to a museum in Neuburg, where they find paintings hidden by the Nazis. Dionsyous arrives and takes the painting, however Petra calls the Interpol and they arrive. All his henchmen are arrested except Timothy and a man named Franz Hans. The Kidds see their ship, the Lost, in the Isar river with their parents in them. They are followed by Timothy in a speedboat and Dionsyous in a helicopter. Timothy falls into a strong current. The Kidds use a jet pack and strikes Dionysous's helicopter and falls. Timothy and Dionsyous are arrested. The Kidd family is reunited and sets sail for Russia to find the Amber room.
