= I'm Not Who You Think I Am =

Book by Peg Kehret

- Paperback edition cover
- Author: Peg Kehret
- Illustrator: ?
- Cover artist: ?
- Language: English
- Genre: Young adult novel
- Publisher: Dutton Juvenile
- Publication date: April 1, 1999
- Publication place: United States
- Media type: Print (Hardback & Paperback)
- Pages: 154 pp
- ISBN: 0-525-46153-1
- OCLC: 39727785
- LC Class: PZ7.K2518 Iae 1999
- Preceded by: The Blizzard Disaster (Frightmares Series) (1998)
- Followed by: Shelter Dogs (1999)

I'm Not Who You Think I Am is an American novel for young adults by Peg Kehret, published in 1999.

== Plot ==
Thirteen-year-old Ginger becomes the target of a disturbed lady who believes that Ginger is her daughter. Ginger becomes distressed when the woman, Joyce, begins to stalk her. Joyce uses the help of her brother-in-law, while Ginger's parents are out of town, to speak to Ginger and convince Ginger to go with Joyce.

== Reception ==
Kirkus Reviews finds "While the story reads like a thriller, the character development and moral dilemmas add depth and substance." while Publishers Weekly says "Thriller buffs may be disappointed by the thin characterizations and contrivances, ... most readers will want to stick around long enough to see how she escapes Joyce's clutches."
