= I Funny =

Realistic fiction middle school novel

I Funny: A Middle School Story
- Authors: James Patterson and Chris Grabenstein
- Illustrator: Laura Park
- Language: English
- Series: Upper school
- Genre: Comedy
- Publisher: Little, Brown and Company
- Publication date: December 10, 2012
- Publication place: United States
- Media type: Print (hardcover or paperback)
- Pages: 305
- Followed by: I Even Funnier

I Funny: A Middle School Story, also known as I Funny, is a realistic fiction novel by James Patterson and Chris Grabenstein. It was published by Little, Brown and Company in 2012. It was followed by I Even Funnier (2013), I Totally Funniest (2015), I Funny TV (2016), I Funny: School of Laughs (2017) and The Nerdiest, Wimpiest, Dorkiest I Funny Ever (2018).

== Summary ==
Wheelchair-using middle-schooler Jamie Grimm has recently moved in with his aunt's cheerless family after his own family died in a car crash that left him paralyzed from the waist down. Despite Jamie's desire to be treated like an ordinary kid and his struggles with grief for his lost family, he is a natural comedian and displays this in his day-to-day life. Much of this is fueled by his friends’ reactions to his one-liners and the encouragement of his warmhearted uncle. He enters a local comedy contest, wins it, and eventually goes on to win the New York state kid comic contest.

== Characters ==
- Jamie Grimm is the disabled protagonist of the story. He enters the Planet's Funniest Kid Comic Contest and wins the Long Island competition, then moves on to the state competition and wins. He was involved in a serious car accident two years prior that killed his parents and his younger sister, Jenny, and left him paralyzed from the legs down and put him in a wheelchair. He lives in Long Beach, New York, with his aunt and uncle and their three children (who he refers to as "the Smileys" because they never smile or laugh). He uses comedy as a way of coping with his emotions and dealing with things in his everyday life.
- Suzie Orolvsky (whom Jamie refers to as "Cool Girl") is a popular girl whom Jamie has a crush on for a time.
- Stevie Kosgrov is Jamie's cousin and adoptive brother, and the middle school bully. He is often cruel to Jamie, picking on him for his disability.
- Uncle Frankie is Jamie's other uncle. He owns a diner and is shown to be very talented with yo-yo tricks. He is close with Jamie.
- Joey Gaynor is one of Jamie's best friends. He is shown to be obsessed with girls.
- Jimmy Pierce is another of Jamie's best friends. He is said to be nerdy and is very smart.
- Gilda Gold is another of Jamie's best friends, whom he develops a crush on later in the series. She assists him in creating new jokes, and she uploads his sets to YouTube.
- Shecky is a boy from Schenectady who competes in the New York finals against Jamie. He tells distasteful and insulting jokes, and is overconfident and arrogant.
- Judy Nazemetz is a girl from Manhattan who competes in the New York finals. She becomes friendly with Jamie during their time backstage.
