= Peg Kehret =

American author (1936–2025)

Margaret Ann Kehret (née Schulze; November 11, 1936 – December 7, 2025) was an American author, primarily writing for children between the ages of 10 and 15. After beating three types of polio at age 12, Kehret went on to become an author of children's, young adults', and adults' literature, winning over fifty awards throughout her career.

== Background ==
Margaret Ann Schulze was born in La Crosse, Wisconsin, on November 11, 1936. She contracted polio at age 12 in 1949. She had each of the three types of polio: spinal, respiratory, and bulbar. She was paralyzed from the neck down and had a nine-month hospital stay. The experience changed Kehret's life, as she describes in her 1996 memoir Small Steps: The Year I Got Polio. Kehret made a complete recovery aside from lingering post-polio syndrome. She later graduated from Austin High School and then attended the University of Minnesota for one year. In 1955, she married Carl Kehret; they moved to California and adopted two children, Bob and Anne.

In 1970, the Kehrets moved to Washington. Carl died in 2004. Kehret had four grandchildren: Brett, Chelsea, Eric, and Mark. She had a great-grandson, Seth, who also lived in Washington. Kehret resided near Mt. Rainier National Park.

Kehret spent six weeks every spring and fall visiting schools across the country, but later had to cut these visits due to difficulties caused by post-polio syndrome. In addition to being a writer, she spent much of her life rescuing and caring for animals, including volunteering at the Seattle humane society for more than 25 years, inspiring many of her fictional works. Following her husband's passing in 2004, Kehret maintained her passion by continuing to foster cats. She also wrote a "Pet of the Month" column for her local newspaper alongside her volunteer work with animals.

Kehret died on December 7, 2025, at the age of 89.

== Career ==
Before Kehret began writing children's books, she wrote plays, radio commercials and magazine stories. Her transition to writing for children stems from what she cites as the importance of children’s books: undoing negative effects left on children by mainstream media, movies, and video games and instead, teaching them empathy. She weaves character growth and age appropriate moral dilemmas into her forty-six works for middle school students, including four children's drama books.

Her work is divided into subgenres of memoir, natural disaster, animal, novel, and horror adventure books. One of her most famous memoirs is Small Steps: The Year I Got Polio, in which she writes about her diagnosis and treatment in great detail. Her natural disaster novels include Escaping the Giant Wave and Earthquake Terror which use fictional stories to teach children on the dangers of natural disasters. Books inspired by her work with animals include Saving Lilly and her Pete The Cat trilogy. Some of Kehret's most popular novels are Stolen Children, Abduction!, and Runaway Twin. She wrote a Frightmares series consisting of eight books as well.

== Awards and recognition ==
Kehret's books for young people have earned a wide readership and critical acclaim. Among her many honors are the Pen Center West Award in Children's Literature, the Golden Kite Award from the Society of Children's Book Writers and illustrators. Children's Choice Awards from 29 states, the Forest Roberts Playwriting Award, and the Henry Bergh Award from the ASPCA. Many for her books have been selected by the American Library Association for its Recommended Books for Reluctant Readers. In total, her books have won more than fifty state young reader awards.

Kehret's polio memoir received a starred review from Kirkus Reviews, won the 1998 Dorothy Canfield Fisher Children's Book Award - annually determined by a vote of Vermont schoolchildren, and won the 1999 Mark Twain Readers Award - a similar annual book award determined by a vote of Missouri schoolchildren in grades 4 to 6. The award recognized four of her books from 1999 to 2012: Abduction!, Runaway Twin, Small Steps: The Year I Got Polio, and Stolen Children.

The Children’s Choices project allows 10,000 school children across the country to vote on newly published works that they enjoyed. The project is of a joint committee supported by the International Reading Association and The Children’s Book Council. Over 700 books, selected by publishers from books published in 2000, were evaluated in 2001. The 99 books with the most votes were selected to be the Children’s choices for 2001, one being Don’t Tell Anyone by Peg Kehret.

She was awarded the Charlotte Award sponsored by the New York State Reading Association for her work Stolen Children in 2010.

== Selected works ==
=== Fiction ===
- Deadly Stranger (Dodd, Mead, 1987) ISBN 9780396090397
- Nightmare Mountain (Dutton, 1989) ISBN 9780525650089
- Sisters, Long Ago (Dutton, 1990) ISBN 9780525650218
- Cages (Dutton, 1991) ISBN 9780525650621
- Night of Fear (Dutton, 1994) ISBN 9780525651369
- The Richest Kids in Town (Dutton, 1994) ISBN 9780525651666
- Earthquake Terror (Dutton, 1996) ISBN 9780525652267
- Searching for Candlestick Park (Dutton, 1997) ISBN 9780525652564
- The Secret Journey (Simon & Schuster, 1999) ISBN 9780671034160
- I'm Not Who You Think I Am (Dutton, 1999) ISBN 9780525461531
- My Brother Made Me Do It (Simon & Schuster, 2000) ISBN 9780671034184
- Don't Tell Anyone (Dutton, 2000) ISBN 9780525463887
- Saving Lilly (Aladdin, 2001) ISBN 9780671034221
- Escaping the Giant Wave (Simon & Schuster Books for Young Readers, 2003) ISBN 9780689852725
- Abduction! (Dutton, 2006) ISBN 9780142406175
- The Ghost's Grave (Dutton, 2005) ISBN 9780525461623
- Stolen Children (Dutton, 2008) ISBN 9780525478355
- Runaway Twin (Dutton, 2009) ISBN 9780525421771
- Ghost Dog Secrets (Dutton, 2010) ISBN 9780525421788
- Dangerous Deception (Dutton, 2014) ISBN 9780525426523

==== Disaster series ====
1. The Volcano Disaster (Simon & Schuster, 1998) ISBN 9780671009694
2. The Blizzard Disaster (Minstrel, 1998) ISBN 9780671009632
3. Flood Disaster (Minstrel, 1999) ISBN 9780671009670

==== Ellen and Corey series ====
1. Terror at the Zoo (Dutton, 1992) ISBN 9780525650836
2. Horror at the Haunted House (Dutton, 1992) ISBN 9780525651062
3. Danger at the Fair (Dutton, 1995) ISBN 9780525651826

==== Frightmares series ====
1. Cat Burglar on the Prowl (Minstrel, 1995) ISBN 9780671891886
2. Bone Breath and the Vandals (Simon & Schuster, 1995) ISBN 9780671891909
3. Don't Go Near Mrs. Tallie (Minstrel, 1995) ISBN 9780671891916
4. Desert Danger (Aladdin, 1995) ISBN 9780671891930
5. The Ghost Followed Us Home (Minstrel, 1996) ISBN 9780671535216
6. Race to Disaster (Minstrel, 1996) ISBN 9780671535247
7. Screaming Eagles (Aladdin, 1996) ISBN 9780671535261
8. Backstage Fright (Minstrel, 1996) ISBN 9780671535285

==== Pete the Cat series ====
1. The Stranger Next Door (Dutton, 2002) ISBN 9780525468295
2. Spy Cat (Dutton, 2003) ISBN 9780142401514
3. Trapped (Dutton, 2006) ISBN 9780525477280

=== Drama ===
- Let Him Sleep 'Till It's Time for His Funeral (Hanbury Plays, 1976), ISBN 9781852050139
- Spirit! (Pioneer Drama Service, 1979)
- Winning Monologues for Young Actors: 65 honest-to-life characterizations to delight young actors and audiences of all ages (Colorado Springs, CO: Meriwether Publishing, 1986) ISBN 9781439510230
- Encore!: More Winning Monologues for Young Actors : 63 More Honest-to-Life Monologues for Teenage Boys and Girls (Meriwether, 1988) ISBN 9780916260545
- Acting Natural (Meriwether Publishing, 1991) ISBN 9780916260842
- Tell It Like It Is: Fifty Monologues for Talented Teens (Meriwether Publishing, 2007) ISBN 9781566081443

=== Nonfiction ===
- Vows of Love and Marriage (Meriwether Publishing, 1980) ISBN 9780916260071
- Refinishing and Restoring Your Piano (Blue Ridge Summit, PA: Tab Books, 1985) ISBN 978-0830618712
- Wedding Vows: How to Express Your Love in Your Own Words (Meriwether Publishing, 1989) ISBN 9780916260590
- Small Steps: The Year I Got Polio (Morton Grove, IL: Albert Whitman, 1996) ISBN 9780807574577
- Shelter Dogs: Amazing Stories of Adopted Strays (Perfection Learning, 1999) ISBN 9781627652377
- Five Pages A Day: A Writer's Journey (Albert Whitman & Company, 2002) ISBN 9780807586501
- Animals Welcome: A Life of Reading, Writing, and Rescue (Dutton Children's Books, 2012) ISBN 9780525423997
