= Small Steps: The Year I Got Polio =

1996 memoir by Peg Kehret

- Author: Peg Kehret
- Illustrator: Wyatt Bechdel
- Language: English
- Subject: Polio
- Genre: Memoir
- Published: 1996 (Albert Whitman & Company)
- Publication place: United States
- Pages: 179
- Awards: Dorothy Canfield Fisher Children's Book Award Golden Kite Award Mark Twain Readers Award
- ISBN: 0-8075-7457-0

Small Steps: The Year I Got Polio is a memoir of author Peg Kehret's childhood experience of polio. The book won the Golden Kite Award in 1997.

== Characters ==
- Peg: Main character and narrator of the story, diagnosed with polio.
- Karen: Peg's best friend at school
- Tommy: Peg's hospital roommate at University Hospital, in an iron lung.
- Renee: Sheltering Arms roommate, who goes home for Christmas.
- Shirley: Sheltering Arms roommate, who has the worst polio and likes marshmallows. She dies from Polio five years after the events of the book.
- Alice: Sheltering Arms roommate, who has been there for ten years. Her parents didn't want to take care of her because she was so badly crippled, and she became a ward of the state. She dies from cancer in 1993.
- Dorothy: Sheltering Arms roommate, who longs to be in leg braces to go home. She is able to return home because her family builds her a ramp.
- Mrs. Crab: Peg's physical therapist at University Hospital, whom Peg doesn't like. She gives her Torture Time: hot packs and stretching. Peg highly disliked her.
- Art: Peg's older brother whom Dorothy adores. Art is a college student.
- Dr. Bevis: Peg's doctor at University Hospital. Peg promises to walk for him one day.
- Miss. Ballard: Peg's physical therapist at Sheltering Arms that Peg is very fond of and she is also very good friends with Peg's parents.
- Kenny: A boy who plays in the Christmas pageant who helped Peg. He was going to be discharged the day after that.
- Mom: Peg's supportive mother
- Dad: Peg's supportive father
- B.J.: Peg's dog who almost got locked in the basement when she returned home for Christmas.

== Settings ==
The story takes place in Peg's school, Peg's house, at the Sheltering Arms, and at the University Hospital beginning in 1949.

== Reception ==
Small Steps won the Dorothy Canfield Fisher Children's Book Award, the Golden Kite Award in 1997 and the Mark Twain Readers Award in 1997.
