= 1971–1972 Mark Twain Awards =

The Mark Twain Readers Award is given annually to a book for children in grades four through six.

== Winner ==
Sounder by William Armstrong

== Nominations ==
- Search for Delicious by Natalie Babbitt
- Before You Came This Way by Byrd Baylor
- Mystery of Stonehenge by Franklyn M. Branley
- Come Along by Rebecca Caudill
- Where the Lilies Bloom by Vera Cleaver & William Cleaver
- Weathermonger by Peter Dickinson
- Year of Columbus 1492 by Genevieve Foster
- King's Falcon by Paula Fox
- Portrait of Ivan by Paula Fox
- Cavalcade of Goblins by Alan Garner
- Knights and Armor by Shirley Glubok
- Our Eddie by Sulsmith Ish-kishor
- About the B'Nai Bagels by E. L. Konigsburg
- America's Endangered Wildlife by George Laycock
- One to Grow On by Jean Little
- Odd Destiny by Milton Lomask
- A Book of Ghosts and Goblins by Ruth Manning-Sanders
- Goodbye, Dove Square by Janet McNeill
- Tucker's Countryside by George Selden
- Journey Outside by Mary Q. Steele
- Trouble in the Jungle by John Rowe Townsend
- Thy Friend, Obadiah by Brinton Turkle
