= Thelma and Corydon Bell =

American authors (died 1980s)

Thelma Harrington Bell (1896–1985) and Corydon Whitten Bell (1894–1980) were American authors from the state of North Carolina. As a husband and wife team, they wrote and illustrated a number of children's books, many set in North Carolina. In 1961, Thelma Bell received the Dorothy Canfield Fisher Children's Book Award for Captain Ghost, and several of the Bells' books have been Junior Literary Guild selections. Corydon Bell also did illustrations for magazines and books by other writers.

As well as children's novels, they produced some children's science books on weather and time.

== Biography ==
Corydon Whitten Bell was born in Tiffin, Ohio on July 16, 1894, while Thelma Harrington Bell was born July 3, 1896, in Detroit, Michigan. While studying re-medicine at the University of Michigan, Corydon was called to serve in World War I, where he was stationed at Fort Jackson (South Carolina). After the war, he switched his focus from medicine to graphic arts, then studied English at Western Reserve University. Thelma also studied at Western Reserve University, receiving a Bachelor of Arts in English.

After the couple married, they lived in Ohio, where they worked in copyediting and advertising. They had three children. In 1944, after their children left for university, the Bells moved to Sapphire, North Carolina, where many of their books are set. The couple eventually moved to Knoxville, Tennessee.

The Bell's books have received various accolades. Captain Ghost won Thelma the AAUW Award (1959) and Dorothy Canfield Fisher Children's Book Award (1961). Additionally, both Captain Ghost and Yaller Eye are Junior Library Guild books.

Corydon died in June 1980, and Thelma died in May 1985.

== Selected books ==
- Yaller-Eye, 1951
- Take It Easy, 1953
- Snow, 1954 (non-fiction)
- Captain Ghost, 1959
- Thunderstorm, 1960 (non-fiction)
- The Two Worlds of Davy Blount, 1962
- The Riddle of Time, 1963 (non-fiction)
- A Dash of Pepper, 1965
