= Ronni Solbert =

American illustrator and artist (1925–2022)

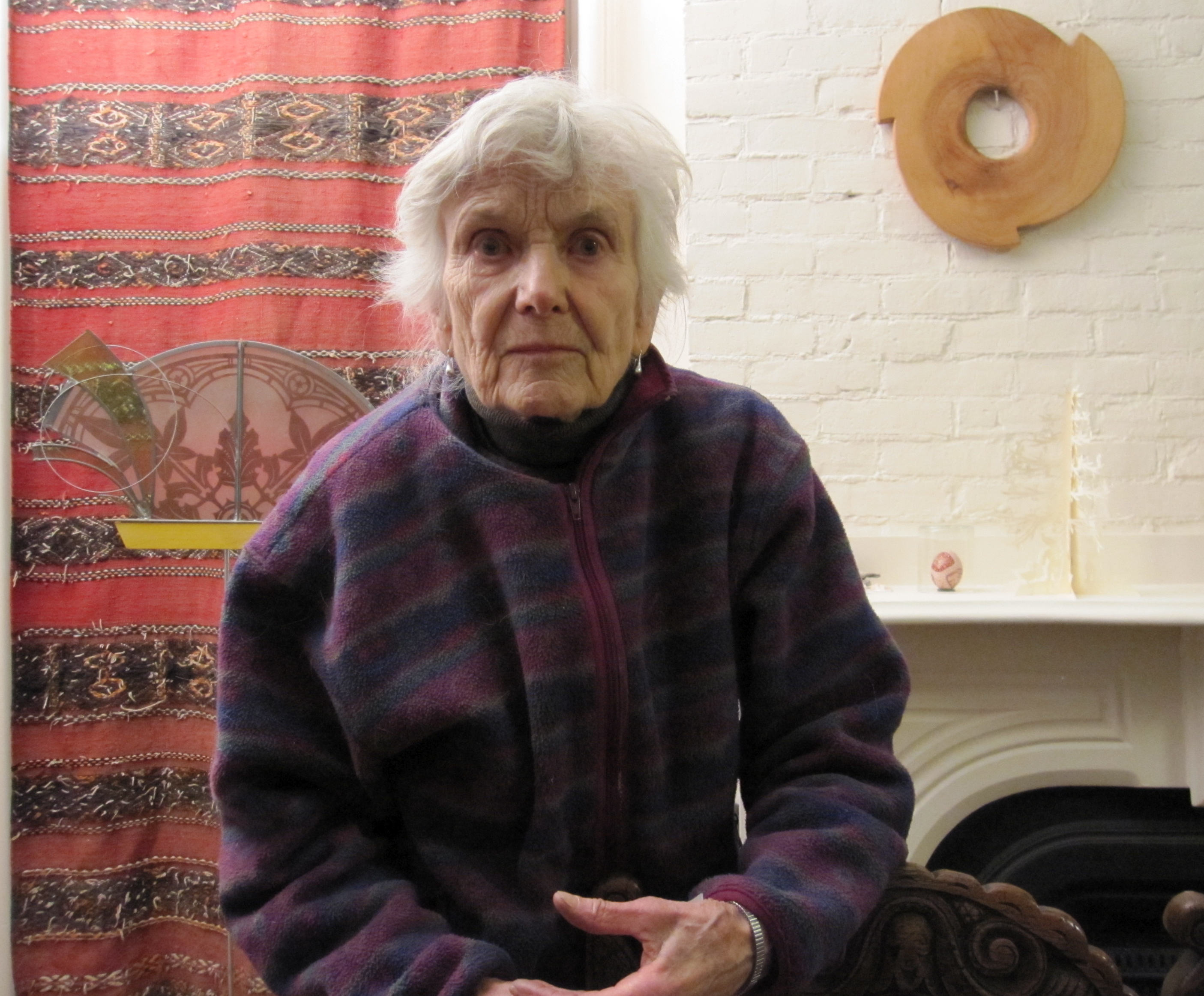
- Solbert in 2009
- Born: Romaine Gustave Solbert; September 7, 1925; Washington, D.C., U.S.
- Died: June 9, 2022 (aged 96); Randolph, Vermont, U.S.
- Occupation(s): Illustrator, artist, photographer, author
- Years active: 1951–2022
- Notable work: The Pushcart War, Bronzeville Boys and Girls

Romaine Gustave Solbert (September 7, 1925 – June 9, 2022) was an American artist, photographer, and author, known primarily as an illustrator of books, including The Pushcart War and more than a dozen other titles written by her partner Jean Merrill.

== Early life and education ==
Solbert was born in Washington, D.C. and grew up in Rochester, New York. Her father was Oscar Nathaniel Solbert, a Swedish immigrant who became a general in the United States Army, serving in both World War I and World War II. He later worked as an executive at the Eastman Kodak Company before becoming the first director of the George Eastman House International Museum of Photography and Film. During his early military career, Oscar Solbert met and married Elizabeth Abernaty. Their daughter was given the name "Romaine," after an aunt, but that name was shortened to "Ronni." Solbert attended Vassar College, graduating with honors in 1946, and continued her studies at Cranbrook Academy of Art in Michigan, where she earned an M.F.A. in 1948.

== Career ==
After graduating from Cranbrook, Solbert worked in Stockholm, Sweden, where she did translating and broadcasting work for the International Red Cross. Thereafter she taught children painting and sculpture at University of Rochester. She also studied and worked in Robert Blackburn's Graphic Workshop in New York City. She worked in India with support of the Fulbright Program and she served as a judge in Shankar's International Children's Art Competition (Merrill was also a Fulbright scholar in India.).

Solbert returned to New York to pursue a career in art and illustration. In 1959, the Museum of Modern Art featured Solbert's paintings in one of the museum's "New Talent" exhibitions and one of her prints is held at MOMA.

While living in New York, Solbert met Merrill (who, coincidentally, had also grown up near Rochester). While in New York, the couple lived in Tompkins Square Park in the East Village and were active in the community. In 1962 Solbert and Merrill bought a farm in Washington, Vermont where they spent summers. In 1971 they moved to Randolph, Vermont.

Solbert taught in the MFA Visual Arts Program at Vermont College in Montpelier. A fire in her Randolph studio destroyed her paintings after which she began working in sculpture, photography and works on paper. She continued to produce artwork into her 90s.

== Death and legacy ==
Merrill died of cancer in 2012. Solbert died in Randolph, Vermont, on June 9, 2022, at the age of 96. Their joint papers from the 1960s are held by the American Heritage Center at the University of Wyoming. Solbert's children's book illustrations are held by the Children's Literature Research Collections at the University of Minnesota.

== Works ==
While predominantly known as an illustrator, Solbert has also worked as an author, editor, photographer, sculptor and painter. Her published work includes:

=== As Illustrator ===
- Jean Merrill, Henry, the Hand-Painted Mouse, Coward, 1951.
- Jean Merrill, The Woover, Coward, 1952.
- Jean Merrill, Boxes, Coward, 1953.
- Jean Merrill, The Tree House of Jimmy Domino, Oxford University Press, 1955.
- Jean Merrill, The Travels of Marco, Knopf, 1956.
- Henry Chafetz, The Lost Dream, Knopf, 1956.
- Gwendolyn Brooks, Bronzeville Boys and Girls, Harper, 1957. (Note: A new edition of these poems with illustrations by Faith Ringgold rather than Solbert was published in 2007.)
- Elizabeth Johnson, The Little Knight, Little, Brown, 1957.
- Jean Merrill, A Song for Gar, Whittlesey House, 1957.
- Elizabeth Low, Mouse, Mouse, Go Out of My House, Little, Brown, 1958.
- Henry Chafetz, The Legend of Befana, Houghton, 1958.
- Audrey McKim, Andy and the Gopher, Little, Brown, 1959.
- Aline Harvard, Run Away Home, Lothrop, 1959.
- Jean Merrill and Eunice Holsaert, Outer Space, Henry Holt, 1959.
- Kay Boyle, The Youngest Camel, Harper, 1959.
- Jean Merrill, Blue's Broken Heart, Whittlesey House, 1960.
- Jean Merrill, Shan's Lucky Knife, W. R. Scott, 1960.
- Jean Merrill, Emily Emerson's Moon, Little, Brown, 1960.
- Parvati Thampi, Geeta and the Village School, Doubleday, 1960.
- Marion Garthwaite, Mario, Doubleday, 1960.
- Elizabeth Johnson, The Three-in-One-Prince, Little, Brown, 1960.
- Elizabeth Low, Snug in the Snow, Little, Brown, 1963.
- Jean Merrill, The Superlative Horse, W. R. Scott, 1963.
- Jean Merrill, High, Wide and Handsome, W. R. Scott, 1964.
- Jean Merrill, The Pushcart War, W. R. Scott, 1964.
- Violet Weingarten, The Nile, Lifeline of Egypt, Garrard, 1964.
- Adele De Leeuw, Indonesian Legends and Folk Tales, Thomas Nelson, 1964.
- Henry Chafetz, Thunderbird and Other Stories, Pantheon, 1965.
- Mary Neville, Woody and Me, Pantheon, 1966.
- Virginia Haviland, Favorite Fairy Tales Told in Sweden, Little, Brown, 1966.
- Jean Merrill, The Elephant Who Liked to Smash Small Cars, Pantheon, 1967.
- Jean Merrill, Red Riding, Pantheon, 1968.
- Jean Merrill, The Black Sheep, Pantheon, 1969.
- Kobayashi Issa, A Few Flies and I: Haiku by Issa, Pantheon, 1969 (also editor, with Merrill).
- Jean Merrill, Mary, Come Running, McCall, 1970.
- Giose Rimanelli and Paul Pinsleur, Pictures Make Poems, Pantheon, 1972.
- Mary Ann Hoberman, Nuts to You and Nuts to Me, Knopf, 1974.
- Salley Hovey Wriggins, White Monkey King, Pantheon, 1977.

=== As author and illustrator ===
- 32 Feet of Insides, Pantheon, 1970.
- The Song that Sings Itself, Bobbs-Merrill, 1972.

=== As author and photographer ===
- I Wrote My Name on the Wall, Brown, 1971.
