= Escape from Mr. Lemoncello's Library =

2013 novel by Chris Grabenstein

- The cover of Escape from Mr. Lemoncello's Library (first edition)
- Author: Chris Grabenstein
- Original title: Escape from Mr. Lemoncello's Library
- Cover artist: David Kyle
- Language: English
- Series: Mr. Lemoncello's Library
- Subject: Mystery
- Genre: Children's novel
- Publisher: Random House
- Publication date: June 25, 2013
- Publication place: United States
- Media type: Print (hardback)
- Pages: 288
- ISBN: 037587089X
- Dewey Decimal: 3.14

Escape from Mr. Lemoncello's Library is a children's novel by American author Chris Grabenstein. It was on the New York Times bestseller list for Middle Grade novels for 111 weeks between 2013 and 2016, peaking at #8 in hardback and #2 in paperback.

Grabenstein has stated that the book contains a secret puzzle that readers can decode. To solve it, he offers some advice given by Mr. Lemoncello in the book: "Forget the Industrial Revolution, my first idea might be your best solution."

== Plot ==
Twelve-year-old Kyle Keeley loves games of all kinds, especially the board games and video games created by beloved game maker, Luigi Lemoncello. The morning after getting grounded for breaking a window while playing one of Lemoncello's games, Kyle's friend Akimi Hughes tells him of an essay for a school contest. The winners will be the first to visit the new, grand library in Kyle's town of Alexandriaville, Ohio. Initially, Kyle wasn't interested in books. When he realized the new library would offer games and computers, he quickly made a very brief attempt.

At school, Kyle discovers that Mr. Lemoncello designed and funded the new library and that he plans to judge the essay contest. Mr. Lemoncello credits much of his success to the help of Alexandriaville's old public library in his childhood. Regretful that he missed out on a great opportunity, Kyle tries to hand in a much stronger essay late, but his teacher refuses to accept it. Undeterred, Kyle finds Mr. Lemoncello's email address and sends the essay directly to him. When Mr. Lemoncello arrives at Kyle's school to announce the essay contest winners, world-famous librarian Dr. Yanina Zinchenko explains that they will experience the grand new library in an overnight visit. Then Mr. Lemoncello walks onto the stage and announces the winners: Kyle, Akimi, helpful Miguel Fernandez, nerd Andrew Peckleman, Bridgette Wadge, bookworm Sierra Russell, over-eager Yasmeen Smith-Snyder, Sean Keegan, popular girl Haley Daley, soccer player Rose Vermette, over-eager Kayla Corson, and bully Charles Chiltington.

That night, the children enter the library. They play a trivia game with the prize of sleeping in the library's opulent bedroom suite which Charles wins and they compete to find a dessert for the prize of early entry to the Electronic Learning Center. Kyle and Akimi pair up to win that. Other activities that night include watching an IMAX movie and seeing an animatronic presidential debate.

The next morning, Mr. Lemoncello announces a new game: the first to escape the library within twenty-four hours will win the chance to appear in Lemoncello game commercials and earn money as the company spokesperson. Sean, Kayla, and Rose choose not to stay, and Bridgette and Yasmeen are eliminated early, so Kyle, Akimi, and Sierra form a team. Meanwhile, Charles focuses on the fake book covers in the "Staff Picks" display case in the library entryway and soon begins to find rebus clues in the hard copies of those titles. Kyle guesses that the different books pictured on the backs of their new library cards are a clue as his team pursues those. Soon Miguel joins Kyle's team, and Charles forces Haley and Andrew into joining forces with him.

By late that night despite Charles's insistence that he will win, he is concerned that Kyle's team is doing well. So, he convinces Andrew to steal Sierra's library card to gain access to the private meeting room where Team Kyle's collected clues and hints are displayed. Andrew is caught trying to do that in the morning and ejected from the game. Haley decides to change sides.

After several more games, Charles attempts to strongarm the last clue from Kyle in a physical confrontation. Charles is caught and removed from the game. Kyle and his friends decipher the last of the clues and escape the library just in time.

== Characters ==
- Kyle Keeley - A huge fan of Mr. Lemoncello and Lemoncello Games who doesn't read a lot of books, but learns to keep a must-read list from Sierra Russell. Captain of Team Kyle.
- Charles Chiltington - An abominably rude boy who'll do anything to win, even if it means sabotaging the rules or his fellow middle-schoolers. Captain of Team Charles.
- Akimi Hughes - Kyle's best friend who's one of the dozens of people who are super excited about the new secretive library. Member of Team Kyle.
- Miguel Fernandez - The intelligent and enthusiastic president of a school book club and another of Kyle's friends. He operated solo before joining Team Kyle.
- Andrew Peckleman - Miguel's friend-turned-enemy and an easily tempered book-lover who knows his way around the Dewey Decimal System. He operated solo before joining Team Charles. Andrew is eliminated trying to steal Sierra's library card.
- Haley Daley - A sometimes snobby spokesmodel, but is soft deep down in her heart and is competing in the competition to aid her financially struggling family. She operated solo before joining Team Charles and later defecting to Team Kyle.
- Sierra Russell - A quiet and shy bookworm whose parents are divorced, but learns to loosen up during the competition. Member of Team Kyle.
- Sean Keegan - A competitor in the contest who is among those that forfeit early because he thought the contest was lame.
- Kayla Corson - An over-eager competitor in the contest who is among those that forfeit early.
- Rose Vermette - A soccer player competitor in the contest who is among those that forfeit early.
- Bridgette Wadge - A competitor in the contest who is among those eliminated early.
- Yasmeen Smith-Snyder - An over-eager competitor in the contest who was eliminated for misinterpreting the rules.
- Mr. Luigi L. Lemoncello - The shy and quiet creator of Lemoncello Games and the Lemoncello Library dropping poeticly scripted clues throughout the escape game.
- Dr. Yanina Zinchenko - The world-famous head librarian of the Lemoncello Library who is the only one who knows how to get out of the library.
- Mrs. Gail Tobin - Mr. Lemoncello's former librarian who died at some point and is the new holographic assistant of the library.

== Awards ==
Escape from Mr. Lemoncello's Library was a New York Times bestseller for Children's Middle Grade and received positive reviews. Giving it a starred review, Kirkus Reviews praised the book as a "solid, tightly plotted read" full of puzzles and puns. Publishers Weekly called it "that perfect book that isn’t girly or boyish, but is just a good book for any middle-grade reader." Reviewers (including author James Patterson, a frequent collaborator of Grabenstein's) also compared the book favorably to Roald Dahl's Charlie and the Chocolate Factory.

The novel was also the 2013 winner of the Agatha Award for Best Children's/Young Adult Novel. This was the fourth time that Grabenstein won this award, the first for his novel The Crossroads.

It has also won several Children's Choice State Book Awards:

- Arizona, Grand Canyon Reader Award
- Delaware, Blue Hen Book Award
- Florida, Sunshine State Young Readers Award
- Indiana, Young Hoosier Book Award, Intermediate
- Kansas, William Allen White Children's Book Award
- Maine, Student Book Award
- Maryland, Black-Eyed Susan Book Award
- Minnesota, Maud Hart Lovelace Award
- Mississippi, Magnolia Award
- Missouri, Mark Twain Readers Award
- Nebraska, Golden Sower Award
- New Hampshire, Great Stone Face Book Award
- New Jersey, Garden State Book Award
- North Dakota, Flicker Tale Children's Book Award
- Ohio, Buckeye Children's and Teen Book Award
- Oregon, Reader's Choice Award
- Pacific Northwest Library Association, Young Reader's Choice Award
- Rhode Island, Rhode Island Children's Book Award
- Tennessee, Volunteer State Book Award
- Vermont, Dorothy Canfield Fisher Book Award
- Virginia, Virginia Reader's Choice Award

In 2016, Escape from Mr. Lemoncello's Library was given the Mark Twain Readers Award by the Missouri Association of School Librarians.

== Sequels ==
A sequel titled Mr. Lemoncello's Library Olympics was released on January 6, 2016.

The third book, called Mr. Lemoncello's Great Library Race, was released on October 10, 2017.

The fourth book is entitled Mr. Lemoncello's All-Star Breakout Game, which was released on May 7, 2019.

The fifth book in the series, Mr. Lemoncello and the Titanium Ticket, was released on August 25, 2020.

A prequel titled Mr. Lemoncello's Very First Game was released on May 3, 2022.

The sixth and final book in the series, Mr. Lemoncello's Fantabulous Finale, was released on November 5, 2024.

== Adaptation ==
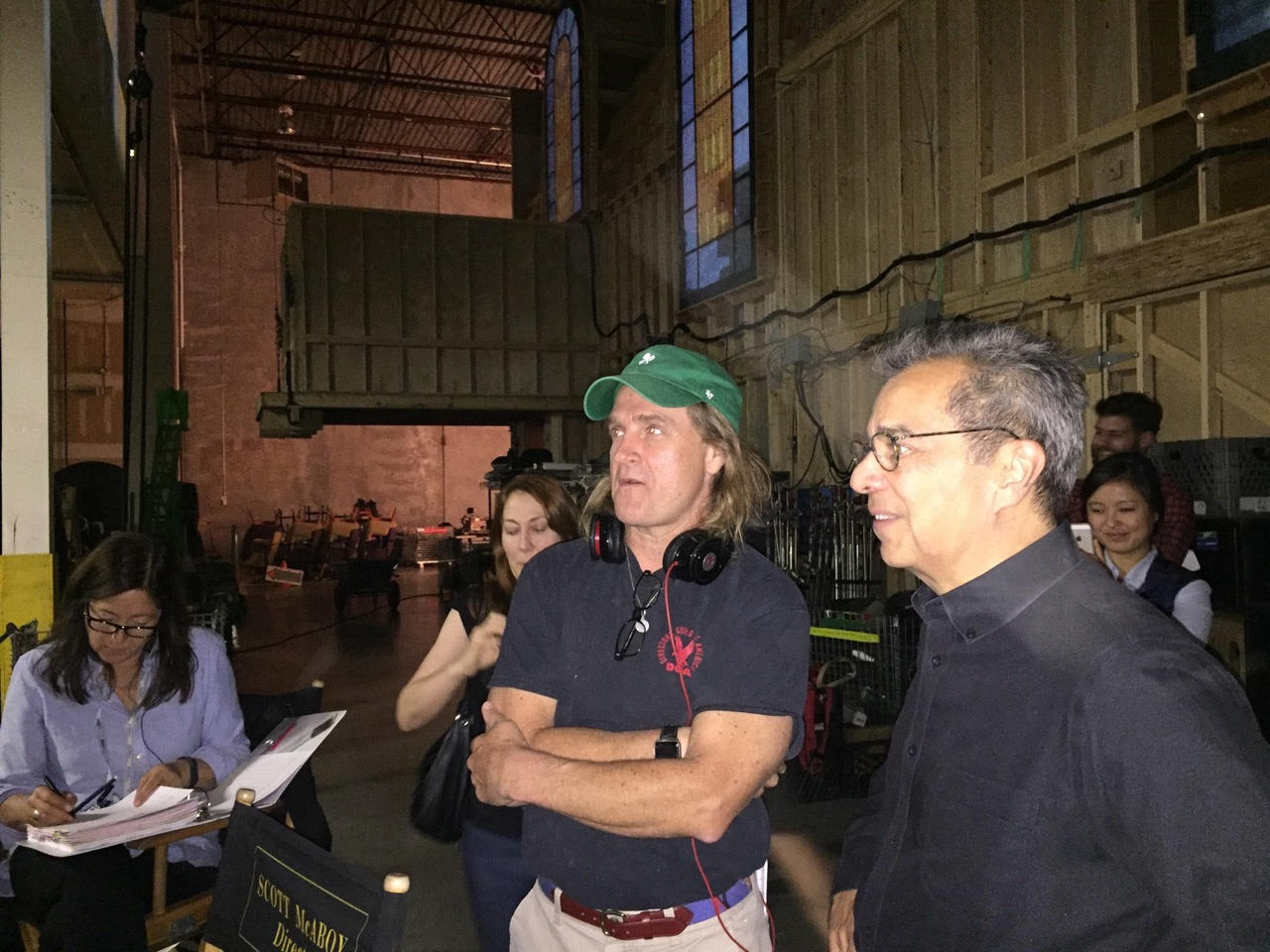
Director McAboy and writer Grabenstein

Escape from Mr. Lemoncello's Library was optioned by Nickelodeon as a movie filmed in Vancouver BC, Canada. The movie was released on October 9, 2017.

The film was directed by Scott McAboy Produced by Amy Sydorick and stars Casey Simpson as Kyle Keeley, Breanna Yde as Akimi, Klarke Pipkin as Sierra, A.J. Louis Rivera Jr. as Andrew Peckleman, Ty Nicolas Consiglio as Charles Chiltington, Russell Roberts as Mr. Lemoncello, Kari Wahlgren as the voice of Charlotte from Charlotte's Web, and Dana Snyder as the voice of the Troll from Three Billy Goats Gruff.

Awards
Preceded by Wonder	Mark Twain Award; 2016	Succeeded by The War That Saved My Life
