= Treasure Hunters: Peril at the Top of the World =

2016 novel by James Patterson

- Treasure Hunters: Peril at the Top of the World cover
- Author: James Patterson, Chris Grabenstein
- Cover artist: Juliana Neufeld
- Series: Treasure Hunters
- Genre: Fantasy, young-adult novel
- Published: 2016
- Publisher: Little, Brown and Company
- Publication place: United States
- Media type: Print (hardcover and paperback), audiobook, e-book
- Pages: 384 (hardcover)
- ISBN: 0316346934
- OCLC: 932173952
- Preceded by: Treasure Hunters: Secret of the Forbidden City
- Followed by: Quest for the city of gold

Treasure Hunters: Peril at the Top of the World is a young adult children's literature adventure fiction book written by James Patterson with Chris Grabenstein. It is the fourth book in the Treasure Hunters series and the sequel to Treasure Hunters: Secret of the Forbidden City. It was published in 2016.
