= The Doll in the Garden: A Ghost Story =

Book by Mary Downing Hahn

- First edition (publ. Clarion Books); Cover art by Alix Berenzy
- Author: Mary Downing Hahn
- Language: English
- Publisher: Clarion Books
- Publication date: 1989
- ISBN: 0-89919-848-1 (first edition)
- LC Class: PZ7.H1256 Do

The Doll in the Garden: A Ghost Story is a children's novel by Mary Downing Hahn. It was first published in 1989.

== Summary ==
Still angry over the recent death of her father, ten-year-old Ashley moves with her widowed mother into the upper floor of a boarding house owned by mean-spirited Ms. Cooper, who dislikes children. In spite of Ms. Cooper's warnings to stay out of the house's overgrown and neglected garden, Ashley goes exploring and meets a younger neighbor, Kristi. Kristi tells her the neighborhood kids believe the garden is haunted by a ghostly cat, and that they hear mysterious crying coming from the hedges. Later that night, Ashley also hears crying in the garden.

Ashley convinces Kristi to help her clean up the garden. While pulling weeds, Kristi uncovers a buried box containing an antique doll named Anna Maria, along with a handwritten apology from a girl named "Carrie" addressed to "Louisa." As the girls wonder who Carrie and Louisa might be, the white cat appears. The girls hear Ms. Cooper approach and quickly hide the doll, but Ms. Cooper, seeing the cat, is terrified. That night Ashley hears crying in the garden once more. Believing Anna Maria is crying from loneliness, she slips outside and takes the doll into the house, hiding her in a dresser. The crying ceases, and Ashley believes she has solved the mystery.

In the morning, Kristi and Ashley quarrel over which of them gets to keep Anna Maria, with Kristi claiming ownership because she discovered her and Ashley insisting that Anna Maria will cry again if taken out of the house. Kristi, believing Ashley made up the story as an excuse to keep the doll for herself, storms off in anger. The white cat reappears, and Ashley follows him through a hole in the hedge. On the other side, she meets a girl named Louisa who is dying of tuberculosis. Louisa shows Ashley her collection of dolls, but tells her that her favorite doll, Anna Maria, was stolen by a girl named Carrie. Ashley realizes that Anna Maria belongs to Louisa and promises to bring her back.

Upon arriving home, Ashley discovers that Kristi, still angry, has told Ms. Cooper about the doll. Ms. Cooper demands Ashley give her the doll. Ashley tries to explain that she promised to give the doll back to Louisa, but hearing the name only makes Ms. Cooper angrier. Ms. Cooper tells Ashley's mother that Ashley stole the doll from her private rooms. Though Ashley protests that she is not a thief, her mother makes her give Anna Maria to Ms. Cooper and scolds Ashley for stealing, while Ms. Cooper smirks in satisfaction. Even Kristi is upset by this unfair outcome.

Ashley forces Kristi to follow her through the hole in the hedge to explain to Louisa why they can no longer bring back her doll. The girls realize that the hole in the hedge is a gateway into the past and that Louisa's ghost will be trapped there until she gets her doll back. Ashley secretly hopes that if the doll is returned, history will be changed so that Louisa lives.

The two girls confront Ms. Cooper, telling her about Louisa's ghost. Realizing there is no other way the girls could know about Louisa and Anna Maria, Ms. Cooper confesses that she was the Carrie who stole Anna Maria from Louisa when they were girls. As a child, Ms. Cooper was poor and had few toys, but envied her wealthy friend's doll collection. Young Ms. Cooper borrowed Anna Maria without permission, intending to return her, but was unable to do so before Louisa died. Out of fear and guilt, she buried the doll in the garden. Now she believes Louisa sent the ghost of her cat as a sign she would never forgive her.

The girls explain Louisa only wants her doll back and convince Ms. Cooper to return it. They lead Ms. Cooper through the hedge, where she emerges as a little girl once more. She gives the doll to Louisa, who forgives her. When the three return to the garden, the now-adult Ms. Cooper thanks the girls for allowing her to reconcile with her long-lost friend. Ashley is devastated Louisa still died in spite of their efforts, but begins to understand that the grief she feels for Louisa is really her own unexpressed grief for her father, whose death she never fully accepted.

Ms. Cooper becomes much kinder, causing Ashley to believe that Louisa's real intention was not to get back her doll, but to free her friend from the guilt that made her so bitter. Ashley wonders if her dreams about her father are his way of telling her to let go of her own guilt at being unable to save him. While she still mourns her father's loss, she is no longer angry that he left her. As Ashley falls asleep, she hears a child laughing in the garden and knows Louisa is finally at peace.

== Reception ==
- It won a Children's Sequoyah Award.
- It won a Mark Twain Award.
- It won a William Allen White Children's Book Award.

Awards
Preceded by Beauty	Winner of the William Allen White Children's Book Award; 1992	Succeeded by Maniac Magee
Preceded by All About Sam	Mark Twain Award; 1992	Succeeded by Maniac Magee
