= Earthquake Terror =

1996 novel by Peg Kehret

- Author: Peg Kehret

Earthquake Terror is a 1996 novel by Peg Kehret. It tells the tale of how a boy named Jonathan has to help his partially paralyzed six-year-old sister Abby, during an earthquake while their parents are at a hospital.

== Reception ==
In his review for Childhood Education in 1997, J. Robert Dornish described the story as "absolutely riveting", noting that it is likely to affect the reader's reactions to news reports of earthquakes. In another review for the School Library Journal, MaryAnn Karre, reviewing the audiobook version released in 2012, noted that "youngsters may find it hard to comprehend how the family could be so out of touch, but Peg Kehret wrote this story [in 1998] before cell phones became a necessity."
