= Treasure Hunters: Danger Down the Nile =

2014 children's novel by James Patterson and Chris Grabenstein

- Treasure Hunters: Danger Down the Nile cover
- Author: James Patterson, Chris Grabenstein
- Cover artist: Juliana Neufeld
- Series: Treasure Hunters
- Genre: Fantasy, young-adult novel
- Published: 2014
- Publisher: Little, Brown and Company
- Publication place: United States
- Media type: Print (hardcover and paperback), audiobook, e-book
- Pages: 480 (hardcover)
- ISBN: 0316406015
- OCLC: 909288683
- LC Class: PZ7.P27653 Dal 2014
- Preceded by: Treasure Hunters
- Followed by: Treasure Hunters: Secret of the Forbidden City

Treasure Hunters: Danger Down the Nile is a children's adventure novel written by James Patterson with Chris Grabenstein. It is the second book in the Treasure Hunters series and the sequel to Treasure Hunters. It was published in 2014.

In this book, the Kidd siblings head on a quest to find the legendary mines of King Solomon and their parents. They navigate their way down the Nile, from hot and dusty Cairo in Egypt to deep dark jungles in Congo, passing some villains along the way. The story shows them using all their survival instincts to make it out alive.

== Reception ==
Kirkus Reviews gave the novel a starred review and writes that it "promises to be filled with more danger, more espionage, more plot twists and of course more snack cakes." They add, "It's hard to imagine the adventure-loving reader who wouldn't be hooked by this series."
