= The Toothpaste Millionaire =

1972 children's novel by Jean Merrill

- Cover of the first edition, illustrated by Jan Palmer
- Author: Jean Merrill
- Illustrator: Jan Palmer
- Set in: East Cleveland
- Publication date: 1972
- Pages: 89

The Toothpaste Millionaire is a children's novel by the American writer Jean Merrill, illustrated by Jan Palmer and first published by Houghton Mifflin in 1972. It is one of Merrill's most popular books. The story takes place in East Cleveland, Ohio and tells the tale of an ingenious adolescent who develops a less expensive brand of toothpaste and how he and his middle-school aged friends work together to form a successful company.

Merrill stated that Rufus was "her type of hero" not because he became rich but because he was smart and resourceful.

== Plot ==
The story is set in the city of East Cleveland, Ohio, where Rufus Mayflower, a sixth-grader, decides the price of the toothpaste his mother has sent him to purchase is too expensive. He decides to take matters into his own hands by first formulating and then starting a small business to produce and sell toothpaste at a more affordable price.

The entire book is narrated by Kate MacKinstrey, who has recently moved to the city from Connecticut, and makes friends with Rufus at the beginning of the school year. Together, Kate and Rufus experiment with various ingredients, mixing and testing until they create a toothpaste recipe that is not only effective but also economical. The duo sets up a small production operation in Rufus's basement and begins selling their toothpaste to friends, family, and eventually the entire town. Their endeavor expands as Rufus issues stock, finds a proper factory and hires an adult employee, named Hector, to help manage operations.

As their business, which they name "Toothpaste," gains national success, the young entrepreneurs face challenges from established toothpaste manufacturers who feel threatened by the competition. This leads to legal battles and moments of tension, including disaster when criminal elements detonate an explosive in the Toothpaste factory. Once Rufus has made his million, he retires from toothpaste manufacture, announcing he will spend the summer before his eighth grade year riding his bike to North Carolina to visit his grandmother.

The Toothpaste Millionaire is not just a tale of financial success but also a story of friendship, creativity, and determination. It highlights the potential of young minds to make a difference and challenge the status quo. The novel encourages readers to think critically about economic principles and also the pitfalls of consumerism.

== ABC After School Special ==
In 1974 The Toothpaste Millionaire was adapted into an ABC After School Special starring Tierre R. Turner as the 12 year-old inventor Rufus Mayflower. The script was adapted by Ronald Rubin and the film directed by Richard Kinon and the show was produced by The Great American Film Factory and Viacom. The adaptation was called "almost unrecognizable" by those who had favorably reviewed the book.

== Stage adaptation ==
On 18 May 2024, Talespinner Children's Theatre in Cleveland, Ohio debuted a 60-minute stage adaptation of The Toothpaste Millionaire. Adapted by David Hansen, this production was performed by a cast of six (3 men, 3 women) with most performers playing more than one role. The production was revived for the 2024 BorderLight Theatre Festival in July, 2024.

== Awards ==
1976: Dorothy Canfield Fisher Children's Book Award.
1977: Sequoyah Book Award Children's Award Winner
