= The Pushcart War =

1964 children's novel by Jean Merrill

- Cover of the first edition, illustrated by Ronni Solbert
- Author: Jean Merrill
- Illustrator: Ronni Solbert
- Set in: New York City
- Publication date: 1964
- Pages: 223

The Pushcart War is a popular children's novel by the American writer Jean Merrill, illustrated by Ronni Solbert and first published by W. R. Scott in 1964. It is Merrill's best-known work. The story is written in the style of a historical report from the future, looking back at the events of a "war" that occurred a decade earlier on the streets of New York City between trucking companies and pushcart owners who use pea shooters as weapons to disrupt the trucks.

== Development and publication history ==
Merrill said the idea for the novel brewed in her for several years while she lived in Greenwich Village. She said the truck traffic there was oppressive and she fantasized about flattening the tires out with pea shooters. She had an epiphany, realizing that "what you feel about the trucks is what everybody feels about bullies," and from there she began writing the novel.

Several characters were based on real-life friends and people. Solbert recalled that when she and Merrill were living in the East Village in the early 1960s on 10th Street near Tompkins Square Park, the New York City Parks Department proposed cutting down trees and removing tables used by neighborhood residents in favor of a Little League field. The novel was dedicated to Mary Nichols, a journalist for The Village Voice who led the Citizens Committee for the Preservation of Tompkins Square Park. Mayor Cudd was based on then-mayor Robert F. Wagner Jr., and a neighbor who repaired pushcarts, Mr. Ammerman, was immortalized as Maxie Hammerman, the Pushcart King.

=== Editions ===
The year in which the story takes place has been updated in editions of the book published after the first edition. The year in which the story is set is noted following the publication data.

- 1964, US, HarperCollins (no ISBN), pub date 1972, hardback (first edition). Story set in 1976.
- 1985, US, Harper & Row, pub date 1985, hardback. Story set in 1996.
- 1995, US, Yearling Books (ISBN 0-440-47147-8), pub date 2005 August 1995, paperback.
- 2014, US, The New York Review Children's Collection (ISBN 978-1-59017-819-5), hardback (50th Anniversary Edition). Story set in 2026.

The 50th Anniversary edition, published in 2014, was prompted by a request for republication, as the book had gone out of print by 2012. Because most prior editions were published in paperback, the original ink drawings by Solbert were re-photographed for the 50th Anniversary Edition.

== Plot ==
=== The big Three ===
The opening sentence of the first edition is "The Pushcart War started on the afternoon of March 15, 1976, when a truck ran down a pushcart belonging to a flower peddler." The prefatory material includes introductions by (the fictional) Professor Lyman Cumberly and the author, Jean Merrill, dated ten years after the opening sentence; later editions have changed the years so the dates would continue to be set in the future at the time of publication.

Traffic in New York City has become intolerable. Leaders of the three biggest trucking companies, collectively known as The Three, hold a secret meeting where they plan to take over the streets for themselves by eliminating other traffic, starting with the pushcarts. The Three are Moe Mammoth of Mammoth Moving, Walter Sweet of Tiger Trucking, and Louie Livergreen of LEMA (Lower Eastside Moving Association). Professor Cumberly says, "The truck drivers had gotten together and figured out that in crowded traffic conditions, the only way to get where you wanted was to be so big that you didn't have to get out of the way of anybody." This is known as the Large Object Theory of History.

=== The combatants ===
The biggest trucks operated by The Three are respectively the Mighty Mammoth (Mammoth Moving), the Ten-Ton Tiger (Tiger Trucking), and the Leaping Lema (LEMA). Their most prominent driver is Albert P. Mack, a foul-tempered driver operating a Mighty Mammoth. A driver for Tiger Trucking is Joey Kafflis, who is fired for agreeing with public sentiment, saying that traffic is lousy and that there are too many trucks.

Prominent peddlers are Frank the Flower, Morris the Florist, General Anna, Harry the Hot Dog, Mr. Jerusalem, Carlos, Papa Peretz, Eddie Moroney, and the pushcart repair shop owner, Maxie Hammerman, also known as the Pushcart King.

=== Pea-Shooter Campaign ===
The Three secretly declare war on the pushcarts, calling them obsolete; truck company-funded newspapers began to run editorials calling pushcarts a menace to the streets, poorly constructed and unsanitary. Truck drivers are given carte blanche to harass pushcart vendors, and the dramatic increase in pushcart "accidents" allows The Three to claim that pushcarts are the real cause of the traffic. Initially, the outlook is bad for the peddlers because the trucking companies have the newspapers and Mayor Emmett P. Cudd on their side. Beset by truck-related "accidental" incidents, damaged carts, and injured fellows, the pushcart peddlers realize they need to fight back. Their response is the Pea-Shooter Campaign, which aims to flatten truck tires using pea shooters with pins in the peas so that everyone can see the trucks are the cause of the traffic problems.

The peddlers start their campaign on the morning of March 23; within five minutes, 97 trucks are disabled with flat tires. By mid-afternoon, traffic has ground to a standstill. One peddler, Harry the Hot Dog, is so proficient that he has caused 23 flat tires just that morning; another, General Anna, despairs of her poor aim and begins placing pins by hand. Six days after the start of the campaign, traffic begins to move briskly again as more trucks are disabled and taken off the streets. Three days after that, another peddler, Frank the Flower, is arrested while shooting a tire; under interrogation, he falsely confesses that he shot all 18,991 of the truck tires (to date), counting by thousands in the style of The Brave Little Tailor, to prevent other peddlers from being arrested. After his arrest, the peddlers gave up the Pea-Shooter Campaign.

But soon, inspired by Frank's arrest, children join in the sabotage of truck tires. As there are far more children than pushcart peddlers, even more trucks are disabled. In response, Mayor Cudd imposes a Tacks Tax to discourage the purchase of tacks, but the unpopular tax is promptly repealed under federal pressure; with that option taken away, the Mayor then shuts down all dried pea distribution. During a raid on Posey's Peas, the Police Chief notices an invoice to celebrity film star Wenda Gambling for a ton of peas; because they were delivered to Maxie Hammerman's shop, who he knows is the Pushcart King, the Chief arrests Hammerman.

=== Resolution ===
Hammerman is questioned by the Chief, but he gives plausible excuses for the evidence seized from his shop and is released. The Three realize the pushcarts are not easy targets, and make plans to kidnap Hammerman, but their plans are overheard and leaked inadvertently by a janitor practicing shorthand lessons as homework. Hammerman outwits The Three by inviting the Police Commissioner for a friendly game of poker (and as protection) the night of the planned kidnap. Hammerman, being aware of their plans, unnerves The Three; they play badly and lose a substantial sum of money.

The citizens of New York City, including Gambling, and the members of the press, eventually move to the side of the street vendors after the peddlers' Peace March is interrupted by violence from truck drivers led by Mack. On July 4, Big Moe calls Mayor Cudd, seeking peace with Hammerman. The next day, during a celebration which later would be called the Battle of Bleecker Street, citizens spontaneously hurl rotten fruits and vegetables at trucks in celebration.

At the peace conference on July 13, new laws were enacted to limit the size of the trucks to the current smallest size or smaller and to limit the number of trucks to one-half of the current number, in what is known as the Flower Formula. The conference includes drafting the Courtesy Act, which passes the City Council a week later, making it a criminal offense for a larger vehicle to take advantage of a smaller vehicle in any way.

After the war, Albert P. Mack was sentenced to life in prison for violating the Courtesy Act nineteen times. Wenda Gambling stars as Wenda Gambling in a movie documenting the Pushcart War, and later marries Joey Kafflis, whose diary was used during the film's production. The city erects a statue of General Anna in Tompkins Square Park to commemorate the struggle.

== Critical reaction and awards ==
The New York Times reviewed the novel in 1964 as "utterly captivating", praising it as "a book for young people with both a point of view and a sense of the ridiculous." Polly Goodwin, writing in the Chicago Tribune, called it "wonderfully funny and witty". Merrill won a Fulbright Fellowship in 1965 for the novel, which also won the Lewis Carroll Shelf Award (1964) and was a Horn Book Fanfare Best Book (1965).

Upon its initial publication in the United Kingdom in 1973, the Times Literary Supplement praised the story's continued relevance. In 2000, School Library Journal named it to its list of "One Hundred Books that Shaped the Century".

Lin-Manuel Miranda reviewed the book in 1988 for his third-grade class, recommending it "if you like excitement and comedy all in one". Author Adam Mansbach, who first read the novel at 9 years old, called it a story "full of unexpected reversals and understated witticisms" in 2013. When the 50th Anniversary edition was published in 2014, Alyssa Rosenberg called it "an argument for staying hopeful about the possibility of bringing about change, even when you are going up against entrenched and powerful interests" and compared it to A Canticle for Leibowitz in The Washington Post.

== Adaptations ==
=== School use ===
An excerpt from this book, titled "The Peashooter Campaign" is part of the textbook Galaxies (Houghton Mifflin Company: Boston, 1971, 1974)

=== Performing arts ===
In 1980, the novel was adapted for the stage by Gregory Falls for the Young ACT Company in Seattle. Ela Bhatt wrote to Merrill in 1997, requesting permission to stage an adaptation in Bhopal, India on behalf of the Self Employed Women's Association (SEWA). In 2006, a musical adaptation was presented by Edric Haleen in Holt, Michigan, which Merrill praised for its faithfulness.

Multiple attempts have been made to develop a film from the novel; Universal City Studios purchased the rights and in 1968 announced they were developing a musical to be written by Michael McWhinney, Jerry Powell, and Treva Silverman. Additional projects were announced in 1972, by publicist Larry Belling for an animated film using a script by Stan G. Spiegelman, and in 2002, for Jane Startz Productions, adapted by Soman Chainani. As of 2014, additional screenplays based on the novel have been started by Tony Kushner and Mansbach, but no film has been made. Kushner's completed screenplay is held at the Columbia University Libraries, with a note "for Jonathan Demme".
