= Barbara Williams (writer) =

American author

- Born: January 1, 1925; Salt Lake City, Utah, United States
- Died: 2013 (aged 88); Salt Lake City, Utah, United States
- Occupation: Novelist
- Writing career
- Genre: Children's novels
- Notable work: Titanic Crossing

Barbara Williams (1925–2013) was an American author of children's books. She is most known for her coming of age story Titanic Crossing, which became a best-seller and won a Mark Twain Readers Award in 1998.

== Early life ==
Barbara Williams was born January 1, 1925, in Salt Lake City, Utah, daughter of Walter Wright. Williams began writing when she was five years old, when she was encouraged by her teachers to act as the classroom reporter for the children's page of a local newspaper, which she kept writing for until she became the editor for that same page at the seventh grade. She sold her first story, to the Salt Lake Tribune, when she was twelve years old.

She graduated from East High School in 1942, and finished her course on the University of Utah in 1946, after which she married J. D. Williams. The couple moved to Washington, D.C., on the same year, where Williams worked at the Library of Congress. Six years later, in 1952, they moved back to Salt Lake City, where her husband founded the Hinckley Institute of Politics. After moving back to her home town, she worked as a teacher in the University of Utah for twelve years.

== Career as a writer ==
While in high school, Barbara met Emma Lou Thayne, with whom she would become friends. In 1952, the two created a group with six other promising writers from Salt Lake City, which remained active for 16 years. Williams also considered Thayne to be her "spiritual mentor".

Williams had her first book published in 1965, Let's Go to an Indian Cliff Dwelling. Although she preferred writing fiction, most of her initial works are nonfiction. By 1983, she had already written almost thirty different works, with twelve of those being children's picture books.

Her most successful work was Titanic Crossing, which sold over a million copies and, at the time, appeared as No. 3 on Publishers Weekly Fiction Bestsellers List.

== Personal life and death ==
Williams had four children with her husband, J. D. Williams, who died in 2007. Barbara died in Salt Lake City, in 2013.

== Selected works ==
Williams wrote a total of 52 books during her lifetime, which included nonfiction, picture books and young adult novels.

- Williams, Barbara (1965). Let's go to an Indian cliff dwelling (1st ed.). Putnam.
- Williams, Barbara (1974). Albert's Impossible Toothache. Walker. ISBN 978-1-84428-165-7.
- Williams, Barbara (1976). Someday, Said Mitchell. Dutton. ISBN 978-0-525-39580-5.
- Williams, Barbara (1979). Where are You, Angela Von Hauptmann, Now that I Need You?. Holt, Rinehart, and Winston. ISBN 978-0-03-050606-2.
- Williams, Barbara (1979). Breakthrough: Women in Politics. St Martins Press. ISBN 978-0-8027-6366-2.
- Williams, Barbara (1997). Titanic Crossing. Scholastic Inc. ISBN 978-0-590-94464-9.
