= Abduction! =

Book by Peg Kehret

- First edition cover
- Author: Peg Kehret
- Language: English
- Genre: Mystery
- Publisher: Dutton Juvenile
- Publication date: November 2004
- Publication place: USA
- Media type: Print (Hardcover)
- Pages: 192
- ISBN: 978-0-14-240617-5

Abduction! by Peg Kehret, is a novel about a 13-year-old girl named Bonnie who searches for her brother Matt and their dog Pookie who were both abducted. Her abductor, a mystery at first, ends up being someone much close to home.

== Plot summary ==
Matt, a six-year old boy, is kidnapped by his father, Denny, whom he had never met. Though he has always dreamed of meeting him, nothing is the way he thought it would be, given his father is only using Matt to impress his sister who often brags about her two well-raised sons. Denny has also taken Matt's dog, Pookie, and then dropped him off in a park. With few clues to follow, Matt's mother, sister, and the police, are doing everything they can to find him. Some old folks found Pookie and later gave him back to Matt's mom and sister. Matt's sister, Bonnie, sees Matt at a Mariner's baseball game, but is caught by Denny. Now both captive, the siblings attempt to escape. On the ferry, Bonnie signals to Matt to throw his hardest pitch. The baseball hits Denny, which allows the two to escape. Denny is arrested, and the children return home safely.

== Awards ==
In 2007, Abduction! was awarded the Mark Twain Award by the Missouri Association of School Librarians.
