= Baby-Sitting Is a Dangerous Job =

1985 novel by Willo Davis Roberts

- 1987 edition
- Author: Willo Davis Roberts
- Language: English
- Genre: Children's novel
- Publisher: Macmillan Publishing Company (USA)
- Publication date: 1985
- Publication place: United States
- Media type: Print
- Pages: 161 pp
- ISBN: 0-689-31100-1 (USA)

Baby-Sitting Is a Dangerous Job is a children's suspense novel by American author Willo Davis Roberts. It was first published in 1985.

== Plot summary ==
Babysitter Darcy Ann Stevens gets a summer job babysitting three children from the rich Foster family. But the second day that Darcy babysits, they are kidnapped and driven to an old house. No one knows where they are, and the kidnappers are demanding ransom from the Foster parents to let them go. Darcy and the children have to outwit the kidnappers to escape.
