= The Old Willis Place =

Book by Mary Downing Hahn

- First edition
- Author: Mary Downing Hahn
- Original title: The Old Willis Place : A Ghost Story
- Cover artist: Ericka O'Rourke
- Language: English
- Genre: Horror/Ghost Story/Mystery
- Publisher: Clarion Books
- Publication date: 20 September 2004
- Media type: Paperback, Hardcover

The Old Willis Place: A Ghost Story is a children's novel written by Mary Downing Hahn. It was first published in 2004 and is found in 9,001 libraries.

== Synopsis ==
Diana and her younger brother Georgie live in the woods near Oak Hill Manor, known locally as the Old Willis Place after its last inhabitant, a cruel old woman named Lilian Willis. Diana and Georgie have many rules they must follow, including never going beyond the property's boundaries, never speaking to anyone, and never allowing themselves to be seen. The county hires caretakers to live in a mobile home on the Willis property; however, Diana and Georgie always manage to drive them away with their childish pranks.

Diana is excited to see that the latest caretaker has a daughter named Lissa, a lonely, imaginative girl whose mother died when she was five. Diana imagines becoming friends with Lissa, even though the rules forbid it. Soon after her arrival, Lissa goes exploring and is the verge of entering the house when Diana steps out of the woods to stop her. Diana is so filthy and ragged that Lissa mistakes her for a monster and flees.

Upset by Lissa's reaction, Diana writes an apology for frightening Lissa and asks if they can be friends. Lissa confides that she plans to sneak into the house and explore while her father is away, inviting Diana to go with her. Diana is wary, as entering the house is against the rules, but she is so desperate to have Lissa for a friend that she agrees. The following day, Diana and Lissa enter the Old Willis Place, where Lissa feels compelled to see the locked parlor where Lilian Willis died. In spite of Diana's attempts to stop her, she opens the parlor door, freeing Miss Lilian's malevolent spirit.

Knowing that Miss Lilian will come after them, Diana and Georgie finally admit to Lissa that they themselves are ghosts. Sixty years ago, Miss Lilian caught them playing in her cellar and locked them in as punishment, intending to free them later that day when their parents returned. Before she could do so, Miss Lilian suffered a stroke and was taken to hospital, leaving the children trapped. Paralyzed by the stroke, Miss Lilian was unable to tell anyone what she had done, and by the time she recovered, several weeks had passed and the children had starved to death. Miss Lilian left the bodies hidden in the cellar and pretended to have no knowledge of what became of the missing children. For decades afterwards, the children's ghosts tormented Miss Lilian until she, too, died and became a ghost who pursued and tormented the children who once tormented her. The children managed to trap her ghost in the parlor and made strict rules to prevent her from ever being freed.

Lissa tells her father to search the cellar, where he finds Diana and Georgie's bodies. The bodies are at last given proper burials, while Diana and Georgie wonder what will become of them now. They are soon found by Miss Lilian, who wants to punish them for revealing her secret. Diana realizes that all of them are bound to the Old Willis Place by the terrible grudges they hold for things that happened long ago and that unless they can forgive one another, none of them will ever leave. The children forgive Miss Lilian for leaving them to die and apologize for tormenting her in her final years, while Miss Lilian, in turn, expresses remorse for her role in the children's deaths. A beautiful silver light descends, and from it, the ghosts of the children's parents arrive to take them to the afterlife. The children's forgiveness allows Miss Lilian to join them there.

Lissa, witnessing the whole scene in secret, is happy for her friends and takes comfort in the idea that her mother also resides within the beautiful light, waiting to reunite with Lissa once again.
