= Stolen Children (book) =

2008 novel by Peg Kehret

- Author: Peg Kehret
- Language: English
- Genre: Suspense
- Publisher: Dutton Children's Books
- Publication date: 2008
- Publication place: United States
- Media type: Print
- Pages: 208
- ISBN: 9780525478355

Stolen Children, by American writer Peg Kehret, is a 2008 novel for young adults. In the book, a 14-year-old girl who's just finished a babysitting course and the baby she was hired to take care of are kidnapped.

== Plot summary ==
Amy is a 14-year-old who has just lost her father and, after finishing her babysitting course, is hired to take care of a 3-year-old baby girl from a wealthy family. After beginning her new job, the girls are kidnapped and offered for ransom by two criminals. While recording the tapes they plan to deliver to the baby's parents, Amy sends coded messages through the recordings to help the parents figure out where they are being held.

== Reception ==
Stolen Children received generally positive reviews. Kirkus Reviews called it a "sure hit for the intended audience", while Andrew Medlar, writing for The Booklist, praised the story's consistent pace and drama, as well as noting that, at no point, physical violence is depicted in the book.

The book was highlighted in the 2009 Children's Choices – a list of book recommendation for children and young adults – where it was praised for its enticing plot and for possibly encouraging readers to try babysitting classes.

In 2010, Stolen Children was one of the three winners of the "Charlotte Award", which is sponsored by the New York State Reading Association. In 2011, Kehret was the recipient of her third Mark Twain Readers Award for Stolen Children.
