= The Crossroads (novel) =

Children's novel by author Chris Grabenstein

- Author: Chris Grabenstein
- Original title: The Crossroads
- Illustrator: Tim Boowop
- Language: English
- Genre: Children's, thriller
- Publisher: Random House
- Publication place: United States
- Media type: Print (hardback)
- Pages: 323 pp (325 including prologue)
- Followed by: The Hanging Hill

The Crossroads is the first children's novel by author Chris Grabenstein.

== Plot summary ==
Zack Jennings, his dad, and his new stepmother Judy have just moved back to his father’s hometown, in Connecticut, not knowing that their new house has a dark history. Fifty years ago, a crazed killer caused an accident at the nearby crossroads that took 40 innocent lives. He died when his car hit a tree, which is in Zack's backyard. Since then, his malevolent spirit has inhabited the tree. During a huge storm, a lightning hits the tree, releasing the spirit, and the spirit began looking for the descendants of those who cost him his life, starting with Zack, whose grandfather started it all.

== Audio ==
An audiobook of the novel has been released, read by J.J. Myers; wife of the author. It was officially sold in America on May 27, 2008. J. J. Myers won a "Headphones award" from AudioFile magazine for her performance of the book.

== Reception ==
Connie Fletcher in her review for Booklist said that the book was "An absorbing psychological thriller, as well as a rip-roaring ghost story, this switches points of view among humans, trees, and ghosts with astonishing élan". Kirkus Reviews described it as having "brief, fast-paced action chapters, tight plotting, several murders and a sympathetic main character keep things moving, as long-buried clues to the mystery of a tragic accident are revealed with some help from kindly phantoms. One friendly ghost in particular may come as a surprise. Fans of the genre won't mind some of the implausibilities; they'll keep reading". Jessica Miller in her review for School Library Journal said that "this riveting tale is written in short, easy-to-read chapters, making it a good choice for reluctant readers. Throughout the story, the main characters grow closer to one another and gain heroic traits while the "bad guys" reveal greater depths of wickedness and insanity. Readers will relate to Zack and enjoy the book's scare factor and adventure."

== Sequels ==
Three books, The Hanging Hill, The Smoky Corridor, and The Black Heart Crypt were written by Chris Grabenstein as sequels to this book.
