= Jean Merrill =

American children's writer

- Born: January 27, 1923; Rochester, New York, U.S.
- Died: August 2, 2012 (aged 89); Randolph, Vermont
- Occupation: Writer, editor
- Genre: Children's novels

Jean Merrill (January 27, 1923 – August 2, 2012) was an American writer of children's books and editor, known best for The Pushcart War, a novel published in 1964. She died from cancer at her home in Randolph, Vermont, in 2012, aged 89.

== Early life and personal life ==
Merrill was born on January 27, 1923, in Rochester, New York, to Earl and Elsie Almetta Merrill. She grew up on the shores of Lake Ontario in Webster, New York (now a suburb of Rochester). Merrill received her Bachelor of Arts degree in English and Theatre in 1944 from Allegheny College in Meadville, Pennsylvania and was inducted into the Phi Beta Kappa Society. She received her master's degree from Wellesley College in 1945. Ronni Solbert was her illustrator and companion for almost 50 years.

== Editor ==
After leaving Wellesley, Merrill was an editor for Scholastic Magazines from 1945 to 1949. She subsequently edited at Literary Cavalcade from 1950 to 1957. Starting in 1952, Merrill held a Fulbright Fellowship at the University of Madras in India. Her folklore studies in India would lead her to write a number of stories based on Asian folklore: Shan's Lucky Knife (1960, based on a Burmese folktale), The Superlative Horse (1961, based on a Chinese folktale), and The Girl Who Loved Caterpillars (1992, based on a Japanese tale). From 1965 to 1971, Merrill worked as an editor and consultant at the Publications Division of the Bank Street College of Education.

== Writer ==
Merrill started writing books while working at Literary Cavalcade, including Henry, The Hand-Painted Mouse (1951) and The Woover (1952). Merrill received the Lewis Carroll Shelf Award in 1963 for The Superlative Horse.

In 1964, Merrill published her best-known work, The Pushcart War, for which she won her second Lewis Carroll Shelf Award, in 1965. Set in New York, the book was written in the style of a historical report from the future, looking back at earlier events from a class warfare struggle between trucking companies and pushcart owners. Alberta Eiseman of The New York Times wrote that "it's rare to find a book for young people with both a point of view and a sense of the ridiculous." The book has been reissued a number of times, with the dates adjusted to keep it set in the future. In 2006, a musical adaptation was presented by Edric Haleen in Holt, Michigan.

Merrill published The Black Sheep in 1969. In The New York Times Book Review, Natalie Babbitt wrote that "her fable is a satisfying sandwich in which the peanut butter, sticky and nourishing, slides down with ease due to judicious use of jelly." This was followed in 1972 by The Toothpaste Millionaire. Set in East Cleveland, the story relates how a Caucasian sixth-grader girl who just moved into town becomes friends with her neighbor and classmate, an African-American boy entrepreneur, and becomes rich by selling their home-made toothpaste. In 1974, an ABC afternoon special was based on The Toothpaste Millionaire. The Toothpaste Millionaire has been used in the classroom to integrate lessons from a number of different subject areas: entrepreneurship, marketing, manufacturing of toothpaste, and the social issues associated with race in the story's setting.

In 1992, Merrill published The Girl Who Loved Caterpillars, based on a 12th-century Japanese tale. True to the original manuscript, whose ending had been lost, the story ends abruptly.

Books had a great impact on Merrill as a child, which motivated her to try to write children's stories that would have a similar effect. Her books often illustrate universal human values serving to resolve conflict.

Most of her books were illustrated by her partner of over 50 years, Ronni Solbert.

== Bibliography ==
- Henry, The Hand-Painted Mouse. New York: Coward-McCann, 1951.
- The Woover. New York: Coward-McCann, 1952.
- Boxes. New York: Coward-McCann, 1953.
- Shan's Lucky Knife: A Burmese Folk Tale. New York: W.R. Scott, 1960.
- The Superlative Horse: A Tale of Ancient China. New York: W.R. Scott, 1961.
- The Pushcart War New York: W.R. Scott, 1964.
- The Travels of Marco. New York: Knopf Books for Younger Readers, 1965
- The Elephant Who Liked to Smash Small Cars. New York: Pantheon, 1967.
- The Black Sheep. New York: Pantheon, 1969.
- The Toothpaste Millionaire Boston: Houghton Mifflin, 1972.
- The Bumper Sticker Book Chicago: A. Whitman, 1973.
- Maria's House New York: Atheneum, 1974.
- The Girl who Loved Caterpillars: A Twelfth-Century Tale from Japan. New York: HarperCollins, 1992.
