= Closed for the Season (novel) =

2009 book by Mary Downing Hahn

- First edition
- Author: Mary Downing Hahn
- Genre: Fiction
- Published: 2009
- Publisher: Clarion Books
- Pages: 192
- Awards: Edgar Award for Best Juvenile (2010)
- ISBN: 978-0-547-08451-0
- Website: Closed for the Season

Closed for the Season is a mystery novel written by Mary Downing Hahn and published by Clarion Books on June 15, 2009, which later went on to win the Edgar Award for Best Juvenile in 2010.
