= Tilt-a-Whirl (novel) =

Novel by Chris Grabenstein

- Author: Chris Grabenstein
- Genre: Mystery fiction, Thriller
- Published: 2005
- Publisher: Carroll & Graf
- Pages: 321
- Awards: Anthony Award for Best First Mystery (2006)
- ISBN: 978-0-786-71781-1
- Website: Tilt-a-Whirl

Tilt-a-Whirl is a book written by Chris Grabenstein and published by Carroll & Graf on 20 September 2005, which later went on to win the Anthony Award for Best First Mystery in 2006.
