= Mark Shulman (author) =

American children's author

- Born: April 1, 1962 (age 64); Rochester, New York, U.S.
- Education: University of Colorado at Boulder; Harvard Graduate School of Education
- Occupation: Writer of children's books
- Awards: Freeman Book Award (2019)

Mark Shulman (born April 1, 1962, in Rochester, New York) is an American children's author who has written more than 200 books. He is the founder of Oomf, Inc., a book production company.

Shulman lives with his family in New York City.

== Awards and honors ==
Awards for Shulman's writing
Year	Title	Award	Result	Ref.
2010	Scrawl	Cybils Award for Young Adult Fiction	Finalist	
2011	Scrawl	ALA Best Fiction for Young Adults	Selection	
2011	Scrawl	Quick Picks for Reluctant Young Adult Readers	Selection	
