= Wait Till Helen Comes =

1986 young adult novel by Mary Downing Hahn

- First edition
- Author: Mary Downing Hahn
- Language: English
- Genre: Fiction
- Published: 1986, Clarion Books
- Publication place: United States
- Media type: Print
- Pages: 184 pages
- ISBN: 0-89919-453-2

Wait Till Helen Comes is a 1986 novel by American author Mary Downing Hahn. It was first published on January 1, 1986, through HarperCollins and has since gone through several reprints. The book won a 1989 Young Reader's Choice Award and follows a young girl who must deal with supernatural events that surround her. The book deals with the subjects of death and suicide, which has led some parents to request that the book be removed from school reading lists and school libraries.

== Plot ==
The narrator, a timid twelve-year-old girl named Molly, is disappointed when her mother Jean and stepfather Dave decide to move their family to a renovated church in rural Maryland. To their displeasure, Molly and her ten-year-old brother Michael are expected to look after their seven-year-old stepsister Heather while their parents are working; however, Heather, whose mother died in a fire four years earlier, frequently evades the siblings and lies to Dave about them mistreating her.

The church adjoins a disused cemetery, in which the children find a tombstone bearing the initials HEH and the dates 1879–1886. Heather visits the grave frequently, and Molly hears her speak to someone called Helen when she appears to be alone. Shortly afterward, Molly finds Heather at the nearby ruins of a burned-out house, wearing a locket engraved with the same initials. Heather tells Molly and Michael that HEH stands for Helen Elizabeth Harper, a new friend of hers who will make them regret their dislike of her.

Michael and Molly learn that the ruined building, called Harper House by locals, was destroyed a hundred years earlier by a fire which killed two adults, Mabel and Robert; their seven-year-old daughter Helen escaped only to drown in the pond behind the house. Helen was buried in the cemetery, but the adults’ remains were never recovered. Since then, multiple children have died in the same pond.

The relationships between Dave, Jean, and the children grow strained. One night, Molly follows Heather outside and sees her speaking to the ghostly figure of a young girl. The next day, Molly’s, Michael’s, and Jean’s belongings are mysteriously vandalized and destroyed.

Molly goes to Harper House to find Helen’s ghost luring Heather into the pond. Molly rescues Heather, ripping the locket from her neck. When the pair take shelter from the rain in the ruins of the house, the floor collapses, and they find the skeletons of Robert and Mabel in the cellar. Heather confesses that she felt only Helen could understand her, because both of them accidentally started the fires that killed their respective parents. Helen, wracked by guilt and loneliness, enticed the other children to drown themselves so she would have a companion in death, but none of them ever “stayed”. Molly assures Heather that neither she nor Helen is to blame for the fires, enabling Helen to put aside her shame and join her parents in the afterlife.

Subsequently, Robert and Mabel’s remains are taken from the house and interred in the graveyard beside Helen. The children find the locket draped over Helen’s new tombstone, containing a slip of paper bearing the message, “With love from Helen. Please do not forget me.”

== Adaptations ==
On 28 August 2014, actress Sophie Nélisse stated on her Twitter account that she would act in a film adaptation of the book as Molly. She also stated that her sister would act in the film as well. On 12 September 2014, Variety announced that financing and cast were in place and principal photography would commence on the production of a film adaptation of Wait Till Helen Comes. The work would be directed by Dominic James, and would star Maria Bello and the Nélisse sisters. Production was slated to begin later that same month. Principal photography began on 28 September 2014 in Winnipeg, Manitoba. Author Mary Downing Hahn appears in the film in a speaking role, mentioning to one of the producers that as a little girl she had always wanted to be an actress in movies. This is the first of her books to be adapted into a feature film. The movie was released in November 2016.

The book was adapted into a graphic novel by Scott Peterson, Meredith Laxton, and Russ Badgett, published in September 2022.

== Reception ==
Kirkus Reviews praised the book but commented that it would be a more appealing read for "children comfortable with the genre" as the material in the book was "serious and chilling". Vice reviewed the book from an adult's perspective, stating that while the book's resolution would make sense to a younger reader, they did not believe that the issues would be easily solved by talking to the adults, as they believed that Heather's troubles did not solely stem from her keeping a secret.

=== Awards ===
- Golden Sower Award (1995, won)
- Iowa Children's Choice Award
- Maud Hart Lovelace Award
- Rebecca Caudhill Young Readers' Book Award
- Texas Bluebonnet Award
- Pacific Northwest Young Reader's Choice Award
- Young Hoosier Award
- Virginia Readers' Choice Award
- Volunteer State Book Award
- Dorothy Canfield Fisher Award
- Utah Children's Book Award
