= Chris Grabenstein =

American author

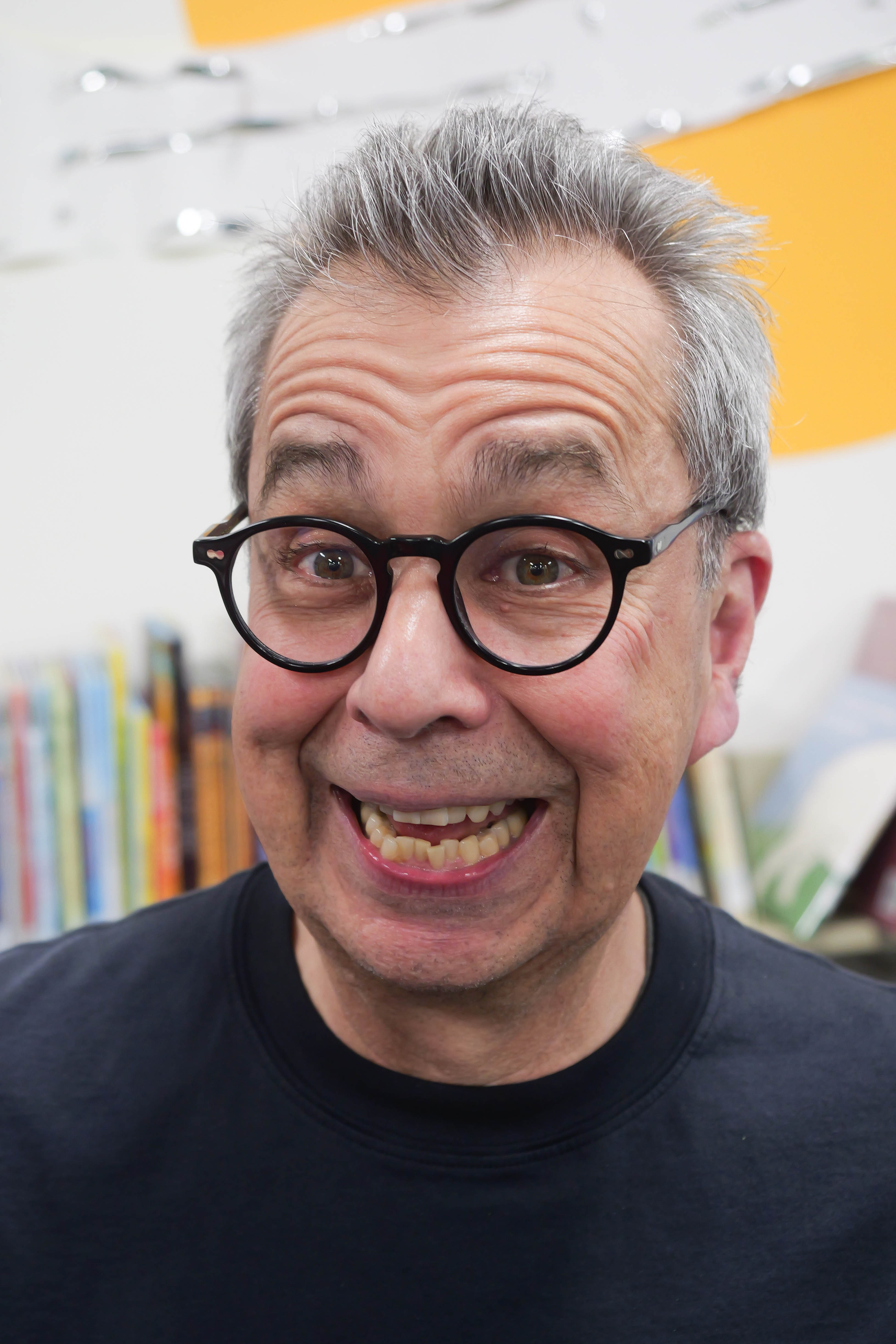
- At the Marion Public Library, April 2022
- Born: Buffalo, New York, U.S.
- Occupation: Writer
- Spouse: J.J. Grabenstein
- Writing career
- Period: 2005–present
- Genres: Children's, Mystery
- Website: www.chrisgrabenstein.com

Christopher Grabenstein is an American author. He published his first novel in 2005. Since then he has written novels for both adults and children, the latter often with frequent collaborator James Patterson. He graduated from the University of Tennessee in 1977 with a degree from the College of Communication and Information.

== Awards ==
In 2005, Grabenstein's debut novel was the first in the adult Ceepack Mysteries series, Tilt-a-Whirl, called an "entertaining debut" by The New York Times and given a Library Journal starred review. He has subsequently written more books in this series, called a "mash-up of Jersey Shore, Big Brother, and Survivor."

Grabenstein has also written many novels for children, including the Agatha and Anthony award-winning Haunted Mysteries series and the New York Times bestselling Escape from Mr. Lemoncello's Library. He has also co-authored a number of books with author James Patterson, for whom he previously worked when he was in advertising.

== Bibliography ==
=== The John Ceepak mysteries ===
1. Tilt-a-Whirl (2005)
2. Mad Mouse (2006)
3. Whack A Mole (2007)
4. Hell Hole (2008)
5. Mind Scrambler (2009)
6. "Ring Toss" (A Ceepak Short Story) (2010)
7. Rolling Thunder (2010)
8. Fun House (2012)
9. Free Fall (2013)

=== Christopher Miller Holiday thrillers ===
1. Slay Ride (2006)
2. Hell for the Holidays (2007)

=== Anthologies ===
- The Boys Go Fishing (Aug 2010) in Death's Excellent Vacation
- The Unknown Patriot (2018) in Scream and Scream Again

=== Books for children ===
==== The Haunted mysteries ====
- The Crossroads (2008)
- The Hanging Hill (2009) which is now The Demons Door (2017)
- The Smoky Corridor (2010) which is now The Zombie Awakening (2017)
- The Black Heart Crypt (2011)

==== Riley Mack ====
- Riley Mack and the Other Known Troublemakers (2012)
- Riley Mack Stirs Up More Trouble (2013)

==== Mr. Lemoncello ====
- Escape from Mr. Lemoncello's Library (2013)
- Mr. Lemoncello's Library Olympics (2016)
- Mr. Lemoncello's Great Library Race (2017)
- Mr. Lemoncello's All-Star Breakout Game (2019)
- Mr. Lemoncello and the Titanium Ticket (2020)
- Mr. Lemoncello's Very First Game (2022)
- Mr. Lemoncello's Fantabulous Finale (2024)
- Mr. Lemoncello's Wondermous Christmas Gift (2026)

==== Daniel X ====
- Daniel X: Armageddon (2012)
- Daniel X: Lights Out (2015)

==== I Funny ====
- I Funny (2012)
- I Even Funnier (2013)
- I Totally Funniest (2015)
- I Funny TV (2016)
- I Funny School of Laughs (2017)

==== Treasure Hunters ====
- Treasure Hunters (2013)
- Treasure Hunters: Danger Down the Nile (2014)
- Treasure Hunters: Secret of the Forbidden City (2015)
- Treasure Hunters: Peril at the Top of the World (2016)

==== House of Robots ====
- House of Robots (2014)
- House Of Robots: Robots Go Wild (2015)
- House Of Robots: Robot Revolution (2017)

==== Wonderland ====
- Welcome to Wonderland: Home Sweet Motel (2016)
- Welcome to Wonderland: Beach Party Surf Monkey (2017)
- Welcome to Wonderland: Sandapalooza Shake-Up (2018) with James Patterson

==== Jacky Ha-Ha ====
- Jacky Ha-Ha (2016)
- Jacky Ha Ha: My Life Is A Joke (2017)

==== Others ====
- The Explorer's Gate (2012)
- Don't Call Me Christina Kringle (2013)
- The Island of Dr. Libris (2015)
- Word of Mouse (2016)
- Laugh Out Loud (2017)
- Pottymouth and Stoopid (2017)
- Max Einstein: The Genius Experiment (2018) with James Patterson
- The Smartest Kid in the Universe (2020)
- The Smartest Kid in the Universe: Genius Camp (2021)
- The Smartest Kid in the Universe: Evil Genius (2023)
