= Mary Downing Hahn =

American children's writer

- Born: December 9, 1937 (age 88); Washington, D.C. (or College Park, Maryland, sources vary), U.S.
- Occupation: Novelist
- Writing career
- Period: 1979- Present
- Genres: Young adult fiction including ghost, horror, mystery stories
- Notable works: Stepping on the Cracks, Wait Till Helen Comes

Mary Downing Hahn (born December 9, 1937) is an American writer of young adult novels and a former school librarian. Popular for her ghost and mystery novels, Hahn is known for novels such as Stepping On The Cracks and Wait Till Helen Comes. Since publishing her first book in 1979, Hahn has written over 30 novels. Her latest novel, What We Saw, was published in September 2022.

== Early life ==
Mary Downing Hahn grew up in College Park, Maryland. As a child, she played with other neighborhood kids, engaging in games like “Kick the Can” and “Mother, May I,” as well as cowboy and outlaw games. In elementary school, Hahn was known as the class artist. She preferred to read and draw rather than write reports. From a young age, Hahn had begun writing and telling stories using pictures and drawings. As she reached junior high, Hahn wanted to tell more complex stories, and for this, she needed to write. At the age of 13, Hahn found an interest in writing and illustrating children’s books. She began her first children’s book, Small Town Life, and while the book was never published, it marked the beginning of her career.

Hahn attended college at the University of Maryland at College Park, where she earned her Bachelors, Masters, and Doctorate degrees. While in college, Hahn had begun writing poetry and short stories. It wasn't until 1979, at the age of 41 when Hahn published her first book, The Sara Summer.

== Personal life ==
Mary Downing Hahn is the daughter of Kenneth Ernest Downing (an automobile mechanic) and Anna Elisabeth Sherwood (a teacher). Mary Downing married William E. Hahn on October 7, 1961, and together they had two daughters, Katherine Sherwood, and Margaret Elizabeth. After 16 years of marriage, they divorced and on April 23, 1982, Mary Downing Hahn married Norman Pearce Jacob (a librarian).

A few years after the release of her first book, at the age of 44, Hahn suffered from a major stroke.

== Careers ==
While Hahn is known as a novelist, she has had many different jobs throughout her career. From 1960 to 1961, she worked as an art teacher at a junior high school in Greenbelt, MD. In 1963, she worked as a clerk in a Hutzler's Department Store in Baltimore, MD. From 1963 to 1965, she worked as a homemaker and writer. From 1965 to 1970, she worked as an English instructor at the University of Maryland. Along with working at the university, from 1973 to 1975, Hahn also worked as a freelance artist for Cover to Cover. From 1975 to 1991, Hahn worked for Prince George's County Memorial Library System in Laurel, MD.

== Books ==
- The Sara Summer (1979)
- Time of the Witch (1982)
- Daphne's Book (1983)
- The Jellyfish Season (1985)
- Wait Till Helen Comes (1986)
- Tallahassee Higgins (1987)
- Following the Mystery Man (1988)
- December Stillness (1988)
- The Doll in the Garden (1989)
- The Dead Man in Indian Creek (1990)
- The Spanish Kidnapping Disaster (1991)
- Stepping on the Cracks (1991)
- The Wind Blows Backward (1993)
- Don't Give Up the Ghost (1993, contributor)
- Time for Andrew (1994)
- Look for Me by Moonlight (1995)
- The Gentleman Outlaw and Me–Eli (1996)
- Following My Own Footsteps (1996)
- As Ever, Gordy (1998)
- Anna All Year Round (1999)
- Promises to the Dead (2000)
- Anna on the Farm (2001)
- Hear the Wind Blow (2003)
- The Old Willis Place (2004)
- Janey and the Famous Author (2005)
- Witch Catcher (2006)
- Deep and Dark and Dangerous (2007)
- All the Lovely Bad Ones (2008)
- Closed for the Season (2009)
- The Ghost of Crutchfield Hall (2010)
- Mister Death's Blue-Eyed Girls (2012)
- Where I Belong (2014)
- Took (2015)
- One for Sorrow (2017)
- The Girl In The Locked Room (2018)
- Guest: A Changeling Tale (2019)
- The Puppet's Payback: And Other Chilling Tales (2020)
- The Thirteenth Cat (2021)
- What We Saw (2022)
- The Ghosts of Fulton Arms (2024)

== Awards ==
- Scott O'Dell Award for Historical Fiction for Stepping on the Cracks (1992)
- Mystery Writers of America Edgar Award for Closed for the Season (2010)

=== State awards ===
Wait Till Helen Comes (1986)

- Pacific Northwest Young Reader's Choice Award (Idaho, Montana, Oregon, and Washington)
- Rebecca Caudhill Young Readers' Book Award (Illinois)
- Young Hoosier Award (Indiana)
- Iowa Children's Choice Award
- Maud Hart Lovelace Award (Minnesota)
- Golden Sower Award (Nebraska)
- Volunteer State Book Award (Tennessee)
- Texas Bluebonnet Award
- Utah Children's Book Award
- Dorothy Canfield Fisher Children's Book Award (Vermont)
- Virginia Readers' Choice Award

The Doll in the Garden (1989)

- Georgia Children's Book Award
- Mark Twain Award (Missouri)
- Virginia Readers' Choice Award

The Dead Man In Indian Creek (1990)

- Colorado Children's Book Award
- Maud Hart Lovelace Award (Minnesota)
- South Carolina Children's Book Award
- Utah Children's Book Award
- Virginia Readers' Choice Award

Stepping on the Cracks (1991)

- Golden Sower Award (Nebraska)
- South Carolina Children's Book Award

Time for Andrew (1994)

- California Young Reader's Medal
- Georgia Children's Book Award
- Rebecca Caudhill Young Readers' Book Award (Illinois)
- William Allen White Children's Book Award (Kansas)
- Maryland Black-Eyed Susan Award
- Mark Twain Award (Missouri)
- Texas Bluebonnet Award
- Utah Children's Book Award
- Dorothy Canfield Fisher Children's Book Award (Vermont)
- Virginia Readers' Choice Award

The Gentleman Outlaw and Me—Eli (1996)

- Iowa Children's Choice Award

The Old Willis Place (2004)

- William Allen White Children's Book Award (Kansas)
- Golden Sower Award (Nebraska)
- South Carolina Children's Book Award
- Volunteer State Book Award (Tennessee)
- Dorothy Canfield Fisher Children's Book Award (Vermont)

Witch Catcher (2006)

- West Virginia Children's Book Award

Deep and Dark and Dangerous (2007)

- Golden Sower Award (Nebraska)

Closed for the Season (2009)

- Golden Sower Award (Nebraska)
