= William Allen White Children's Book Award =

American children's literature award

- Awarded for: Excellence in children's literature
- Country: United States
- Presented by: Emporia State University
- First award: 1952
- Website: William Allen White Children's Book Award homepage

The William Allen White Children's Book Award is a set of two annual awards for books selected by vote of Kansas schoolchildren from lists prepared by committee. As a single award it was established in 1952 by Ruth Garver Gagliardo, a children's literature specialist at Emporia State University, which continues to direct the program. It is named for William Allen White (1868–1944), long-time publisher and editor of The Emporia Gazette. The White Award is the oldest statewide children's choice book award in the United States.

From 2001, two winners have been chosen each year, one by students in grades 3 to 5 and one by students in grades 6 to 8, from separate lists of books. The award website includes an archive of annual Master Lists that is complete back to the list of 18 books for school year 1952–53. Curriculum Guides "designed to be used in teaching or preparing instructional units" are prepared for books on the year's Master List and some past Guides are available.

Currently (as of October 2019), the annual celebration at Emporia early in October includes a Friday evening "Read-Ins and Sleepovers" with space for 100 people. After Saturday morning activities, student representatives present medals to the winning writers at the Awards Ceremony. Travel to Emporia is an incentive in some classroom reading programs. At least once (2011), a writer declined because of a conflict on the celebration date and was replaced as the White Award winner. (Note: The 59th celebration in 2011 conflicted with the National Book Festival in Washington where Gordon Korman was keynote speaker. So he declined and Eleven by Giff replaced Swindle by Korman as WAWCBA grades 3–5 winner.)

== Recipients and nominees 1953–2000 ==
There were 49 winners of the single William Allen White Book Children's Book Award in its 48 years through 2000, with two winners in 1974. Nominees are listed below winners.

Table key
Indicates the winner

Year	Author	Title	Ref.
1953	Elizabeth Yates	Amos Fortune, Free Man	
1953	Genevieve Foster	Abraham Lincoln	
1953	Ingri and Edgar Parin d'Aulaire	Benjamin Franklin	
1953	Mabel Leigh Hunt	Better Known as Johnny Appleseed	
1953	Doris Shannon Garst	Crazy Horse: Great Warrior of the Sioux	
1953	Elizabeth Coatsworth	Door to the North	
1953	Douglas W. Gorsline	Farm Boy	
1953	Jeanette Eaton	Gandhi, Fighter Without a Sword	
1953	James Daugherty	Landing of the Pilgrims	
1953	Katherine B. Shippen	Lightfoot	
1953	Ann Nolan Clark	Magic Money	
1953	William Penn DuBois	Peter Graves	
1953	Samuel H. Adams	The Pony Express	
1953	Addison Webb	Song of the Seasons	
1953	Marguerite Bro	Su-mei's Golden Year	
1953	Leon Wilson	This Boy Cody	
1953	Meindert DeJong	The Tower by the Sea	
1953	Joseph Wharton Lippincott	The Wahoo Bobcat	
1954	Doris Gates	Little Vic	
1954	Dorothy Aldis	Lucky Year	
1954	Valenti Angelo	Marble Fountain	
1954	Arna Bontemps	Chariot in the Sky	
1954	Conrad and Mary Buff	The Apple and the Arrow	
1954	Henry S. Commager	America’s Robert E. Lee	
1954	James Daugherty	Of Courage Undaunted	
1954	Eleanor Estes	Ginger Pye	
1954	Genevieve Foster	Andrew Jackson	
1954	Holling C. Holling	Minn of the Mississippi	
1954	Clara I. Judson	George Washington, Leader of the People	
1954	Lois Lenski	Prairie School	
1954	Julia Sauer	Light at Tern Rock	
1954	Katherine Shippen	Leif Eriksson	
1954	Sydney Taylor	All-of-a-Kind Family	
1954	Anne Terry White	Prehistoric America	
1954	Anne H. White	Story of Serapina	
1955	Jean Bailey	Cherokee Bill: Oklahoma Pacer	
1955	Natalie Savage Carlson	Talking Cat and Other Stories of French Canada	
1955	Ann Nolan Clark	Secret of the Andes	
1955	Elizabeth Coatsworth	The Last Fort	
1955	Alice Dalgliesh	The Bears on Hemlock Mountain	
1955	Loula Grace Erdman	The Wind Blows Free	
1955	Jean Craighead George and John L. George	Meph, the Pet Skunk	
1955	Walter Havighurst	Climb a Lofty Ladder: A Story of Swedish Settlement in Minnesota	
1955	Clara Ingram Judson	Thomas Jefferson: Champion of the People	
1955	Eloise Jarvis McGraw	Moccasin Trail	
1955	Florence Crannell Means	Carvers' George: a biography of George Washington Carver	
1955	Gian Carlo Menotti	Amahl and the Night Visitors	
1955	Reba Paeff Mirsky	Thirty-One Brothers and Sisters	
1955	Miriam Powell	Jareb	
1955	Elizabeth Ripley	Leonardo da Vinci	
1955	Albert B. Tibbets	The First Book of Bees	
1955	Ann Weil	Red Sails to Capri	
1955	E. B. White	Charlotte's Web	
1956	Marguerite Henry	Brighty of the Grand Canyon	
1956	Elizabeth Baity	America Before Man	
1956	Joseph Krumgold	...And Now Miguel	
1956	Jesse Stuart	The Beatinest Boy	
1956	Willis Lindquist	Burma Boy	
1956	Elizabeth Fraser Torjesen	Captain Ramsey’s Daughter	
1956	Oliver La Farge	Cochise of Arizona	
1956	Virginia Sorensen	Curious Missie	
1956	Carolyn Sherwin Bailey	Finnegan II: His Nine Live	
1956	Adele DeLeeuw	Hideaway House	
1956	Mary and Conrad Buff	Magic Maize	
1956	May McNeer	The Mexican Story	
1956	Robert Lawson	Mr. Revere and I	
1956	Emil E. Liers	An Otter's Story	
1956	Helen Acker	The School Train	
1956	Margot Benary-Isbert	The Ark	
1956	Clara Ingram Judson	Theodore Roosevelt	
1956	Evelyn Sibley Lampman	Tree Wagon	
1957	Phoebe Erickson	Daniel Coon	
1957	Thelma Bell	Snow	
1957	Margot Benary-Isbert	Rowan Farm	
1957	Clyde Bulla	Squanto, Friend of the White Men (later retitled Squanto, Friend of the Pilgrims)	
1957	Rebecca Caudill	The House of the Fifers	
1957	Marchette Chute	The Wonderful Winter	
1957	Elizabeth Coatsworth	The Sod House	
1957	Alice Dalgliesh	The Courage of Sarah Noble	
1957	Meindert DeJong	The Wheel on the School	
1957	Jim Kjelgaard	Haunt Fox	
1957	Jonreed Lauritzen	The Ordeal of the Young Hunter	
1957	Robert Lawson	The Tough Winter	
1957	Beatrice Liu	Little Wu and the Watermelons	
1957	Gladys Malvern	The Foreigner - A Story of Ruth	
1957	Joice NanKivell Loch	Tales of Christophilos	
1957	William O. Steele	Winter Danger	
1957	Dorothy Sterling	Freedom Train: The Story of Harriet Tubman	
1957	James Ramsey Ullman	Banner in the Sky	
1958	Elliott Arnold	White Falcon	
1958	Virginia Eifert	The Buffalo Trace	
1958	Jean Lee Latham	Carry On, Mr. Bowditch	
1958	Alice Dalgliesh	The Columbus Story	
1958	Belle Dorman Rugh	Crystal Mountain	
1958	Jennie Lindquist	The Golden Name Day	
1958	Ronald Syme	Henry Hudson	
1958	Robert Hofsinde	The Indian's Secret World	
1958	Meindert DeJong	The Little Cow and the Turtle	
1958	Yoshiko Uchida	The Magic Listening Cap: More Folk Tales from Japan	
1958	Katherine B. Shippen	Men, Microscopes, and Living Things	
1958	Kate Seredy	Philomena	
1958	Wilma Pitchford Hays	Pilgrim Thanksgiving	
1958	Virginia Sorensen	Plain Girl	
1958	Elizabeth Yates	Prudence Crandall, Woman of Courage	
1958	Stella F. Rapaport	Reindeer Rescue	
1958	Ann Nolan Clark	Santiago	
1958	Reba Paeff Mirsky	Seven Grandmothers	
1958	Beverly Butler	Song of the Voyageur	
1958	Jeanette Eaton	Trumpeter's Tale: The Story of Young Louis Armstrong	
1958	Natalie Savage Carlson	Wings Against the Wind	
1959	Fred Gipson	Old Yeller	
1959	D. Moreau Barringer	And the Waters Prevailed	
1959	Dorothy Rhoads	The Corn Grows Ripe	
1959	Ruth Sawyer	The Enchanted Schoolhouse	
1959	Oliver Butterworth	The Enormous Egg	
1959	Lee McGiffin	The Fifer of San Jacinto	
1959	Beverly Cleary	Fifteen	
1959	Meindert DeJong	The House of Sixty Fathers	
1959	William O. Steele	Lone Hunt	
1959	Virginia Sorensen	Miracles on Maple Hill	
1959	Clara Ingram Judson	Mr. Justice Holmes	
1959	Elizabeth Ladd	The Night of the Hurricane	
1959	Elizabeth Coatsworth	The Peddler's Cart	
1959	Alice Dalgliesh	Ride on the Wind	
1959	Julie Forsyth Batchelo	Sea Lady	
1959	Mabel Leigh Hunt	Stars for Cristy	
1959	Dorothy Sterling	The Story of Caves	
1959	Harry Behn	The Wizard in the Well	
1960	William O. Steele	Flaming Arrows	
1960	May McNeer	America's Abraham Lincoln	
1960	Clara Ingram Judson	Benjamin Franklin	
1960	Alice Marriott	Black Stone Knife	
1960	Elizabeth George Speare	Calico Captive	
1960	Eula Mark Phillips	Chucho: The boy with the Good Name	
1960	Hildegarde Swift	The Edge of April: A Biography of John Burroughs	
1960	Elizabeth Enright	Gone-Away Lake	
1960	Mari Sandoz	The Horsecatcher	
1960	Emma Gelders Sterne	Mary McLeod Bethune	
1960	Robert Willis	Molly's Hannibal: a Story of the Erie Canal	
1960	Harold Keith	Rifles for Watie	
1960	Ellis Credle	Tall Tales from the High Hills and Other Stories	
1960	Elspeth Bragdon	That Jud!	
1960	Jean Lee Latham	This Dear-Bought Land	
1960	Leo Gurko	Tom Paine, Freedom's Apostle	
1960	Billy C. Clark	The Trail of the Hunter's Horn	
1961	Keith Robertson	Henry Reed, Inc.	
1961	Meindert DeJong	Along Came a Dog	
1961	Jeanette Eaton	America's Own Mark Twain	
1961	Jean Fritz	The Cabin Faced West	
1961	Dorothy Sterling	Captain of the Planter: The Story of Robert Smalls	
1961	Elizabeth Coatsworth	The Cave	
1961	Francis Kalnay	Chucaro: Wild Pony of the Pampa	
1961	Mary and Conrad Buff	Elf Owl	
1961	Natalie Savage Carlson	The Family Under the Bridge	
1961	Aylesa Forsee	Louis Agassiz: Pied Piper of Science	
1961	Rafaello Busoni	The Man who was Don Quixote: the story of Miguel Cervantes	
1961	Harold Felton	New Tall Tales of Pecos Bill	
1961	Edith Lambert Sharp	Nkwala	
1961	Elizabeth Yates	Pebble in a Pool: The Widening Circles of Dorothy Canfield Fisher's Life	
1961	William O. Steele	The Perilous Road	
1961	Elizabeth Marie Pope	The Sherwood Ring	
1961	Yoshiko Uchida	Takao and Grandfather's Sword	
1961	Ruth Franchere	Willa: The Story of Willa Cather's Growing Up	
1961	Elizabeth George Speare	The Witch of Blackbird Pond	
1961	Jean Lee Latham	Young Man in a Hurry: the Story of Cyrus W. Field	
1962	Catherine Owens Pearen	The Helen Keller Story	
1962	Isabella Holt	The Adventures of Rinaldo	
1962	Gerald W. Johnson	America is Born: A History for Peter	
1962	Annabel & Edgar Johnson	The Black Symbol	
1962	Natalie Savage Carlson	A Brother for the Orphelines	
1962	Elizabeth Janet Gray	The Cheerful Heart	
1962	Sidney Rosen	Doctor Paracelsus	
1962	Edgar Parker	The Duke of Sycamore	
1962	Arna Bontemps	Frederick Douglass: Slave, Fighter, Freeman	
1962	Carol Kendall	The Gammage Cup	
1962	Jennie Lindquist	The Little Silver House	
1962	Alberta Wilson Constant	Miss Charity Comes to Stay	
1962	Louise A. Stinetorf	Musa the Shoemaker	
1962	Jean Craighead George	My Side of the Mountain	
1962	Joseph Krumgold	Onion John	
1962	Margaret Mead	People and Places	
1962	John Ciardi	The Reason for the Pelican	
1962	Margery Sharp	The Rescuers	
1962	Harold Courlander	The Tiger's Whisker and Other Tales from Asia and the Pacific	
1962	Harry Behn	The Two Uncles of Pablo	
1962	Genevieve Foster	The World of Captain John Smith	
1962	Robert Frost	You Come Too	
1962	Scott O'Dell	Island of the Blue Dolphins	
1962	Jean Fritz	Brady	
1962	George Selden	The Cricket in Times Square	
1962	Mary Stolz	A Dog on Barkham Street	
1962	Jean Lee Latham	Drake: The Man They Called a Pirate	
1962	Sorche Nic Leodhas	Heather and Broom: Tales of the Scottish Highland	
1962	William Bixby	The Impossible Journey of Sir Ernest Shackleton	
1962	Peter Burchard	Jed : the Story of a Yankee Soldier and a Southern Boy	
1962	Jack Schaefer	Old Ramon	
1962	Ursula Nordstrom	The Secret Language	
1962	Marjorie Braymer	The Walls of Windy Troy: A Biography of Heinrich Schliemann	
1962	Carl Sandburg	Wind Song	
1962	Ann Nolan Clark	World Song	
1962	Ruth Sawyer	The Year of the Christmas Dragon	
1964	Sheila Burnford	The Incredible Journey	
1964	Esther M. Douty	America's First Woman Chemist: Ellen Richards	
1964	Mary Stolz	Belling the Tiger	
1964	Elizabeth George Speare	The Bronze Bow	
1964	Margot Benary-Isbert	Dangerous Spring	
1964	Margaret L. Coit	The Fight for Union	
1964	Joanne Williamson	The Glorious Conspiracy	
1964	Eloise Jarvis McGraw	The Golden Goblet	
1964	Jonreed Lauritzen	The Legend of Billy Bluesage	
1964	John Ciardi	The Man Who Sang the Sillies	
1964	Russell Davis	Marine at War	
1964	Nardi Reeder Campion	Patrick Henry, Firebrand of the Revolution	
1964	Norton Juster	The Phantom Tollbooth	
1964	Edith Patterson Meyer	Pirate Queen	
1964	Elizabeth Enright	Return to Gone-Away	
1964	Leonard Wibberley	Sea Captain from Salem	
1964	Natalie Savage Carlson	The Song of the Lop-Eared Mule	
1964	Aileen Fisher	Summer of Little Rain	
1964	Jean Merrill	The Superlative Horse: A Tale of Ancient China	
1964	Johanna Johnston	Thomas Jefferson, His Many Talents	
1964	Glen Rounds	Wild Orphan	
1965	Zachary Ball	Bristle Face	
1966	Sterling North	Rascal	
1967	Annabel and Edgar Johnson	The Grizzly	
1968	Beverly Cleary	The Mouse and the Motorcycle	
1969	Keith Robertson	Henry Reed's Baby-Sitting Service	
1970	E. L. Konigsburg	From the Mixed-Up Files of Mrs. Basil E. Frankweiler	
1971	Walt Morey	Kävik the Wolf Dog	
1972	Barbara Corcoran	Sasha: My Friend	
1973	E. B. White	The Trumpet of the Swan	
1974	Robert C. O'Brien	Mrs. Frisby and the Rats of NIMH	
1974	Zilpha Keatley Snyder	The Headless Cupid	
1975	William Steig	Dominic	
1976	Beverly Cleary	Socks	
1977	George Selden	Harry Cat's Pet Puppy	
1978	Jean Van Leeuwen	The Great Christmas Kidnapping Caper	
1979	Wilson Rawls	Summer of the Monkeys	
1980	Betsy Byars	The Pinballs	
1981	Katherine Paterson	The Great Gilly Hopkins	
1982	C. S. Adler	The Magic of the Glits	
1983	Barbara Brooks Wallace	Peppermints in the Parlor	
1984	Shel Silverstein	A Light in the Attic	
1985	Quang Nhuong Huynh	The Land I Lost	
1986	Mary Downing Hahn	Daphne's Book	
1987	Robert Kimmel Smith	The War with Grandpa	
1988	Betsy Byars	Cracker Jackson	
1989	Marion Dane Bauer	On My Honor	
1990	Gary Paulsen	Hatchet	
1991	Bill Wallace	Beauty	
1992	Mary Downing Hahn	The Doll in the Garden: A Ghost Story	
1993	Jerry Spinelli	Maniac Magee	
1994	Phyllis Reynolds Naylor	Shiloh	
1995	June Rae Wood	The Man Who Loved Clowns	
1996	Lois Lowry	The Giver	
1997	Mary Downing Hahn	Time For Andrew: A Ghost Story	
1998	Barbara Park	Mick Harte Was Here	
1999	Andrew Clements	Frindle	
2000	P. J. Petersen	White Water	

== Recipients 2001–Present ==
Year	Grades 3–5		Grades 6–8	
2001	Cynthia C. DeFelice	The Ghost of Fossil Glen	Louis Sachar	Holes
2002	Andrew Clements	The Landry News	Christopher Paul Curtis	Bud, Not Buddy
2003	Kate DiCamillo	Because of Winn-Dixie	Frances O'Roark Dowell	Dovey Coe
2004	Peni R. Griffin	Ghost Sitter	Andrea Warren	Surviving Hitler: A Boy in the Nazi Death Camps
2005	Jerry Spinelli	Loser	Stephanie S. Tolan	Surviving the Applewhites
2006	Sue Stauffacher	Donuthead	Jeanne DuPrau	The City of Ember
2007	Andrew Clements	The Report Card	Sarah Weeks	So B. It
2008	Ann M. Martin	A Dog's Life: The Autobiography of a Stray	L. D. Harkrader	Airball: My Life in Briefs
2009	Sara Pennypacker	Clementine	Jennifer Roy	Yellow Star
2010	Barbara O'Connor	How to Steal a Dog	Cynthia Kadohata	Cracker! The Best Dog in Viet Nam
2011	Patricia Reilly Giff	Eleven	Susan Campbell Bartoletti	The Boy Who Dared
2012	Wendy Mass	11 Birthdays	Diana López	Confetti Girl
2013	Patrick Jennings	Guinea Dog	Peg Kehret	Ghost Dog Secrets
2014	Don Brown	America is Under Attack: September 11, 2001	Helen Frost	Hidden
2015	W. H. Beck	Malcolm at Midnight	M. H. Herlong	Buddy
2016	Sharon Creech	The Boy on the Porch	Chris Grabenstein	Escape from Mr. Lemoncello's Library
2017	Jennifer Brown	Life on Mars	Dianna Dorisi Winget	A Million Ways Home
2018	Lynda Mullaly Hunt	Fish in a Tree	Mary Downing Hahn	Took
2019	Sara Pennypacker	Pax	Jason Reynolds	Ghost
2020	Dusti Bowling	Insignificant Events in the Life of a Cactus	Gordon Korman	Restart: Lose Your Memory. Find Your Life
2021	Katherine Arden	Small Spaces	Jewell Parker Rhodes	Ghost Boys
2022	Rodman Philbrick	Wildfire: A Novel	Dan Gemeinhart	The Remarkable Journey of Coyote Sunrise
2023	Lindsay Currie	Scritch Scratch	J. L. Esplin	96 Miles
2024	McCall Hoyle	Stella	Alan Gratz	Ground Zero
2025	Katherine Applegate	Odder	Gordon Korman	The Fort
2026	Shannon Earle	The Penguin of Ilha Grande	Angela Cervantes	The Cursed Moon
