= Herlong =

Herlong may refer to:

- Herlong (surname)
- Herlong, California, a small town in the United States

== See also ==
- Herlong Junction, California, unincorporated community
- Herlong Recreational Airport
