= Leigh Hunt (disambiguation) =

Leigh Hunt (1784–1859) was an English essayist and poet.

Leigh Hunt may also refer to:

- Thornton Leigh Hunt (1810–1873), English journalist, first editor of The Daily Telegraph
- Leigh S. J. Hunt (1855–1933), American entrepreneur
- Ronald Leigh-Hunt (1920–2005), British actor
- Barbara Leigh-Hunt (1935–2024), English actor
- Mabel Leigh Hunt (1892–1971), American writer
- Leigh Hunt (?–2007), person and character referred to in 17 books by Clive Cussler

== See also ==
- Leigh Hunt Glacier, a place-name
- Lee Hunt (disambiguation)
