= Susannah Willard Johnson =

Captive of Native Americans and author of a captivity narrative

- Born: Susannah Willard (Note: Susannah Johnson's first name has alternatively been given as "Susana" and "Susanna". The spelling "Susannah", which appears in early editions of her narrative as well as on her headstone, is used here.); February 20, 1729/30 (Note: Some sources list the year of her birth as 1730 and others as 1729. However, a sermon preached by Reverend Abner Kneeland on February 10, 1811 (contained in an appendix in the third and later editions of Johnson's narrative) states that she died "in the eighty-first year of her age.", that is, the year starting after her 80th birthday, and Johnson's headstone lists her age as 80 years old, so both those sources favour birth in 1730.); Turkey Hills, Lunenburg, Massachusetts
- Died: November 27, 1810 (aged 80–81); Langdon, New Hampshire, US
- Resting place: Forest Hill Cemetery, East St., Charlestown, New Hampshire
- Other names: Susannah Willard Hastings; Susannah Johnson Hastings
- Occupations: Memoirist, diarist
- Notable work: A Narrative of the Captivity of Mrs. Johnson (only known extant work)

Susannah Willard Johnson (February 20, 1729/30 – November 27, 1810) was an Anglo-American woman who was captured with her family during an Abenaki raid on Charlestown, New Hampshire, in August 1754, just after the outbreak of the French and Indian War. Johnson and her family were marched for weeks through the wilderness of New England and Quebec before arriving at the Abenaki village in Saint-François-du-Lac, Quebec. The Johnsons were held for ransom until being sold off into slavery to the French.

After her release in 1758, Johnson returned to her home in Charlestown. Beginning in 1796, she recorded a full account of her ordeal. The first edition of her narrative was composed by John Curtis Chamberlain (using information from Johnson's oral testimony and notes) and appeared in small circulation later that year; subsequent editions were revised and edited by Johnson and published in 1807, and posthumously in 1814. Her harrowing memoir, although not the first work in the captivity narrative genre, was among the most widely read and studied accounts. It was republished numerous times in following years. Elizabeth George Speare's 1957 historical fiction children's novel, Calico Captive, was inspired by Johnson's story.

== Biography ==
Susannah Willard was born in Turkey Hills, Lunenburg, Massachusetts. Her father was killed in 1756 by Native Americans while repairing a fence.

Willard had twelve siblings in all: Aaron; John; Miriam; Moses, Jr.; James Nutting; Jemima; Mary; Elizabeth; Abigail; and Huldah Willard. In 1742, Moses Willard and his wife relocated to Fort at Number 4, the northernmost British settlement along the Connecticut River, in what is now Charlestown. His children, including Susannah, joined him at No. 4 in June 1749. By then, only five other families had settled in the sparsely populated area.

Susannah Willard married Captain James Johnson in Lunenburg on June 15, 1747. Following his death, she married a second time in 1762 to John Hastings, Jr. (d. November 21, 1804). At the time of the August 1754 raid, Johnson had three children, but mothered fourteen children in all, having seven children with James and seven with John. In order from oldest to youngest, they were: Sylvanus, Susanna, Mary, and Elizabeth Johnson; and Theodosia, Randilla, and Susanna Hastings, as well as seven other infants who died during birth or from disease.

After her release from captivity, Susannah Johnson lived in Lancaster, Massachusetts, until October 1759, moving to Charlestown later that month and settling on her late husband's estate. She opened a small store to support her family, which she tended to for two years before marrying her second husband. She died on November 27, 1810, in Langdon and was buried at Forest Hill Cemetery in Charlestown.

== Honors ==
A monument was erected at the cemetery on August 30, 1870, by some of Johnson's relatives and descendants. During the monument's dedication, a historical address was given by Reverend Benjamin Labaree, who served as president of Middlebury College from 1840 until 1866. The monument stands near the graves of Susannah and James Johnson in the Briggs Hill Road area of the cemetery.

== Abenaki raid ==
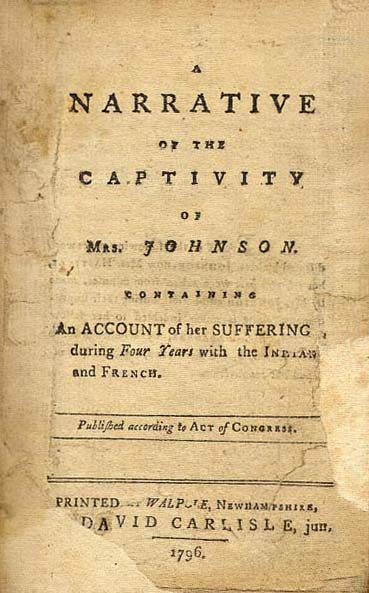
The title page of the first edition of A Narrative of the Captivity of Mrs. Johnson (Walpole, NH, 1796).

In 1749, an uneasy peace had been declared between the French and British, and by 1753 attacks against the township of No. 4 by Abenaki and Mohawk, who were allied with the French, had largely subsided. A year later surfacing rumors of war panicked the colonists, but the townsfolk were put at ease following the return of Captain James Johnson from a trading trip on August 24, 1754. While trading in Connecticut (having left his wife, Susannah, and three children behind at the No. 4), Johnson had been informed that war was not expected until at least the following spring. Feeling relieved and cheerful that they would have time to relocate to Northfield, New Hampshire, before then, the family invited their neighbors to dinner and held a party late into the night of August 29.

During the early hours of August 30, while the Johnsons were sound asleep, an armed Abenaki party raided the enclosed stockade of Fort No. 4, abducting Susannah Johnson, her husband, their three children: 6-year-old Sylvanus, 4-year-old Susanna, and 2-year-old Polly, as well as Susannah Johnson's 14-year-old sister, Miriam Willard. (There were numerous small-scale armed engagements between the settlers and Natives in the years prior, leaving dozens of settlers dead; the nearest British settlement was Fort Dummer, more than 30 miles (50 km) away.) Also among the captives were the Johnsons' neighbors, Peter Labarree and his hired servant, Ebenezer Farnsworth. The Abenaki looted whatever food they could find before setting fire to the Johnsons' home.

At the time of the attack, Susannah was nine months pregnant. The following day, as the party was marching through the wilderness of what is now Reading, Vermont, she gave birth to a daughter, whom she named Elizabeth Captive Johnson. Johnson was given a pair of moccasins and allowed to ride a stolen horse belonging to Captain Phineas Stevens, a colonist who had served as commander of the Fort's militia until 1750. The horse, named Scoggin and captured the night before, was killed and eaten during the journey after the party had run out of food; the Abenaki made a soup from the bone marrow while the captives were allowed to eat the flesh.

After arriving at St. Francis on September 19, with a full three weeks of journey behind them, the captives, whose faces had been decorated in vermilion paint, were forced to run the gantlet past a parade of Abenaki warriors armed with tomahawks, war clubs, and knives. While the prisoners expected a severe beating or death, Johnson wrote in her accounts that she was "agreeably disappointed" when she realized that "each Indian only gave us a tap on the shoulder"; the Abenaki especially treated the women "decently" and none among them was seriously harmed. The captives were held for approximately two and a half months, long enough for Johnson to develop an elementary vocabulary of Abenaki words.

=== Incarceration ===
One by one the captives were taken to Montreal to be sold to the French, starting with James Johnson and followed by Peter Labarree, Ebenezer Farnsworth, Miriam Willard, and Johnson's two oldest daughters, Susanna and Mary. By October 15, 1754, Susannah Johnson, along with her infant daughter, Elizabeth, and her son, Sylvanus, were the only prisoners still held at the Abenaki village. In mid-November, Susannah and Elizabeth were sold to a French household, and eventually arrived in Montreal, where they were able to rejoin their family. Sylvanus was left behind at the Abenaki village, having apparently been adopted by the Abenaki and prevented from leaving.

James was soon granted a two-month parole, an opportunity he used to travel to New York in an attempt to raise funds for his family's ransom. He was unable to return in time, violating his parole. Upon his return to Quebec City in late July 1755, he and his wife, along with daughters Mary and Elizabeth, were detained and held in a jail, where "conditions were too shocking for description." (Johnson's eldest daughter, Susanna, was under the care of "three affluent old maids" and was never incarcerated.) The family remained imprisoned from July 1755 to July 1757—six months were spent in a criminal jail and the remainder in civil prison. During this time, all of the Johnsons had contracted smallpox. In December 1756 Susannah gave birth to a son, although he "lived but a few hours, and was buried under the Cathedral Church."

In late June 1757, Susannah received a letter stating that her petitioning of the governor for their release had been successful. Her sister, Miriam, was allowed to rejoin her, and it was arranged for the women to be sent to England in exchange for French prisoners. (While Susannah, Miriam, Mary, and Elizabeth were all sent to England, James was not granted permission to leave and continued to fulfill his remaining prison sentence.)

=== Release ===
On July 20, Susannah Johnson boarded an England-bound vessel in Quebec with her two daughters and sister. The next morning, the ship sailed down the St. Lawrence River and entered the Atlantic, finally arriving in Plymouth on August 19. The family stayed at Plymouth for two weeks, later sailing to Portsmouth, and from Portsmouth to Cork, before finally boarding a packet ship en route to New York. They arrived at Sandy Hook, New Jersey, on December 10, 1757—the first time in more than three years and three months the family had returned their native country. From there they traveled to Lancaster, where Susannah Johnson reunited with her husband on January 1, 1758. However, as James Johnson's legal troubles for violating his parole were still unresolved—complicated due to his rank of captain in the British militia—he soon traveled back to New York to "adjust his Canada accounts," and, while there, was "persuaded by Gov. Pownal to take a Captain's commission, and join the forces bound for Ticonderoga." James Johnson was killed on July 8, 1758, at the Battle of Carillon.

The eldest of Susannah Johnson's children, Sylvanus, who was 6 years old at the time of the raid, was adopted by the Abenaki. He did not see his mother again until he was ransomed in October 1758 for "the sum of five hundred livres." He was subsequently brought to Northampton, Massachusetts, by then-Major Israel Putnam, where he was finally reunited with his mother. Johnson wrote that Sylvanus, by then aged 11, was almost completely assimulated to Abenaki customs, having long forgotten the English language. Fluent in Abenaki and conversational in French, he was fully accustomed to Abenaki life. While he was gradually reassimilated and his Abenaki habits "wore off by degrees", he maintained certain Abenaki customs until the end of his life.

Susannah Johnson's eldest daughter, Susanna, was eventually reunited with her family after the French surrendered Montreal in September 1760.

Peter Labaree made an escape from the French in the early spring of 1757, traveling several hundred miles from Montreal to Albany, New York, by foot, before finally arriving at his home in Charlestown in the winter. During his journey, Labaree traveled only at night in order to avoid detection and capture by the Natives, at one point apparently traversing a swamp over a period of three days. Ebenezer Farnsworth reached his home at No. 4 some time before the rest of the captives, although the exact circumstances of his release or escape are not known.

== Captivity narrative ==
In 1796, a full forty-two years after her capture by Indians, Johnson decided to record an account of her ordeal. Using her surviving letters, notes and diary, as well the memories of her family and fellow captives Labarree and Farnsworth, (Note: A printed note on the verso of the first edition's (Walpole, NH, 1796) title page states: "Part of the following pages were dictated by Mrs. Johnson, now Mrs. Hastings, herself, and part were taken from minutes, made by Mr. Johnson and herself, during their imprisonment. She is much indebted to her fellow prisoner, Mr. Labaree, by whose assistance many incidents are mentioned, which had escaped her attention.") she dictated her account to Charlestown lawyer John Curtis Chamberlain, who ghostwrote (Note: Other than the i8 mo version of the first edition (Walpole, NH, 1796), all publications of Johnson's memoir, as well as most academic literature written on the subject of captivity narratives, list Johnson as the author. For more information on the narrative's authorship, see Farmer (1822), Saunderson (1876), Carroll (2004) and Kestler, Frances Roe. The Indian Captivity Narrative: A Woman's View. New York: Garland, 1990.) the first edition (with the possible collaboration of Joseph Dennie and Royall Tyler). Titled A Narrative of the Captivity of Mrs. Johnson, it was printed by Isaiah Thomas and David Carlisle in 1796 in Walpole, New Hampshire. A second edition, expanded and revised by Johnson herself, was published in 1807 and printed by Alden Spooner in Windsor, Vermont.

By the winter of 1810, Johnson was nearing the end of her life. She had finished a new chapter for her narrative as late as September 1810, and was "very anxious" to have the "considerably enlarged" third edition published before her death; her efforts, however, proved unfruitful. When it was finally printed four years later in Windsor by Thomas M. Pomeroy, literature on Indian captivity was fairly common, and numerous collections were in mass circulation, such as 1808's A Selection of Some of the Most Interesting Narratives of Outrages Committed by the Indians by Archibald Loudon. Despite this, her authentic account, which was considered one of the most accurate and riveting, became widely read and studied.

Johnson's memoir was originally published in England in pamphlet form under the title The Captive American (Newcastle: M. Angus, 1797, and Air: Printed by J. and P. Wilson, 1802), as well as in Scotland under the original title (Glasgow: Printed by R. Chapman for Stewart & Meikle, 1797). It has since been reproduced numerous times in the United States and Britain. The narrative has also been translated into French and published in Quebec under the title Récit d'une captive en Nouvelle-France, 1754–1760 (Sillery: Septentrion, 2003, trans. Louis Tardivel).

=== Publication history ===
A Narrative of the Captivity of Mrs. Johnson
Year	Location	Publisher	Printer	Size	Pages	Notes
1796	Walpole, NH	Published according to Act of Congress	David Carlisle	12 mo	144 pp	1st ed., manuscript composed by John C. Chamberlain; very rare
1807	Windsor, VT	Published according to Act of Congress	Alden Spooner	18 mo	144 pp	2nd ed., manuscript "corrected and enlarged" by Johnson
1814	Windsor, VT	No indication of publisher	Thomas M. Pomroy	12 mo	178 pp	3rd ed., "considerably enlarged" by Johnson; most commonly reprinted edition
1834	Lowell, MA	Daniel Bixby	John Emmes Dill	18 mo	150 pp	4th ed.
1841	New York, NY	No indication of publisher	No indication of printer	18 mo	111 pp	5th ed., does not include the notes or appendix from the 3rd and 4th editions

== See also ==
- Calico Captive
- Captivity narrative
- Fort at Number 4
- Franco-Indian alliance
