= Keeping the Promise =

- DVD cover
- Genre: Historical drama
- Based on: The Sign of the Beaver by Elizabeth George Speare
- Written by: Gerald Di Pego
- Directed by: Sheldon Larry
- Starring: Keith Carradine; Annette O'Toole; Brendan Fletcher; Gordon Tootoosis; Maury Chaykin; Allegra Denton; William Lightning
- Music by: Eric Colvin
- Country of origin: United States
- Original language: English

Production
- Producer: Martin Katz
- Production locations: Pickering, Ontario
- Cinematography: Ron Stannett
- Running time: 93 minutes
- Production companies: Rabbit Ears Production; Questar Entertainment

Original release
- Network: CBS
- Release: January 5, 1997

Keeping the Promise is a 1997 historical drama television film based on the children's novel The Sign of the Beaver by Elizabeth George Speare. The film was released to DVD and VHS on July 25, 2000. It was shot in Ontario, Canada.

== Plot ==
Keeping The Promise tells the story of a 13-year-old boy, Matt (Brendan Fletcher) and his father, (Keith Carradine) who, as early settlers, together build a wooden cabin in Maine in 1768. However, Matt's father must head back to Quincy, Massachusetts, to get Matt's mother, sister, and newborn sibling who were all left behind so Matt and his father could build shelter for them. Matt's father promises to return in seven weeks and Matt is left alone with his father's old watch (a family heirloom) and a hunting rifle to guard the family's newly built homestead and field crops. Unfortunately, Matt finds himself enduring many hardships for which he is unprepared. His hunting rifle is stolen by a stranger named Ben Loomis; while chasing after Ben: Matt trips and falls into a river, unconscious. Luckily, Matt's misadventure has not gone unnoticed and he is pulled from the water. The Indians he has learned to fear, through tales that his father had told him, save his life in this part of the story.

His injured leg is treated by the Indian chief named Saknis. While recovering, Matt begrudgingly allows Saknis to take his book (Robinson Crusoe) for saving his life. Saknis later returns with the book and asks Matt whether a knife or a book would win a fight - Matt says the knife would win, Saknis points out that the words of the white man have already won the land away from his people. Saknis commands that Matt is to teach his grandson to read. Although uncertain of how to teach anyone, especially the unwilling Attean, Matt accepts the task out of obligation, as he owes his life to the man.

Meanwhile, his father returns to his family only to find there is a fever in the village which kills their neighbour's daughter, the family leave quickly knowing that the town will probably be closed to stop the spread of fever. On their way the newborn and the mother come down with fever, this delays them and when they reach the boat for its last crossing before winter they are turned back because of the baby's illness. The Mother recovers, but the baby does not and has to be buried as they travel the land route.

Back in Maine, Matt does not immediately befriend Attean, although the two young boys eventually form a strong friendship as they help each other through difficult circumstances. When Matt's family has not yet returned after many months Attean invites Matt to join his tribe, who are moving west to new hunting grounds. Although Matt is good friends with Attean and enjoys Indian culture, he has not forgotten his family. Matt has to decide whether to join the Indian tribe or return to his cabin and wait for his family to return.

Near the end of the story, Attean goes on a vision quest and becomes a brave. He visits Matt and gives him a pair of snowshoes for the winter and asks him to come with the tribe. Matt decides to wait for his family, although parting from his new friend, Attean, is difficult. The two boys trade gifts, Matt gives Attean the book of Robinson Crusoe and Attean leaves his dog behind with Matt. Sure enough, Matt's family returns in the winter snows, guided for the last few days by Ben Loomis, who makes himself absent as soon as the family are reunited.

== Characters ==
- Brendan Fletcher as Matt Hallowell
- Keith Carradine as William "Will" Hallowell, Matt's Father
- Annette O'Toole as Anne Hallowell, Matt's Mother
- Allegra Denton as Sarah Hallowell, Matt's Sister
- Gordon Tootoosis as Chief Saknis, Attean's Grandfather
- William Lightning as Attean
- Maury Chaykin as Ben Loomis
- David Cubitt as Boat Agent
