= Applewhaite =

Applewhaite is a surname. Notable people with the surname include:

- Ackeel Applewhaite (born 1999), Barbadian footballer
- Andre Applewhaite (born 2002), Barbadian footballer
- Edward Applewhaite (1898–1964), Canadian politician

== See also ==
- Surviving the Applewhites
