= New Found World =

1945 children's novel by Katherine Shippen

- Author: Katherine Shippen
- Illustrator: C. B. Falls
- Language: English
- Genre: Children's literature /history
- Publication date: 1945
- Publication place: United States
- Pages: 262

New Found World is a 1945 children's history of Latin America book written by Katherine Shippen and illustrated by C. B. Falls. It covers the Aztec, the Mayan and the Inca civilizations, the Conquistadors, the search for El Dorado, the coming of Christianity, and the struggle for independence of the colonial powers. The book was a Newbery Honor recipient in 1946, coming in last place during voting.

== Veracity ==
The Southwestern Historical Quarterly review said the book was riddled with "inaccuracy and unjustifiable vagueness"; for example, Shippen claims that Manga de Clavo was in Venezuela, rather than Mexico; the review concluded by saying "A book designed to give information, even on the careless level of juvenility, should be scrupulously accurate".
