= On My Honor =

Young adult fiction by Marion Dane Bauer

- First edition
- Author: Marion Dane Bauer
- Language: English
- Genre: Children's literature
- Publisher: Clarion Books
- Publication date: September 22, 1986
- Publication place: United States
- Media type: Print
- Pages: 90
- Awards: Newbery Honor; William Allen White Children's Book Award
- ISBN: 0329967819
- OCLC: 1003740562

On My Honor is a novel by Marion Dane Bauer, first published in 1986. In 1987, it was a Newbery Honor Book and it won the William Allen White Children's Book Award in 1989. On My Honor has been used in the United States as part of school curriculums and has a separate study guide authored by Gail D. Hanna.

== Plot summary ==
Soon to start seventh grade, Joel and Tony have been close friends for years. They head out on a bicycle adventure to Starved Rock Bluffs. Joel is surprised that his protective father even permits him to go. "On my honor," he tells his dad during his promise that he'll only bike to the park and nowhere else.

Tony has a different idea, though—a reckless one—to ford the dangerous Vermilion River in order to stand on its sandbar. They argue, but Joel reluctantly agrees and reaches the sandbar first. When Tony never appears, Joel realizes Tony has drowned in the rough current.

At first, Joel conceals the accident and silently sears with remorse. Then the truth is revealed, and Joel must outwardly grapple with anger and guilt. Now Joel faces both the discomfort of adolescence as well as the murkiness of grief. His father is there to guide him.

== Reception ==
Publishers Weekly stated that On My Honor was "devastating but beautifully written" and dealt with death and love in an honest and gripping manner. Kirkus Reviews agreed and added that Bauer crafted a "compassionate portrayal of a boy's struggle with conscience."

Between 1990 and 1999, On My Honor was one of the hundred books most frequently considered for banning in libraries and schools.

Awards
Preceded by Cracker Johnson	Winner of the William Allen White Children's Book Award; 1989	Succeeded by Hatchet
