= Journey Outside =

1969 children's book

- Author: Mary Q. Steele
- Illustrator: Rocco Negri
- Language: English
- Genre: Children's literature
- Publisher: Viking Press / Puffin
- Publication date: 1969
- Publication place: United States
- Media type: Hardback (Viking) / Paperback (Puffin)
- Pages: 143

Journey Outside is a 1969 children's novel written by Mary Q. Steele and illustrated by Rocco Negri. The story follows a young boy, Dilar, who grows tired of living up-ground and decides to escape to the surface, and explores themes of denial and acceptance. The book was a Newbery Honor book in 1969.

== Plot ==
Dilar lives underground with a group called the Raft People, who have lived underground for generations, traveling along subterranean rivers, seeking a rumoured place of day and green. Tired of his grandfather's assurances that they are traveling to somewhere better, Dilar leaves the group and makes his way to the surface.

Dilar sets out to find the truth about the history of his people, but the surface dwellers he encounters prove useless. Dilar meets a young girl and her doctor mother, but they have no thoughts of the past or future, living only in the present. Another group, the Desert People, is apathetic and has no motivation.

Dilar eventually meets a hermit named Vigan, who promises to reveal the history of the Raft People if Dilar can steal an eagle's egg. Successful, Vigar reveals that the Raft People originally lived along the coast but retreated underground after an extreme winter, intending to return to the surface. Dilar takes a map from Vigar and returns underground, intent on leading his people to the surface.
