= The Golden Name Day =

1955 children's book

- Author: Jennie Lindquist
- Illustrator: Garth Williams
- Language: English
- Genre: Children's literature
- Publisher: Harper
- Publication date: 1955
- Publication place: United States

The Golden Name Day is a children's book by Jennie Lindquist and illustrated by Garth Williams about a young girl who moves to Sweden to live with her grandparents and discovers she has no name day. It was published by Harper in 1955 and was a Newbery Honor book in 1956.
