= Have You Seen Tom Thumb? =

1942 children's book by Mabel Leigh Hunt

Have You Seen Tom Thumb
- Author: Mabel Leigh Hunt
- Illustrator: Fritz Eichenberg
- Language: English
- Genre: Children's literature
- Publisher: Lippincott
- Publication date: October 7, 1942
- Publication place: United States
- Pages: 266

Have You Seen Tom Thumb? is a 1942 children's fictionalized biography of Charles Sherwood Stratton written by Mabel Leigh Hunt and illustrated by Fritz Eichenberg. It tells the story of Stratton, a charming and humorous dwarf billed as "Tom Thumb", who traveled all over the world with the showman P. T. Barnum. Stratton joined Barnum's circus at 5 years old, first traveling to England, meeting Queen Victoria, then to France, where he performed for French king Louis Philippe. The circus returned to the United States, and Stratton married fellow dwarf Lavinia Waren, meeting President Lincoln in 1863 while on his honeymoon. The pair settled in Bridgeport, Connecticut, and he performed almost up to his death in 1883 at 45.

== Reception ==
The book received a Newbery Honor in 1943. The New York Times called it "one of the most delightful biographies of the year", the New York Herald Tribune said it was "as lovable a biography as you can find", and Kirkus Reviews said it was "a good biography for an extraordinary person".
