= Lee Hunt =

Lee Hunt may refer to:

- Lee Hunt (footballer), in 2007–08 UEFA Cup qualifying rounds
- Lee Hunt (basketball), player in 1981–82 NCAA Division I men's basketball season

== See also ==
- Leigh Hunt (disambiguation)
