= Paul A. W. Wallace =

Canadian historian and anthropologist

- Born: Paul Anthony Wilson Wallace; 1891; Toronto, Canada
- Died: 1967 (aged 75–76)
- Education: University of Toronto
- Children: Anthony F. C. Wallace
- Scientific career
- Fields: History, anthropology
- Workplaces: Lebanon Valley College; Pennsylvania Historical and Museum Commission

Paul Anthony Wilson Wallace (1891 – 1967) was a Canadian historian and anthropologist who specialized in colonial American history, focusing on Pennsylvania Germans and Native Americans in Pennsylvania.

Wallace was the father of the anthropologist Anthony Wallace.

== Works ==
- Baptiste Laroque: Legends Of French-Canada, (1923)
- The Twist And Other Stories, (1923)
- Conrad Weiser, 1696-1760: Friend Of Colonist And Mohawk, (1945)
- The White Roots Of Peace, (1946)
- The Muhlenbergs Of Pennsylvania, (1950)
- Milton S Hershey, (1959) (with Katherine Binney Shippen)
- Indians In Pennsylvania, (1961/81)
- Pennsylvania - Seed Of A Nation, (1962)
- Lloyd Mifflin: Painter And Poet Of The Susquehanna, (1965)
- Indian Paths Of Pennsylvania, (1965)
- Lebanon Valley College: A Centennial History, (1966)
- Daniel Boone In PA, (1967)
