= The Sign of the Beaver =

1983 children's novel by Elizabeth George Speare

- First edition
- Author: Elizabeth George Speare
- Language: English
- Genre: Children's historical novel
- Publisher: Houghton Mifflin
- Publication date: February 1983
- Publication place: United States
- Media type: Print (Hardback & Paperback) & Audio Book
- Pages: 135
- ISBN: 0-395-33890-5
- OCLC: 9219453
- LC Class: PZ7.S7376 Si 1983

The Sign of the Beaver is a children's historical novel by American author Elizabeth George Speare, which has won numerous literary awards. It was published in February 1983, and has become one of her most famous works.

The idea for this novel came from a factual story that Elizabeth George Speare discovered in Milo, Maine about a young boy who was left alone for a summer in the wilderness and was befriended by a Native American boy named Attean and his grandfather, Saknis. The novel has been adapted into a television film titled Keeping the Promise.

== Plot ==
The novel tells the story of 13-year-old Matthew James "Matt" Hallowell, an 18th-century American settler. He and his father build a log cabin in the wilderness of Maine, then he is left alone to guard it and his family's claim to the land while his father heads back to Quincy, Massachusetts to pick up his mother, sister, and the new baby and bring them back to the cabin. He learns how to survive and deal with difficult situations, getting help from a Native American boy named Attean and his family. When Matt fears his family will not show up, Attean asks him to join the Beaver tribe and move north with them.

== Awards ==
- 1983 Josette Frank Award (won as prize)
- 1984 Christopher Award (won as prize)
- 1984 Booklist Editors' Choice (won)
- 1984 Horn Book Fanfare (won)
- 1984 Scott O'Dell Award for Historical Fiction (won as prize)
- 1984 Newbery Honor book
- 1984 ALA Notable Children's Book citation
- 1984 ALA Best Fiction for Young Adults citation
- 1983–1984 Young Hoosier Book Award (nominee)
- 1989 New York Times Best Book of the Year
