= Mary Q. Steele =

American writer and naturalist (1922–1992)

- Born: Mary Quintard Govan; May 8, 1922; Chattanooga, Tennessee, U.S.
- Died: July 6, 1992 (aged 70); Chapel Hill, North Carolina, U.S.
- Other names: J. N. Darby, Wilson Gage
- Occupation: Writer
- Spouse: William O. Steele

Mary Quintard Govan Steele (May 8, 1922 – July 6, 1992) was an American author and naturalist. She wrote more than 20 books, mainly for children. One of them, Journey Outside, was a Newbery Honor Book. Steele sometimes wrote under the names Wilson Gage and J. N. Darby.

== Biography ==
=== Early life ===
Mary Quintard Govan Steele was born on May 8, 1922, in Chattanooga, Tennessee, to Gilbert and Christine N. Govan. She graduated from the University of Chattanooga.

=== Career ===
Steele wrote in The Living Year, "I did not become a writer, but was born one, waking up in the morning to sort the day into scenes and characters and descriptions." One of her few books for adults, The Living Year: An Almanac for My Survivors (Viking, 1972) features Tennessee natural history.

Steele's first book, The Secret of the Indian Mound, was published in 1958 under the pseudonym Wilson Gage. The Secret of the Fiery Gorge (1960) was her "first work of some interest in the field of the fantastic", according to John Clute. Journey Outside (1969) is science fiction for young adults. Its protagonists "live Underground in Pocket Universe environment" (capitals indicate encyclopedia cross-references).

The Mrs. Gaddy books by Wilson Gage are "fantasies for younger readers". WorldCat libraries report Mathilde and Matilde titles by Mary Q. Steele, in French and Spanish translation.

=== Personal life ===
Steele was married to author William O. Steele. She died on July 6, 1992, in Chapel Hill, North Carolina.

== Selected works ==
- The Secret of the Indian Mound, written as by Wilson Gage, illustrated by Mary Stevens (Cleveland, New York: World Publishing, 1958)
- The Secret of Crossbone Hill, as Gage (1959)
- The Secret of the Fiery Gorge, as Gage (1960)
- Miss Osborne-the-Mop, as Gage (1963)
- Journey Outside, illus. Rocco Negri (1969) – Newbery Medal finalist
- The Living Year: An Almanac for My Survivors (1972), natural history
- The First of the Penguins (1973), science fantasy
- Squash Pie, as Gage (1976)
- Mrs. Gaddy and the Ghost, as Gage (1979)
- Cully Cully and the Bear, as Gage, illus. James Stevenson (1983)
- Anna's Summer Songs, illus. Lena Anderson (1988), poetry
- Anna's Garden Songs, illus. Anderson (1989), poetry

== Papers ==
- Mary Q. Steele collection, 1922–1992. 0.5 linear feet University of Tennessee at Chattanooga.
- Gage Wilson Papers 1976. Collection contains correspondence for Squash Pie. University of Minnesota, Minneapolis. 1 folder.
- Steele, Mary Q. Papers, 1969–1979. University of Minnesota – Twin Cities. c 1.9 linear ft.
- Steele, Mary Q. Mary Quintard Steele collection, undated. Chattanooga-Hamilton County Bicentennial Library 0.3 linear ft. Manuscript and galley proofs of "Living Year" and "First of the Penguins".
