= The Land I Lost =

Book by Quang-Nhuong Huynh

- Front cover
- Author: Quang Nhuong Huynh
- Illustrator: Vo-Dinh Mai
- Language: English
- Genre: Autobiography
- Publisher: Harper & Row
- Publication date: 1982
- Media type: Print
- Pages: 144 PP
- ISBN: 0-06-440183-9
- OCLC: 15188434
- Dewey Decimal: 959.7 21
- LC Class: DS559.92.C46 H88 1986

The Land I Lost is an autobiographical book that centers on the life of the author, Quang Nhuong Huynh. The book was first published by Harper & Row in 1982, and was illustrated by Vo-Dinh Mai. Huynh's second book, Water Buffalo Days, used multiple passages originally published in The Land I Lost, though it focused on the author's childhood rather than his entire life. With the Publication of The Land I Lost and Water Buffalo Days, Huynh became the first Vietnamese to publish fiction and non-fiction in English.

== Awards ==
The Land I Lost won several awards. It received the ALA Notable Children's Book award, the ALA Booklist Editors' Choice award, the Notable Children's Trade Book in the Field of Social Studies (NCSS/CBC), the Library of Congress Children's Books award, the William Allen White Children's Book Award (Kansas), the Friends of American Writers Award, and the Blue Cobra Award. The book was also translated into several different languages including German, French, Spanish, and Catalan.

== Cultural significance ==
The publishing of The Land I Lost had a large impact upon modern culture. The author, Quang Nhuong Huynh was born in My Tho, Vietnam in 1946. After being wounded in the Vietnam War, Huynh traveled to the United States for physical therapy in 1963. Deciding to stay in the U.S. after therapy, Huynh began his writing career with the release of The Land I Lost in 1986. The book became the first book written in English by a Vietnamese author, and after Huynh's second book, he became the first Vietnamese to write both fiction and non-fiction in English.

Awards
Preceded by A Light in the Attic	Winner of the William Allen White Children's Book Award; 1985	Succeeded by Daphne's Book
