= Surviving the Applewhites =

2002 novel by Stephanie S. Tolan

- Cover of Surviving the Applewhites
- Author: Stephanie S. Tolan
- Original title: Surviving the Applewhites
- Cover artist: Laurie Keller (2004 HarperTrophy edition)
- Language: English
- Genre: Fiction
- Publisher: HarperCollins
- Publication date: 2002
- Publication place: United States
- Media type: Hardcover
- Pages: 216
- Awards: Newbery Honor
- ISBN: 0-06-623602-9

Surviving the Applewhites is a 2002 children's novel by Stephanie S. Tolan. It was published by HarperCollins in the United States, with cover art by Laurie Keller. The book received a 2003 Newbery Honor.

== Summary ==
Thirteen-year-old Jake has been kicked out of every public school in Rhode Island and burned down the last school that he attended. Both of his parents are in jail due to growing marijuana in their basement, leading to Jake struggling to make sense of the world and discover his true self amid the turmoil of his family life. Following his arsonist incident, Jake's grandfather, Henry Dugan is fed up with his teenage rebelliousness. Dugan arranges for Jake's placement in a home school run by an eccentric family of artists, the Applewhites. Their educational framework, trademarked as The Creative Academy, is unorthodox. Jake has challenges navigating academic, social, and emotional life among the offbeat Applewhites. He becomes acquainted with E.D., the 12-year-old child of the Applewhite family, and together, they recognize their differences, build on each other's strengths, and find ways to succeed.

== Characters ==
Jake Semple is unsure about his feelings because his parents are in prison, and he has been expelled from several schools. If Jake does not adjust to life with the Applewhites, he will be placed in a juvenile detention facility.

Edith Wharton "E.D." Applewhite is named after novelist Edith Wharton, and thrives on a sense of organization and structure, while the rest of her family is spontaneous and craves freedom. She clashes with Jake at the beginning of the book and ends up working with him on several occasions.

Henry Dugan is Jake's grandfather and the Applewhites' neighbor. After attending Lucille's workshop at the middle school, he pushes Jake to "enroll" at The Creative Academy.

Cordelia Applewhite is E.D.'s creative and independent older sister on whom Jake forms a crush.

Randolph Applewhite is the father of the Applewhite children. He is known to be hot-headed and difficult to work with. He has shaggy dark hair and a goatee.

Debbie Applewhite (also known as Sybil Jameson) is the mother of the Applewhite children. She wears glasses and is a famous detective writer. She starts a new book later in the story.

Archie Applewhite is a wood sculptor and the brother of Randolph Applewhite.

Destiny Applewhite is E.D.'s four-year-old brother. He is very active and asks many questions. He forms a friendship with Jake.

Hal Applewhite is E.D.'s reclusive older brother. He is fifteen years old and often holed up in his bedroom, only emerging at night to eat. He is a sculptor for most of the book.

Winston is the family dog who forms an attachment to Jake.

Lucille Applewhite is Archie's wife who came up with the idea to have Jake attend The Creative Academy. A poet, she lives life in a very happy state.

Jeremy Bernstein is a young journalist who stays with the Applewhites to document their artistic endeavors.

Zedediah Applewhite is the father of Randolph and Archie and grandfather to the Applewhite children. The family patriarch, Zedediah works at his own woodshop. He and Archie make wooden furniture.

Govindaswami is Lucille's guru.

== Critical reception ==
On School Library Journal, Faith Brautigam said, "This has terrific book talk and read-aloud potential, and will help fill the need for humorous contemporary fiction." Ilene Cooper said, "She takes a rather predictable plot (the tough kid is tamed by exposure to a good family), and twists it into a screwball comedy that pushes the story to a whole new place on a booklist."

== Awards ==
Surviving the Applewhites was named a Newbery Honor book in 2003 and ALA Booklist Editors’ choice and Book Links Lasting Connection.

== Sequels ==
Tolan wrote two sequels to the book: Applewhites At Wit's End (published on May 8, 2012) and Applewhites Coast to Coast with her son R.J. Tolan (published on October 17, 2017).

Awards
| Preceded by Jack Mandelbaum | Winner of the William Allen White Children's Book Award; Grades 6–8; 2005 | Succeeded by The City of Ember |
