= Christine N. Govan =

American novelist

Christine Noble Govan
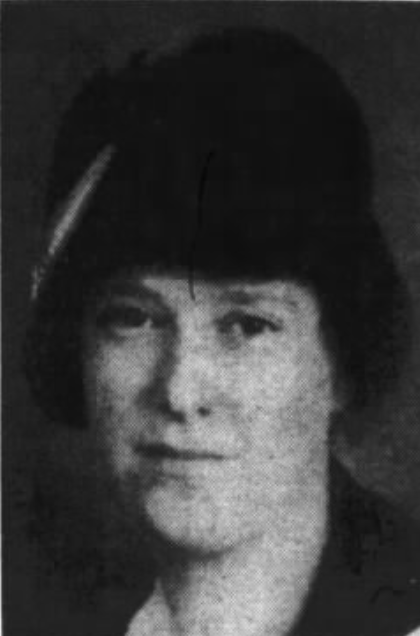
- Govan, 1937
- Born: Mary Christine Noble; December 12, 1897; Manhattan, New York
- Died: February 28, 1985 (aged 87); Lookout Mountain, Tennessee
- Occupation: Author
- Spouse: Dr. Gilbert Govan
- Children: Mary Q. Steele, Emmy Payne

Christine Noble Govan (pen names Mary Allerton and J. N. Darby; December 12, 1897 – February 28, 1985) was an American writer. She was born in New York City and lived most of her life in Chattanooga, Tennessee.

== Early life ==
Mary Christine Noble was born on December 12, 1897, in Manhattan, New York to Mary Helen (née Quintard) and Stephen E. Noble. Her father died when she was four years old and the family moved to Sewanee, Tennessee, because her maternal great-uncle Charles Todd Quintard lived there. They moved again, to Franklin, where in 1904, her mother remarried to Charles W. Elmore, and then once more to Nashville, where she lived with her brother, Samuel, and half-brother, Francis. The family then moved to Chattanooga, where Noble completed her high school education.

== Career ==
Noble enrolled as a scholarship student at the University of Chattanooga, but left school because her family needed her financial support. She was certified to teach first grade and briefly taught at a rural one-room school. On 10 June 1918, she married Gilbert E. Govan, a bookstore owner, originally from Atlanta, Georgia. with whom she had three children: Emily "Emmy" (author of Katy No-Pocket), Mary, and James. Between raising her children and taking care of her home and garden, Govan worked briefly as a librarian and then began to write. Many of her books were autobiographical. Early in her career, she set a goal to publish two books per year.

Govan's body of work included juvenile fiction, biography and history and throughout her career, she published more than 50 books. An early member of the NAACP, she supported the civil rights movement and her trilogy The Plummer Children focused on interracial friendships. In addition to publishing in her own name, Govan used the pen names Mary Allerton and J. N. Darby and co-authored 25 books with her daughter, Emmy Payne Govan (later West). Several of her books became best sellers. Among the most known were Judy and Chris, The Pink Maple House, Those Plummer Children, and String and the No-Tail Cat, and editions were published in Denmark, England, Germany, Japan and Sweden. In addition to writing literature, she was a popular lecturer and wrote book reviews for The Chattanooga Times.

== Death and legacy ==
Govan died on February 28, 1985, at her home in Lookout Mountain, Tennessee. Posthumously, in 1998, Govan was inducted into the Williamson County Authors' Hall of Fame in Franklin, Tennessee. Some of her writing papers are housed at the McCain Library and Archives in the de Grummond Children's Literature Collection in Hattiesburg, Mississippi. Both of her daughters, Emily and Mary, became noted writers and her son, James became a librarian, at one time serving as the head of the University of North Carolina at Chapel Hill Libraries. The papers of the Govan family are located at the University of Tennessee at Chattanooga.

== Partial bibliography ==
=== Novels ===
- The Plummer Children:
  - Those Plummer Children (1934)
  - Judy and Chris (1936)
  - Narcissus An' De Chillun (1938)
- Five at Ashefield (1935)
- Murder on the Mountain (1937)
- Murder in the House with the Blue Eyes (1939) as J. N. Darby
- Sweet 'Possum Valley (1940)
- Jennifer's House (1944)
- The Pink Maple House (1950)
- The Delectable Mountain (1962)
- Danger Downriver (1973)

=== Short stories ===
- "Miss Winters and the Wind", republished in Timeless Stories for Today and Tomorrow
