= Runt (novel) =

2002 novel by Marion Dane Bauer

- Author: Marion Dane Bauer
- Language: English
- Genre: Children's literature
- Publisher: Clarion Books
- Publication date: October 21, 2002
- Publication place: United States
- Pages: 131
- ISBN: 978-0-618-21261-3
- OCLC: 49558730
- LC Class: PZ10.3.B317 Ru 2002

Runt is a 2002 children's novel written by Marion Dane Bauer. It tells of a story about a wolf pup who is a runt.

== Summary ==
One spring day in the forests of Minnesota, a litter of five is born into a wolf pack led by King and his mate Silver. The first four pups are named Leader, Sniffer, Runner, and Thinker. The last pup is much smaller than the others; his disgusted father gives him the name Runt. His mother assures Runt that someday his father will think of a better name.

As Runt grows older, he gets bigger, but he is still smaller than the others. At one point in Runt's life, he and Thinker mess with a porcupine, who attacks them with quills. They get back to the pack, badly wounded; Thinker soon dies from a quill through his eye, which angers King. Human wildlife rescuers trap Runt and remove the quills, before releasing him. He later meets their dog, Goldie, and, unable to understand domestication, futilely tries to get her to come with him.

Runt thinks he will be renamed twice during the book; once, he imagines the name "Brave One" when he howls at the humans, and later he thinks he will be called "Provider" when he brings back the tail of a cow. However, he is not renamed, or respected, and even snubbed for a time since he smells like human, much to his chagrin. He wanders off with Bider, the pack outcast, but soon learns the dangers of living away from a pack's collective wisdom when Bider dies eating meat a farmer has poisoned.

As he is wandering, Runt finds an old moose weak enough to be hunted. He howls to call the other wolves to tell them of the massive meal. He is able to contact them, and his father renames him "Singer". Finally secure in his identity, Singer rejoins the pack.

== Characters ==
- Runt/Singer: The protagonist of the book. A black pup with a white star on his chest (just like his father, King), Runt is the youngest and smallest pup born to King and Silver. He eventually gets his name "Singer" for howling, which he did not do during the majority of the book, after his brother Thinker died. Before being christened with said name, Runt thought he would get the name "Brave One" (when he howled at humans) and "Provider" (when he brought back the tail of a cow).
- King: The alpha male of Runt's pack as well as the father of Runt, Helper, Hunter, Leader, Sniffer, Runner, and Thinker. King is strongly against the idea of hunting down cows, much to Bider's chagrin. He is the mate of Silver. He is aggressive and difficult to please, but shows mercy to Bider when he challenges King but fails.
- Silver: The Mate of King, Silver gets her name from her silvery gray pelt. She is the mother of Runt, Leader, Sniffer, Thinker, Runner, Helper, Hunter, and two little pups who died before they came out of the den. She is sympathetic to her young son.
- Other Pack King: Runt mistakes him for his mother at one point and follows him into his territory. His pack is near King's territory. He decides to allow Runt to return home, but marks the trees near where Runt was wandering to warn him and the other wolves not to trespass again.
- Bider: A white wolf who is the outcast of the pack. He fights with King over whether or not the pack should hunt cows and anger the humans, and is banished. His name comes from the fact he is "biding his time" to take over from King. He dies eating meat that a farmer poisoned to catch him.
- Goldie: A dog owned by the humans who rescue Runt. Her name suggests she may be a Golden Retriever or yellow Labrador Retriever. She is kind to Runt but does not understand his idea of "freedom". Runt later flees when he sees the humans put her on a chain.
- Thinker: Runt's brother. He is the smartest of the litter, and dies slowly when a porcupine impales him with its quills.

== Reception ==
Publishers Weekly described the book as a "tightly plotted, swiftly paced tale", while the School Library Journal called it "[b]eautifully written". In a starred review, Booklist said it was a "compelling, poignant story" and that "Bauer precisely and vividly conveys the wolves' wild world".
