= Herlong (surname) =

Herlong is a surname. Notable people with the surname include:

- Bertram Nelson Herlong (1934–2011), bishop
- Henry Michael Herlong Jr. (born 1944), American judge
- M. H. Herlong, author of the 2012 novel Buddy
- Syd Herlong (1909–1995), American politician
