= Marion Dane Bauer =

American children's author

Marion Dane Bauer (born November 20, 1938) is an American children's author.

Bauer was born on November 20, 1938, and brought up in Oglesby, a small prairie town in Northern Illinois. She was educated at LaSalle-Peru-Oglesby Junior College, the University of Missouri and the University of Oklahoma, where she graduated in 1962. She married Ronald Bauer, raising their two children as well as being a foster parent for other children. That marriage ended in divorce after 28 years. She has taught English at a Wisconsin high school and classes in creative writing in Minnesota. Marion was one of the founders of the Master of Fine Arts in Writing for Children and Young Adults at the Vermont College of Fine Arts. She lives and works in Saint Paul, Minnesota.

Marion wanted to be a writer from an early age. As a child, she says, "I constantly made [stories] up in my head, for my dolls, for my friends. I acted them out using my cigar box filled with marbles as characters." An aunt gave her vital encouragement during her teenage years, by taking her work seriously and urging her to continue writing. Bauer recalls that "the example of someone who loved writing and found doing it both good and important, probably influenced me more deeply than any other."

== Recognition ==
Rain of Fire (1983) won the Jane Addams Children's Book Award in 1984. On My Honor (1986) was a Newbery Honor Book in 1987 and won the William Allen White Children's Book Award in 1989. Am I Blue, an anthology of children's fiction about gay and lesbian issues, won a Lambda Literary Award in 1994, and the Stonewall Book Award for literature in 1995. Bauer received the Kerlan Award in 1996. The Longest Night (2009) won a 2010 Golden Kite Award for picture-book text.

== Books ==
- Shelter from the Wind, 1976
- Foster Child, 1977
- Tangled Butterfly, 1980
- Rain of Fire, 1983
- Like Mother, Like Daughter, 1985
- On My Honor (Newbery Medal Winner), 1986
- Touch the Moon, 1987
- A Dream of Queens and Castles, 1990
- Face to Face, 1991
- What's Your Story?: a young person's guide to writing fiction, 1992
- Ghost Eye, 1992
- A Taste of Smoke, 1993
- (ed.) Am I Blue?: coming out from the silence, 1994
- A Question of Trust, 1994
- A Writer's Story: From Life to Fiction, 1995
- When I Go Camping with Grandma, 1995
- Our Stories, A Fiction Workshop for Young Authors, 1996
- If You Were Born a Kitten, 1997
- Alison's Wings, 1997
- Alison's Puppy, 1997
- Alison's Fierce and Ugly Halloween, 1997
- Turtle Dreams, 1997
- Christmas in the Forest, 1998
- Bear's Hiccups, 1998
- An Early Winter, 1999
- Sleep, Little One, Sleep, 1999
- The Double Digit Club, 2000
- Grandmother's Song, 2000
- Jason's Bears, 2000
- My Mother is Mine, 2001
- If you Had a Nose Like an Elephant's Trunk, 2001
- Runt, 2002
- The Kissing Monster, 2002
- Uh-Oh!, 2002
- Frog's Best Friend, 2002
- Love Song for a Baby, 2002
- Land of the Buffalo Bones: the diary of Mary Ann Elizabeth Rodgers, an English girl in Minnesota, 2003. In the Dear America series.
- Snow, 2003
- Wind, 2003
- Why Do Kittens Purr?, 2003
- Toes, Ears & Nose! 2003
- The Double-Digit Club, 2004
- The Very Best Daddy of All, 2004
- A Mama for Owen, 2004
- Clouds, 2004
- Rain, 2004
- A Bear Named Trouble, 2005
- The Blue Ghost, 2005
- Easter is Coming, 2005
- A Recipe for Valentine's Day, 2005
- Waiting for Christmas, 2005
- If Frogs Made Weather, 2005
- Niagara Falls, 2006
- The Rocky Mountains, 2006
- The Grand Canyon, 2006
- Christmas Lights, 2006
- I'm Not Afraid of Halloween!, 2006
- The Statue of Liberty, 2007
- Mount Rushmore, 2007
- The Mighty Mississippi, 2007
- The Secret of the Painted House, 2007
- Killing Miss Kitty and Other Sins, 2007
- Baby Bear Discovers the World, 2007
- A Mama for Owen, 2007
- The Red Ghost, 2008
- The Green Ghost, 2008
- Some Babies Are Wild, 2008
- Yellowstone, 2008
- Volcano!, 2008
- Flood!, 2008
- Earthquake!, 2009
- The Very Little Princess, 2009
- The Christmas Baby, 2009
- Martin Luther King, Jr. - My First Biography, 2009
- The Longest Night, 2009
- One Brown Bunny, 2009
- How Do I Love You?, 2009
- Cutest Critter, 2010
- Christopher Columbus - My First Biography, 2010
- Harriet Tubman - My First Biography, 2010
- Thank You for Me!, 2010
- The Longest Night, 2011
- In Like a Lion, Out Like a Lamb, 2011
- Benjamin Franklin - My First Biography, 2011
- The Golden Ghost, 2011
- The Very Little Princess - Rose's Story, 2011
- The Very Little Princess - Zoey's Story, 2011
- Dinosaur Thunder, 2012
- Halloween Forest, 2012
- Little Dog, Lost, 2012
- Celebrating Arizona, 2013
- Celebrating Texas, 2013
- Celebrating New York, 2013
- Celebrating Florida, 2013
- Celebrating California, 2013
- Celebrating Virginia and Washington, D.C., 2013
- Celebrating North Carolina, 2014
- Celebrating Washington State, 2014
- Celebrating Massachusetts, 2014
- Celebrating Illinois, 2014
- Crinkle, Crackle, Crack, It's Spring, 2015
- Little Cat's Luck, 2016
- Sun, 2016
- Rainbow, 2016
- Winter Dance, 2017
- Jump Little Wood Ducks, 2017
- The Stuff of Stars, 2018
- The Appalachian Trail, 2020
- Sunshine, 2021
- Moon - Our Universe Series, 2021
- Mars - Our Universe Series, 2021
- Earth - Our Universe Series, 2021
- The Animals Speak, 2021
- The Night Sky - Our Universe Series, 2023
- We, the Curious Ones, 2023
- The Solar System - Our Universe Series, 2024

== Additional Sources ==
- Day, Frances Ann (2000). Lesbian and Gay Voices: An Annotated Bibliography and Guide to Literature for Children And Young Adults. Greenwood Press. pp. 178–180. ISBN 0-313-31162-5.
