= Francis Kalnay =

- Born: July 18, 1899; Budapest, Hungary
- Died: December 2, 1992 (aged 93)
- Occupation: Writer
- Writing career
- Genre: Children's Literature
- Subject: Hungarian

Francis Kalnay (July 18, 1899 – December 2, 1992) was an American children's book author. He was born in Budapest, Hungary and moved to the United States in 1919, where he settled in Carmel, California. He is the author of Chucaro: Wild Pony of the Pampa, which won a Newbery Honor in 1959. He also wrote The Richest Boy in the World (Harcourt Brace, 1959; Angel Press, 1977).

Kalnay was head of an espionage unit for the Allied Forces during World War II, and worked for the OSS, where he was one of the few foreign-born Americans briefed on the ULTRA decrypts. He also recruited Yugoslavian intelligence agents, but was suspected of Communist leanings by the top brass. He later relocated to Argentina. A secular Jew, several of his family members were killed by Hungarian Nazis.
