= Margot Benary-Isbert =

Margot Benary-Isbert (December 2, 1889 – May 27, 1979) born Margot Isbert, was a German and later an American writer of children's books.

== Life in Germany ==
Benary-Isbert was born in Saarbrücken, in the Rhine Province of the Kingdom of Prussia, and raised in Frankfurt am Main, part of the German Empire but outside the Kingdom. She enjoyed telling stories and a schoolteacher recommended writing them up as fiction rather than sounding like lies; her first story was published when she was 19. She attended the College St. Carolus and the University of Frankfurt briefly and worked as a secretary at the Museum of Ethnology and Anthropology in Frankfurt from 1910 to 1917. In 1917 she married Wilhelm Benary, a psychologist. They moved to a farm house in Erfurt where William ran the family business. Margot raised Great Danes for a time.

== World War II ==
During the War Margot raised animals for food. Erfurt was captured by the U.S. Army in April but it became part of the Soviet Zone of Occupation and the Benary-Isberts moved to near Göttingen, not far but in the British Zone that later became West Germany. They shared an apartment with two other families, where Margot wrote Die Arche Noah (The Ark). Many of her books featured post-war Germany and a common theme was the capability of people, especially children, "to rise above almost impossible odds to build new lives for themselves".

The Benary-Isberts moved to the U.S. in 1952, first to Chicago and later to Santa Barbara, California. Margot became an American citizen in 1957 and worked as a writer until her death in 1979.

== Writing ==
Most of Benary-Isbert's books were written and published originally in German; some were later translated into English and published again.

Benary-Isbert is known for her "depictions of humane, realistic characters". A reviewer for the Times Literary Supplement wrote that, "Benary's people are people; they are solid, real characters and their lives and their hopes and their sorrows matter to the reader." Her narratives are admired for being richly detailed and of a consistently high quality, perhaps higher than many other books in the same genre of the time.

Margot Benary-Isbert died on May 27, 1979, in Santa Barbara. Her cousin was the German author and nonfiction writer Otto Albrecht Isbert (1901-1986).

== Awards ==
- First prize at the New York Herald Tribune Spring Book Festival in 1953 for The Ark
- Jane Addams Children's Book Award from the Women's International League for Peace and Freedom in 1957 for Annegret und Cara

== Works (English titles) ==
- The Ark (1953)
- Rowan Farm (1954)
- The Shooting Star (1954)
- The Wicked Enchantment (1955)
- Castle on the Border (1956)
- Blue Mystery (1957)
- The Long Way Home (1959)
- Dangerous Spring (1961)
- A Time to Love (1962)
- Under a Changing Moon (1964)
- These Vintage Years (1968)
