= Buddy (Herlong novel) =

2012 novel by M.H. Herlong

- First edition
- Author: M.H. Herlong
- Language: English
- Published: September 13, 2012
- Publisher: Viking Press
- Publication place: United States
- ISBN: 978-0-670-01403-3

Buddy is a children's novel by American author M. H. Herlong about a family and a dog affected by Hurricane Katrina. It was first published in 2012 and won the award for William Allen White Children's Book Award in 2015 (Grades 6–8).

== Background ==
The author is a long-term resident of New Orleans and was evacuated with her family at the time of the hurricane. She recalled that many people left pets behind as they expected to be absent only a couple of days, as was usual with evacuations.

== Plot ==
Tyrone "Li'l T" Roberts meets Buddy when his family's car unintentionally hits the stray dog on their way to church. Buddy ends up being the pet dog Li'l T's constantly wanted, until Hurricane Katrina comes to New Orleans and he needs to leave Buddy. After the tempest, Li'l T and his dad return home to discover a group attempting to reconstruct their lives, and Buddy gone. Yet, Li'l T declines to surrender his mission to locate his closest companion.

== Characters ==
- Tyrone "Li'l T" Elijah Roberts
- Tanya – Li'l T's young sister
- Baby Terrell – Li'l T's young brother
- Tyrone – Li'l T's Dad
- Mama – Li'l T's Mom
- Grandpa T – Li'l T's Grandpa
- Buddy - Li'l T's Dog
- Brian - the new owner of Buddy
- Brian's Mother

== Reception ==
A reviewer for The New York Times wrote "What makes "Buddy" memorable is not just the tale of a boy's fierce love for his dog but its harrowing portrayal of one of this nation's most traumatic natural disasters. From start to finish, "Buddy" is a testament to the human capacity to endure, to find hope in the sodden ruins of destroyed lives.".

Kirkus Reviews wrote "A touching tale of hope, of holding on when you can, and of letting go when it’s the right thing to do."

Buddy has also been reviewed by Horn Book Guides, School Library Journal, and Library Media Connection.

Awards
Preceded by Hidden	Winner of the William Allen White Children's Book Award; Grades 6–8; 2015	Succeeded by Escape from Mr. Lemoncello's Library
