= The Witch of Blackbird Pond =

1958 novel by Elizabeth George Speare

- 1958 first edition
- Author: Elizabeth George Speare
- Language: English
- Genre: Children's, historical
- Publisher: Houghton Mifflin
- Publication date: December 1, 1958
- Publication place: United States
- Media type: Print (hardback & paperback); Audio
- Pages: 249
- ISBN: 0-395-07114-3 (reissue)
- Preceded by: Calico Captive
- Followed by: The Bronze Bow

The Witch of Blackbird Pond is a children's novel by American author Elizabeth George Speare, published in 1958. The story takes place in late 17th-century New England. It won the Newbery Medal in 1959.

== Plot summary ==
In April 1687, 16-year-old Katherine 'Kit' Tyler leaves her home in Barbados after her grandfather dies to go live with her aunt's family in their Puritan community in Wethersfield, Connecticut.

During the journey to Connecticut, she befriends Nathaniel 'Nat' Eaton, son of the captain of the Dolphin, the ship taking her to Wethersfield. The ship stops in Old Saybrook, Connecticut, to pick up passengers, and while returning to the ship in a rowboat, a young girl, Prudence, accidentally drops her doll in the ocean; Kit jumps in and retrieves the doll. The other passengers, including Prudence's mother, Goodwife Cruff, become suspicious of her, as few women in the area know how to swim. Cruff believes Kit is a witch, commenting, "No respectable woman could stay afloat like that."

Arriving in Wethersfield, Kit finds it very different from her previous life, as she is expected to work alongside the rest of the family: her Aunt Rachel Wood, Rachel's husband Matthew, and their daughters Judith and Mercy. Kit is also required to attend the Sabbath church meetings twice each Sunday, which she finds dull. Kit meets a rich young man, William Ashby, who begins courting her, though she does not reciprocate. Judith had hoped to marry William, but she instead turns her attention to John Holbrook, a man Kit met on the Dolphin.

Kit's life improves when she and Mercy begin teaching village children at dame school. One day, Kit decides the children will reenact the parable of the Good Samaritan. The head of the school, Eleazer Kimberly, arrives and is outraged to find them acting out the Bible, and shuts down the school. In a fit, Kit flees to the meadows near town and meets and befriends the kind and elderly Hannah Tupper, a Quaker outcast and suspected witch. With Hannah's support, Kit convinces Eleazer to give the school another chance.

Kit and Hannah develop a deep bond, even after her uncle forbids Kit from continuing to meet with Hannah. During Kit's secret visits to Hannah's house, Kit teaches Prudence to read from the Bible and practice writing her name in Kit's copybook. Unknown to Kit, Nat is also friends with Hannah, helping her in various ways around her house whenever he's in town. Kit gradually falls in love with Nat during their visits to Hannah's, but Nat is soon banished from Wethersfield for lighting jack-o-lanterns in William Ashby's unfinished house and threatened with lashing if he returns.

When an illness sweeps through the village, afflicting Mercy and killing several village children, a mob gathers to kill Hannah, believing the illness to be witchcraft. Kit rushes to warn her, and the two women escape the mob. Spending the night on the riverbank, Kit flags down the Dolphin when it appears the next morning. Nat takes Hannah aboard and invites Kit to leave with them, but she refuses, explaining that Mercy is gravely ill. Kit returns home to find that Mercy's fever has broken. That night, several townspeople come to arrest her, accusing Kit of being a witch.

During her trial the next day, Kit is asked to explain why her hornbook and copybook, filled with Prudence's name, were in Hannah's house – the townspeople, led by Goodwife Cruff, who believes her daughter is too stupid to have written her own name, fear that Kit was casting a spell on the girl. Kit lies to protect Prudence and says she wrote Prudence's name in the book. Nat appears with Prudence, who testifies that Kit was only teaching her. To demonstrate her literacy, Prudence reads a Bible passage and writes her name. Her father, Goodman Cruff, rebukes his wife's belief that Prudence is incapable of learning; he also convinces the jurors that Kit is innocent of witchcraft, as the Devil would be foolish "to go working against himself" by teaching a child to read the Bible. Kit is exonerated, and her Uncle has Nat's punishment for returning dropped.

Soon after her trial, Kit breaks off her engagement to William and intends to return to Barbados. However, she decides to talk to Nat first after finally realizing that she loves him. Nat returns to Wethersfield with a surprise: he is the captain of a new boat called the Witch, named after Kit. Kit asks to come on board the Witch, but Nat says no, until he gets her Uncle Matthew's permission to marry her.

== Main characters ==
Katherine 'Kit' Tyler
An independent, rebellious, and kind girl who moved with her wealthy family from Barbados to New England
Hannah Tupper
A Quaker and village outcast who is rumored to be a witch
Nathaniel 'Nat' Eaton
First mate of the Dolphin; friend of Hannah Tupper
Rachel Wood
Kit's gentle aunt; the timid wife of Matthew Wood
Matthew Wood
Kit's strict uncle; Rachel's husband and father of Mercy and Judith
Mercy Wood
Kit's compassionate and patient cousin; sister of Judith; daughter of Matthew and Rachel; requires crutches after an illness impacted her mobility
Judith Wood
Kit's haughty cousin; sister of Mercy Wood; daughter of Matthew and Rachel
Prudence Cruff
The Cruff's young daughter who befriends Kit

== Setting ==
The book is set in the Northeastern United States, in the New England town of Wethersfield, Connecticut. A number of locations in the story are real places that are now in the Old Wethersfield district of modern-day Wethersfield:

- Blackbird Pond, which is now known as Wethersfield Cove
- Great Meadows, which later came under the protection of the Great Meadows Conservation Trust
- First Church of Christ, Wethersfield, a Protestant church on Main Street that is now part of the United Church of Christ
- Buttolph–Williams House, a house on 249 Broad Street that is now preserved as an historic house museum
- Connecticut River, the longest river in New England. With headwaters are in Quebec, the river flows southward, passing between Massachusetts and New Hampshire and then crossing Vermont before it flows through Connecticut and discharges into Long Island Sound

== Reception ==
At the time of the book's publication, Kirkus Reviews said: "Kit's vindication, her gradual integration into the community and the positive effect she has on those about her, combine here in a well documented novel to rival the author's first work, Calico Captive, which received wide acclaim as a work of 'superior historical fiction'." In a retrospective essay about the Newbery Medal-winning books from 1956 to 1965, librarian Carolyn Horovitz wrote of The Witch of Blackbird Pond, Carry On, Mr. Bowditch, Rifles for Watie and The Bronze Bow: "All have value, all are told skilfully. If they lack the qualities of greatness, it is largely because their style has a commercial sameness."

== Stage adaptation ==
Y York was commissioned to adapt The Witch of Blackbird Pond to a children's play. The first production premiered in Seattle in 1996.

Awards
Preceded by Rifles for Watie	Newbery Medal recipient 1959	Succeeded by Onion John
