= Natalie Savage Carlson =

American writer

- Born: October 3, 1906; Kernstown, Virginia, US
- Died: September 23, 1997 (aged 90); Rhode Island, US
- Occupation: writer of children's books
- Writing career
- Notable work: The Family Under the Bridge
- Notable awards: Newbery Honor (1959)

Natalie Savage Carlson (October 3, 1906 – September 23, 1997) was an American writer of children's books. For her lifetime contribution as a children's writer, she was United States nominee for the biennial, international Hans Christian Andersen Award in 1966.

Carlson was born in Kernstown, Virginia, of French Canadian descent, and worked many old family stories and folktales into early books like The Talking Cat and Other Stories of French Canada (1952). Carlson published her first story at age eight on the children's page of the Baltimore Sunday Sun. For The Family Under the Bridge, she was a runner-up for the 1959 Newbery Medal from the professional librarians, which annually recognizes the "most distinguished contribution to American literature for children".

Carlson died on September 23, 1997, in Rhode Island.

== Works ==
- The Talking Cat: and other stories of French Canada, illustrator Roger Duvoisin, Harper, 1952
- Wings Against the Wind, illustrator Mircea Vasiliu, Harper, 1955
- Sashes Red and Blue, illustrator Rita Fava, Harper & Brothers, 1956
- The Happy Orpheline, illustrator Garth Williams, Harper, 1957
- The Family Under the Bridge, illustrator Garth Williams, Harper, 1958; ISBN 978-0-06-440250-7
- A Brother for the Orphelines, illustrator Garth Williams, Harper, 1959
- Evangeline, Pigeon of Paris, illustrator Nicholas Mordvinoff, Harcort Brace Jovanovich, 1960;

reissued as Pigeon of Paris, illustrator Quentin Blake, Scholastic, 1972

- The Tomahawk Family, illustrator Stephen Cook, Harper, 1960 ISBN 0060210966
- The Song of the Lop-Eared Mule, illustrator Janina Domanska, Harper, 1961
- A Pet for the Orphelines, illustrator Fermin Rocker, Harper, 1962
- Carnival in Paris, illustrator Fermin Rocker, Harper & Row, 1962
- Jean-Claude's Island, illustrator Nancy Ekholm Burkert, Harper & Row, 1963.
- School Bell in the Valley, illustrator Gilbert Riswold, Harcourt, 1963, ISBN 978-0-15-270645-6
- The Letter on the Tree, illustrator John Kaufmann, Harper & Row, 1964
- The Orphelines in the Enchanted Castle, illustrator Adriana Saviozzi, Harper, 1964
- The Empty Schoolhouse, illustrator John Kaufman, HarperCollins, 1965, ISBN 978-0-06-020981-0
- Sailor's Choice, illustrator George Loh, Harper & Row, 1966
- Chalou, Harper & Row, 1967, illustrator George Loh, AC 67–10034
- Luigi of the Streets, illustrator Emily Arnold McCully, Harper & Row, 1967
- Ann Aurelia and Dorothy, illustrator Dale Payson, Harper & Row, 1968
- The Half Sisters, illustrator Thomas Di Grazia, Harper & Row, 1970
- Luvvy and the Girls, illustrator Thomas Di Grazia, Harper & Row, 1971
- Marie Louise's Heyday, illustrators Jose Aruego, Ariane Dewey, Scribner, 1975, ISBN 0-684-14360-7
- Runaway Marie Louise, illustrators Jose Aruego, Ariane Dewey, Scribner, 1977, ISBN 978-0-684-15045-1
- The Night the Scarecrow Walked, illustrators Charles Robinson, 1979, ISBN 0-684-16311-X
- King of the Cats, and Other Tales, illustrated by David Frampton, Doubleday, 1980
