= The Family Under the Bridge =

1958 children's novel by Natalie Savage Carlson

- First edition
- Author: Natalie Savage Carlson
- Language: English
- Published: 1958 Harper (HarperCollins)
- Publication place: United States
- Media type: Paperback
- Pages: 128 p.
- ISBN: 9780064402507

The Family Under the Bridge is a 1958 seasonal children's novel by Natalie Savage Carlson. It received a Newbery Honor Award.

== Plot ==
In the early 1900s a Parisian hobo named Armand dislikes children; but after meeting three children, Suzy, Evelyn, and Paul and their mother – he reluctantly allows them to share his space under a bridge in Paris during the Christmas season. Their ingenuity and talent helps them feed themselves, and he soon becomes attached to the children and determines to provide a home for them. Eventually, he becomes a hardworking man.

== Awards ==
- Newbery Honor (1959)
- A Horn Book Fanfare Best Book (1959)
