= Chucaro: Wild Pony of the Pampa =

1958 book

- First edition (publ. Harcourt Brace)
- Author: Francis Kalnay
- Illustrator: Julian De Miskey
- Publication date: 1958
- Awards: Newbery Honor (1959)

Chúcaro: Wild Pony of the Pampa (1958) is a book written by Francis Kalnay and illustrated by Julian De Miskey. It won Newbery Honor in 1959. Though it is a fictional story, it also provides informative insights into the lives of South American gauchos on the pampas, describing their daily work, clothing, food, and forms of recreation.

== Plot ==
The story is about a friendship between a twelve-year-old boy called Pedrito and his pony Chucaro and it transpired in a big estancia in Argentina. The latter was once a wild horse on the pampa before he was captured by Pedrito and his gaucho friend Juan when it wandered to graze on a spot near their home. One day, one of the patrons of Pedrito's family purchased a horse and he demanded a gentle animal for his spoiled and cruel son and it was Chucaro he chose despite Pedrito's determination to keep him.

While the book is about the story of a boy meeting a horse and the adventures that came off of it, it is also a tale that describes the life of the loving people of the Argentine pampas and the place that they live in.

== Awards ==
In 1959, the book won the Newbery Honor Book award. It was also the winner of the New York Herald Tribune's Spring Festival Award for books ages 8 to 12.
