= Quang Nhuong Huynh =

Vietnamese-born American author

- Born: August 22, 1946; Vietnam
- Died: 2001 (aged 54–55)
- Occupations: Writer, playwright
- Writing career
- Notable works: Water Buffalo Days, The Land I Lost

Quang Nhuong Huynh (August 22, 1946—2001) was a Vietnamese-born American author. He wrote two books, and has received several awards for his autobiographical work The Land I Lost. Huynh is credited as being the first Vietnamese author to write fiction and non-fiction in English.

== Biography ==
Huynh was born August 22, 1941, in My Tho, Vietnam to the parents Huynh Miu Van, and Kiem Thi. Huynh then enrolled in Saigon University for chemistry, earning his degree in 1962. After the outbreak of the Vietnam War, Huynh was drafted into the South Vietnamese army, where he reached the rank of first lieutenant, and received a gold and a silver medal. Huynh was shot and paralyzed during the war, resulting in his trip to the United States in 1963 for physical therapy.

Huynh decided to stay in the United States, and earned an M.A. in Comparative Literature in 1971 from Long Island University, and in 1973 he got an M.A. in French from the University of Missouri in Columbia, Missouri. His writing career was then begun when his book The Land I Lost was published in 1982. The book won several awards, and was translated into several languages. In the early 1990s, Huynh also had some success as a playwright, and in 1990 he was awarded a Creative Writing Fellowship from the National Endowment for the Arts.

In 1997, Huynh published his other book that was titled Water Buffalo Days. Similar to The Land I Lost, the book focused on his life – more specifically his childhood. Four years later, Huynh died. He was the first Vietnamese to write fiction and non-fiction in English.

== Awards and recognition ==
Huynh's first book, The Land I Lost, won several awards. It received the ALA Notable Children's Book award, the ALA Booklist Editors' Choice award, the Notable Children's Trade Book in the Field of Social Studies (NCSS/CBC), the Library of Congress Children's Books award, the William Allen White Children's Book Award (Kansas), the Friends of American Writers Award, and the Blue Cobra Award. In 1990, Huynh received a Creative Writing Fellowship from the National Endowment for the Arts.
