= Harold Keith =

American author (1903–1998)

Harold Verne Keith (April 8, 1903 – February 24, 1998) was a Newbery Medal-winning American writer. Keith was born and raised in Oklahoma, where he also lived and died. The state was his abiding passion and he used Oklahoma as the setting for most of his sixteen published books.

== Early life and education ==
Harold Keith was born on April 8, 1903, in Lambert, Oklahoma Territory to Malcom A. and Arlyn Lee Keith. Keith published his first written work, a short story, in Lone Scout magazine in 1917, when he was 14 years old. Keith graduated Lambert High School in 1921. He attended Northwestern State Teachers College (later renamed as Northwestern Oklahoma State University) and the University of Oklahoma, earning a bachelor's degree in history from the latter in 1929, and a master's in history in 1938. Keith was also sports editor for the student newspaper during his studies at the University of Oklahoma starting in 1930. During the work for his master's thesis he interviewed 22 veterans of the Civil War who lived in the area, titling his thesis as: Clem Rogers and His Influence on Oklahoma History.

== Career ==
From 1922 to 1923, he was a teacher in the Aorita Consolidated School System. Keith served as the University of Oklahoma first sports publicist from 1930 to 1969. During his tenure at the University of Oklahoma, Keith collected a variety of sports information honors. Keith retired from work at the University of Oklahoma to become a full-time writer, which remained his profession for the rest of his life. In 1987 he was inducted into the Oklahoma Sports Hall of Fame.

A champion long-distance runner for Sooner coach John Jacobs in 1928, Keith had a continuing interest in running which continued long into retirement. He died in Norman, Oklahoma, of congestive heart failure on February 24, 1998, just before the publication and printing of his last book, Chico and Dan.

== Legacy ==
Keith was awarded the 1958 Newbery Medal for his historical novel Rifles for Watie, which is based on the interviews he conducted for his Master's thesis. Rifles for Watie also won the 1964 Lewis Carroll Shelf Award.

On May 3, 2015, Norman Public Library Central was added to the United For Libraries Literary Landmarks Register for displaying Keith's 1958 Newbery Award medal in their children's section of the library since 1993.

The University of Oklahoma libraries' Western History Collection includes the Harold Keith Collection, containing personal records, personal correspondence, professional correspondence, typescripts, manuscripts, financial records, and memorabilia from 1900 to 1993. The collection consists of 20 boxes plus an oversized items collection, which includes such items as artwork by Keith and his children, and full issues of several magazines in which Keith published short stories.

== Works ==
=== Published works ===
- 1917: Short story, published in Lone Scout magazine
- 1937: Will Rogers, a Boy's Life, Pub by Thomas Y. Crowell
- 1941: Sports and Games, Pub by Thomas Y. Crowell
- 1948: Oklahoma Kickoff: An Informal History of the First 25 years of Football at the University of Oklahoma, and the Amusing Hardships That Attended It, self-published by the author in Norman, Oklahoma
- 1951: A Pair of Captains, Pub by Thomas Y. Crowell
- 1957: Rifles for Watie, Pub by Thomas Y. Crowell (1958 Newbery Award)
- 1964: Baptism of Fire, Pub by Science Research Associate
- 1965: Komantcia, Jacket by Thomas Y. Crowell (ISBN B002WWDP10)
- 1971: Brief Garland, Pub by Thomas Y. Crowell (ISBN 0-690-159692)
- 1971: The Runt of Rogers School, Pub by Lippincott (ISBN 0-397-31366-7)
- 1972: Go, Red, go!, Pub by T. Nelson (ISBN 0-8407-6217-8)
- 1976: Sports and Games, Pub by HarperCollins Children's Books; Sixth/Rev edition (ISBN 0-06-192471-7)
- 1976: Susy's Scoundrel, Pub by New American Library (1974 Spur Award)
- 1977: The Obstinate Land: Cherokee Strip Run of 1893, Pub by Thomas Y. Crowell (ISBN 0-690-01319-1)
- 1978: Oklahoma Kickoff: An Informal History of the First 25 Years of Football at the University of Oklahoma, and of the Amusing Hardships That Attended It, Pub by Univ of Oklahoma Pr (ISBN 0-8061-1485-1)
- 1984: Forty-Seven Straight: The Wilkinson Era at Oklahoma, Pub by Univ of Oklahoma Pr (ISBN 0-8061-1898-9)
- 1992: The Sound of Strings: Sequel to Komantcia, Pub by Levite of Apache Pub (ISBN 0-927562-10-3)
- 1998: Chico and Dan, Pub by Eakin Press (ISBN 1-57168-216-3)

=== Cassette recordings ===
- 1999: Rifles for Watie, narrator: Tom Stechschulte, Pub by Recorded Books LLC (ISBN 0-7887-3732-5)
- 1999: Rifles for Watie unabridged, narrator: Tom Stechschulte, Pub by Recorded Books LLC (ISBN 0-7887-3209-9)
