= Men, Microscopes, and Living Things =

1955 book by Katherine Binney Shippen

- First edition
- Author: Katherine Shippen
- Illustrator: Anthony Ravielli
- Language: English
- Genre: Children's literature
- Publisher: Viking Press
- Publication date: 1955
- Publication place: United States
- Media type: Print (Hardback & Paperback)
- Pages: 190 pp

Men, Microscopes, and Living Things is a children's book written by the American author Katherine Shippen and illustrated by Anthony Ravielli. The book was first published in 1955 and is a 1956 Newbery Honor recipient.

== Overview ==
Shippen traces the history of biological thought beginning with Aristotle and followed by Pliny, Linnaeus, Cuvier, Lamarck, Darwin, and several others. The book is 190 pages including a 7-page index.
