= Ann Weil =

American children's author

Ann Yezner Weil
- Born: Ann Yezner; August 31, 1908; Harrisburg, Illinois, USA
- Died: July 31, 1969
- Occupation: Author
- Writing career
- Genre: Children's literature

Ann Yezner Weil (August 31, 1908 – July 31, 1969) was an American writer of children's literature. Her book Red Sails to Capri was a Newbery Honor recipient in 1953.

== Biography ==
Ann Yezner was born in Harrisburg, Illinois, on August 31, 1908. She attended the University of Illinois, Southern Illinois University, and Evansville College, finally settling in Evansville, Indiana. She married Sam Weil in 1930.

Weil wrote her first book, The Silver Fawn, in 1939. Much of her later output consisted of biographies for children. However, Red Sails to Capri, which won her a Newbery Honor in 1953, was a historical fiction novel.

Weil died in 1969. Her papers are held by the University of Southern Mississippi library.
