= Katherine Binney Shippen =

American writer (1892–1980)

- Born: Katherine Binney Shippen; April 1, 1892; Hoboken, New Jersey, USA
- Died: February 20, 1980 (aged 87); Suffern, New York, USA
- Education: Bryn Mawr; Columbia University
- Writing career
- Language: English
- Genre: Children's literature
- Notable works: New Found World; Men, Microscopes, and Living Things
- Notable awards: Newbery Honor

Katherine Binney Shippen (April 1, 1892 – February 20, 1980) was an American history teacher, museum curator, and children's writer.

== Early life and education ==
Shippen was born in Hoboken, New Jersey, on April 1, 1892, to Francis and Ellen Shippen. She earned a B.A. degree from Bryn Mawr College in 1914 and an M.A. from Columbia University in 1929.

== Career ==
While studying for her master's degree, Shippen taught history at the Beard School (now Morristown-Beard School) in Orange, New Jersey (1917–26) and then at The Brearley School in Manhattan borough (1926–35). She then served as the headmistress at Miss Fine's School (now Princeton Day School) in Princeton, New Jersey, for the next nine years. In 1945, the Brooklyn Children's Museum named Shippen curator of the social studies department. In the same year, she published her first book, New Found World. Shippen published 21 books throughout her career and twice won the Newbery Honor Award. Several of her books have been translated into Swedish, German, Polish, Spanish, and Greek editions. She died on February 20, 1980, in Suffern, NY.

== Books ==
Year	Title	Notes
1945	New Found World	1946 Newbery Honor recipient Junior Literary Guild selection
1947	The Great Heritage	Junior Literary Guild selection
1949	The Bright Design	Junior Literary Guild selection
1949	Moses	
1950	Passage to America: the story of the great migrations	
1950	Lightfoot: the story of an Indian boy	
1951	Leif Eriksson, first voyager to America	
1951	A Bridle for Pegasus	
1953	Big Mose	
1954	The pool of knowledge: how the United Nations share their skills	
1954	I Know a City: the story of New York's growth	
1955	Miracle in motion: the story of America's industry	
1955	Men, Microscopes, and Living Things	1955 Newbery Honor recipient; Later published under the title So Many Marvels in 1968
1955	Mr. Bell Invents the Telephone	Reprinted as Alexander Graham Bell Invents the Telephone, 1982
1957	Men of Medicine	
1958	Andrew Carnegie and the Age of Steel	
1958	This Union Cause: The Growth of Organized Labor in America	
1959	Milton S. Hershey	with Paul A. W. Wallace
1963	Portals to the Past: The Story of Archaeology	
1963	The Heritage of Music	with Anca Seidlova
1964	Men of Archaeology	
