= Jennie Lindquist =

American children's author

Jennie Dorothea Lindquist
- Born: March 9, 1899; Manchester, New Hampshire, U.S.
- Died: February 8, 1977 (aged 77); Manchester, New Hampshire, U.S.
- Resting place: Manchester, New Hampshire
- Occupations: Author, editor, librarian
- Writing career
- Language: English
- Genre: Children's literature

Jennie Dorothea Lindquist (March 9, 1899 – February 8, 1977) was an American children's author, editor, and librarian. Her children's novel The Golden Name Day was a Newbery Honor recipient in 1956.

== Biography ==
Lindquist was born in Manchester, New Hampshire, to Swedish immigrants Henning Frederik Lindquist and Jennie Abrahamson. Her mother died two days after Lindquist's birth; as a consequence, Lindquist was raised by her father and his sister, Lottie. Lindquist went on to study at the University of New Hampshire and the Simmons School of Library Science.

In 1922, Lindquist began working at the Manchester City Library as a page. Following a break for further education, she returned to the library as an assistant in the children's department. In 1943, Lindquist moved to Albany, New York, and found employment at the Albany Public Library, first as assistant children's librarian, then as head librarian. In 1944–45, she hosted a radio program, Good Books for Boys and Girls, under the auspices of the University of New Hampshire.

Lindquist began working at The Horn Book in 1948. She was named editor in 1951, and held the position until 1958.

The Golden Name Day, Lindquist's first children's novel, was named a Newbery Honor book in 1956. She later wrote two sequels, The Little Silver House, and The Crystal Tree.

Lindquist later returned to Manchester, where she died in 1977.

Lindquist's papers are held by the State University of New York at Albany library.
