= Better Known as Johnny Appleseed =

First edition (publ. J. B. Lippincott & Co.)

Better Known as Johnny Appleseed is a children's book by Mabel Leigh Hunt. It presents the life and legend of John Chapman, better known as Johnny Appleseed, in nine stories, each named for a variety of apple such as those Johnny planted in the Midwest river valleys. Each story takes him westward from the Youghiogheny to the Mississippi. The first edition was illustrated by James Daugherty. It was published in 1950 and was a Newbery Honor recipient in 1951.
