= Stephanie S. Tolan =

American author of children's books (born 1942)

- Born: 1942 (age 83–84); Ohio, U.S.
- Education: Masters
- Alma mater: Purdue University
- Occupation: Children's author
- Writing career
- Language: English
- Period: 1978–present
- Genre: Children's literature
- Notable work: Surviving the Applewhites
- Notable awards: Newbery Medal Honor
- Website: stephanietolan.com

Stephanie S. Tolan (born 1942, in Ohio) is an American author of children's books. Her book Surviving the Applewhites received a Newbery Honor in 2003. She obtained a master's degree in English at Purdue University. Tolan is a senior fellow at the Institute for Educational Advancement. As of 2015, she lived in Charlotte, North Carolina, with her husband. Her papers are kept at the University of Central Missouri.

== Bibliography ==
=== Children's books ===
- 1978 Grandpa and Me Scribners
- 1980 The Last of Eden, Warne
- 1981 The Liberation of Tansy Warner, Scribners
- 1981 No Safe Harbors
- 1983 The Great Skinner Strike, Atheneum Books
- 1983 A Time to Fly Free
- 1986 Pride of the Peacock, Atheneum
- 1987 The Great Skinner Getaway
- 1987 The Great Skinner Homestead
- 1988 A Good Courage
- 1990 Plague Year, William Morrow
- 1992 The Witch of Maple Park
- 1992 Sophie and the Sidewalk Man
- 1992 March Hooper and the Greatest Treasure in the World
- 1993 Save Halloween William Morrow
- 1994 Who's There?, HarperCollins
- 1996 Welcome to the Ark (Volume 1 of the Ark Trilogy), William Morrow
- 1996 The Great Skinner Enterprise
- 1998 The Face in the Mirror, HarperCollins
- 1999 Ordinary Miracles, HarperTeen
- 2001 Flight of the Raven (Volume 2 of the Ark Trilogy), HarperTeen
- 2002 Surviving the Applewhites 2003 Newbery Honor Book
- 2004 Bartholomew's Blessing
- 2006 Listen!, HarperCollins
- 2009 Wishworks, Inc., Arthur A. Levine Books, ISBN 978-0-545-03154-7
- 2012 Applewhites at Wit's End (Applewhites Family #2)
- 2017 Applewhites Coast to Coast (Applewhites Family #3), with her son R.J. Tolan

=== Books for adults ===
- 2011 Change Your Story, Change Your Life, Createspace. ISBN 978-1-4662-1405-7

=== Adapted works ===
- The Bridge to Terabithia, a theatrical adaption of the 1977 book by Katherine Paterson

=== Contributing author ===
- 2008 Our White House: Looking In, Looking Out, produced by the National Children's Book and Literacy Alliance (various authors/illustrators). Candlewick Press

=== Foreword ===
- 2020 Connected: Intuition and Resonance in Smart People, by Alan D. Thompson.

=== Articles ===
- 2008 "What We May Be: What Dabrowski's Work Can Do for Gifted Adults" (in the book Living With Intensity, edited by Susan Daniels & Michael M. Piechowski)
