= Red Sails to Capri =

1952 children's historical novel

First edition (publ. Viking Juvenile)

Red Sails to Capri is a children's historical novel by Ann Weil. It tells the story of the rediscovery of Capri's Blue Grotto in 1826. The novel, illustrated by C. B. Falls, was first published in 1952 and was a Newbery Honor recipient in 1953.
