= Rifles for Watie =

1957 children's novel by Harold Keith

- Cover of the 1991 HarperCollins reissue hardback
- Author: Harold Keith
- Language: English
- Genre: Historical, War
- Publisher: Thomas Y. Crowell
- Publication date: 1957
- Publication place: United States
- Media type: Print (Hardback & Paperback)

Rifles for Watie is a children's novel by American writer Harold Keith. It was first published in 1957, and received the Newbery Medal the following year.

Set during the American Civil War, the plot revolves around the fictional sixteen-year-old Jefferson Davis Bussey, who is caught up in the events of history. Actual historical personages (e.g. Generals Stand Watie and James G. Blunt) and battles (e.g. Wilson's Creek and Prairie Grove) are seen from the viewpoint of an ordinary soldier, enabled by the choice of protagonist. Harold Keith spent many years interviewing Civil War veterans and visiting the sites depicted in the book, resulting in an authenticity that is rare for historical fiction that targets a young adult audience.

The setting, west of the Mississippi, is also not typical of Civil War novels, so the reader gets a perspective on the war not generally available in other books, let alone one found in children's books.

== Plot summary ==
Amidst an ongoing guerilla war pro-slavery bushwackers raid the Bussey farm in Linn County, Kansas in spring 1861, leading 16-year-old Jefferson Davis Bussey and several friends of his to leave for Fort Leavenworth and enlist as a volunteer for the Union. Jeff takes a mutual dislike to a career officer, Captain Asa Clardy, whose abrasive personality make him both feared and hated by his men. Despite Clardy's vindictiveness, Jeff takes to military life.

Jeff's regiment marches off from Leavenworth to fight. Despite his eagerness, Jeff is repeatedly pulled away for various details and misses several battles. On one such occasion, Jeff resentfully confronts Clardy and taunts him, prompting a warning from fellow volunteer Noah Babbitt, an itinerant printer whom Jeff looks up to for his wisdom and years of experience. Jeff finally sees combat for the first time in the Battle of Prairie Grove; in the chaos following a charge against Confederate infantry, Noah and Jeff aid an undermanned Union artillery battery, firing a cannon as Confederate troops attempt to overrun the battery's position. Days later, Jeff and Noah receive the Medal of Honor for their valor during the battle.

During the campaigning in the contested Indian Territory, Jeff meets headstrong Cherokee girl Lucy Washbourne, whose well-to-do family is loyal to the Confederate cause. Despite their stark differences, Jeff and Lucy gradually grow fond of one another. Lucy's brother Lee is captured while spying on Jeff's regiment and Clardy orders that the boy be executed. Jeff refuses to join the firing squad and arranges for Lee's body to be returned to the Washbournes.

Impressed by Jeff's courage and ability, General James G. Blunt summons him to be assigned as a plainclothes scout. Going behind enemy lines in pairs, Blunt's scouts are assigned to gather intelligence regarding Confederate troop movements and report back. As they cross into Rebel territory in the dark, Jeff and fellow scout Bostwick blunder into a Confederate position and claim they are on their way to join the cavalry raider Stand Watie, only to find his force is camped right there. Left with no other choice, the two follow up on the lie and enlist as Confederate cavalry.

Jeff's name and straightforward manner lead him to develop mutual respect and trust with Watie's men. Jeff is called to join a guard for one of Watie's staff, who has been buying Spencer repeating rifles for Watie from a corrupt Union officer. As the latest shipment of rifles is sold, Jeff recognizes the officer as Clardy and realizes he must escape before Watie can buy enough Spencers to rearm his regiment, but abruptly falls ill and instead sends word ahead via Lemon Jones, an enslaved boy who agrees to escape and take Jeff's report on to General Blunt, hoping to join the U.S. Colored Troops when he gets there.

On leave in a nearby town one night, Jeff happens to meet Lucy and reluctantly tells her he is a spy for the Union. Despite her own loyalties, Lucy agrees to keep his secret. Returning to camp, Jeff stumbles into Clardy and is recognized. Clardy raises the alarm and Jeff goes on the run. Despite steadily growing weaker from lack of rest and food, Jeff keeps heading back toward Union lines as Watie's men chase him with the aid of Sully, a Texas bloodhound. Sully catches Jeff, but quickly takes a liking to him. Seizing on this opportunity, Jeff coaxes Sully into joining him, and the two leave Watie's men behind. Exhausted, Jeff reports in to a Union cavalry patrol and is overjoyed to find one of the troopers is Noah.

Noah reveals that Lemon Jones reached General Blunt, who stopped the supply of Spencer rifles to the enemy. Clardy's real identity is discovered by Watie's men, who take revenge for the execution of Lee Washbourne and rob him of his illicit gold. With the war over, Jeff's regiment disbands and he and his friends from Linn County return home. Lucy sends him a letter, prompting Jeff to decide he will soon propose to her. Returning to his family's farm, Jeff is offered a room but feels restless, instead finding peace outside, under the stars.

== Characters ==
- Jefferson (Jeff) Davis Bussey – the protagonist. Jeff takes a straightforward, no-nonsense view of life and has a deep regard for integrity and courage, but finds the war to be more complicated than he had expected. First enlisted as infantry, Jeff later becomes a cavalryman, artilleryman, and spy. He spends most of the war as a private, but is promoted to sergeant by order of General Blunt before being discharged. Despite taking arms against the Confederacy, Jeff is proud of his name and tolerates no insults against it.
- Lucy Washbourne – Jeff's love interest, a young Cherokee woman living in Tahlequah, Indian Territory. Lucy hails from an upper-class family and conducts herself accordingly, but is fiercely loyal to her family and community and has no patience for insults to either.
- Lee Washbourne – Lucy's brother, a Confederate soldier and scout. Killed by a firing squad organized by Captain Clardy. Lee refused any attempts beforehand to get him to talk, simply laughing at Clardy and his men. Jeff refuses to participate in Lee's execution and arranges for Lee's body to be returned to the Washbournes.
- Noah Babbitt – an itinerant printer, many years older than Jeff, and a Union soldier and a lover of nature. Noah does not take immediately to soldiering and struggles at times to learn new tasks, but displays great courage and resilience through the war, leading Jeff to look up to him as a mentor.
- Stand Watie – historical character, the last Confederate general to surrender at the war's end. A Cherokee chief, his forces are described as "using old British one shot Enfield's and double barrel shotguns." The use of Spencer repeaters could mean a victory against Union soldiers. Greatly feared on the Union side, Watie is beloved by his men and revered by Confederate civilians for the wild and daring way he and his men fight.
- James G. Blunt – historical character, Union general who battled to control Indian Territory. Blunt overlooks Asa Clardy's vindictive complaints about Jeff, particularly after personally seeing Jeff in combat at the Battle of Prairie Grove, and entrusts him with a mission that changes the course of the war in the West.
- David Gardner – Jeff's hometown friend who joins the Union Army with him. Gardner soon regrets his enlistment and deserts, but voluntarily returns after his mother insists. After a lengthy period of punishment details, Gardner joins the Cavalry forces and serves honorably for the remainder of the war.
- John Chadwick – Another of Jeff's hometown friends who joins the Union Army with him.
- Captain Asa Clardy – Jeff's company commander in the Union Army, and a major antagonist against Jeff. He is the one smuggling the Spencer Rifles to the Rebels. Vindictive, cruel, and utterly corrupt, Clardy has no friends on either side and many enemies, all of which eventually catches up to him.
- Heifer Hobbs – company cook and mentor for Jeff in the rebel army of Stand Watie. He stands up for Jeff when Sergeant Fields accuses Jeff of being a Union spy. Heifer's hideous appearance stands in stark contrast to his superb cooking and friendly, compassionate personality, and he is universally liked by Watie's men.
- Bill Earle – A singer who served with Jeff made in the war, on the Union side.
- Stuart Mitchell - A Union P.O.W who was able to escape from Watie's men and enlist in Jeff's unit.
- Pete Millholland – An older gentleman who is elected as Jeff's squad leader. He's killed by Rebels while cooking supper in Choctaw Country.
- Jimmy - The 14-year-old drummer boy for the Union army. Accidentally run over by a Union supply wagon, Jimmy eventually dies on Christmas Day, leaving Jeff his prized drum.
- Edith Bussey - Jeff's mother. Edith is caretaker of the Bussey homestead, steadfast and loyal to her husband and family, even as Emory's well-known abolitionist views make enemies in the Kansas-Missouri region.
- Emory Bussey - Jeff's father, a U.S. Army veteran of the Mexican-American War who served in then-Colonel Jefferson Davis' regiment, continuing to hold Davis in high regard years later, naming his son after Davis. Emory's outspoken honesty and strong abolitionist and Unionist views influence Jeff to volunteer to fight.
- Ring - Jeff's dog in Kansas. Ring is playful and loyal and does not understand when Jeff leaves, but gladly welcomes him home almost four years later.
- Dixie - A dog owned by a rebel who is killed at the Battle of Wilson's Creek. Jeff befriends her and keeps her, later leaving her with Lucy Washbourne.
- Keegan - A commander for the Confederates.
- Lieutenant Orff - Commander of the scout platoon that Jeff and Noah join after becoming cavalrymen. Carries a Spencer 7 shot rifle.
- Sully - A Texas bloodhound brought in to pursue Jeff while the latter is on the run, Sully is considered impossible to escape from once he is on the hunt. Sully is quickly won over after catching Jeff and accompanies him back to the Union side.
- Sergeant Sam Fields - NCO for the company of Confederate cavalry Jeff joins. Fields was a close friend to Lee Washbourne and became embittered toward anyone with Union loyalties after Lee's death.
- Jim Bostwick - a scout that Jeff works with. Killed in a battle while posing as a Confederate.
- Sparrow - An Army cook attached to Jeff's regiment. Sparrow knew Clardy before the war, and reveals to Jeff that Clardy murdered and robbed a widow during a storm. Clardy murders Sparrow after Jeff taunts him with this information, but Noah says Sparrow was not the type who could have kept such a secret.
- Mike Dempsey- Older Irishman who befriends Jeff.
- Ford Ivey- One of Jeff's best friends who was severely wounded during the Battle of Wilson's Creek. He eventually has his leg amputated.
- Zed Tinney- God-fearing boy who owns a bible that is bound in black leather. Killed during the Battle of Wilson's Creek.
- Jake Lonegan- A squad leader in Jeff's company. Jake was one of the sharpest recruits at Leavenworth during their early training and carried himself with a "tough guy" image, but throws down his musket and flees the first time he sees combat.
- Jim Veatch- Cardplayer in Jeff's company.
- Neely North- A breezy recruit from Shawnee Mission.
- Walter Van Ostrand- A frightened youngster in Jeff's company who purposely shot off one of his own fingers with his rifle-musket to avoid having to go into battle. Clardy accused Van Ostrand of cowardice while Van Ostrand insisted it was an accident.

== Reception ==
Kirkus Reviews said of the book: "Stirring, original and always credible, this is distinctly superior." In a retrospective essay about the Newbery Medal-winning books from 1956 to 1965, librarian Carolyn Horovitz wrote of Rifles for Watie, Carry On, Mr. Bowditch, The Witch of Blackbird Pond and The Bronze Bow: "All have value, all are told skilfully. If they lack the qualities of greatness, it is largely because their style has a commercial sameness."

== Controversial history ==
After receiving the 1958 Newbery award, the book was scheduled to be reprinted due to an expected increase in sales. This award brought the attention of librarian Charlemae Hill Rollins of the Chicago Public Library, who saw the opportunity to change certain descriptions of African American characters in the book; the period in which these changes were proposed was during the fall of legal segregation and Rollins believed the language should reflect this. After communicating with Rollins, Keith accepted one proposed change but rejected the others, claiming that he used similar language to define other white characters and for that reason it was not race-specific. The changes made in the third printing of the book did not touch on the characters' use of language because it was deemed that the author was not advancing his own views in the book but instead attempting to accurately reflect common attitudes of the time period.

== Awards and nominations ==
- Winner, 1958 Newbery Medal
- Notable Children's Books of 1957 (ALA)
- 1964 James Carroll Shelf Award

== Sources ==
- Rifles for Watide on Rifles for Watie – via BookRags Study Guides.
- Kingman, Lee, ed. (1965). Newbery and Caldecott Medal Books: 1956-1965. Boston: Horn Book.

Awards
Preceded by Miracles on Maple Hill	Newbery Medal recipient 1958	Succeeded by The Witch of Blackbird Pond
