= The Bronze Bow =

1961 children's historical novel by Elizabeth George Speare

- First edition
- Author: Elizabeth George Speare
- Language: English
- Genre: Children's historical novel
- Publisher: Houghton Mifflin
- Publication date: 1961
- Publication place: United States
- Media type: Print - Hardcover and Paperback
- Pages: 254
- ISBN: 0-395-13719-5
- OCLC: 438473894
- Preceded by: The Witch of Blackbird Pond
- Followed by: Life in Colonial America

The Bronze Bow is a historical fiction book by Elizabeth George Speare that won the Newbery Medal for excellence in American children's literature in 1962.

== Plot ==
This book is set in first century Galilee, Israel. The main character is a young Jew named Daniel bar Jamin who lives at the same time as Jesus of Nazareth.

Daniel's uncle and father are imprisoned by the Romans. Even at eight, he hates and distrusts the Romans and vows that he will avenge his father's death. His mother dies of grief after her husband's death, and Daniel's younger sister, Leah, is traumatized by these events, possessed by demons, and never leaves the mountains. The children are both taken in by their great grandfather twice removed, but as he becomes ill and poor over the years, he sells Daniel to Amalek the blacksmith. Daniel escapes his cruel master, running away to the mountains where he is found close to death and rescued by Rosh, the leader of an outlaw band of rebels, who plan to someday overthrow the Romans. They adopt Daniel into their crew, and Daniel begins a new life in the mountains, trying to forget about his grandmother and sister left behind in the village.

Several years after these events, Daniel meets people he used to know when he lived in Ketzah, Joel bar Hezron and his twin sister Malthace, who climbed the mountain for the holidays. Joel wants to join Rosh's band, so he promises Rosh that he will be a spy in Capernaum, the city to which he is moving.

Rosh sends Daniel out on a mission to capture a slave. The crew names him Samson (a character in the Biblical Book of Judges with immense strength) for his brute strength. Samson doesn't speak their language, but he sees Daniel as his master/friend and follows him. One day, Simon the Zealot, a friend from Daniel's village, comes to tell Daniel his grandmother is dying. He returns to his village of Ketzah and sees his grandmother. She passes away and Daniel is left in charge of Leah. Later, Simon tells Daniel he is going to follow Jesus and leaves Daniel in charge of his shop; Daniel and Leah move to Simon's shop and home.

Now that Daniel remains in the blacksmith shop rather than the mountains with Rosh's crew, Daniel begins recruiting young men who are around his age to rebel against the Romans. They decide on a password, which is from the song of David: 'He trains my hands for war so that my arms can bend a bow of bronze.' They meet in an abandoned watchtower outside of the village and slowly begin rebelling small bits at a time. One day, Rosh gives Joel a mission: he is to find out who is coming to a special banquet thrown for a special legation from Rome. Joel finds out the names by chatting to the servants and slaves of the house, and even after the banquet he continues to do so, passing on any information he can find to Rosh. But soon, Joel is captured. Rosh refuses to help free him, so Daniel and his small band devise a plan to free him themselves. From the top of a cliff, they attack the group of Romans that are escorting the prisoners, but the attack goes wrong. They only succeed because Samson, out of sacrificial love for Daniel, shows up and rolls a boulder down on the attacking Romans and then joins the fight. The boys end up freeing Joel, but one of them dies and many of them are injured. After the fight, Samson is dragged away by the Romans, never to be seen again. Daniel realizes that in rebelling, they had been doing the wrong thing. Instead of weakening Rome, they had weakened themselves. Together, Joel and Daniel realize that Jesus is, perhaps, the leader they had been waiting for.

A young Roman soldier named Marcus, whom Daniel hates, befriends Daniel's sister. Daniel eventually finds out and goes into a fit of rage. Leah, who had seemed to be in the process of being cured, falls back into fully being possessed by her demons.

Jesus heals Leah from her demons, and Daniel realizes that "to know and follow Jesus would be enough". He shows Jesus' love to the Roman soldier. Daniel invites Marcus into his home to see Leah.

== Critical views ==
At the time of the book's publication, Kirkus Reviews said: "The author succeeds admirably in re-entering the era and filling it with entirely human characters... Alive and colorful biblical fare in the well modulated manner of Elizabeth Speare." In a retrospective essay about the Newbery Medal-winning books from 1956 to 1965, librarian Carolyn Horovitz wrote of The Bronze Bow, Carry On, Mr. Bowditch, Rifles for Watie, and The Witch of Blackbird Pond: "All have value, all are told skilfully. If they lack the qualities of greatness, it is largely because their style has a commercial sameness."

The book has been criticized by some Jewish and Christian groups and scholars for a "hostile" depiction of Judaism as practised at that time, an idealised version of Christianity, and for what some believe to be historical inaccuracies.

After critics alleged the book "glorified Jesus and vilified Jews", The Bronze Bow was removed from the social studies reading list of San Rafael City Schools in 2006. The removal prompted protests from some of the district's high school English teachers over "the specter of censorship of the curriculum."

Awards
Preceded by Island of the Blue Dolphins	Newbery Medal recipient 1962	Succeeded by A Wrinkle in Time
