= William O. Steele =

American writer

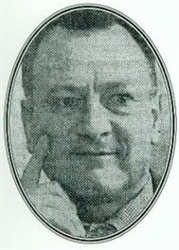
- Photo of American Author William O. Steele
- Born: William Owen Steele; December 22, 1917; Franklin, Tennessee
- Died: June 25, 1979 (aged 61); Signal Mountain, Tennessee
- Education: Attended Cumberland University in Lebanon, Tennessee
- Occupation: Author
- Spouse: Mary Quintard Govan
- Parent(s): Core Steele; Sue Steele

William Owen Steele (December 22, 1917 – June 25, 1979) was an American writer from Tennessee.

== Biography ==
=== Early life ===
William O. Steele was born on December 22, 1917, in Franklin, Tennessee. He was the son of Isore Steele and Susie Lee. Steele spent a large amount of his youth exploring the woods around his home, leading to an interest in the history of the area and of its pioneers. Steele attended Cumberland University.

=== Career ===
Steele wrote 39 books. He wrote his historical adventure stories in his home on Signal Mountain, Tennessee, which was the setting for many of his fiction stories. Steele's book, The Perilous Road, which was published in 1958, won the Newbery Honor in 1959. Winter Danger earned the Lewis Carroll Shelf Award in 1962.

=== Personal life ===
Steele was married to another author, Mary Quintard Govan. He died on June 25, 1979, at age 61.

== Bibliography ==
- The Golden Root (1951)
- The Buffalo Knife (1952)
- Over-Mountain Boy (1952)
- John Sevier Pioneer Boy (1953)
- Wilderness Journey (1953)
- The Story of Daniel Boone (1953)
- Winter Danger (1954)
- The Story of Leif Ericson (1954)
- Tomahawks and Trouble (1955)
- We Were There on the Oregon Trail (1955)
- Davy Crockett's Earthquake (1956)
- De Soto Child of the Sun (1956)
- Lone Hunt (1956)
- We Were There with the Pony Express (1956)
- Daniel Boone's Echo (1957)
- Flaming Arrows (1957)
- The Perilous Road (1958)
- Andy Jackson's Water Well (1959)
- The Far Frontier (1959)
- The Spooky Thing (1960)
- Francis Marion Young Swamp Fox (1962)
- Westward Adventure (1962)
- The Year of the Bloody Sevens (1963)
- The No-Name Man of the Mountain (1964)
- Wayah of the Real People (1964)
- The Trail Through Danger (1965)
- The Tomahawk Border (1966)
- Old Wilderness Road (1968)
- Hound Dog Zip to the Rescue (1970)
- Henry Woodward of Carolina (1972)
- Triple Trouble for Hound Dog Zip (1972)
- Wilderness Tattoo (1972)
- Eye in the Forest (1975)
- John's Secret Treasure (1975)
- The Man with the Silver Eyes (1976)
- Cherokee Crown of Tannassy (1977)
- The Talking Bones (1978)
- War Party (1978)
- The Magic Amulet (1979)
