= Jack Mandelbaum =

Holocaust survivor (1927–2023)

Jack Mandelbaum (born Janek Mandelbaum, April 10, 1927 – August 6, 2023) was a Polish-American Holocaust survivor from Gdynia. His experiences as a boy during World War II were the subject of Andrea Warren's children's book of Mandelbaum surviving in a concentration camp and being separated from his family. This book Surviving Hitler: A Boy in the Nazi Death Camps . talks about how Mandelbaum was in many different concentration camps;and how he considered Gross-Rosen to be the worst of them. Later Mandelbaum learns his father Max Mandelbaum, mother Cesia Mandelbaum, brother Jakob Mandelbaum, sister Jadzia Mandelbaum, and countless other family members were killed in the Holocaust, his only remaining family is his Uncle Sigmund Mandelbaum, Aunt Hinda, and two second cousins on his fathers side. Mandelbaum later met Moniek, a soon to be life long friend, and with him survived the concentration camps and then they later helped other Jewish men and women escape.

Mandelbaum had a wife, Claudia Mandelbaum, 7 children, and 12 grandchildren. He died in Naples, Florida on August 6, 2023, at the age of 96.

== Critical reception of the book ==
Awards for Surviving Hitler: A Boy in the Nazi Death Camps included the 2004 William Allen White Children's Book Award for grades six to eight, the American Library Association's Robert F. Sibert Honor Book for Most Distinguished Informational Book for Children; and Outstanding Children's Book from the American Society of Journalists and Authors
