= Calico Captive =

1957 novel by Elizabeth George Speare

- First edition
- Author: Elizabeth George Speare
- Language: English
- Genre: Children's, Historical novel
- Publisher: Houghton Mifflin
- Publication date: January 1957
- Publication place: United States
- Media type: Print (Hardback & Paperback)
- Pages: 274 pp
- Followed by: The Witch of Blackbird Pond

Calico Captive is Elizabeth George Speare's first historical fiction children's novel, published in 1957. It was inspired by the true story of Susanna Willard Johnson (1730–1810) who, along with her family and younger sister, were kidnapped in an Abenaki Indian raid on Charlestown, New Hampshire in August 1754.

The main events in Calico Captive, which occurred on the brink of the French and Indian War, were taken from Johnson's narrative diary A Narrative of the Captivity of Mrs. Johnson, which was first published in 1796. Calico Captive is told through the eyes of Miriam, Johnson's younger sister, and her imagined adventures.

== Plot summary ==
In August 1754 Miriam Willard, along with her older sister Susanna, her sister's husband James Johnson, and their three children (two-year-old Polly, four-year-old Susanna, and six-year-old Sylvanus), are kidnapped from Number Four, a fort in Charlestown. Miriam and her family are forced to march north by their Indian captors, never knowing whether they will be killed or taken into slavery.

Throughout the journey Miriam finds she cannot keep her mind off Phineas Whitney, her sweetheart planning to attend Harvard College. On the way north, Susanna gives birth to a girl and names the infant Captive. The rugged trail is made far more difficult for Miriam by the miserable crying of Captive, the damp cold and hunger, and the sight of her exhausted sister. Fortunately, a horse named Scoggins is captured for Susanna so that she does not have to walk and carry the infant. Eventually the group reaches the Indian village where, upon surviving a half-hearted gantlet while being forced to dance and sing, they are adopted into the tribe.

After many years the Indian tribe's Sachem decides to sell his English captives to the French in Montréal, Quebec. However, Susanna's master forces her to stay behind and Sylvanus, who has taken a liking to the Indian culture, willingly chooses to go on a hunting trip with the Indians and then stays at a different Indian village. Upon arriving in Montréal Miriam finds to her horror that they are all to be privately purchased off to separate owners and held on ransom. James is thrown in jail for a short time but is finally forced to retrieve money from the English governor to pay for his family's release. Polly captures the interest of the mayor's wife, who is unable to have a child of her own, while little Susanna is sold to another French household and Miriam meets the prominent Du Quesne family.

Although working as a servant, Miriam quickly finds herself living a life she has never imagined. She meets an amiable French girl named Hortense and the two quickly become friends. One day Miriam is asked by Madame Du Quesne to teach her daughter, Felicité, to read and write proper English. Miriam finds she is intrigued by Felicité's friendliness and wealthy lifestyle. Meanwhile, James makes a petition to the French governor and is allowed to return to English territory and ask for money and a passport.

Susanna is eventually released by her Indian captors and joins Miriam. Meanwhile, James goes to Boston to get money in order to buy the liberty of the rest of his family. The two sisters are invited by Felicité to join her at a ball wherein Miriam unintentionally draws the attention of Pierre Laroche, a grandson of a wealthy nobleman. Miriam dances with the young man, which angers and embarrasses Felicité, who had her heart set on marrying Pierre. The Du Quesne family, feeling disgraced and insulted and because they believe James broke his bond and escaped from captivity, throws out Miriam and Susanna.

After several hours in the snowy streets Hortense finds the two and informs them they can stay with her family. Miriam realizes that the Hortense family cannot support three more occupants and conjures a plan to make some money. She decides to use her talent for dressmaking to craft a fashionable dress for Madame Du Quesne and Felicité. The plan works, although she is told to keep her services a secret. However, the governor's wife, Marquise De Vaundreuil, finds out Miriam had designed the Du Quesne dresses and hires her.

When James finally returns the French governor has been replaced. The new authority refuses to recognize the agreement. Worse yet, Polly, who was unable to adjust to her new family, runs away and is eventually allowed to stay with her mother. Instead of earning their freedom Susanna, James, Polly and Captive are thrown in jail. Miriam, as a dressmaker for a notable family, is spared jail time.

Miriam eventually succeeds in gathering her courage and asks Marquise De Vaundreuil about her relatives. Marquise De Vaundreuil promises she will talk with her husband. Meanwhile, Pierre asks Miriam to marry him although, after much consideration, she realizes she truly does not love him.

Marquise De Vaundreuil keeps her promise to speak with her husband and eventually Miriam, Susanna, James, Polly and Captive are released from prison. They board a small sailing vessel to cross the Atlantic to Plymouth, England and from there they sail back to America, finally as free people. Two years later Sylvanus is brought home by a redeemed Indian captive. Another redeemed prisoner from Montréal brings home little Susanna. Phineas Whitney, after graduating from Harvard, marries Miriam.

== Reviews ==
A reviewer for Kirkus Reviews wrote: "The author graces veracity with a selective eye and ear for incident and dialogue." The New York Times book reviewer called Calico Captive a "superior historical romance".

A 2002 review of book reissues in The Horn Book Magazine criticized the novel for its one-sided depiction of Abenaki Indians, which it called "offensive", and concluded that Calico Captive "fails completely in translating to a contemporary audience".
