= Jean Lee Latham =

American writer (1902–1995)

- Born: April 19, 1902; Buckhannon, West Virginia
- Died: June 13, 1995 (aged 93)
- Education: West Virginia Wesleyan College, Ithaca Conservatory, Cornell University
- Writing career
- Subject: Children's literature

Jean Lee Latham (April 19, 1902 – June 13, 1995) was an American writer who specialized in biographies for children or young adults.

== Biography ==
Jean Lee Latham was born in Buckhannon, West Virginia. Her father George R. Latham was a cabinetmaker and her mother Winifred Brown was a teacher. She attended West Virginia Wesleyan College and received an A.B. in 1925. She also attended Ithaca Conservatory. She earned her masters degree from Cornell University in 1930. While in Wesleyan College, she wrote plays. In Ithaca, she taught English, history and play production. She continued teaching in Ithaca after finishing her studies at Cornell.

During World War II Latham trained inspectors for the United States Signal Corps.

Her first book for children was The Story of Eli Whitney. Her book Carry On, Mr. Bowditch won the Newbery Medal in 1956.

WorldCat reports that 12 of her 13 books most widely held in participating libraries are biographies of Bowditch (fictionalized), Eli Whitney, Samuel Morse, Rachel Carson, Elizabeth Blackwell, Francis Drake, Cyrus W. Field, Sam Houston (two, one brief and one fictionalized), David Farragut, John Ericsson, and James Cook. The other, This dear-bought land (1957), features "a fifteen-year-old boy [who] joins the expeditionary force that hopes to establish a permanent English colony in Virginia."

Latham's papers are in the University of Minnesota Libraries collection.

== Awards ==
- Newbery Medal, 1956
