= Carry On, Mr. Bowditch =

1955 children's novel by Jean Lee Latham

- First edition cover
- Author: Jean Lee Latham
- Cover artist: John O'Hara Cosgrave II
- Language: English
- Series: none
- Genre: Children's novel, biographical
- Publisher: Houghton Mifflin
- Publication date: 9 September 1955
- Publication place: United States
- Media type: Print (hardcover & paperback)
- Pages: 251
- ISBN: 0-395-06881-9
- OCLC: 15814480

Carry On, Mr. Bowditch is a 1955 historical fiction biography by Jean Lee Latham about the life of Nathaniel Bowditch, a sailor and mathematician who published the mammoth and comprehensive reference work for seamen: The American Practical Navigator. The book was awarded the Newbery Medal in 1956.

== Plot summary ==
In Revolutionary War–era Salem, Massachusetts, a young Nat Bowditch, the smallest member of a sea-faring family, astounds his schoolteacher with his talent for mathematics. He dreams of someday attending Harvard University but is forced by his family's financial hardships to quit school and work in his father's cooperage. Even that sacrifice is not enough, and his family contracts him into indentured servitude at a chandlery. Determined to continue his education, he uses his nine years as a clerk to teach himself subjects such as trigonometry, calculus, Latin, and French.

Upon the fulfillment of his servitude, he takes a job as a surveyor, which quickly evolves into a career as an officer and supercargo on various merchant ships. Numerous voyages take him to ports around the world and sometimes into brushes with the wars being fought by the newly founded United States. In his duties as a navigator, he discovers that many of the references available contain dangerous errors, and he is compelled to compile a new book of navigational data. His experiences educating crew members serving under him allow Nat to supplement his numeric tables with information that allow sailors with limited educations to learn the trade of navigation. Eventually Nat becomes a captain and faces his greatest navigational challenge of all.

== Reception ==
Kirkus Reviews called the book "A readable biography of the man who was scarcely out of his teens before he had written the authoritative book on navigation still used at Annapolis". In a retrospective essay about the Newbery Medal-winning books from 1956 to 1965, librarian Carolyn Horovitz wrote of Carry On, Mr. Bowditch, Rifles for Watie, The Witch of Blackbird Pond and The Bronze Bow: "All have value, all are told skilfully. If they lack the qualities of greatness, it is largely because their style has a commercial sameness."

Awards
Preceded by The Wheel on the School	Newbery Medal recipient 1956	Succeeded by Miracles on Maple Hill
