= Miracles on Maple Hill =

1956 novel by Virginia Sorensen

- Original 1956 cover
- Author: Virginia Sorensen
- Illustrator: Beth and Joe Krush
- Cover artist: Beth and Joe Krush
- Language: English
- Genre: Children's literature, Historical fiction
- Publisher: Harcourt Children's Books
- Publication date: 1956
- Publication place: United States
- Pages: 180
- ISBN: 0-152-54558-1
- OCLC: 220653

Miracles on Maple Hill is a 1956 novel by Virginia Sorensen that won the 1957 Newbery Medal for excellence in American children's literature. The book was illustrated by Beth and Joe Krush.

The settings and characters for the book were inspired by real people and locations the author encountered during her stay in Edinboro, Pennsylvania between 1952 and 1958.

== Summary ==
Marly's family moves to the country so that her father, a former prisoner of war, can learn to function once more. The family is befriended by a neighbor couple, Mr. and Mrs. Chris, who make their living with maple syrup. Marly and her brother adapt to living in the country. Their father's condition also improves.

== Plot ==
Marly's father just returned from the war; he is suffering from mood swings and depression, and seems to be tired all the time. Lee, Marly's mother, moves the family to Maple Hill, a town where the children's grandmother once lived, so that her husband, Marly's father, will not suffer as much as he would in the city. In Maple Hill, neighbors help one another when help is needed; they do not keep secrets from one another. The family is supported by a neighbor couple, Mr. and Mrs. Chris, who make their living with maple syrup. Marly and her brother adapt to living in the country very well, and eventually become happier there. Their father's condition also improves tremendously.

When Mr. Chris has a heart attack during sugaring time, Marly's family steps forward to return the kindness that the Chrises have shown them. They collect the entire crop of sap and boil it down, but they are certain that they lack Mr. Chris's deft touch with making syrup. When Mr. Chris is allowed to return home, it is the moment of truth: is their syrup as good as Mr. Chris's? Mr. Chris himself is unable to detect any difference. Marly reflects that the recovery of her father and Mr. Chris, the growing strength of bonds within her family, and the second chances for life and love are the true miracles of Maple Hill.

== Characters ==
=== Main characters ===
- Marly, a young girl, the main character, who discovers the miracles of nature at her grandmother's cabin.
- Joe, Marly's older brother who wants to return to the city until he goes through puberty.
- Mr. Chris, the friendly older neighbor and maple farmer who shares the joys of country life with Marly's family.

=== Minor characters ===
- Marly's mom, decides that the family needs an extended stay away from the city at Grandmother's house.
- Marly's dad, a World War II veteran who is physically and spiritually damaged but finds healing in the countryside.
- Mrs. Chris, takes care of the two families and all the remaining farm work.
- Harry, a mysterious hermit eventually befriended by Joe.
- Margie, Marly's best friend

== Audiobook ==
A full cast audio adaptation narrated by Cynthia Bishop was released in 2005 with each character brought to life by a unique personality and voice.

== In popular culture ==
The Hurry Hill Maple Farm Museum located in Edinboro, Pennsylvania has an exhibit dedicated to the book and its author, titled "Miracles on Maple Hill: Where the seasons take on new meaning."

== Description ==
The story, written by Virginia Sorensen, is told in past tense and uses the third person. The words used are simple and easy to understand. They are mostly conversations between Marly and her family, as well as other people in the countryside of Maple Hill. This story includes fourteen chapters and each chapter is very short. The total pages are less than 250.

== Critical reception ==
Miracles on Maple Hill was published to very strong reviews. Kirkus Reviews called it "a complete and realistic family story", while the School Library Journal found it "skillfully dramatized" and an "inspiring American classic". The New York Times Book Review called the book "Warm and real as her two previous books centering about a 10-year-old 'curious Missile' and 'Plain Girl' – this one packed with incident, country magic, family love and people to remember; it has substance and spiritual worth." In a retrospective essay about the Newbery Medal-winning books from 1956 to 1965, librarian Carolyn Horovitz wrote that the book "seems to miss its objective because of a sentimental use of language. I know this author has written better books."

Awards
| Preceded by Carry On, Mr. Bowditch | Newbery Medal recipient 1957 | Succeeded by Rifles for Watie |
