= The Perilous Road =

Book by William O. Steele

- First edition
- Author: William O. Steele
- Cover artist: Illustrated by Paul Galdone
- Language: English
- Genre: Historical novel
- Publisher: Harcourt Brace & World
- Publication date: 1 April 1958
- Publication place: United States
- Media type: Print (Hardback & Paperback)

The Perilous Road is an American Civil War novel by William O. Steele, published in 1958. It was awarded the Newbery Honor.

== Plot overview ==
Chris Brabson is a boy whose family lives in the mountains of eastern Tennessee during the Civil War. His family encounters hard times when cavalry soldiers of the Union Army take most of his family's food and their only plow horse, leaving them little to sustain them through the winter. Chris vows to get even with the Yankees and is determined to fight for the Confederate Army. Chris's brother Jethro, however, has recently joined the Union Army of the Tennessee, forcing Chris to examine his beliefs about war, courage, and tolerance. Jethro's enlistment causes trouble for the Brabson family. Their neighbors, who are Confederate sympathizers, burn down their shed and threaten to do the same to their house.

Though Jethro is a Union soldier, Chris hates the Union troops. When Chris finds out that there is a wagon train in the area, he alerts a friend of his, Silas Agee, who claims to be a Confederate spy. Then he finds out that his brother's job in the Army is as a wagon driver. Chris sets out to warn the wagon train to try to save Jethro's life. When he gets to the wagon train in search of Jethro, he is kindly greeted by Union troops who offer him food and conversation. He begins to change his perspective of the Yankees, having learned that they are not the hateful thieves he once viewed them as.
