= Mabel Leigh Hunt =

American writer (1892–1971)

- Born: November 1, 1892; Coatesville, Indiana, USA
- Died: September 3, 1971 (aged 78); Indianapolis, Indiana, USA
- Education: DePauw University
- Occupation: Children's writer

Mabel Leigh Hunt (November 1, 1892 – September 3, 1971) was an American writer of children's books.

== Biography ==
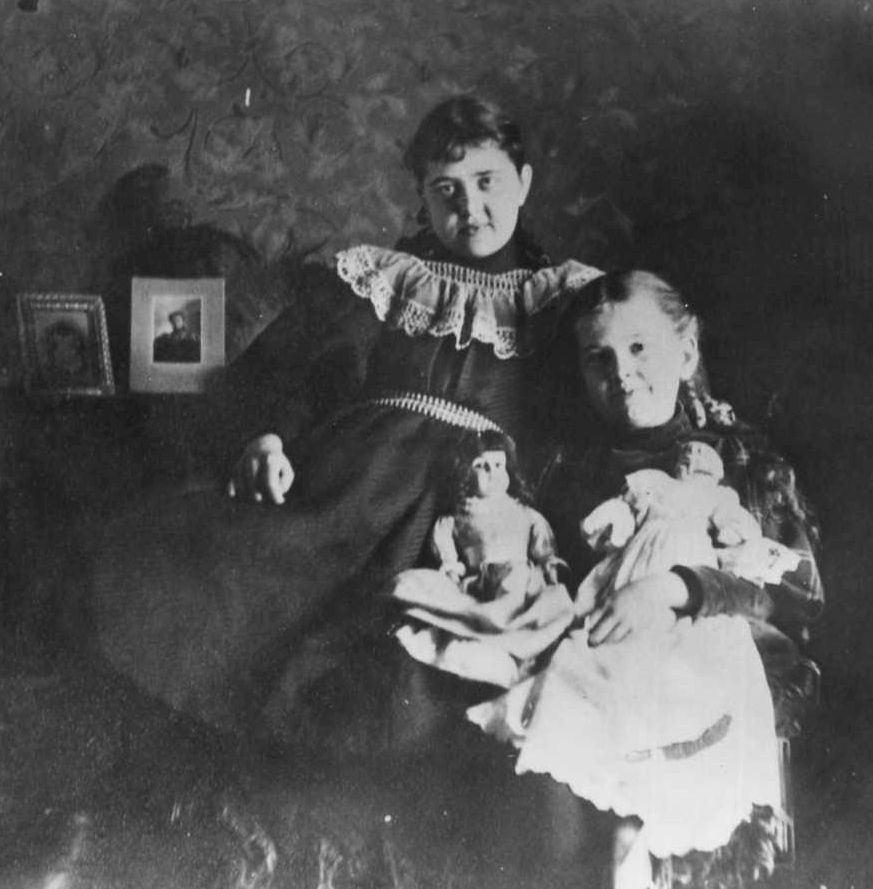
Mabel Leigh Hunt (left) and her sister Agnes Hunt in Dr. Tilghman Hunt's parlor on West Main Street, Plainfield, Indiana.

Hunt was born in Coatesville, Indiana, on November 1, 1892, to Quakers Dr. Tilghman Hunt and Amanda (Harvey) Hunt. She was raised in a Quaker home in Greencastle, Indiana. When she was ten, her family moved to Plainfield, Indiana, where they lived until her physician father died. She and her mother then moved to Indianapolis where, except for brief periods, she lived for the remainder of her life.

After graduating from Shortridge High School, Hunt returned to Greencastle to study at DePauw University 1910 to 1912, as well as attending the Western Reserve University Library School in Cleveland from 1923 to 1924. For twelve years, from 1926 to 1938, she worked as a children's librarian and branch librarian at the Indianapolis Public Library. In 1934 she published her first book, Lucinda, A Little Girl of 1860 while still working as a librarian; it wasn't until the year of her fifth book (1938) that she left her position to write full-time.

Hunt was just over five feet tall, with brown eyes and brown hair, listing her favorite occupations as "reading, cooking, friends, and travel." Many of her stories were set in Indiana, and their Quaker settings were based on stories of her mother's childhood. Two of her books were Newbery Honor winners: Have You Seen Tom Thumb? in 1943 and Better Known as Johnny Appleseed in 1951.

Mabel Leigh Hunt died in Indianapolis, Indiana, on September 3, 1971.

== Works ==
- Lucinda, A Little Girl of 1860, 1934
- The Boy Who Had No Birthday, 1935
- Little Girl with Seven Names, 1936
- Susan, Beware!, 1937
- Benjie's Hat, 1938
- Little Grey Gown, 1939
- Michel's Island, 1940
- Billy Button's Butter'd Biscuit, 1941
- John of Pudding Lane, 1941
- Corn-Belt Billy, 1942
- Have You Seen Tom Thumb?, 1942
- Peter Piper's Pickled Peppers, 1942
- The Peddler's Clock, 1943
- Young Man of the House, 1944
- Sibby Botherbox, 1945
- The Double Birthday Present, 1947
- Such a Kind World, 1947
- Matilda's Buttons, 1948
- Better Known as Johnny Appleseed, 1950
- The 69th Grandchild, 1951
- Ladycake Farm, 1952
- Singing Among Strangers, 1954
- Miss Jellytot's Visit, 1955
- Stars for Cristy, 1956
- Cristy at Skippinghills, 1958
- Tomorrow Will Be Bright, 1958
- Cupola House, 1961
- Johnny-Up and Johnny-Down, 1962
- Beggar's Daughter, 1963

== Awards ==
- Newbery Honor, Have You Seen Tom Thumb?, 1943
- Newbery Honor, Better Known as Johnny Appleseed, 1951
