= Elizabeth George Speare =

American novelist (1908–1994)

- Born: November 21, 1908; Melrose, Massachusetts, US
- Died: November 15, 1994 (aged 85); Tucson, Arizona, US
- Occupation: Writer
- Spouse: Alden Speare
- Children: 2
- Writing career
- Genre: Children's historical fiction
- Notable works: The Witch of Blackbird Pond; The Bronze Bow
- Notable awards: Newbery Medal; 1959, 1962; Children's Literature Legacy Award; 1989

Elizabeth George Speare (November 21, 1908 – November 15, 1994) was an American writer of children's historical fiction, including two Newbery Medal winners, recognizing the year's "most distinguished contribution to American literature for children". In 1989 she received the Children's Literature Legacy Award for her contributions to American children's literature and one of the Educational Paperback Association's top 100 authors.

== Life ==
Speare was born in Melrose, Massachusetts to Harry Allan and Demetria (Simmons) George. Her childhood, as she later recalled, was "exceptionally happy" and Melrose was "an ideal place in which to have grown up, close to fields and woods where we hiked and picnicked, and near to Boston where we frequently had family treats of theaters and concerts."

She had an extended family with one brother and many aunts, uncles, and cousins, and two parents. Speare lived much of her life in New England, the setting for many of her books.

Speare began writing stories while still in high school. After completing her Bachelor of Arts degree at Smith College in 1930, she earned her Master's degree in English from Boston University and taught English at several private Massachusetts high schools from 1932 to 1936.

In 1936, she met her future husband, Alden Speare, and together they moved to Connecticut where they married and raised two children. Although Speare always intended to write, the challenges and responsibilities of being a mother and wife drained her of any free time. Speare began to focus seriously on literature when her children were in junior high school.

== Literary career ==
Speare's first published work was a magazine article about skiing with her children. She also wrote many other magazine articles based on her experiences as a mother, and even experimented with one-act plays. Eventually her work saw circulation in Better Homes and Gardens, Woman's Day, Parents, and American Heritage.

Speare's first book, Calico Captive, was published by Houghton Mifflin in 1957. It features a colonial New Hampshire family kidnapped by Native Americans in 1754. The next year she completed her second historical novel, The Witch of Blackbird Pond, which won numerous awards, including the Newbery Medal in 1959. Ideas and inspiration for both books came to Speare while she was researching the history of New England and Connecticut, respectively. She earned her second Newbery Medal in 1962 for her third book, The Bronze Bow. The Sign of the Beaver (1984) was a Newbery Honor winner, and won the Scott O'Dell Award for Historical Fiction and the Christopher Award.

Biographer Marilyn Fain Apseloff wrote, “…she is not merely a writer of escapist literature, bringing only the past to her readers; in exploring universal problems and offering timeless values, she offers them hope for the present and the future as well."

In 1989, the Association for Library Service to Children awarded Speare the Children's Literature Legacy Award, which recognizes a living author or illustrator whose books, published in the United States, have made "a substantial and lasting contribution to literature for children". At the time, it was awarded every three years.

== Death ==
Speare died of a ruptured aortic aneurysm on November 15, 1994, aged 85, in Tucson, Arizona.

== Works ==
- Calico Captive (1957)
- The Witch of Blackbird Pond (1958) – Newbery Medal
- The Bronze Bow (1961) – Newbery Medal
- Life in Colonial America (1963)
- The Prospering (1966)
- The Sign of the Beaver (1983) – Newbery Honor
