= First Church =

First Church, Old First Church, or First Church Parsonage may refer to:

in New Zealand

- First Church of Otago, Dunedin

in the United States (by state)

- First Church Parsonage (Windsor, Connecticut), listed on the National Register of Historic Places (NRHP) in Connecticut
- First Church in Boston, Boston Massachusetts
- First Church and Parish in Dedham, Massachusetts
- First Church (Exeter, New Hampshire), listed on the NRHP in New Hampshire
- Old First Church (Huntington, New York), listed on the NRHP in New York
- First Reformed Episcopal Church, New York City
- First Church in Oberlin, listed on the NRHP in Ohio
- Old First Church (Sandusky, Ohio), listed on the NRHP in Ohio

== See also ==
- First Church Congregational, Methuen, Massachusetts, United States
- First Church of Christ, Congregational (disambiguation)
- First Church of Christ, Scientist (disambiguation)
