= Old First Church =

Old First Church may refer to:

Alphabetical by state, then town or city

- First Church of Christ, Congregational (Springfield, Massachusetts), or Old First Church, listed on the U.S. National Register of Historic Places (NRHP)
- Old First Church (Middletown Township, New Jersey), among the oldest continuous church congregations in the U.S.
- Old First Church (Huntington, New York), NRHP-listed
- Old First Church (Sandusky, Ohio), or First Presbyterian Church, NRHP-listed
- First Congregational Church of Bennington, Vermont, or Old First Church, NRHP-listed
