= Webb-Deane-Stevens Museum =

Museum in Wethersfield, Connecticut

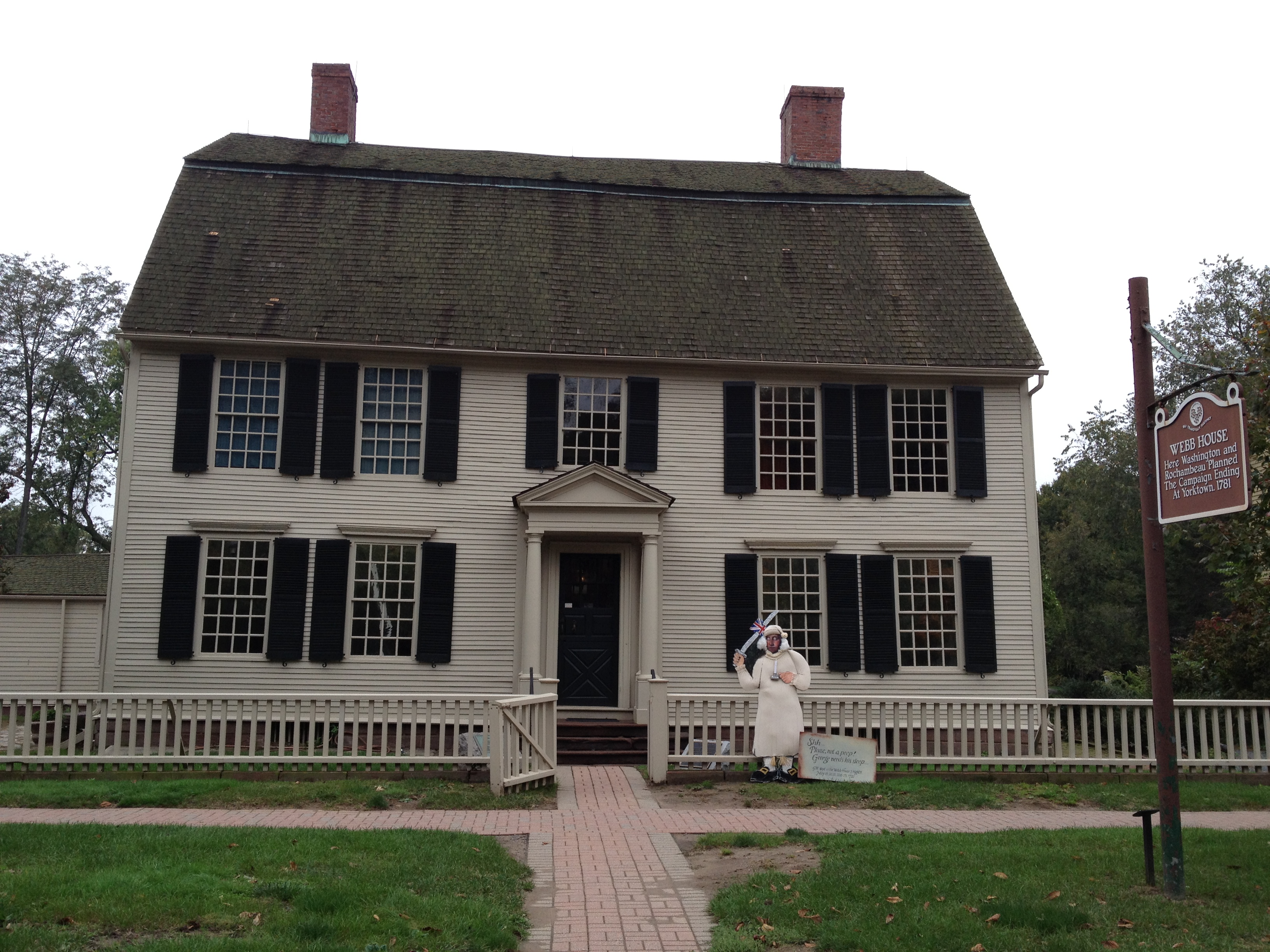
- Joseph Webb House, headquarters of the Webb-Deane-Stevens Museum

- Location within Connecticut Location within the United States
- Established: 1919
- Location: 211 Main Street; Wethersfield, Connecticut
- Coordinates: 41°42′41.6″N 72°39′13.4″W
- Website: Official site

The Webb-Deane-Stevens Museum, located in Wethersfield, Connecticut, is owned and operated by the National Society of the Colonial Dames of America in Connecticut. The museum features three 18th-century houses that sit on their original sites in the center of Old Wethersfield: the 1752 Joseph Webb House, the 1769 Silas Deane House and the 1789 Isaac Stevens House. The first two houses are listed as National Historic Landmarks and the last home is listed on the National Register of Historic Places in Connecticut. The houses are next door to each other.

The Joseph Webb House is the museum's main headquarters and has been restored to a late 18th-century appearance. There is a Colonial Revival garden out back and a 19th-century barn. The Silas Deane House has been restored to a mid-18th-century appearance. The Isaac Stevens House has been restored to reflect a middle-class family of the 1820s-1830s using many original family items.

The Webb-Deane-Stevens Museum also manages the nearby 1715 Buttolph–Williams House which is owned by Connecticut Landmarks. The interior features rare 17th- and early 18th-century antiques and was the setting for Elizabeth George Speare’s Newbery Medal-winning novel The Witch of Blackbird Pond (1958).

The Museum is accredited by the American Alliance of Museums.

== Properties ==
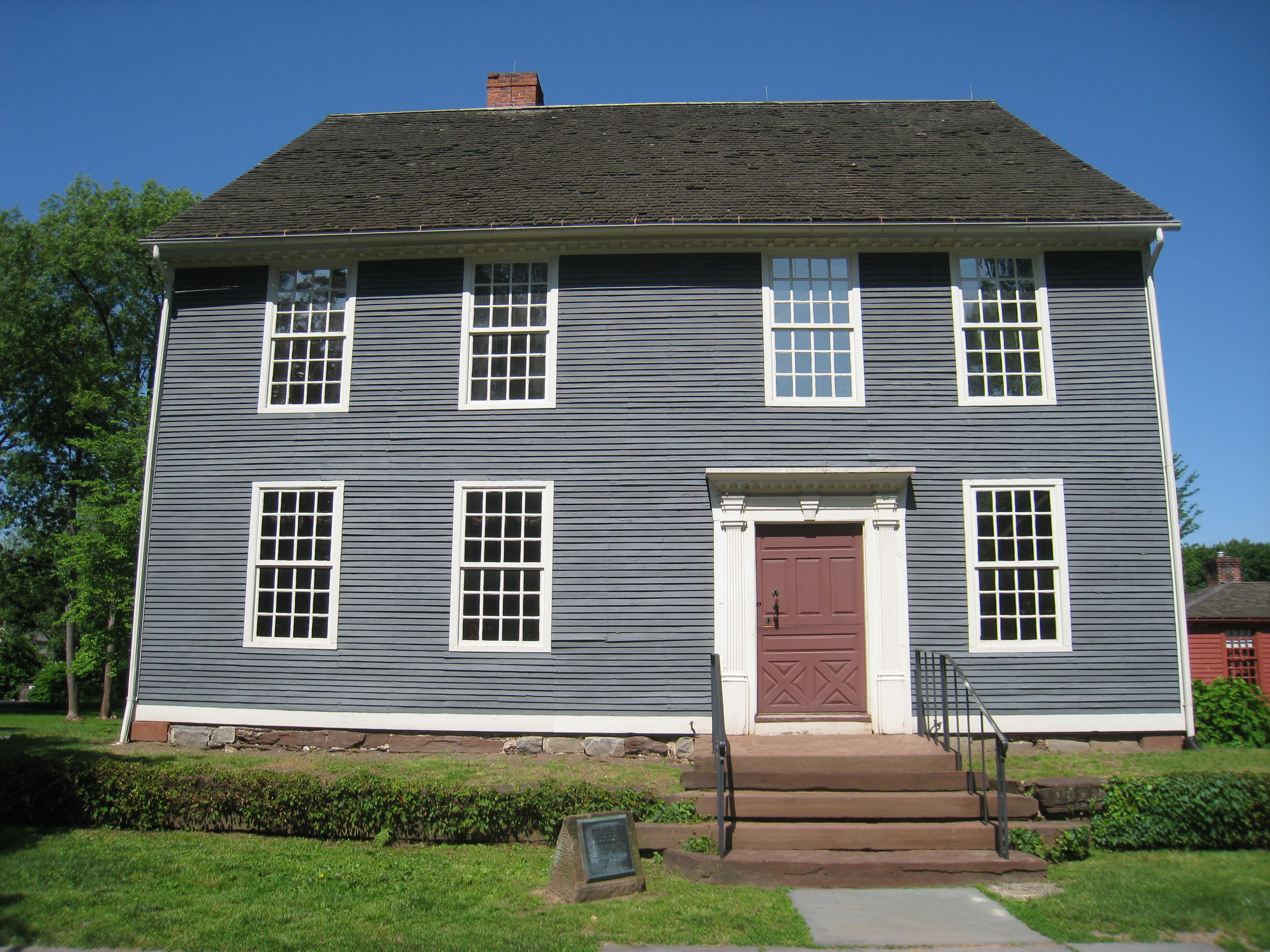
Silas Deane House

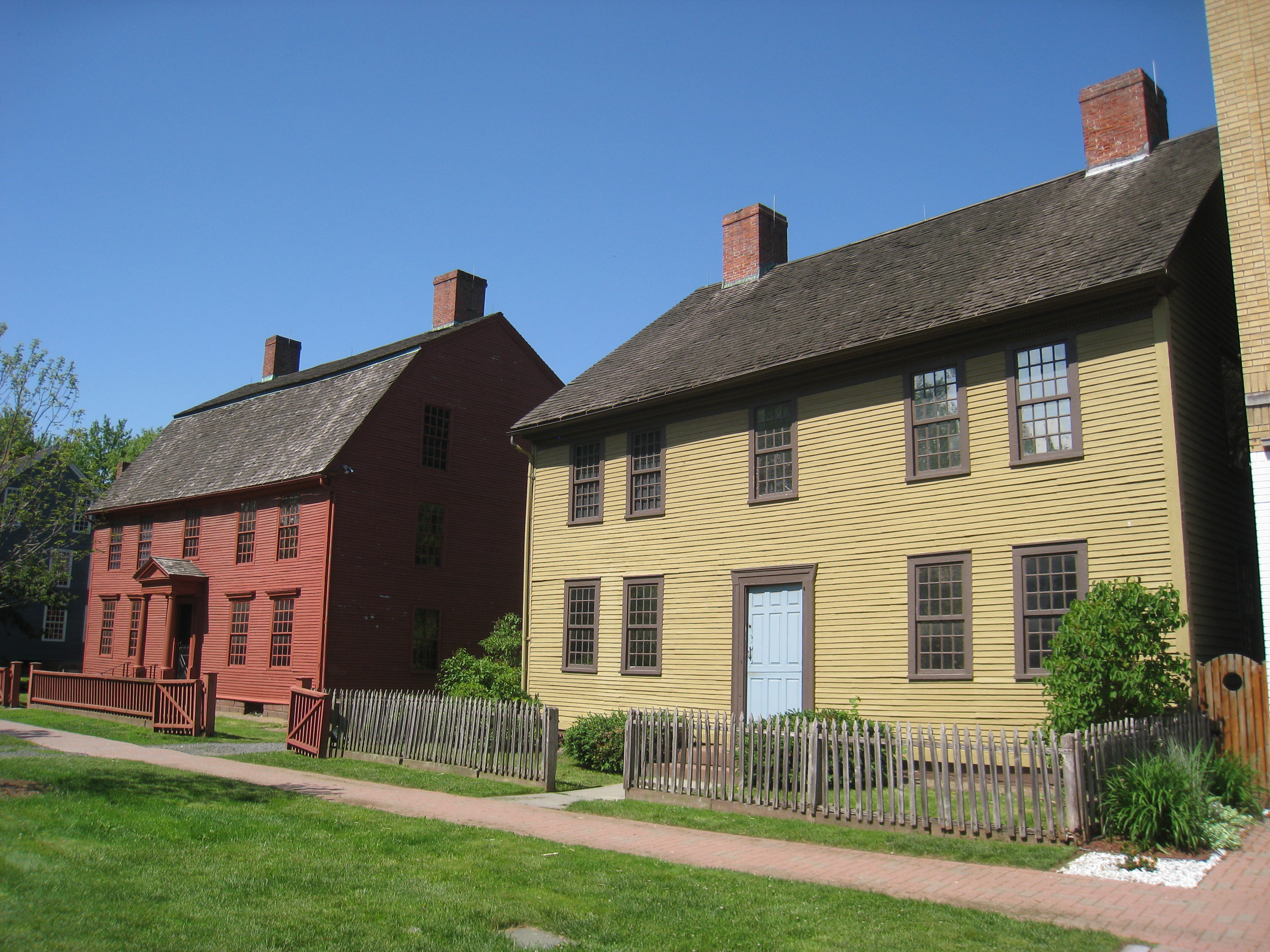
Joseph Webb and Isaac Stevens houses

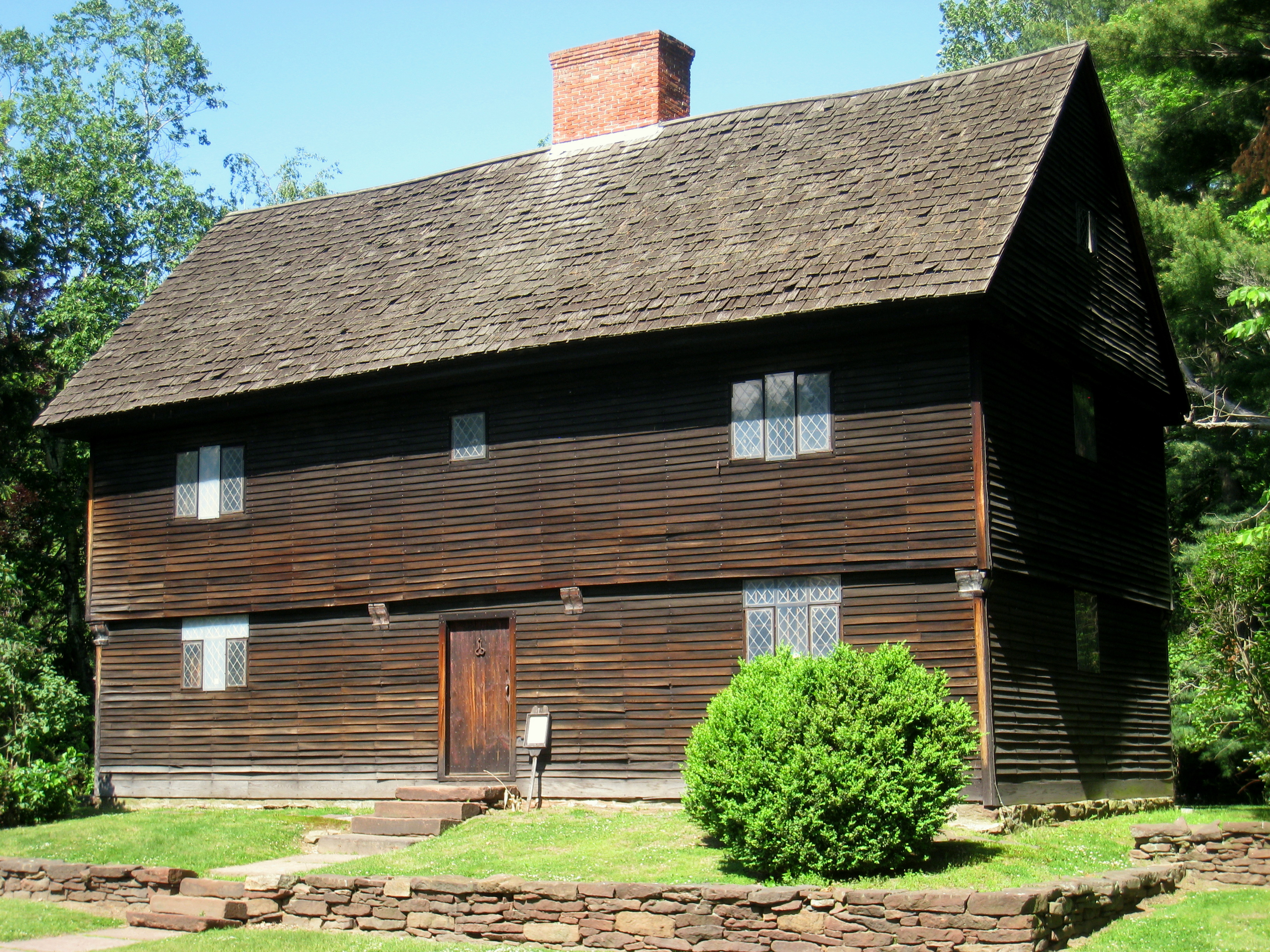
Buttolph-Williams House

== See also ==
- List of Washington's Headquarters during the Revolutionary War
