= Ryan Costello (baseball) =

American baseball player (1996–2019)

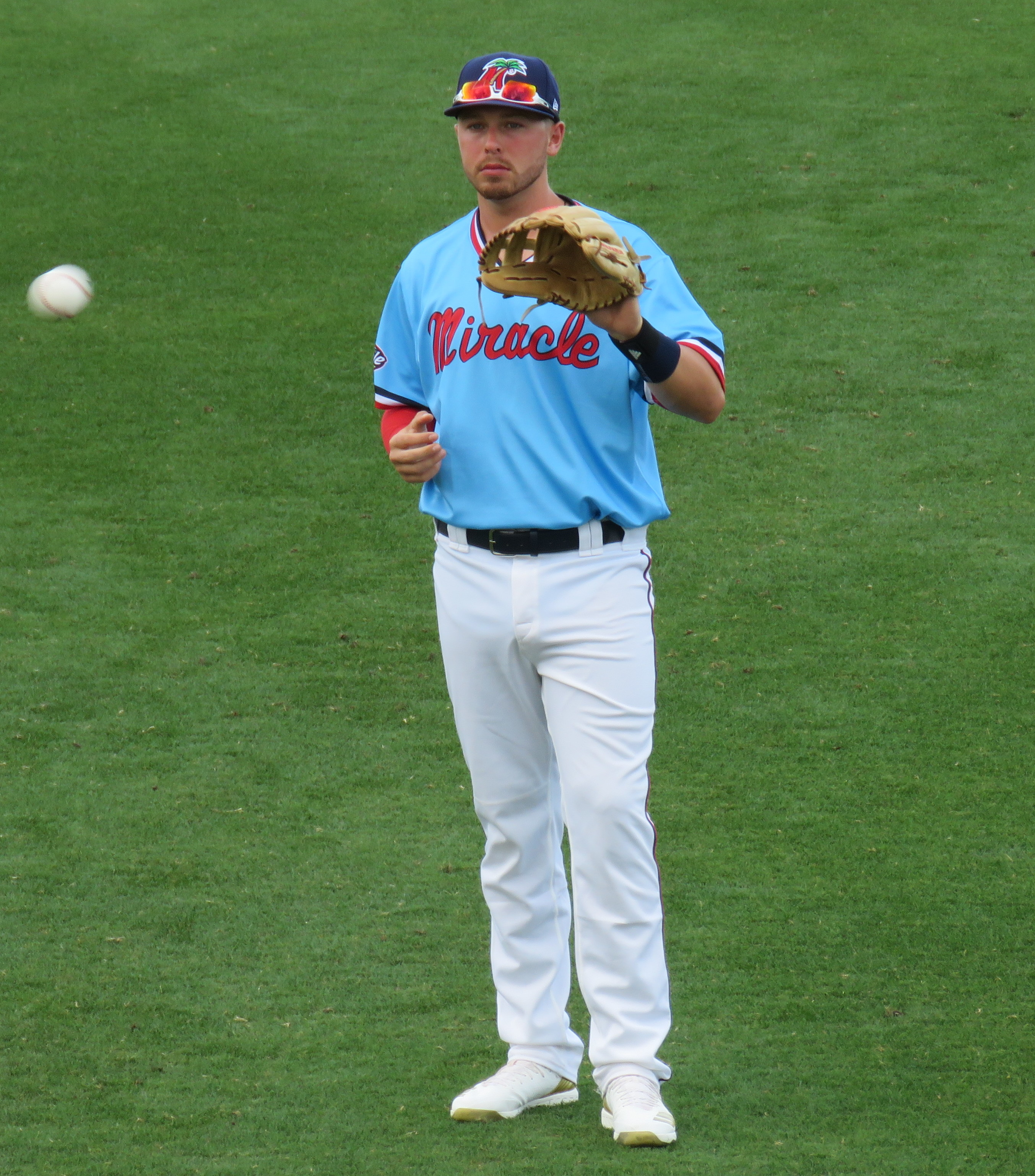
- Costello with the Fort Myers Miracle in 2019
- Infielder
- Born: June 13, 1996; Wethersfield, Connecticut, U.S.
- Died: November 18, 2019 (aged 23); Auckland, New Zealand
- Batted: Left Threw: Right

Ryan Christopher Costello (June 13, 1996 – November 18, 2019) was an American professional baseball infielder. He played college baseball for Central Connecticut State University then Minor League Baseball from 2017 to 2019. He died in New Zealand while preparing to play baseball in Australia.

== Career ==
=== Amateur ===
Costello attended Wethersfield High School in Wethersfield, Connecticut. Undrafted out of high school in the 2014 MLB draft, he enrolled at Central Connecticut State University, where he played college baseball. As a freshman in 2015, he appeared in 37 games (with 34 being starts), batting .248 with two home runs and 13 RBI. Following his first collegiate baseball season, he played for the Bristol Blues during the summer. In 2016, as a sophomore, he was batting .324 with three home runs and 21 RBI in 30 games before an injury ended his season. He returned from the injury that summer and played for the Keene Swamp Bats where he hit .264 with five home runs and 19 RBI in 42 games. As a junior in 2017, he batted .296 with nine home runs and 52 RBI in 58 games.

=== Seattle Mariners ===
After his junior year, Costello was selected by the Seattle Mariners in the 31st round of the 2017 MLB draft. He signed for $5,000 and made his professional debut that year for the rookie-level Arizona League Mariners, batting .331/.430/.634 with eight home runs and 38 RBI in 44 games. He began 2018 with the Single-A Clinton LumberKings, with whom he was named to the Midwest League All-Star Game where he participated in the Home Run Derby.

=== Minnesota Twins ===
On July 30, 2018, Costello (along with Chase De Jong) was traded to the Minnesota Twins in exchange for Zach Duke. He was assigned to their minor league affiliate, High-A Fort Myers Miracle, and finished the season there. In 128 games between Clinton and Fort Myers, he hit .258 with twenty home runs and 79 RBI. He returned to Fort Myers to begin 2019, and was later promoted to the Double-A Pensacola Blue Wahoos during the season. Over 108 games between the two affiliates, Costello batted .223/.343./412 with 15 home runs and 46 RBI.

== Death ==
Costello died on November 18, 2019, in Auckland, New Zealand, while preparing to start the Australian Baseball League season with the Auckland Tuatara. He was 23 years old. Costello was found dead in his hotel room bed by teammates. An autopsy revealed that he died of sudden cardiac arrhythmia. In February 2022, his parents filed a wrongful death lawsuit against the physician who conducted Costello's preseason physical, alleging that he intentionally ignored ECG results showing that Costello had Wolff–Parkinson–White syndrome which likely caused the sudden cardiac arrhythmia that led to his death.

== See also ==
- List of baseball players who died during their careers
