= First Church of Christ =

First Church of Christ, or variants thereof, may refer to:

- First Church of Christ, Congregational (disambiguation)
- First Church of Christ (New London, Connecticut)
- First Church of Christ, Scientist (disambiguation)
- The First Church of Christ, Scientist (Boston, Massachusetts)
- First Church of Christ, Unitarian in Lancaster, Massachusetts
- First Church of Christ, Wethersfield, Connecticut
