= First Church of Christ, Wethersfield =

Church in Connecticut, US, built 1761

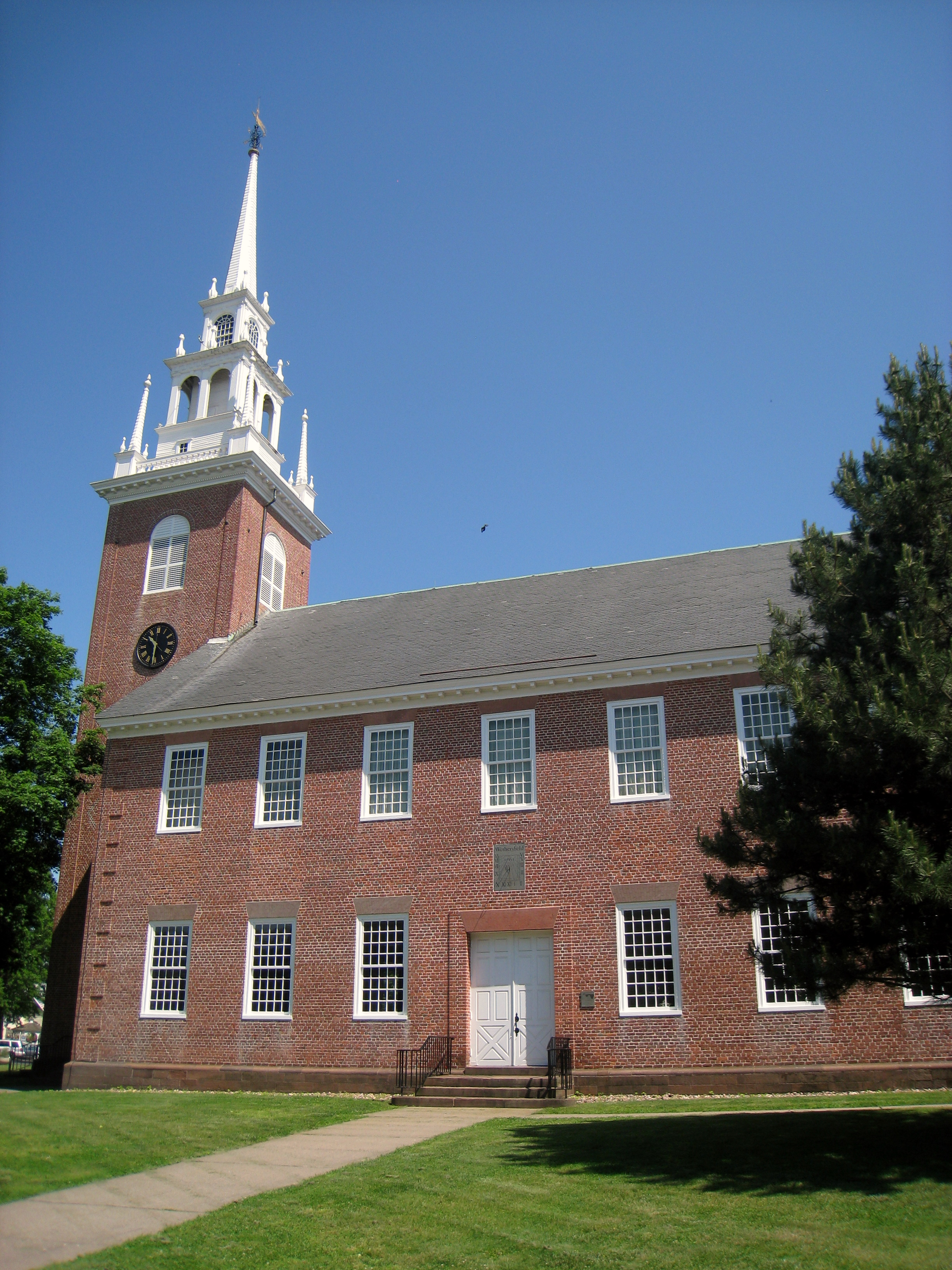
- 2009 photo

- Location within Connecticut

General information
- Architectural style: Georgian Colonial
- Location: 250 Main Street, Wethersfield, Connecticut, United States
- Coordinates: 41.7129°N 72.6520°W
- Completed: 1761

Website
- www.FirstChurch.org

The First Church of Christ, Wethersfield, is an American Colonial Era church located in the Old Wethersfield Historic District of Wethersfield, Connecticut. The congregation was founded in 1635, and the cemetery dates from the 1600s, but the current Georgian-style, brick meetinghouse, with its distinctive white steeple, was built in 1761. The interior of the current meetinghouse was built as a transverse church, altered considerably in 1838 and 1882, but returned to the original layout in 1971–1973.

== Background ==
According to a plaque at the tower entrance door, George Washington attended church here on May 20, 1781, during a conference with Count de Rochambeau at the nearby Joseph Webb House to plan the conclusion of the American Revolutionary War.

In 1774, John Adams visited Silas Deane, Wethersfield merchant and envoy to France, and subsequently wrote in his diary: “We went up the steeple of Wethersfield meeting-house, from whence is the most grand and beautiful prospect in the world, at least that I ever saw.”

The church, equipped with an Austin organ, hosted the first eighteen years of the Albert Schweitzer Organ Festival. This competition for young organists has been held annually since 1998 in the Hartford area, and was co-founded by First Church music minister David Spicer.

The congregation was affiliated with the United Church of Christ from 1961 through 2004 when the congregation overwhelmingly voted to break away citing theological and social differences, including gay marriage.

== Gallery ==
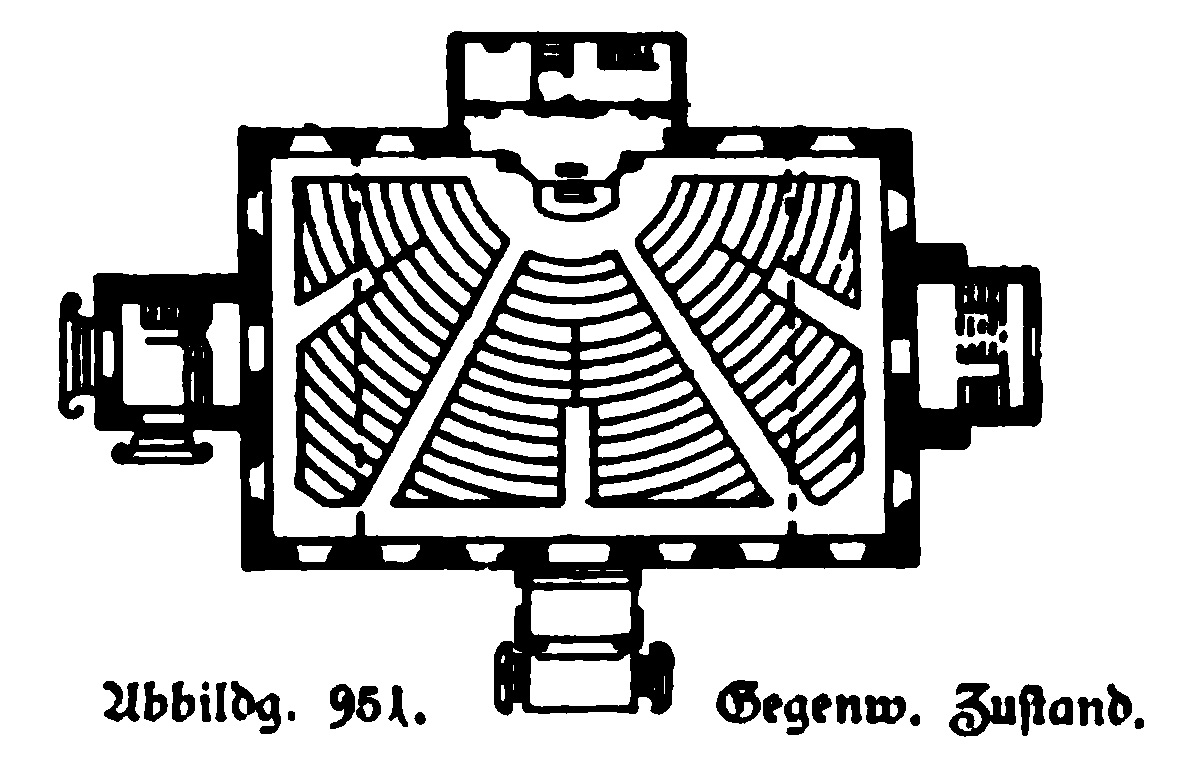
transverse church floorplan (1895)
