= Wethersfield Cove =

Bay in Connecticut, United States

Coordinates: 41°43′30″N 72°39′28″W

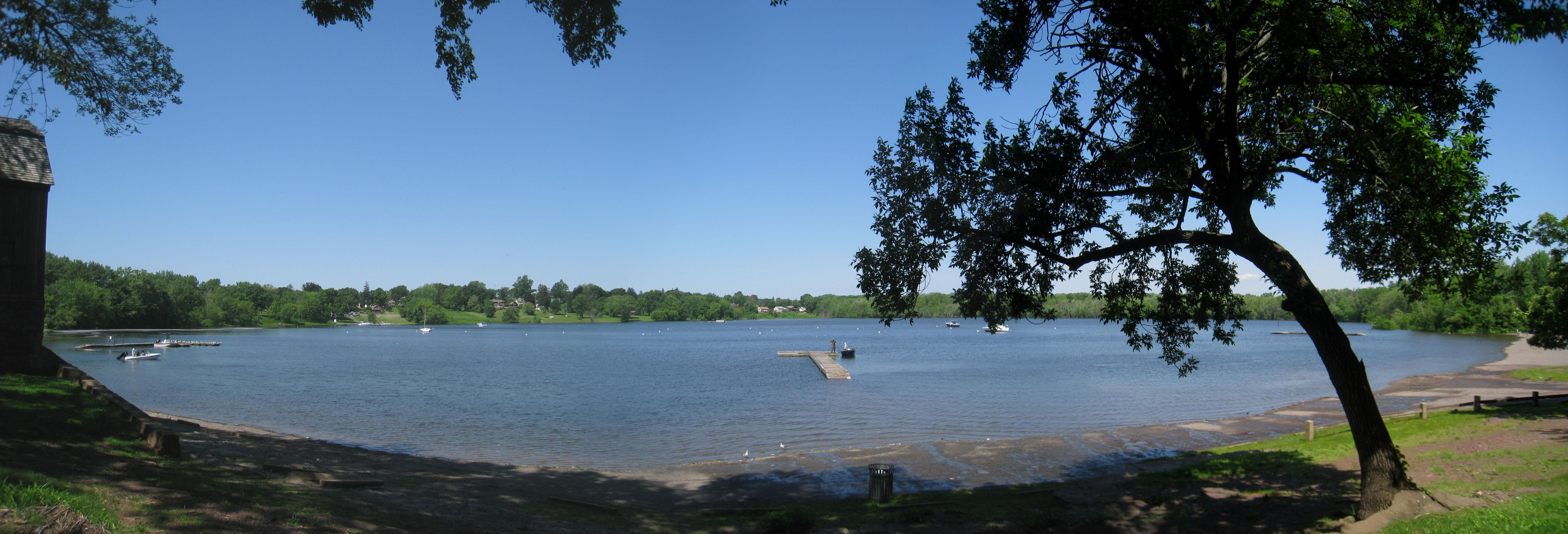
Wethersfield Cove

The Wethersfield Cove is a natural inlet in Wethersfield, Connecticut, and a former site of much local trade and travel.

== Geography ==
Wethersfield Cove is ten feet above sea level and forty miles from Long Island Sound. It was originally an oxbow in the Connecticut River. It is located near Old Wethersfield, one of the oldest settlements in the United States.

== History ==
Thomas Deming built his shipyard on the banks of this natural harbor. Deming launched the Tryall, the first ship built in Connecticut, from the cove in 1649. From 1650-1830, trade with the West Indies thrived. Merchants exported lumber, grain, onions, salted beef, fish and pork, and in exchange received salt, sugar, molasses and rum from the Caribbean. Around the time of the Revolutionary War, the Cove was known as Blackbird Pond.

== Pollution ==
Some citizens have protested the continued discharge of sewage into the cove, especially after the accidental discharge of 20 million gallons of sewage in 1997, and are lobbying for it to stop, but the proposed mitigation efforts would run into the hundreds of millions of dollars. The Metropolitan District Commission of Connecticut's multi-billion dollar Clean Water Project seeks to address this problem.

== Gallery ==
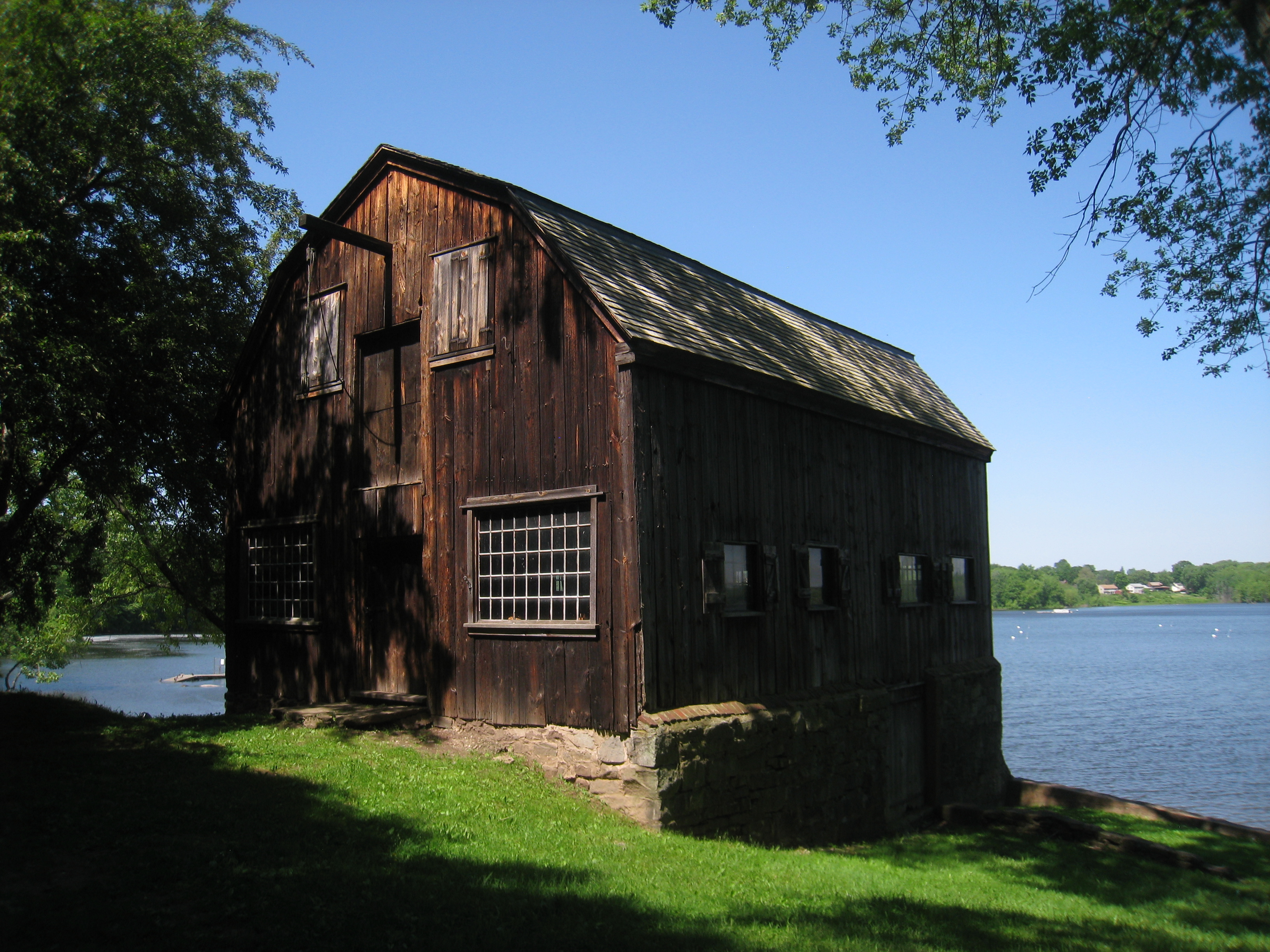
Restored 17th century warehouse and seasonal museum

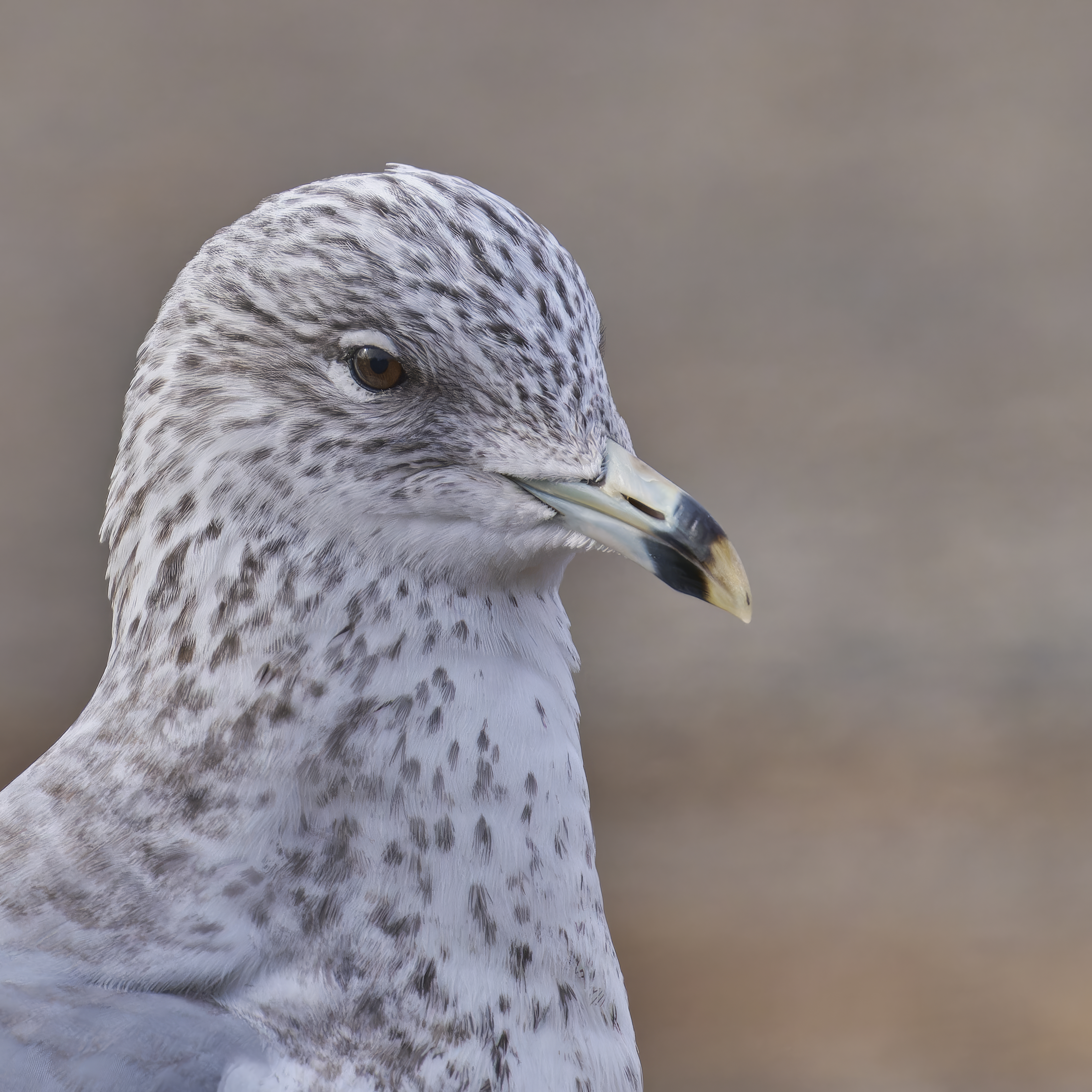
One of many Ring-billed Gulls that flock to the cove
