= Silas Deane House =

Historic house in Connecticut, United States

- U.S. National Register of Historic Places
- U.S. National Historic Landmark
- U.S. Historic district – Contributing property
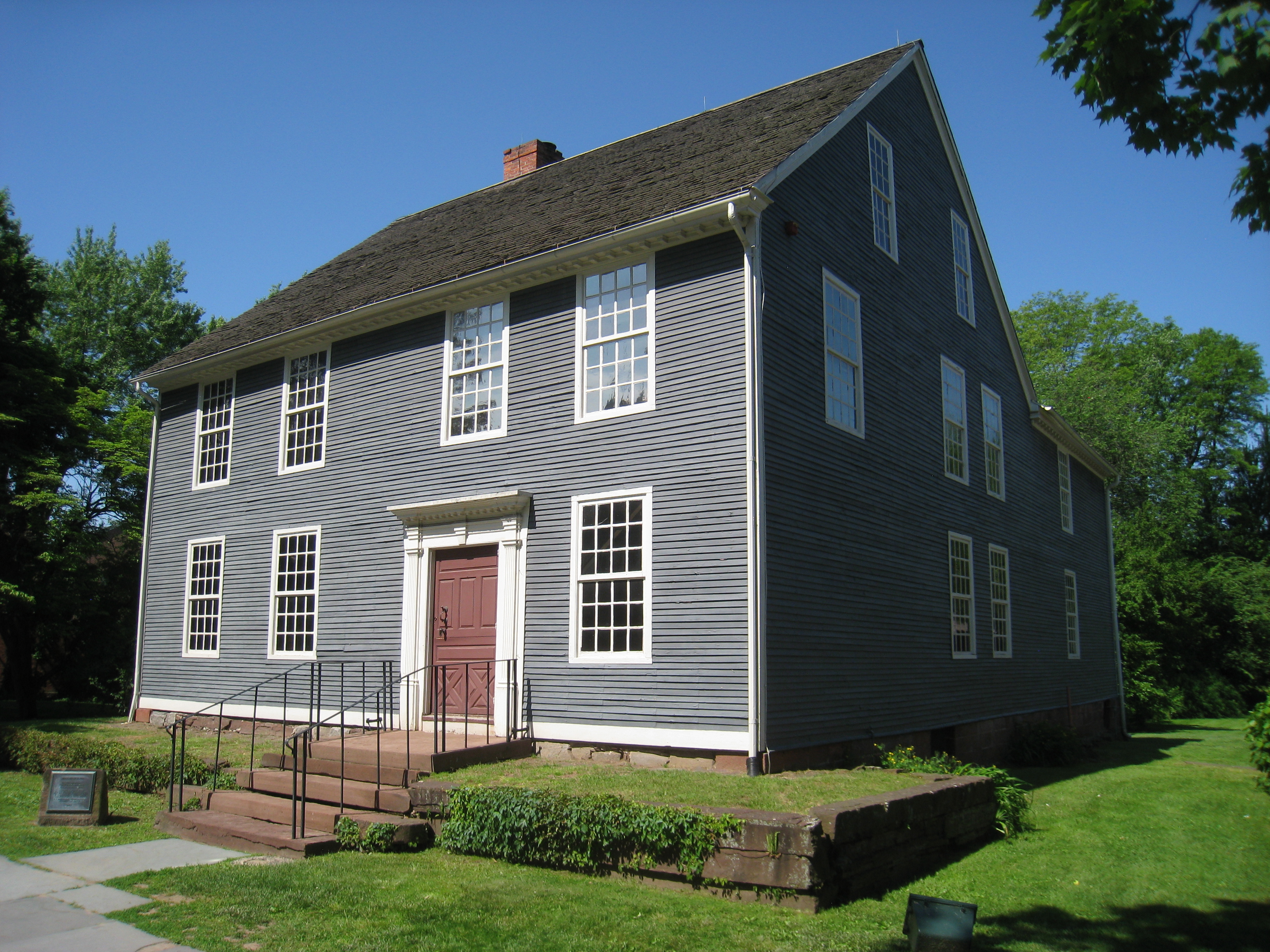
- Silas Deane House

- Location within Connecticut Location within the United States
- Location: 203 Main Street, Wethersfield, Connecticut
- Coordinates: 41°41′41.89″N 72°39′13.01″W
- Area: 1 acre (0.40 ha)
- Built: 1773
- Architectural style: Georgian
- Part of: Old Wethersfield Historic District (ID70000719)
- NRHP reference No.: 70000835

Significant dates
- Added to NRHP: October 6, 1970
- Designated NHL: November 28, 1972
- Designated CP: December 29, 1970

The Silas Deane House is a historic house museum at 203 Main Street in Wethersfield, Connecticut. Built in 1773, this National Historic Landmark was the home of Silas Deane (1737–1789), the first foreign diplomat for the United States.

== Description and history ==
The Deane house is a two-story wood-frame structure, four bays wide, with two asymmetrically placed interior chimneys, and a two-story ell extending to the rear. The main entry, in the second bay from the right, is flanked by pilasters and topped by a crowned and dentillated pediment. The interior features original woodwork, including pilasters and fully paneled fireplaces, and an elaborate stairway balustrade.

The house was built between 1769 and 1773 for Silas Deane. Trained as a lawyer, Deane became involved in resistance to attempts by the British Parliament to levy taxes on its colonies in the late 1760s, served in the First Continental Congress in 1774, and was elected to the Second Continental Congress in 1775. Deane was selected in March 1776 by that Congress to represent it in dealings with the Kingdom of France. Deane successfully negotiated the secret agreement by which France supported the nascent United States prior to its formal entry into the American Revolutionary War in 1778, after signing a formal treaty of alliance negotiated by a commission that included Deane. He later became disenchanted with the rebel cause, and died in exile in Europe.

In 1959, Deane's house was donated to The National Society of the Colonial Dames of America in Connecticut and in 1963–1965, it was restored. It is now open as part of the Webb-Deane-Stevens Museum and includes original furniture and portraits of Deane and his second wife. The Webb-Deane-Stevens Museum also owns the adjacent 18th-century Joseph Webb House and the Isaac Stevens House in Old Wethersfield, and also operates the nearby Buttolph–Williams House, which is owned by Connecticut Landmarks.

The house was listed on the National Register of Historic Places in 1970, and was declared a National Historic Landmark in 1972.

== See also ==
- List of National Historic Landmarks in Connecticut
- National Register of Historic Places listings in Hartford County, Connecticut
