= Diane Meredith Belcher =

American concert organist, teacher and church musician

Diane Meredith Belcher is an American concert organist, teacher, and church musician. She has given a large number of solo recitals throughout the United States and abroad, is a teacher, and has served as Director of Music at Bach Vespers/Holy Trinity Lutheran Church in New York City, Lecturer in Music Theory and Organ at Dartmouth College, in Hanover, New Hampshire, Music Director at Saint Thomas Episcopal Church, Hanover, Co-Organist/Choirmaster at Saint Mark's Episcopal Church in Philadelphia, and head of the Organ Division at Westminster Choir College in Princeton, New Jersey.

== Education ==
Belcher earned the degree of Bachelor of Music in 1982 from the Curtis Institute of Music, and the degree of Master of Music in 1983 from the Eastman School of Music. Her teachers include David Spicer, John Weaver, Clarence Watters, David Craighead, and Wilma Jensen (organ); Ford Lallerstedt (music theory, counterpoint and keyboard studies); Edward Aldwell and David Beach (music theory).

== Career ==
Belcher made her solo recital debut at age 15 at The Wayne Presbyterian Church in Wayne, Pennsylvania. While a student at Curtis, she was an Assistant Organist to Keith Chapman (organist) at the Wanamaker Organ in Philadelphia. At age 23, she was a featured recitalist at a convention of the American Guild of Organists for the first time, performing a full solo concert in Anaheim, California. The following year she made the first commercially available recording of the 1933 Ernest M. Skinner organ at Girard College, Philadelphia.

She subsequently won Second Prize in Interpretation at both the 1985 St Albans International Organ Festival and the 1988 Grand Prix de Chartres international organ competitions. In 1987 she was named an Associate of the American Guild of Organists, having won the S. Lewis Elmer Award for Highest Marks in the Professional Certification Examinations.

Belcher has given solo concerts throughout the United States and abroad. Her numerous recordings include the premiere CD of the Glatter-Götz/Rosales at Claremont, which won the 2000 Golden Ear Award from The Absolute Sound. She has appeared as a featured recitalist at four national conventions of the American Guild of Organists, as well as numerous chapter meeting and regional conventions. Performances with orchestra include the Philadelphia, Jacksonville, Syracuse, and Memphis Symphony Orchestras, as well as the Philadelphia Chamber Orchestra and Cambridge Concentus, and she has collaborated with such colleagues as trombonist Joseph Alessi, trumpeter Rob Roy McGregor, the Memphis Boychoir, the Choral Arts Society of Philadelphia, and the Buxtehude Consort. She was the founding director of The Memphis Concert Chorale.

Recital credits include Disney Hall, Verizon Hall, Benaroya Hall, Grace Cathedral, the opening concert of The Wanamaker Organ's 100th anniversary in Philadelphia, the Memorial Church of Harvard University, Saint Thomas Church in Manhattan, the Oregon Bach Festival, Woolsey Hall on the campus of Yale University, the Cleveland Museum of Art, West Point Cadet Chapel, Spivey Hall, Girard College, the Wildwood Festival in Little Rock, the Fourth Presbyterian Church in Chicago, Cathedral of the Madeleine in Salt Lake City, the Auditorium in Missouri; Ned Rorem's 80th birthday celebration, the Merrill Auditorium, and the Crystal Cathedral.

Other previous positions include organist and director of music at Park Central Presbyterian Church in Syracuse, Christ Church Episcopal in Memphis, St. Mark's Episcopal Church in Philadelphia, Old St. Paul's Episcopal Church in Baltimore, and St. Mary Star of the Sea in Beverly, Massachusetts, and faculty at the University of Memphis and the University of Pennsylvania. She has given numerous master classes, and is a frequent judge at organ competitions, including the Hartford-area Albert Schweitzer Organ Festival, where she was named a permanent judge in 2013. Belcher has composed a small body of organ and sacred music, including “Lutebook Lullabye”, which was written for Karen McFarlane.

== Personal life ==
Belcher was married for twenty years to the American organist and choral director John Ayer. They have three sons.

== Discography ==
- The Missouri Jewel (2-CD set): Notable hymns and associated repertoire [JAV 183]
- Great Organs of America: The Glatter-Götz/Rosales at Claremont [JAV 115]
- Jongen: Symphonie Concertante for Organ and Orchestra, op. 81 [DTR 8804]
- The Great Skinner Organ at Girard College [DTR 8403]
- PIPEDREAMS Premieres, Vol. 2: Music of Libby Larsen (Aspects of Glory)
- The Memphis Boychoir: Our Dancing Day (composer of "Lutebook Lullabye") [Pro Organo]
- The Memphis Boychoir: In Every Corner Sing [Pro Organo]
- The Memphis Boychoir: Shout the Glad Tidings [Pro Organo]
- The Memphis Boychoir: What Sweeter Music [Pro Organo]

== Reviews ==
- CLEVELAND: “A formidable virtuoso, Belcher played ... with authority and zest.” The Plain Dealer
- HALIFAX: “Belcher began with a Prelude and Fugue in A Minor by Brahms, boldly taking charge of the musical energy from the first chord, and playing with such command of imagery and design that Horowitz at the piano came to mind … an amazing display of musical virtuosity of the highest order.” The Chronicle Herald
- LITTLE ROCK: “The Wildwood Festival imports many artists each season, but I doubt that any performer brought in for the festival has the artistic integrity and power that Belcher has. This is a performer who knows how to deliver the goods.” Arkansas Times
- CLAREMONT, CALIFORNIA: “Gigantic! A CD that is addictive! … Diane Meredith Belcher’s playing … is exemplary in every respect. She … masterfully expresses the essence of each composition as it unfolds.” Orgel International
- PHILADELPHIA: “... whose playing is glowingly brilliant, rhythmically vibrant, consistently expressive, and full of both atmosphere and personality – in short, everything that artistic organ playing should be.” American Record Guide—from Karen McFarlane Artists website
