= Silas Deane =

American Founding Father, merchant, politician, and diplomat (1737/8–1789)

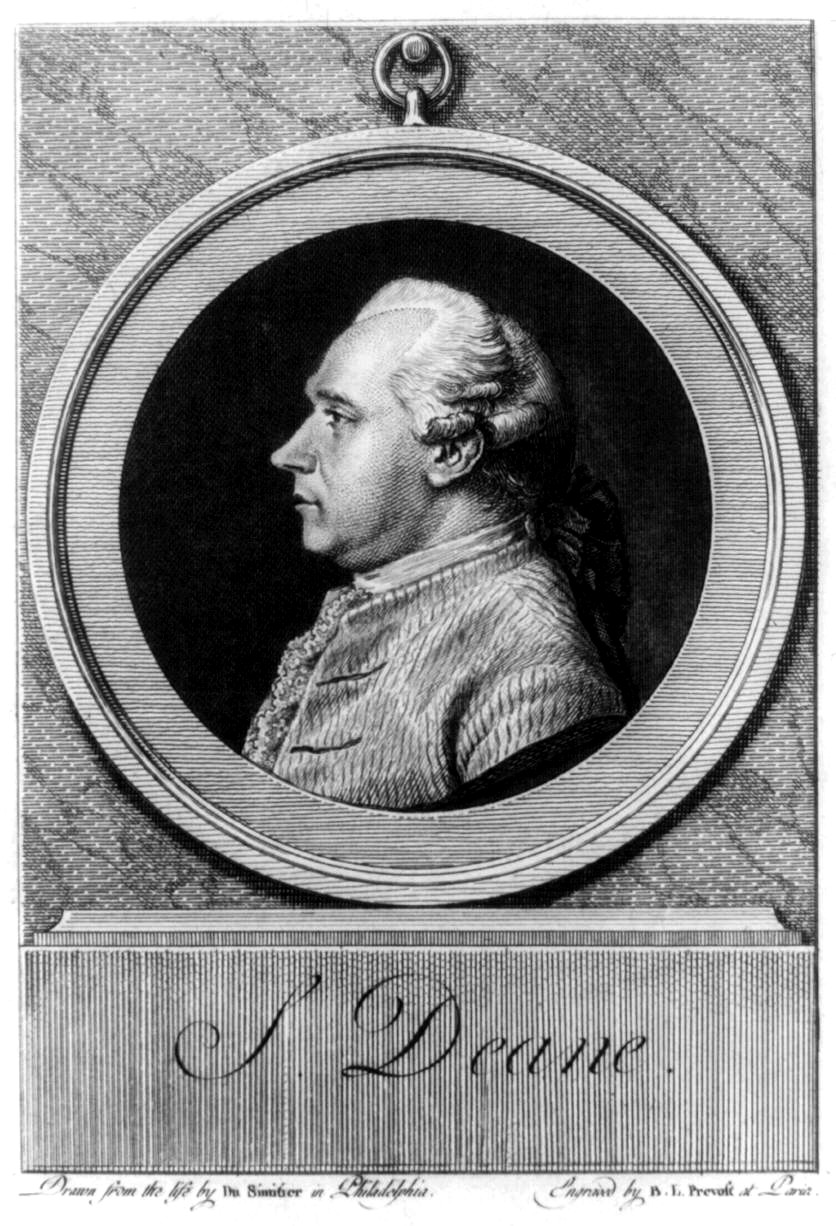
- Silas Deane, 1781

United States Envoy to France
- In office March 2, 1776 – January 4, 1778 Serving with Benjamin Franklin, Arthur Lee
- Appointed by: Continental Congress
- Preceded by: Position established
- Succeeded by: John Adams

Delegate to the Second Continental Congress from Connecticut
- In office May 10, 1775 – January 15, 1776

Delegate to the First Continental Congress from Connecticut
- In office September 5, 1774 – October 26, 1774

Personal details
- Born: January 4, 1738 Groton, Connecticut
- Died: September 23, 1789 (aged 51) on a ship near Kent, Great Britain
- Resting place: St. Leonard's Churchyard, Deal, Kent, United Kingdom
- Spouses: Mehitable Nott Webb (m. 1763; died 1767) Elizabeth Saltonstall Ewets (m. 1770; died 1777)
- Children: Jesse Deane
- Education: Yale

Silas Deane (January 4, 1738 [O.S. December 24, 1737] – September 23, 1789) was an American Founding Father, merchant, politician, and diplomat, and a supporter of American independence. Deane served as a delegate to the Continental Congress, where he signed the Continental Association, and then became the first foreign diplomat from the United States to France, where he helped negotiate the 1778 Treaty of Alliance that allied France with the United States during the American Revolutionary War.

Near the end of the war, Congress charged Deane with financial impropriety, and the British intercepted and published some letters in which he had implied that the American cause was hopeless. After the war, Deane lived in Ghent and London and died under mysterious circumstances while attempting to return to America.

== Biography ==
=== Early life and family ===
Deane was born on January 4, 1738 [O.S. December 24, 1737] in Groton, Connecticut, to blacksmith Silas Deane and his wife Hannah Barker. The younger Silas was able to obtain a full scholarship to Yale and graduated in 1758. In April 1759, he was hired to tutor a young Edward Bancroft in Hartford, Connecticut. In 1761, Deane was admitted to the bar and practiced law for a short time outside of Hartford before moving to Wethersfield, Connecticut, and establishing a thriving business as a merchant.

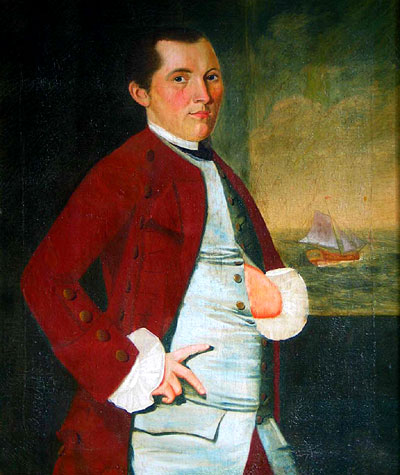
Deane in a 1766 painting by William Johnston

Deane married twice, both times to wealthy widows from Wethersfield. In 1763, he married Mehitable (Nott) Webb after assisting her with the settlement of her first husband's estate. They had one son, Jesse, born in 1764. Mehitable died in 1767. In 1770, Deane married Elizabeth (Saltonstall) Ewets, granddaughter of Connecticut Governor Gurdon Saltonstall of the Massachusetts Saltonstall family. Elizabeth died in 1777 while Silas was in France. Both Mehitable and Elizabeth were buried in the Old Wethersfield Village Cemetery.

=== Continental Congress ===
In 1768, Deane was elected to the Connecticut House of Representatives; in 1769, he was appointed to the Wethersfield Committee of Correspondence; and from 1774 to 1776, he served as a delegate from Connecticut to the Continental Congress.

While a member of Congress, Deane used his influence to obtain a commission in the Continental Army for his stepson Samuel B. Webb, who had accompanied him to Philadelphia. Deane excelled in the committee work of Congress, helping to coordinate the attack on Fort Ticonderoga and to establish the United States Navy.

A dispute arose between Deane and fellow Connecticut delegate Roger Sherman over the appointment of Israel Putnam as a major general under George Washington's command. This dispute led the Connecticut legislature to replace Deane as a delegate to Congress; but instead of returning to Connecticut, Deane remained in Philadelphia to assist Congress.

=== Delegate to France ===
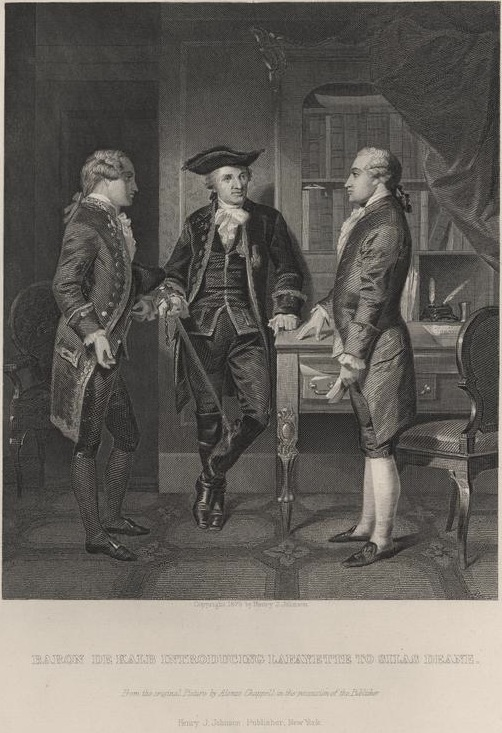
Baron de Kalb Introducing Lafayette to Silas Deane (1879 Print)

On March 2, 1776, Congress appointed Deane as a secret envoy to France with the mission of inducing the French government to grant financial aid to the colonies. He began negotiating with French Foreign Minister Comte de Vergennes as soon as he arrived in Paris. Deane organized the shipment of arms and munitions to the colonies with the assistance of Pierre Beaumarchais, the playwright and outspoken supporter of American independence. Deane also tacitly approved the plot of Scotsman James Aitken (John the Painter) to destroy Royal Navy stores and dockyards in Portsmouth and Plymouth, England, on behalf of the Continental cause.

Deane's position was officially recognized after Benjamin Franklin and Arthur Lee arrived in Paris in December 1776, with orders from Congress appointing the trio as the diplomatic delegation to France. Deane recruited the services of several foreign soldiers to the cause, including Marquis de Lafayette, Baron Johann de Kalb, Thomas Conway, Casimir Pulaski, and Baron von Steuben. For a variety of reasons, many of the foreign officers were unpopular in America, and many in Congress blamed Deane for their behavior, leading them to recall him on December 8, 1777.

On February 6, 1778, Deane and the other commissioners signed the Treaties of Amity and Commerce and of Alliance, officially creating the alliance between France and the American colonies.

=== Accusations in Congress ===
On March 4, 1778, Deane received a letter from James Lovell containing the recall order from Congress. Lovell only mentioned giving a report to Congress about European affairs, and Deane fully expected to be sent back to Paris within a few months. France sent Deane back home aboard a warship. Louis XVI also presented Deane with a portrait framed with diamonds, and both Vergennes and Franklin wrote letters of commendation.

Deane arrived in Philadelphia on July 14, 1778, and was shocked when Congress accused him of financial impropriety on the basis of reports by his fellow commissioner Arthur Lee. Because Deane had left his account books in Paris, he was neither able to properly defend himself nor seek reimbursement for money he had spent procuring supplies in France. (While he waited to address Congress, Deane stayed with Benedict Arnold, who had just been appointed military governor of Philadelphia.)

In a long and bitter dispute over the charges, Deane was defended before Congress by John Jay. He published a public defense in the December 5, 1778, issue of Pennsylvania Packet entitled The Address of Silas Deane to the Free and Virtuous Citizens of America, in which he attacked Arthur Lee, other members of the Lee family, and their associates. Arthur's brothers Richard Henry Lee and Francis Lightfoot Lee both denounced Deane's accusations as libelous and injurious to the American cause. (Note: During this same time period, a ship built in France for the Continental Navy was christened the Deane in his honor.) On January 14, 1779, Deane replied in the Pennsylvania Packet, listing eight ships that had sailed from France with supplies because of his efforts. Congress offered him $10,000 in depreciated Continental currency in compensation, but Deane refused, believing the amount too small. Deane was allowed to return to Paris in 1780 to settle his affairs and attempt to assemble the records in dispute. On arrival, he discovered that he was nearly ruined financially because the value of his investments had plummeted, and some ships carrying his merchandise had been captured by the British.

In March 1781, King George III approved a request from Lord North to bribe Deane in an attempt to recruit him as a spy and to influence Congress. However, in mid-July they cancelled their plan after the king read intercepted letters in which Deane described the military situation of the Colonies as hopeless and suggested a rapprochement with Britain. Deane's correspondence was then forwarded to General Henry Clinton, who provided copies to Loyalist James Rivington to publish in his newspaper Rivington's Royal Gazette in New York City. Deane was then accused of treason by his fellow colonists. Rivington may have been a spy as a member of the Culper Ring, and unbeknownst to Deane, his former secretary in Paris, Edward Bancroft, had been a British spy.

=== After the war and death ===
In October 1781, Deane moved to Ghent where he could live more cheaply than in Paris. Then in March 1783, he moved to London, hoping to find investors for manufacturing ventures that he planned to pursue after he returned to North America. He toured several manufacturing towns in England in late 1783, considering plans for steam engines that could operate grist mills, even consulting James Watt for advice. He also tried to attract investors for a planned canal linking Lake Champlain and the St. Lawrence River. In 1784, he published a defense of his actions during the war entitled An Address to the Free and Independent Citizens of the United States of North America.

In the fall of 1787, Deane became bedridden from an unknown illness and did not fully recover until April 1789. His condition depleted his remaining money and forced him to depend on the charity of friends. In the summer of 1788, a Frenchman named Foulloy approached Thomas Jefferson in Paris with an account book and a letter book dating from Deane's diplomatic mission, apparently stolen from Deane during his illness. Foulloy threatened to sell the books to the British government if Jefferson did not purchase them—which Jefferson eventually did after negotiating a greatly reduced price.

In 1789, Deane planned to return to North America in an attempt to recoup his lost fortune and reputation. After boarding the ship Boston Packet, he became of ill and died on September 23 while the ship was awaiting repairs after turning back following damage from fierce winds. The nature of his death is mysterious, although the most accepted conclusion is that Deane intentionally overdosed of laudanum or by natural causes. In 1959, historian Julian P. Boyd suggested that Deane might have been poisoned by Bancroft, because Bancroft might have felt threatened by Deane's possible testimony to Congress.

== Legacy ==
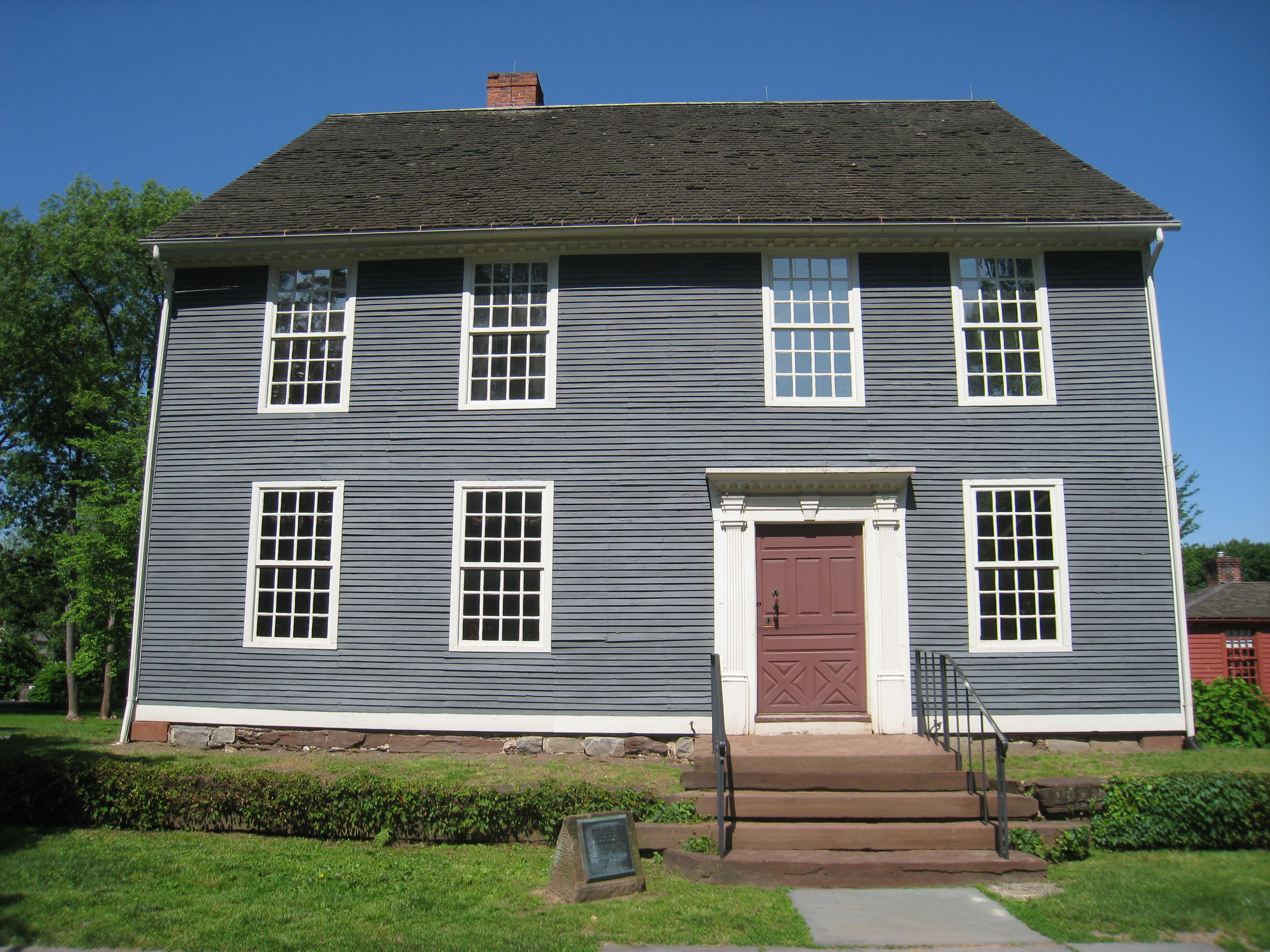
Silas Deane House in Wethersfield, Connecticut

Silas Deane's granddaughter Philura (Deane) Alden pressed his case before Congress, and his family was eventually paid $37,000 in 1841 (more than a million dollars in the early 21st century) for the money owed to him, on the grounds that the previous audit by the Continental Congress was "ex parte, erroneous, and a gross injustice to Silas Deane".

Deane's hometown of Wethersfield, Connecticut, has a Silas Deane Middle School and a Silas Deane Highway. A road in Ledyard, Connecticut, is named for him. Deane's home in Wethersfield, now the Silas Deane House, has been restored, declared a National Historic Landmark, and opened to the public as a part of the Webb-Deane-Stevens Museum. Dean Street in Brooklyn is named for him.
