= William Watson Andrews =

American clergyman (1810–1897)

William Watson Andrews (1810–1897) was an American clergyman of the Catholic Apostolic Church. He was born at Windham, Windham Co., Conn., graduated in 1831 at Yale, and in 1834 was ordained and installed pastor of the Congregational church at Kent, Conn. He early accepted the tenet of the Catholic Apostolic Church, commonly spoken of as the "Irvingites," and in 1849, having given up his charge at Kent. he assumed charge of the Catholic Apostolic congregation in Potsdam, N.Y, He subsequently made his home in Wethersfield, Conn., and traveled much in the Eastern and Middle States as an evangelist. Among the congregations established under his direction was one organized at Hartford in 1868. He was an eloquent preacher and a clear and forceful writer. He contributed articles on the Catholic Apostolic church to the Bibliotheca Sacra and McClintock and Strong's Cyclopœdia, prepared for the Life of Porter a chapter on Dr. Porter as "A Student at Yale," and published many reviews, orations, sermons, and addresses, and The Miscellanies and Correspondence of Hon. John Cotton Smith (1847). His son was the notable historian, Charles Mclean Andrews.

== Literature ==
- Andrews, William Watson Andrews; A Memorial (New York, 1900)
