= David Spicer (organist) =

David Charles Spicer (December 26, 1946 – January 18, 2017) was an American organist and church musician. He was Minister of Music and the Arts at the First Church of Christ in Wethersfield, Connecticut, where he co-founded the Albert Schweitzer Organ Festival and directed it from 1997 to 2015.

== Life and career ==
A native of Austin, Texas, Spicer was a 1968 graduate of the Curtis Institute of Music in Philadelphia, where he was an artist/scholar under Alexander McCurdy and a devotee of Virgil Fox. Spicer received his first musical training from his parents, performing on the organ in church at the age of eight. While at Curtis, Spicer was a classmate and friend of Keith Chapman, organist for the John Wanamaker organ in Philadelphia, Pennsylvania. Spicer completed graduate studies at Eastern Baptist Theological Seminary in Wynnewood, Pennsylvania.

From 1967 to about 1982, Spicer was organist-choirmaster at the Wayne Presbyterian Church in Wayne, Pennsylvania. While at Wayne, Spicer helped to further the studies of future professional musicians including Diane Meredith Belcher (organist), David Wetherill (principal horn, Philadelphia Orchestra), Anne Martindale Williams (principal cello, Pittsburgh Symphony), Sally Nelson Kuhns (associate principal trumpet, Oregon Symphony), Bob Hower (trombone, University of Adelaide, Australia), and Jay Krush (tuba and composer, Philadelphia, Pennsylvania). At the same time, two members of the Philadelphia Orchestra, Donald McComas (associate principal trumpet) and his wife, Sharlene McComas (flute), were members of Wayne Presbyterian Church and often performed with Spicer as soloists and orchestral performers at Wayne. A gifted conductor, Spicer presented many oratorio concerts with orchestra throughout his career, including several premiere performances of Verdi's Requiem, Berlioz's Requiem, Sir William Walton's Belshazzar's Feast, Felix Mendelssohn's Elijah oratorio, and Gian Carlo Menotti's Amahl and the Night Visitors.

From about 1982 to 1986, Spicer was the Director of Music at the First Presbyterian Church in Lincoln, Nebraska, before he assumed the Wethersfield position in 1986. Also a teacher, Spicer mentored numerous younger organists and held the distinction of having three of his students (including Diane Meredith Belcher) win full scholarships to his alma mater, the Curtis Institute of Music. Spicer trained and inspired hundreds of children and youth to perform in his church choirs. He prompted and demonstrated excellence at all times, while extracting the highest levels of performance from those he was teaching and conducting. Spicer regularly referenced the importance of diction and pronunciation while singing. Spicer emphasized the importance of phrasing and pauses in singing while maintaining long, open tones (where appropriate) in order to project sound effectively. He also referred to the hymn known as the "Old 100th" as being the "Old Tooth" (by merely placing a cross-bar across the number "1"). Spicer served on the faculty of Tunxis Community College in Farmington, Connecticut. In 1997, Spicer co-founded, with Harold Robles, the annual Albert Schweitzer Organ Festival USA. The festival competition attracts outstanding young organists, both high-school students and young professionals, from across the country.

Spicer died of cancer in Malvern, Pennsylvania, on January 18, 2017. He was survived by his wife, Dana, and their blended family of seven children, sixteen grandchildren and two great-grandchildren. His wife, Dana, is a native of Wayne, Pennsylvania.

== Discography ==
- Vintage Spicer
- Kaleidoscope
