= Wethersfield High School (Connecticut) =

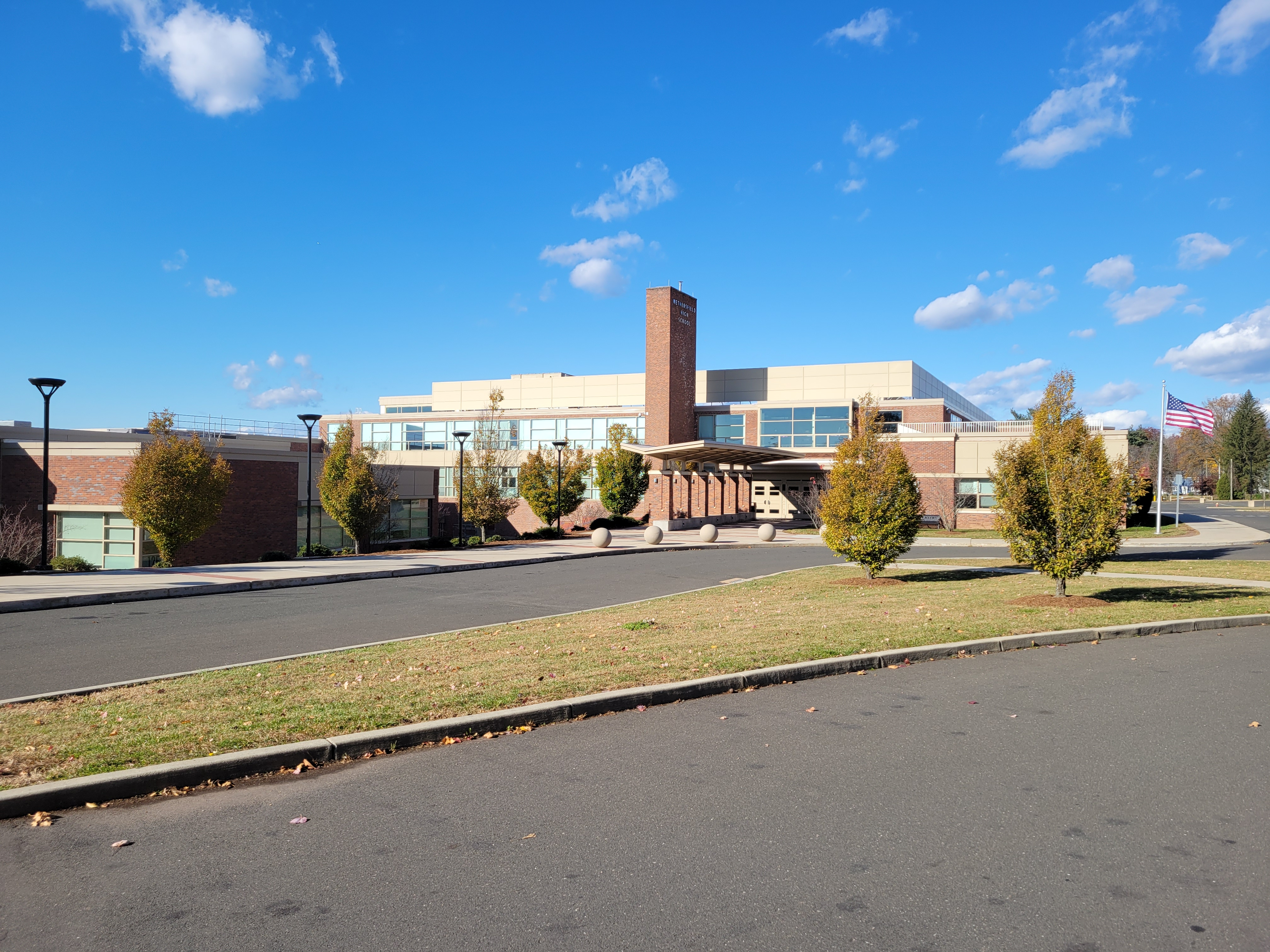

Location
- 411 Wolcott Hill Road; Wethersfield, Connecticut 06109; United States
- Coordinates: 41°42′28″N 72°40′16″W

Information
- Type: Public
- Established: 1952 (74 years ago)
- School district: Wethersfield School District
- Superintendent: Michael Emmett
- CEEB code: 070925
- Principal: Siobhan O'Connor
- Teaching staff: 84.00 (FTE)
- Grades: 9-12
- Enrollment: 1,126 (2023-2024)
- Student to teacher ratio: 13.40
- Colors: Navy blue and white
- Mascot: Eagle
- Team name: Eagles
- Newspaper: The Phoenix
- Yearbook: The Elm
- Website: wps.wethersfield.me/schools/wethersfield-high-school

Wethersfield High School is a high school in Wethersfield, Connecticut, United States.

== Awards ==
- Wethersfield High School was recognized as a National Blue Ribbon School in 1996.
- The Wethersfield High School Design Engineering Team placed first nationally in the AbilityOne Design Challenge in 2013 and 2014.
- Wethersfield High School's Boys varsity soccer has won 16 state championships (1948, 1949, 1954, 1955, 1957, 1968, 1975, 1982, 1984, 1991, 1999, 2000, 2002, 2004, 2008, 2021).

== Structure ==
Wethersfield High School opened in 1952, with several small renovations taking place in 1957, 1970, and 1993. The current school building standing on the property is a multi-story brick modern-style structure.

By the 2010s the school did not meet current educational curriculum requirements, did not address current safety standards, and was not code-compliant for individuals with disabilities. The aging building was evaluated and a referendum was passed for a "Renovate As New" construction plan. The renovation started in October 2013 with a planned completion date of April 2017. It was fully completed by January 2017.

== Notable alumni ==
- Ryan Costello, professional baseball player
- Tony DiCicco - professional goaltender and United States women's national soccer team coach; graduated in 1968
- Betsey Johnson - fashion designer; graduated in 1960
- Mark Linn-Baker - actor; graduated in 1972
- Chris Murphy - U.S Senator
- Tyler Murphy - NFL player with the Miami Dolphins
- Steve Roslonek - children's music performer
- Colin McDonald - professional hockey player
- Christopher Shinn - playwright
- Mark Tetto - television personality residing in South Korea
