= Wethersfield, Connecticut =

Town in Connecticut, United States

- Town
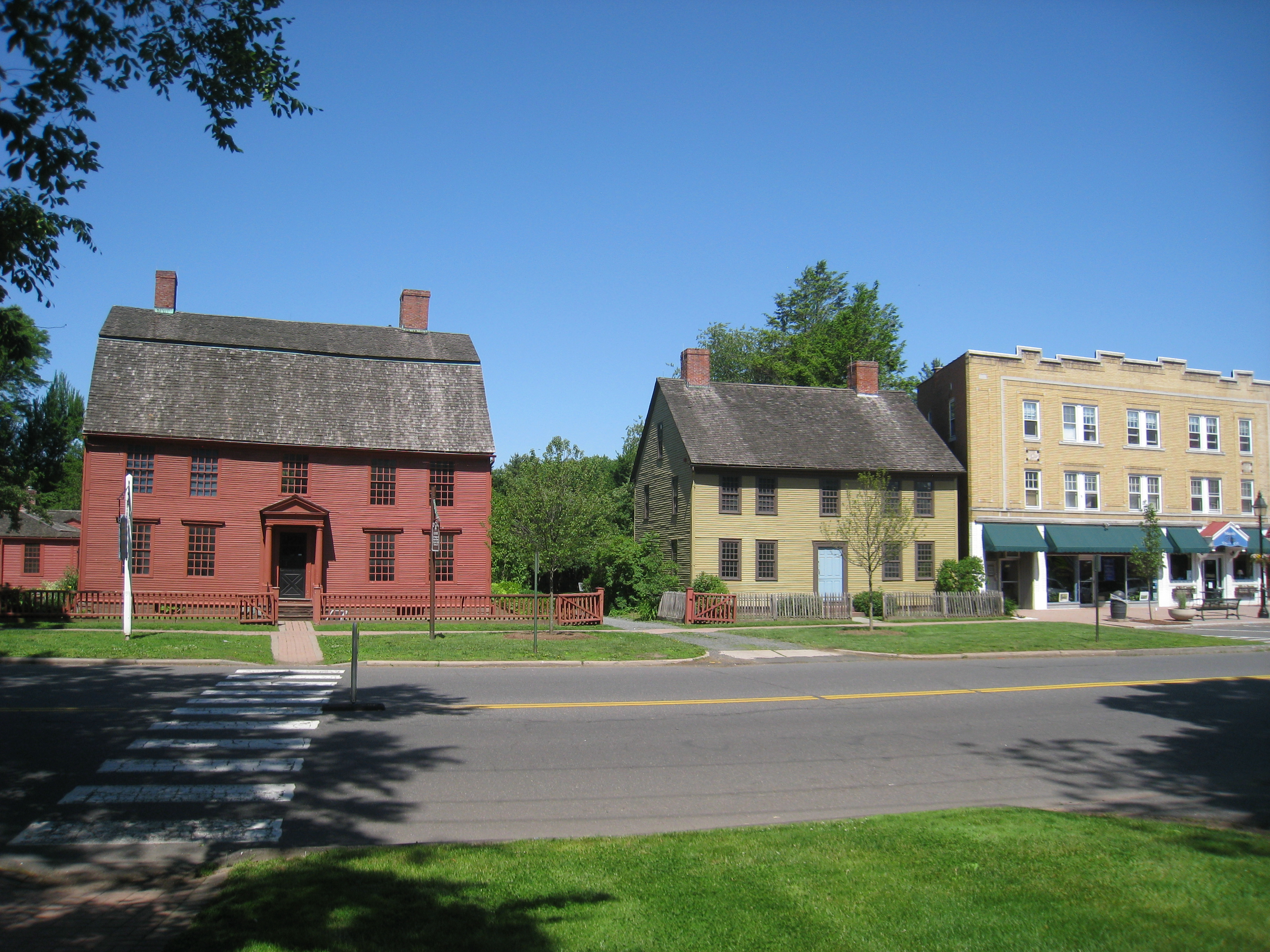
- Joseph Webb and Isaac Stevens houses

- Flag Seal
- Motto: Ye Most Ancient Town in Connecticut
- Coordinates: 41°42′51″N 72°39′09″W
- Country: United States
- U.S. state: Connecticut
- County: Hartford
- Region: Capitol Region
- Settled: October 1634
- Incorporated: February 21, 1637
- Named for: Wethersfield, Essex

Government
  - Type: Council-manager
  - Town manager: Frederick J. Presley Town Council: Mayor Ken Lesser (D); Deputy Mayor Matthew Forrest (D); Rich Bailey (R); Shelley Carbone (R); Cynthia Clancy (D); Miki Duric (D); Jane Roets (D); Brianna Timbro (R); Emily Zambrello (D)

Area
  - Total: 13.1 sq mi (34.0 km^{2})
  - Land: 12.3 sq mi (31.9 km^{2})
  - Water: 0.81 sq mi (2.1 km^{2})
- Elevation: 43 ft (13 m)

Population (2020)
  - Total: 27,298
  - Density: 2,220/sq mi (856/km^{2})
- Time zone: UTC−5 (Eastern)
  - Summer (DST): UTC−4 (Eastern)
- ZIP Code: 06109
- Area codes: 860/959
- FIPS code: 09-84900
- GNIS feature ID: 212042
- Website: wethersfieldct.gov

Wethersfield (/ˈwɛð.ərsfild/ WEH-thers-feeld) is a town located in Hartford County, Connecticut, United States. It is located immediately south of Hartford along the Connecticut River. The town is part of the Capitol Planning Region. The population was 27,298 at the time of the 2020 census.

Many records from colonial times spell the name "Weathersfield" and "Wythersfield", while Native Americans called it Pyquag. "Watertown" is a variant name.

The neighborhood known as Old Wethersfield is the state's largest historic district, spanning 2 sq mi (5.2 km^{2}) and containing 1,100 buildings, dating to the 17th, 18th and 19th centuries. The town is primarily served by Interstate 91.

== History ==
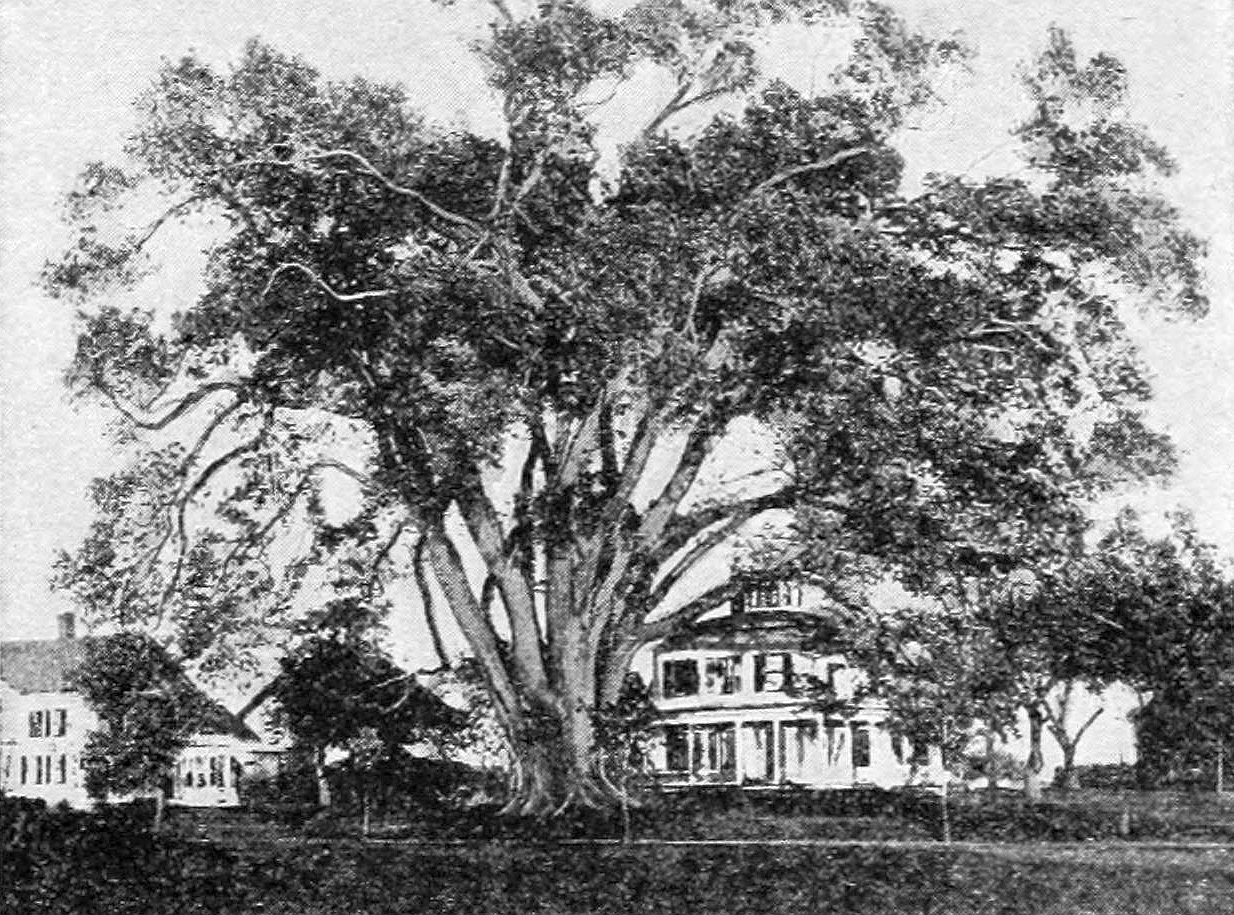
The Wethersfield elm, pictured in 1917, at 27 ft (8.2 m) was the largest in New England in circumference.

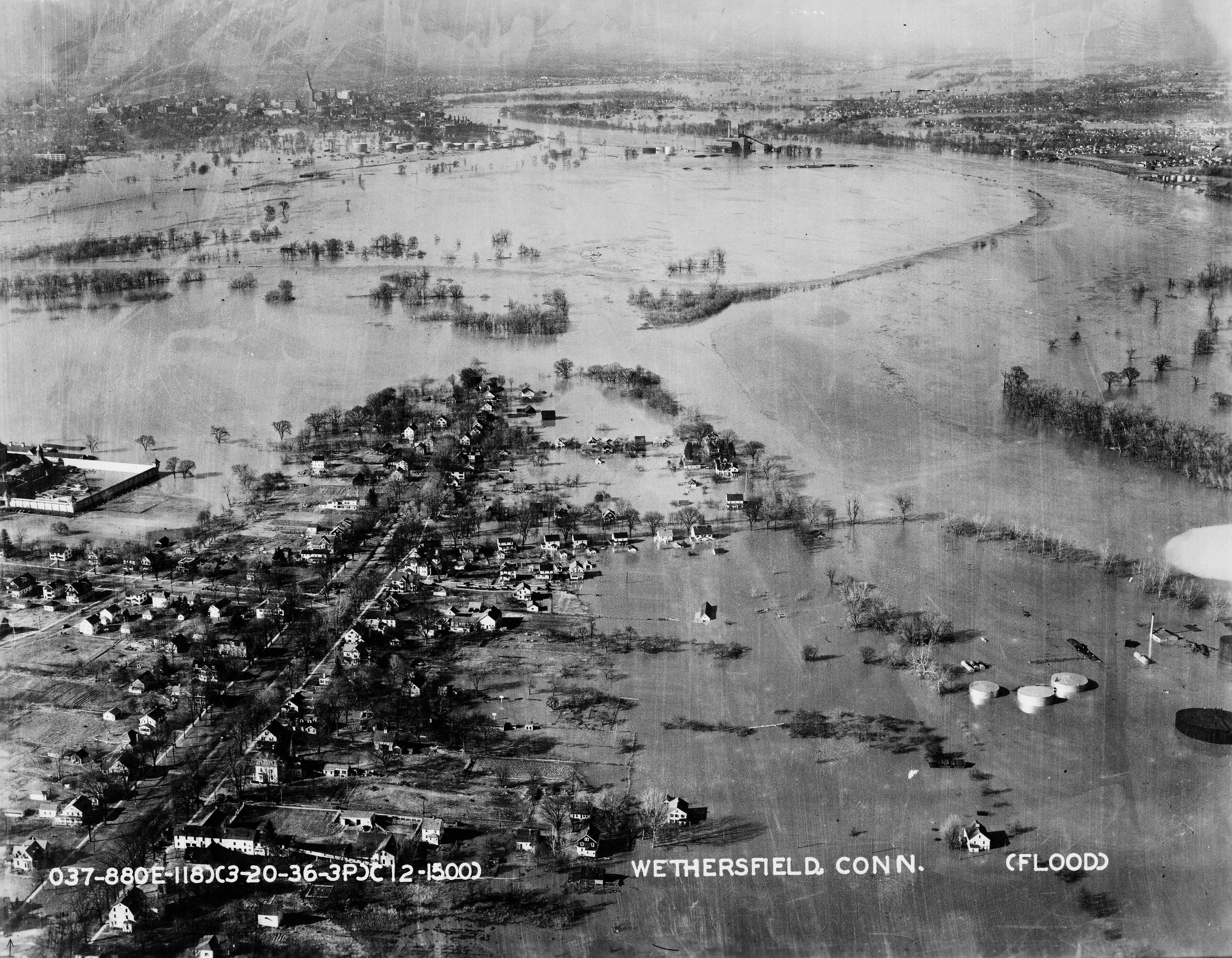
Flooding, 1936

Founded in 1634 by a Puritan settlement party of "10 Men", including John Oldham, Robert Seeley, Thomas Topping, and Nathaniel Foote, Wethersfield is arguably the oldest town in Connecticut, depending on the interpretation of when a remote settlement qualifies as a "town". Along with Windsor and Hartford, Wethersfield is represented by one of the three grapevines on the Flag of Connecticut, signifying the state's three oldest English settlements. The town was named by colonists for Wethersfield, a village in the English county of Essex. The town was previously called "Watertown", named after Watertown, Massachusetts, until February 21, 1637, when it was incorporated as a town along with Windsor and Hartford. The town established the Old Wethersfield Village Cemetery as its first burying ground on Hungry Hill in 1638.

During the Pequot War, on April 23, 1637, Wangunk Chief Sequin, who had lived with the colonists in Wethersfield but had been forced out after a few years, attacked Wethersfield with Pequot help. They killed six men and three women, a number of cattle and horses, and took two young girls captive. They were daughters of Abraham Swain or William Swaine (sources vary), and were later ransomed by Dutch traders.

Four witch trials and three executions for witchcraft occurred in the town in the 17th century. Mary Johnson was convicted of witchcraft and executed in 1648, Joan and John Carrington in 1651. In 1669, landowner Katherine Harrison was convicted, and although her conviction was reversed, she was banished and her property seized by her neighbors.

From 1716 to 1718, the Collegiate School was briefly located in Wethersfield; it moved to New Haven and developed over the decades as Yale University.

Silas Deane, envoy to France during the American Revolutionary War, lived in the town. His house is now preserved and operated as part of the Webb-Deane-Stevens Museum. In May 1781, at the Webb House on Main Street, General George Washington and French Lt. Gen. Rochambeau planned the Siege of Yorktown, which culminated in the surrender of Britain and independence of the colonies.

The Wethersfield Volunteer Fire Department was chartered by the Connecticut Legislature on May 12, 1803, making it the first formally chartered fire department in the state. It is one of the oldest chartered volunteer fire department in continuous existence in the United States.

Wethersfield was "for a century at least, the centre of the onion trade in New England", during the late 1700s and early to middle 1800s. "Outsiders dubbed the Connecticut village 'Oniontown,' with a crosshatch of affection and derision, for this was home of the world-famous Wethersfield red onion."

In addition, the town was home to William G. Comstock, a well-known 19th-century gardening expert and author of the era's most prominent gardening book, Order of Spring Work. In 1820, Comstock founded what would become Comstock, Ferre & Company, America's oldest continuously operating seed company. It pioneered the commercial sale of sealed packets of seeds, as he had learned from the Amish. Other nationally prominent seed companies in and around the town developed from this agricultural past.

A meteorite fell on Wethersfield on November 8, 1982. It was the second meteorite to fall in the town in the span of 11 years, as the first crashed on April 8, 1971. It crashed through the roof of a house without injuring the occupants, as had been the case with the first meteorite as well. The 1971 meteorite was sold to the Smithsonian, and the 1982 meteorite was taken up as part of a collection at the Yale Peabody Museum.

== Demographics ==
Historical population
Census	Pop.	Note	%±
1820	3,825		—
1840	3,824		—
1850	2,523		−34.0%
1860	2,705		7.2%
1870	2,693		−0.4%
1880	2,173		−19.3%
1890	2,271		4.5%
1900	2,637		16.1%
1910	3,148		19.4%
1920	4,342		37.9%
1930	7,512		73.0%
1940	9,644		28.4%
1950	12,533		30.0%
1960	20,561		64.1%
1970	26,662		29.7%
1980	26,013		−2.4%
1990	25,651		−1.4%
2000	26,271		2.4%
2010	26,668		1.5%
2020	27,298		2.4%
U.S. Decennial Census

As of the 2000 census, there were 26,268 people, 11,214 households, and 7,412 families residing in the town. The population density was 2,119.9 inhabitants per square mile (818.5/km^{2}). There were 11,454 housing units at an average density of 924.3 per square mile (356.9/km^{2}). The racial makeup of the town was 93.19% White, 2.09% Black or African American, 0.08% Native American, 1.58% Asian, 0.02% Pacific Islander, 1.82% from other races, and 1.22% from two or more races. Hispanic or Latino of any race were 4.19% of the population.

There were 11,214 households, out of which 25.2% had children under the age of 18 living with them, 53.9% were married couples living together, 9.6% had a female householder with no husband present, and 33.9% were non-families. 30.2% of all households were made up of individuals, and 15.9% had someone living alone who was 65 years of age or older. The average household size was 2.31 and the average family size was 2.89.

The town population was distributed with 20.1% under the age of 18, 4.8% from 18 to 24, 26.6% from 25 to 44, 25.1% from 45 to 64, and 23.5% who were 65 years of age or older. The median age was 44 years. For every 100 females, there were 86.6 males. For every 100 females age 18 and over, there were 82.4 males.

The median income for a household in the town was $53,289, and the median income for a family was $68,154. (These figures had risen to $66,044 and $86,432 respectively as of a 2007 estimate.) Males had a median income of $43,998 versus $37,443 for females. The per capita income for the town was $28,930. About 2.4% of families and 4.4% of the population were below the poverty line, including 3.8% of those under age 18 and 5.5% of those age 65 or over.

== Economy ==
=== Top employers ===
Top employers in Wethersfield according to the town's 2021 Comprehensive Annual Financial Report

#	Employer	# of Employees
1	State of Connecticut	810
2	Town of Wethersfield	753
3	Hartford Healthcare At Home	117
4	HomeGoods	108
5	Patient Care, Inc.	107
6	Qualidigm	101
7	DSG Yankee	79
8	Hooters	78
9	Corpus Christi School	55
10	Denny's	50

The Connecticut Department of Correction and the Connecticut Department of Motor Vehicles have their headquarters in Wethersfield.

Due to its proximity to the state capital at Hartford, Wethersfield is the site of several State of Connecticut agencies:

- The Department of Motor Vehicles office and testing location at 60 State Street.
- The Department of Labor is headquartered at 200 Folly Brook Boulevard.
- The Department of Correction is headquartered at 24 Wolcott Hill Road.
- The Superior Court Operations Unit is located at 225 Spring Street.
- The Court Support Services Division is located at 936 Silas Deane Highway.

The Wethersfield Chamber of Commerce has over 150 member institutions and hosts community events throughout the year.

== Arts and culture ==
=== Landmarks and historic district ===
Three buildings in Wethersfield are designated as historic landmarks by the National Register of Historic Places:

- Buttolph-Williams House, 249 Broad Street (added December 24, 1968)
- Joseph Webb House, 211 Main Street (added November 15, 1966)
- Silas Deane House, 203 Main Street (added November 6, 1970)

In 1970, Old Wethersfield, the district bounded by Hartford, the railroad tracks, I-91 and Rocky Hill, was added to the National Register of Historic Places. This is the largest historic district in Connecticut, with two square miles containing 1,100 buildings, many dating back to the 18th and 19th centuries.

=== Other points of interest ===
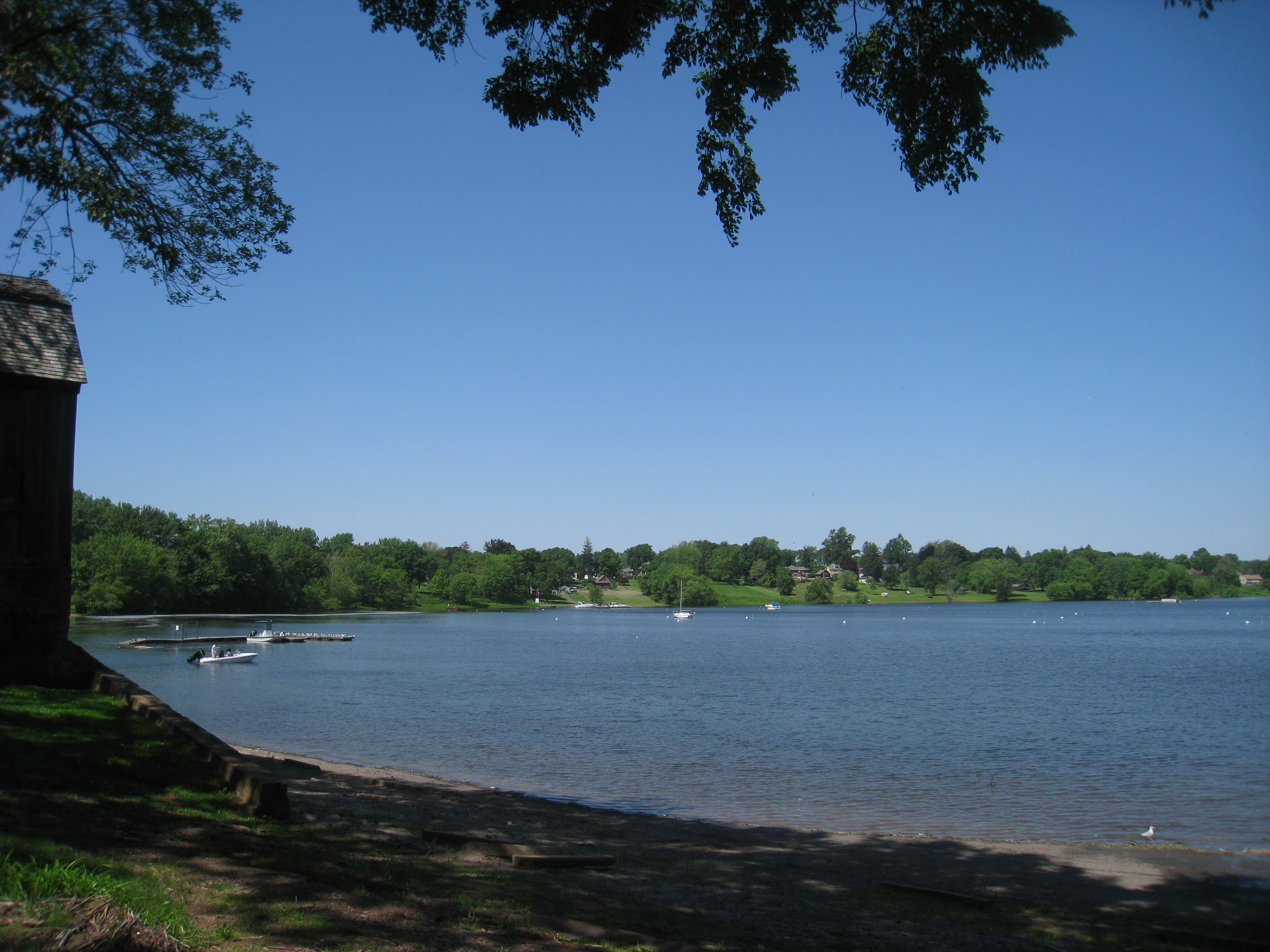
Wethersfield Cove

- Old Wethersfield Village Cemetery
- Broad Street Green
- Roger Butler House
- Captain James Francis House
- Great Meadows (Connecticut River)|Great Meadows
- Heritage Way – a "linear park" and multi-use path that connects Wethersfield's open areas and recreation facilities
- Hurlbut-Dunham House
- Keeney Memorial Culture Center – home of the Wethersfield Museum and Visitor Center
- Millwoods Park/Pond
- Wethersfield Cove
- Wethersfield Historical Society
- Wethersfield Skate Park
- John Chester Willard Pool
- Wintergreen Woods – 100 acres (0.40 km^{2}) forest with vernal pools and walking trails
- Wethersfield High School (Connecticut)
- Eleanor Buck Wolf Nature Center
- 9/11 Memorial Sports Center

=== Music ===
The historic First Church of Christ, Wethersfield, is the home of the Albert Schweitzer Organ Festival.

The Wethersfield Historical Society sponsors free outdoor concerts throughout the summer.

=== Community events ===
Community Events
Event	Time of Year	Location	Organizer
Cove Park Fireworks	Early June	Cove Park	Town of Wethersfield
Wethersfield Farmers Market	Summer Thursdays	220 Hartford Avenue	Wethersfield EDIC & Tourism Commission
Wethersfield Cornfest	Mid-September	Broad Street Green	Wethersfield Chamber of Commerce
Scarecrows Along Main Street	Early Fall	Main Street	Old Wethersfield Shopkeepers Association
Cove Side Carnival	Mid-October	Cove Park	Keane Foundation
Holidays on Main	Early December	Broad Street Green	Wethersfield Chamber of Commerce

== Sports ==
=== Running ===
The Old Wethersfield 5K & 10K is an annual road race that takes place in the Old Wethersfield section of town. Both races begin and end at Cove Park on Hartford Avenue. The event is put on by the Hartford Marathon Foundation and typically takes place at the end of August. The 2017 edition of the 10K is the state championship race for the USATF Connecticut Grand Prix Series as well as the final event of the HMF 10K Challenge Series.

== Education ==
The Wethersfield public school system encompasses Wethersfield High School, Silas Deane Middle School, and five elementary schools: Highcrest School, Charles Wright School, Emerson-Williams School, Alfred W. Hanmer School, and Samuel B. Webb School.

In addition to traditional public schools, Wethersfield also offers parochial and magnet school choices. The CREC Discovery Academy is a Pre-Kindergarten through fifth grade magnet school designed with a focus on STEM education. The Corpus Christi School is a Catholic school of approximately 400 students from Pre-Kindergarten through eighth grade. It was one of only fifty private schools named as a 2012 National Blue Ribbon School by the U.S. Secretary of Education, in the category of "Exemplary High Performing."

== Government ==
=== Federal ===
Congressional Representatives
Representative	Chamber	Party
Richard Blumenthal	Senate	Dem
Chris Murphy	Senate	Dem
John B. Larson	House of Representatives	Dem

=== State ===
General Assembly Representatives
Representative	Chamber	District	Party
Amy Morrin Bello	House of Representatives	28th	Dem
Kerry Wood	House of Representatives	29th	Dem

Connecticut Senate
Representative	Chamber	District	Party
John Fonfara	Senate	1st	Dem
Matthew Lesser	Senate	9th	Dem

Wethersfield is home to the headquarters of the Connecticut Department of Labor.

=== Municipal ===
Ken Lesser, mayor.

== Infrastructure and services ==
=== Transportation ===
==== Bus ====
As of 2013, Greater Hartford's major system of public transportation is Connecticut Transit (CT Transit), a Connecticut Department of Transportation–owned bus service operating routes throughout the New Haven, Stamford, Hartford and other metro areas. Wethersfield is served by route numbers 43, 47, 53, 55, 61, and 91.

==== Roads ====
Major roads include:

- Main Street in Old Wethersfield
- Connecticut Route 287 (Prospect Street)
- Connecticut Route 175 (Wells Road)
- Connecticut Route 99 (Silas Deane Highway)
- Connecticut Route 15 and U.S. Route 5 (Berlin Turnpike and Wilbur Cross Highway)
- Connecticut Route 3 (Maple Street and Putnam Bridge)
- Interstate 91 (Exits 25–26)

==== Rail ====
Hartford station is the nearest rail station. Wethersfield was once connected to Hartford by streetcar and by passenger service on the Valley Railroad. Its tracks still provide a route for sporadic freight trains between Hartford and Old Saybrook.

=== Police ===
The Wethersfield Police Department is headquartered at 250 Silas Deane Highway. In addition to normal police service, the department maintains a Marine Patrol Unit, a Special Response Dive Team, a Special Response Tactics Team, a DARE youth drug awareness program, and a Police Explorer program.

=== Fire services ===
The town has three volunteer fire stations. The year 2003 marked the formal 200th Anniversary of the Wethersfield Volunteer Fire Department. Wethersfield has the oldest volunteer fire company in Connecticut, and in New England.

=== Postal services ===
The United States Postal Service operates the Wethersfield Post Office at 67 Beaver Rd. The Town zip code is 06109. The Wethersfield Post Office is a fully trained United States Passport acceptance facility.

== Notable people ==
- Charles McLean Andrews (1863–1943), historian
- William Watson Andrews (1810–1897), clergyman
- Steven Anzovin (1954–2005), American non-fiction author
- Dick Bertel (1931–2023), American media personality and broadcast executive
- Elizabeth Canning (1734–1773), English maid notoriously exiled for perjury
- Kenneth F. Cramer (1894–1954), U.S. Army Major General and Chief of the National Guard Bureau
- James Curtiss (1803–1859), Mayor of Chicago
- Silas Deane (1737–1789), first American diplomat
- John Deming (c. 1615–1705), a founder of Wethersfield and an original patentee of Connecticut Colony
- Tony DiCicco (1948–2017), coach, United States women's national soccer team
- Bruce Edwards (1954–2004), Tom Watson's caddy of almost 30 years
- Nathaniel Foote (1592–1644), an original settler
- Thomas Ian Griffith (born 1962), actor, producer, screenwriter, martial artist
- Betsey Johnson (born 1942), fashion designer
- Mark Linn-Baker (born 1954), actor and director
- Colin McDonald (born 1984), professional hockey player
- John Mehegan (1916–1984), jazz pianist
- William J. Miller (1899–1950), Congressman from Connecticut
- Stephen Mix Mitchell (1743–1835), United States Senator and Connecticut Chief Justice
- Chris Murphy (born 1973), United States Senator
- Tyler Murphy, Former quarterback for the University of Florida Gators; starting quarterback for the Boston College Eagles
- John Oldham (1592–1636), an original settler
- John Pinone (born 1961), basketball player and coach
- Jane Elizabeth Robbins (1860–1946), physician and social worker
- Annabella Sciorra (born 1960), actress
- Elizabeth Scott (1708–1776), poet, hymnwriter
- Robert Seeley (1602–1668), an original settler
- Christopher Shinn (born 1975), playwright
- Karen Smyers (born 1961), world champion triathlete
- David Spicer (1946–2017), organist and choirmaster
- Charles Stillman (1810–1875), founder of Brownsville, Texas
- Richard Treat (or Trott) (1584–1669), an original settler of Wethersfield and a Patentee of the Royal Charter of Connecticut
- Tom Tryon (1926–1991), actor and novelist
- Sophie Tucker (1887–1966), comedian and singer, interred in Emanuel Cemetery
- Levi Warner (1831–1911), Congressman from Connecticut
- Elmer Watson (1831–1911), Connecticut State Senate majority leader
- Thomas Welles (1590–1660), Governor of Connecticut Colony
- Benjamin Lee Whorf (1897–1941), linguist
- Elisha Williams (1694–1755), minister, legislator and judge
- Benjamin Wright (1770–1842), chief engineer of the Erie Canal
- Charles Wright (1811–1885), botanical explorer and collector
- Emily Wright (born 1980), songwriter, producer and engineer

== In popular culture ==
Wethersfield was the setting for the children's novel The Witch of Blackbird Pond by Elizabeth George Speare, as well as the setting of the one-act play The Valiant by Holworthy Hall and Robert Middlemas.

Actor-turned-author Thomas Tryon used his native Wethersfield as the setting for his action/romance novels The Wings of the Morning and In the Fire of Spring, as well as a mystery/horror novel The Other and a film of the same name.

The short film Disneyland Dream features the Barstow family from Wethersfield, including footage of their neighborhood.

In The Autobiography of Malcolm X, written with Alex Haley, Malcolm X recounts a car accident in which he was rear ended at a stop light while traveling through Wethersfield.

The novel Parrot and Olivier in America by two-time Booker Prize–winning Australian author Peter Carey was largely set in the town of Wethersfield. The novel touches on some hallmarks of its history including the predominance of onion farming and the old state prison.

The Disney Channel animated series The Owl House features the town of Gravesfield, Connecticut, where the main character Luz Noceda resided prior to entering the Boiling Isles. Gravesfield was partly inspired by Wethersfield, alongside show creator Dana Terrace's hometown of Hamden.
