= First Church of Christ, Congregational =

First Church of Christ, Congregational may refer to:

- First Church of Christ, Congregational (Farmington, Connecticut)
- First Church Congregational, Methuen, Massachusetts
- First Church of Christ, Congregational (Springfield, Massachusetts)

== See also ==
- First Church of Christ (disambiguation)
