= Old Wethersfield Village Cemetery =

Historic site in Hartford County, Connecticut

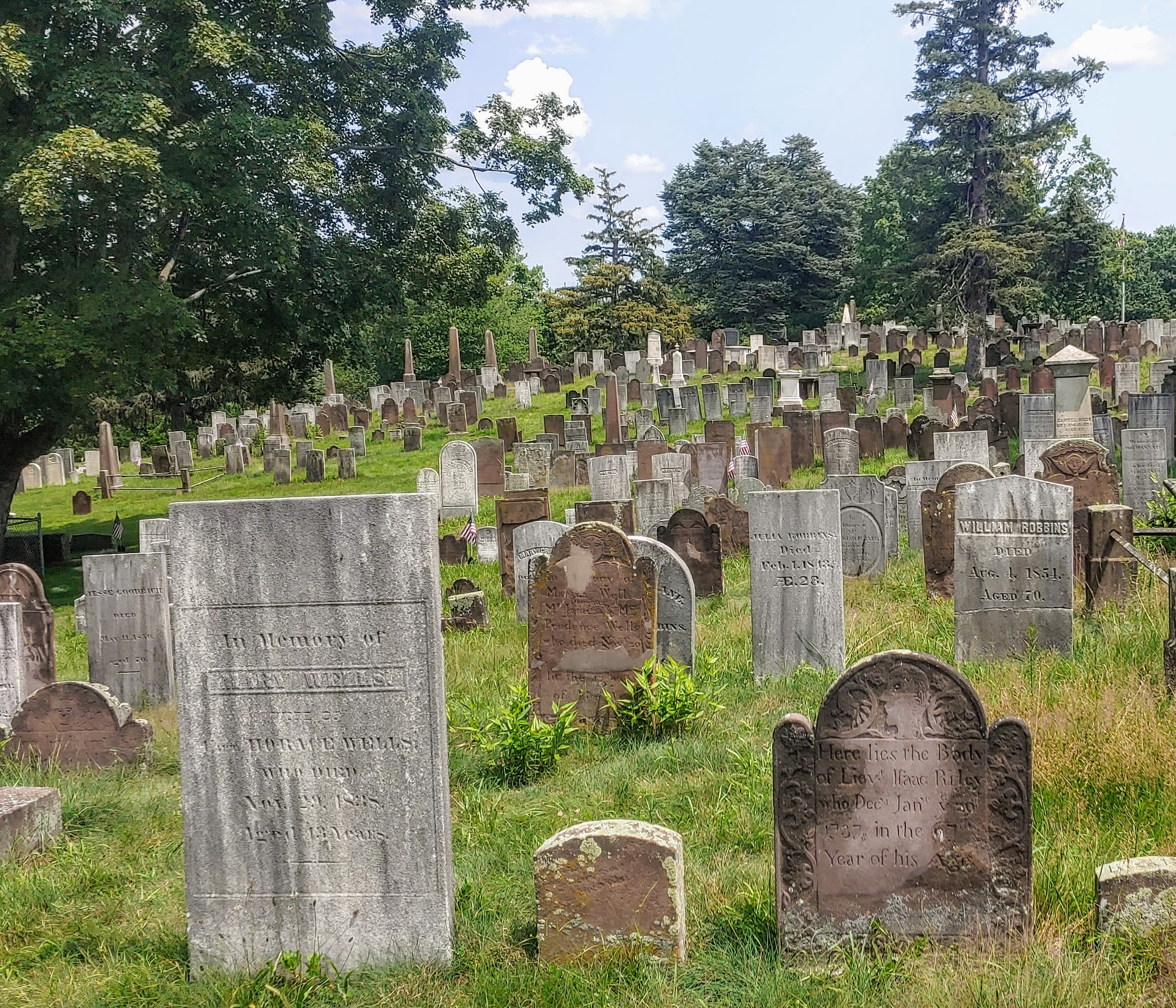
- Interactive map of Old Wethersfield Village Cemetery

Details
- Established: 1638 (388 years ago)
- Location: 1 Marsh Street, Wethersfield, Connecticut
- Coordinates: 41°42′45″N 72°38′6″W

Old Wethersfield Village Cemetery is a historic burying ground in Wethersfield, Connecticut, United States, which was established in 1638. It is the second-oldest burial ground in the state.

== History ==
The burying ground was established by the town of Wethersfield on Hungry Hill in 1638. As was the custom during the colonial period, burial plots were free of charge and were permitted wherever there was room. Though the burial ground was in use in the 17th century, very few markers from that period survived the centuries. This is likely because the earliest stones were made of wood or primitive fieldstones that deteriorated over time. With no local carvers, the cost of a grave marker to be bought and shipped made it a luxury for only the wealthiest families. Only three markers from the 17th century survive today.

In the 18th century, gravestones became more widely available, particularly those imported from the Portland, Bolton, and Manchester regions. Carvers who carved on Connecticut River Valley brownstone were especially popular and included the Stanclift family of Middletown, The Thomas Johnsons of Chatham, Peter and William Buckland of Manchester, Charles Doplph of Killingworth, and the Unknown Glastonbury Lady Carver. Many markers are also made from grey granite schist including those carved by Gershom Bartlett of Bolton, Peter Buckland of Manchester, Daniel Ritter of East Hartford, Josiah Manning of Franklin, and Aaron Haskins of Bolton. A small number of slate markers, most featuring deaths head designs were also shipped in from the Boston region. In the 1790s, Samuel Galpin moved to Wethersfield and became the town's first grave carver. He was very popular in Wethersfield and the surrounding areas and carved many tombstones from Portland sourced brownstone in the first few decades of the 19th century.

== Sources ==
- Slater, James A. (1987). The Colonial Burying Grounds of Connecticut and the Men Who Made Them (1st ed.). Hamden, Connecticut: Archon Books.
- Hosley, W. N. (1985). The Great River: Art & Society of the Connecticut Valley, 1635-1820 (1st ed.). Hartford, Connecticut: Wadsworth Atheneum.
- Forbes, H.M. (1927). Gravestones of Early New England and the Men Who Made Them 1653-1800 (1967 reprint ed.). New York: Da Capo Press. ISBN 9781625851963. LCCN 67027452.
