= Joseph Webb House =

Historic house in Connecticut

- U.S. National Register of Historic Places
- U.S. National Historic Landmark
- U.S. Historic district – Contributing property
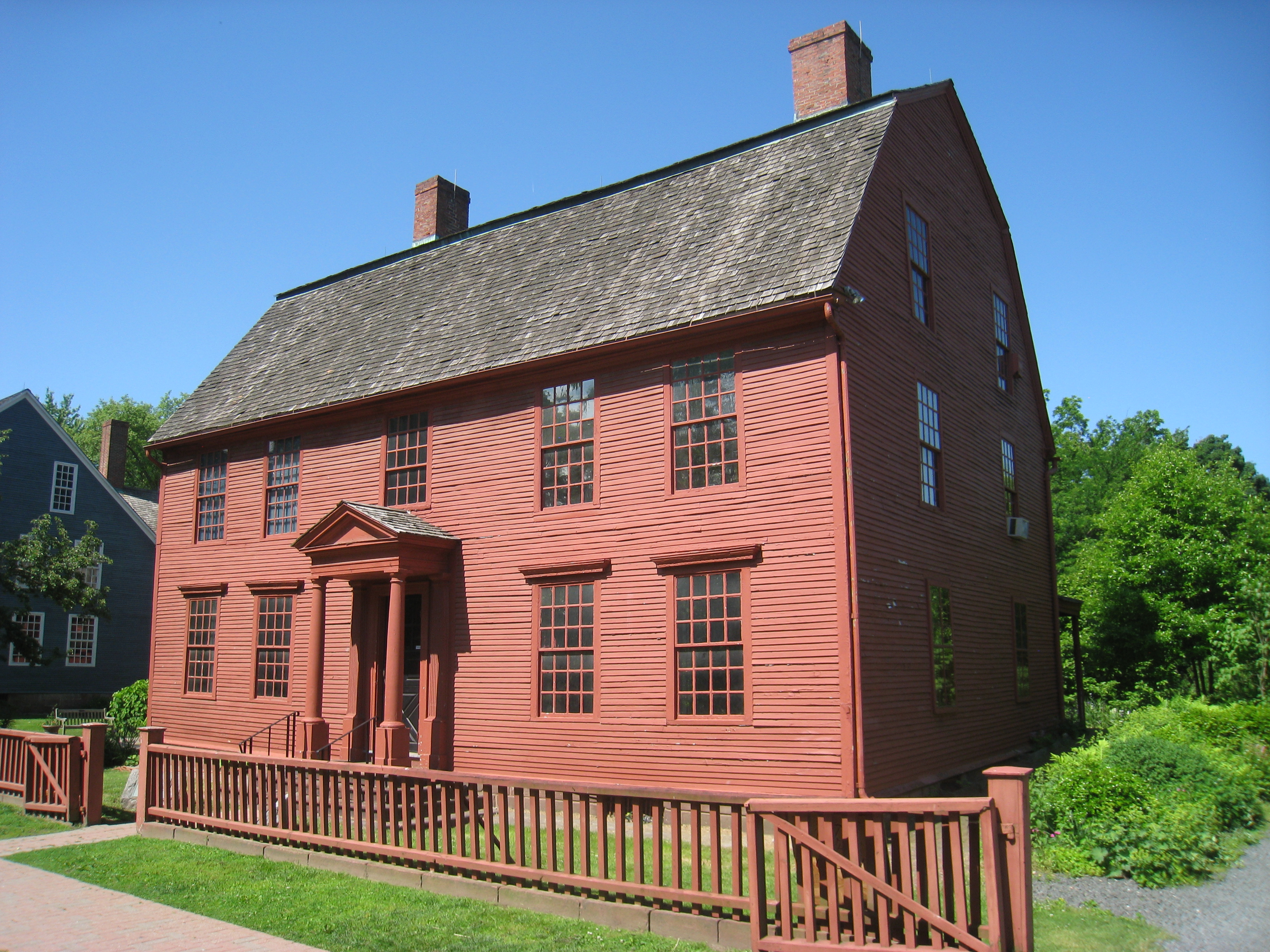
- Joseph Webb House in 2009

- Location within Connecticut Location within the United States
- Location: 211 Main Street, Wethersfield, Connecticut
- Coordinates: 41°42′41.6″N 72°39′13.4″W
- Built: 1752
- Architect: Joseph Webb, Sr.
- Architectural style: Georgian
- Part of: Old Wethersfield Historic District (ID70000719)
- NRHP reference No.: 66000885

Significant dates
- Added to NRHP: October 15, 1966
- Designated NHL: January 20, 1961
- Designated CP: December 29, 1970

The Joseph Webb House is a historic Georgian-style house at 211 Main Street in Wethersfield, Connecticut. It was designated a National Historic Landmark for its significance as the location of the five-day military conference between George Washington and French commander Rochambeau in 1781 during the American Revolutionary War that preceded the Siege of Yorktown, the last major battle of the war. Washington lodged at the house of Joseph Webb on May 17, 1781 in Old Wethersfield. The Joseph Webb House is owned by the Webb-Deane-Stevens Museum and serves as its headquarters. The interior has been restored to an 18th-century appearance and the grounds feature a Colonial Revival garden and 19th-century barn in back.

The house was built in 1752 for Joseph Webb and remained in the family until around 1820, when it was sold to Martin Welles. It remained in the Welles family until 1913, when it was purchased by a group of businessmen who intended to use it as an athenaeum or a library, but a lack of funds led to its sale to Wallace Nutting. The house opened in 1916 as a part of Nutting's "Chain of Colonial Picture Houses". Nutting sold the house to the National Society of the Colonial Dames of America in 1919, who continue to operate it as a historic house museum. Nutting's murals and interpretive Colonial Revival elements were integrated with an exhibit showing his influence in 1996.

== History ==
Judah Wright framed the house in 1752 for Joseph Webb. The 3 1/2-story house was designed with a large gambrel roof that provides extra storage space. Webb was a successful merchant who had ships trading in the West Indies and ran a local store; he married Mehitabel Nott and had six children before his death at age 34. The executor of the estate was Silas Deane, who assisted Mrs. Webb financially and emotionally. Deane later married her and built a house next door. Joseph Webb Jr. was 12 at the time of his father's death, and he inherited the house.

Joseph Webb Jr. was also a successful merchant. He married Abigail Chester in 1774, and the couple remained in the house; they became well-known hosts and their house was nicknamed "Hospitality Hall".

A portrait of George Washington displayed in one of the bedrooms

The house's fame stems from George Washington's five night stay there, where he planned the Siege of Yorktown with French general Comte de Rochambeau. Smithsonian magazine writer Howard Hugh suggests that the red wool flock wallpaper in the bedchamber where Washington slept was hung in anticipation of the general's arrival.

Webb sold the house in 1790 and it passed through different owners until it was purchased by Judge Martin Welles around 1820. Welles modernized the southern half of the property. The house remained in the Welles family until the death of Welles' grandson in 1913. It was purchased by a group of businessmen who sought to operate it as an athenaeum or a library, but a lack of funds resulted in its sale to Wallace Nutting in 1916.

== Wallace Nutting ==
Antiquarian Wallace Nutting bought the Joseph Webb House on February 9, 1916 to serve as a sales area and studio. Lyle writes that Nutting intended to use the house "as one of the links in his 'Chain of Colonial Picture Houses'—all important historic sites located in New England that were part of his business plan to promote a nostalgic appreciation of 'Old America.'" Nutting commissioned painted murals for the front parlors and hallway.

On July 4, 1916, the Webb house was opened to the public with a 25 cent admission charge, but the American entry into World War I and the rationing of gasoline took its toll on Nutting's business. Nutting sold the house in 1919 to The National Society of the Colonial Dames of America in Connecticut, which opened it to the public as a historic house museum.

== Colonial Dames ==
The National Society of the Colonial Dames of America and a team of preservationists restored the house to the state it was in before Nutting's changes with the intention of restoring the appearance of the original construction.

The murals commissioned by Nutting were covered up with reproduction wallpapers, but a panel of the wall paper was torn off and the hallway murals were painted over. In 1996, the Dames acknowledged Wallace Nutting's interpretive focus of the Webb House and removed the wallpaper in the "Yorktown" parlor. An exhibit in the center hall of the house shows Wallace Nutting's influence.

The Webb-Deane-Stevens Museum gives tours of the house April through November but requires appointments for tours January through March. The house was declared a National Historic Landmark in 1961. It was added to the National Register of Historic Places on October 15, 1966.

== See also ==
- National Register of Historic Places listings in Hartford County, Connecticut
- List of National Historic Landmarks in Connecticut
- List of the oldest buildings in Connecticut
- March Route of Rochambeau's army
- List of historic sites preserved along Rochambeau's route
