= First Presbyterian Church (Sandusky, Ohio) =

Historic church in Ohio, United States

- Old First Church
- U.S. National Register of Historic Places
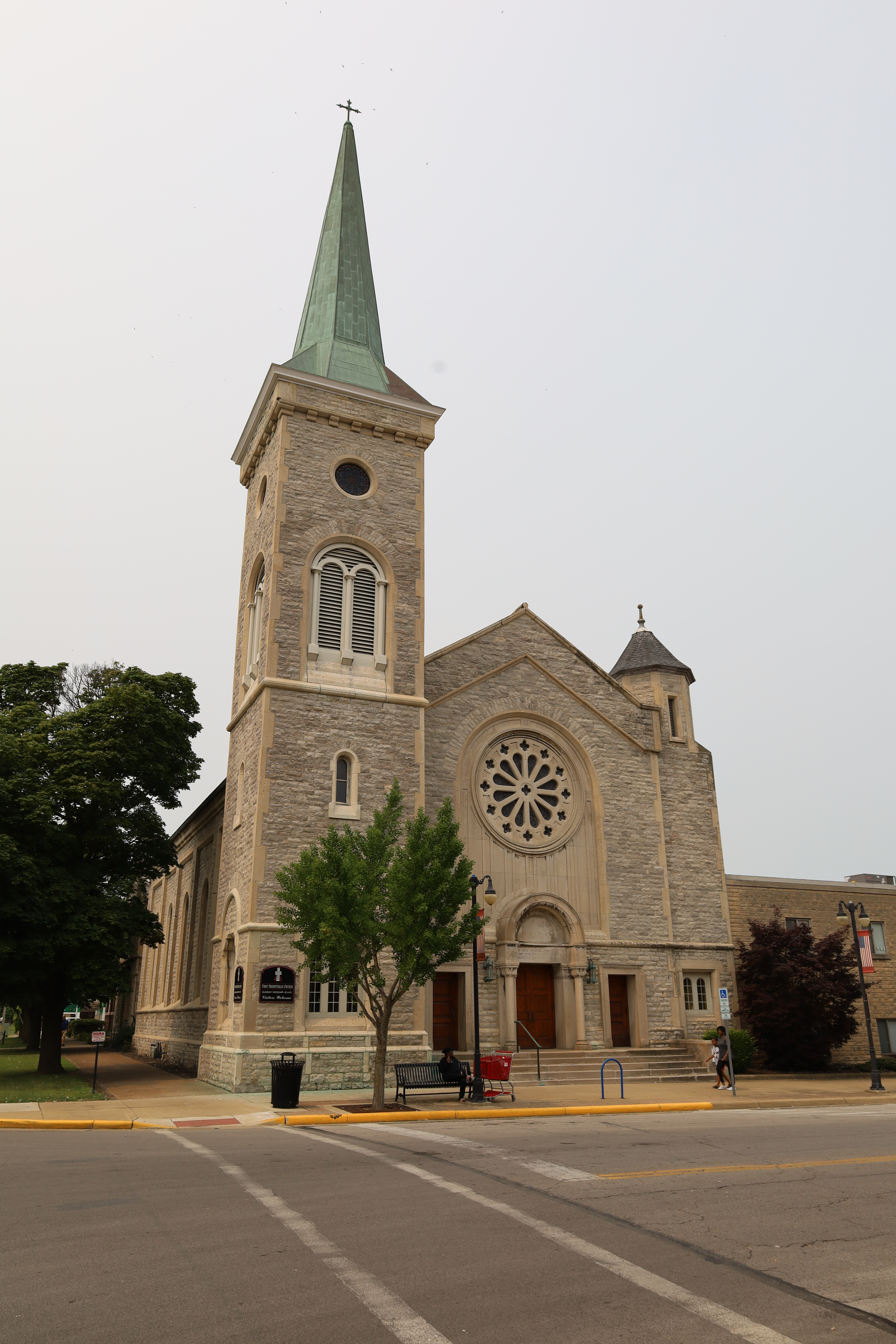
- The church in 2023

- Location within Ohio Location within the United States
- Location: 265 Jackson St., Sandusky, Ohio
- Coordinates: 41°27′15″N 82°42′46″W
- Area: less than one acre
- Built: 1853
- Architectural style: Romanesque
- MPS: Sandusky MRA
- NRHP reference No.: 82001430
- Added to NRHP: October 20, 1982

First Presbyterian Church is a historic church at 265 Jackson Street in Sandusky, Ohio.

It was built in 1853 and added to the National Register of Historic Places in 1982. As of 2012 it is affiliated with the Presbyterian Church (U.S.A.).
