= Old First Church (Huntington, New York) =

Historic church in New York, United States

- U.S. National Register of Historic Places
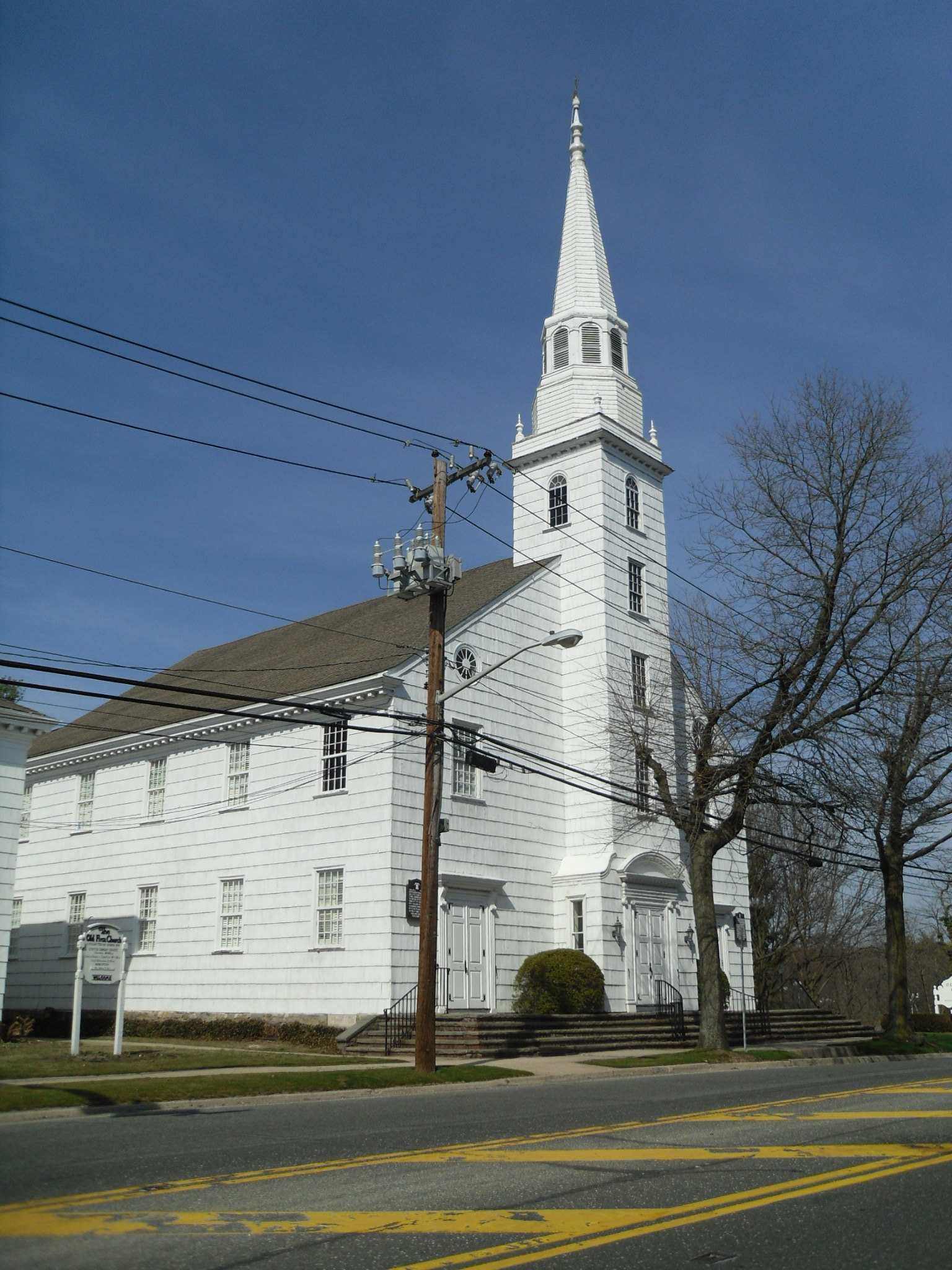
- Old First Church, March 2010

- Location within New York Location within the United States
- Location: 125 Main Street, Huntington, New York
- Coordinates: 40°52′28″N 73°25′11″W
- Area: 1 acre (0.40 ha)
- Built: 1784
- MPS: Huntington Town MRA
- NRHP reference No.: 85003500
- Added to NRHP: November 6, 1985

Old First Church is an historic Presbyterian church building at 125 Main Street in Huntington, Suffolk County, New York. It was built in 1784 and is a two and one-half-story building with a steeply pitched gable roof. About 1900, a two-story, five-gable-roofed addition was completed on the rear of the building. It features a tall, square, five-story bell tower that dominates the center of the main facade.

The church is actually the third church of the same name to stand in the area. The original was built in 1665, soon after the town's founding at what was the southwest corner of NY 25A and Spring Street. The first church was demolished when its size proved inadequate, even after expansion, and the second church erected in its present location in 1715. The second church was destroyed in 1782 for use in construction of fortifications by British troops occupying Huntington. The current church was rebuilt in the same location in 1784.

It was added to the National Register of Historic Places in 1985.
