= Old Wethersfield =

- Old Wethersfield Historic District
- U.S. National Register of Historic Places
- U.S. Historic district
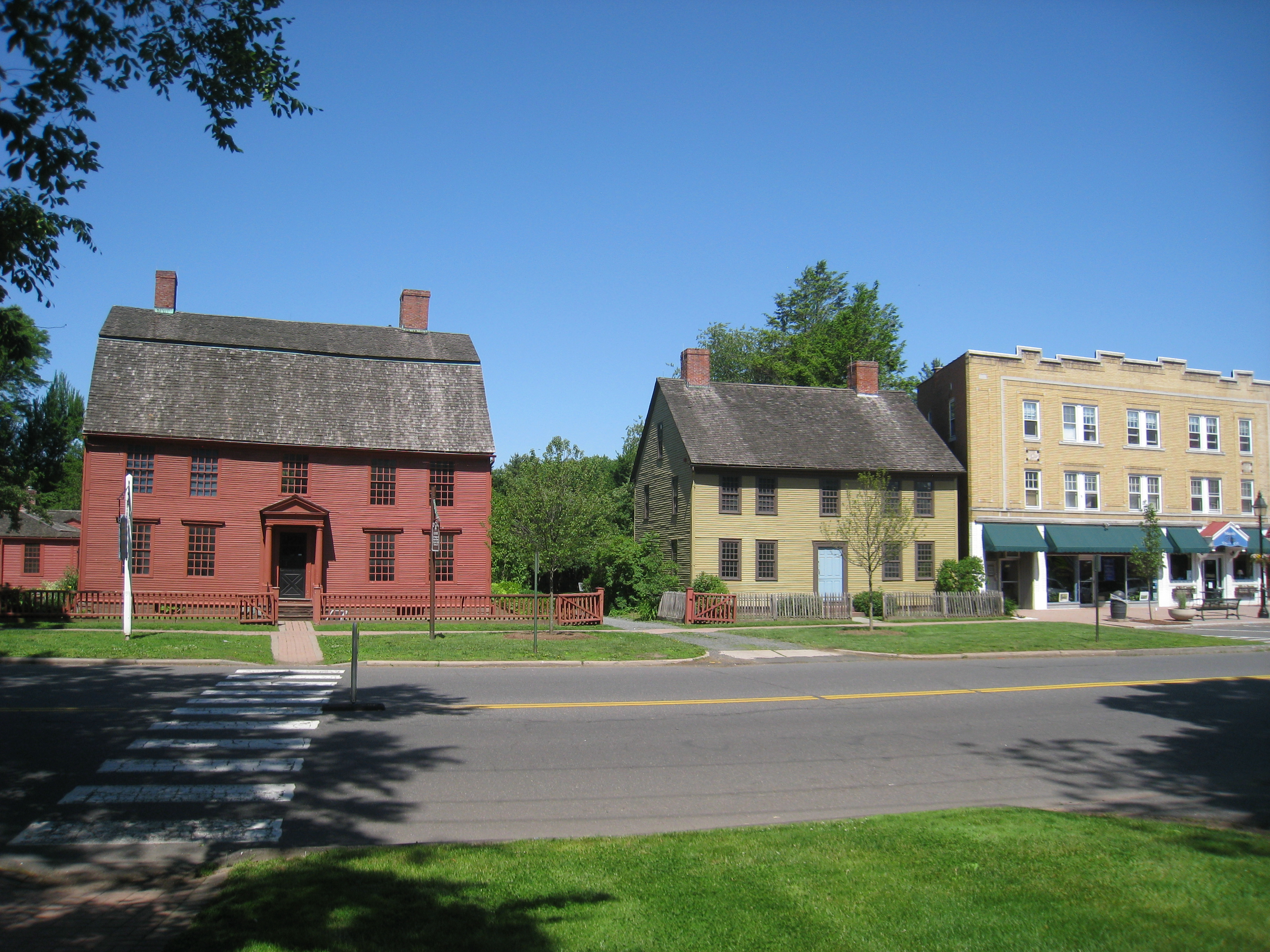
- Joseph Webb and Isaac Stevens Houses

- Location within Connecticut Location within the United States
- Location: Bounded by Hartford, Railroad Tracks, I-91, and Rocky Hill, Wethersfield, Connecticut
- Coordinates: 41°42′32″N 72°39′23″W
- Area: 1,300 acres (530 ha)
- Architect: Multiple
- Architectural style: Colonial, Federal
- NRHP reference No.: 70000719
- Added to NRHP: December 29, 1970

Old Wethersfield, also known as Old Wethersfield Historic District, and historically known as Watertown or Pyquag, is a section of the town of Wethersfield, Connecticut, roughly bounded by the borders of the adjacent city of Hartford and town of Rocky Hill, railroad tracks, and I-91. The site of the first permanent European-American settlement in the state of Connecticut, it was added to the National Register of Historic Places in 1970.

The land for this colonial settlement was acquired from the Massachusetts Bay Colony. Wethersfield served as a transportation hub on the Connecticut River in the early years.

The Old Wethersfield Historic District was established under town statutes in 1962, "to preserve and protect the many architectural phases of a Connecticut River Community in continual growth from 1634 to the present." Eight years later, in 1970, the Old Wethersfield Historic District was listed on the National Register of Historic Places. The village includes 50 houses that were built before the American Revolutionary War, plus about 250 additional houses built before the 20th century, about 100 of which were built earlier than the American Civil War.

The historic district listed on the National Register includes 1200 structures over 1,300 acres (5.3 km^{2}). Of these 100 date from colonial times. Many of the early frame and brick houses were built by sea captains around the town green.

There are three National Historic Landmarks in Old Wethersfield:

- Buttolph–Williams House — 249 Broad Street
- Joseph Webb House — 211 Main Street
- Silas Deane House — 203 Main Street

Another prominent historic building in the district is:

- First Church of Christ, Wethersfield

The district includes Wethersfield's green, which is "a slender diamond nearly a half-mile long".

== See also ==
- National Register of Historic Places listings in Hartford County, Connecticut
