= Gary Paulsen bibliography =

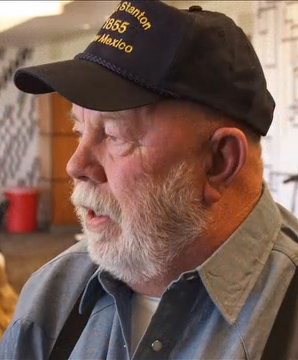
Gary Paulsen

This is a list of works by Gary Paulsen (May 17, 1939 – October 13, 2021), an American writer of children's and young adult fiction.

== Fiction ==
=== Brian's Saga ===
- Hatchet (1987)
- The River (Hatchet: The Return) (1991)
- Brian's Winter (Hatchet: Winter) (1996)
- Brian's Return (Hatchet: The Call) (1999)
- Brian's Hunt (2003)

=== Mr. Tucket Saga ===
- Mr. Tucket (1969)
- Call Me Francis Tucket (1995)
- Tucket's Ride (1997)
- Tucket's Gold (1999)
- Tucket's Home (2000)

=== Murphy series ===
- Murphy (1987)
- Murphy's Gold (1988)
- Murphy's Herd (1989)
- Murphy's War (1990)

Co-authored by Brian Burks

- Murphy's Stand (1993)
- Murphy's Ambush (1995)
- Murphy's Trail (1996)

=== Alida's series ===
- The Cookcamp (1991)
- Alida's Song (1999)
- The Quilt (2004)

=== World of Adventure ===
- The Legend of Red Horse Cavern (1994)
- Rodomonte's Revenge (Video Trap) (1994)
- Escape from Fire Mountain (1995)
- The Rock Jockeys (Devil's Wall) (1995)
- Hook 'Em Snotty! (1995)
- Danger on Midnight River (1995)
- The Gorgon Slayer (1995)
- Captive! (1995)
- Project – A Perfect World (Perfect Danger) (1996)
- The Treasure of El Patron (Treasure Ship) (1996)
- Skydive! (1996)
- The Seventh Crystal (1996)
- The Creature of Black Water Lake (1997)
- Time Benders (1997)
- Grizzly (1997)
- Thunder Valley (1998)
- Curse of the Ruins (1998)
- Flight of the Hawk (1998)

=== Tales to Tickle the Funnybone ===
- The Boy Who Owned the School (1990)
- Harris and Me (1993)
- The Schernoff Discoveries (1997)
- The Glass Cafe (2003)
- Molly McGinty Has a Really Good Day (2004)
- The Amazing Life of Birds: The Twenty-Day Puberty Journal of Duane Homer Leech (2006)

=== Culpepper Adventures ===
- The Case of the Dirty Bird (1992)
- Dunc's Doll (1992)
- Culpepper's Cannon (1992)
- Dunc Gets Tweaked (1992)
- Dunc's Halloween (1992)
- Dunc Breaks the Record (1992)
- Dunc and the Flaming Ghost (1992)
- Amos Gets Famous (1993)
- Dunc and Amos Hit the Big Top (1993)
- Dunc's Dump (1993)
- Dunc and the Scam Artists (1993)
- Dunc and Amos and the Red Tattoos (1993)
- Dunc's Undercover Christmas (1993)
- Wild Culpepper Cruise (1993)
- Dunc and the Haunted Castle (1993)
- Cowpokes and Desperadoes (1994)
- Prince Amos (1994)
- Coach Amos (1994)
- Amos and the Alien (1994)
- Dunc and Amos Meet the Slasher (1994)
- Dunc and the Greased Sticks of Doom (1994)
- Amos's Killer Concert Caper (1994)
- Amos Gets Married (1995)
- Amos Goes Bananas (1995)
- Dunc and Amos Go to the Dogs (1996)
- Amos and the Vampire (1996)
- Amos and the Chameleon Caper (1996)
- Amos Binder, Secret Agent (1997)
- Dunc and Amos on Thin Ice (1997)
- Super Amos (1997)

=== Liar, Liar series ===
- Liar, Liar: The Theory, Practice and Destructive Properties of Deception (2011)
- Flat Broke: The Theory, Practice and Destructive Properties of Greed (2011)
- Crush: The Theory, Practice and Destructive Properties of Love (2012)
- Vote: The Theory, Practice, and Destructive Properties of Politics (2013)
- Family Ties: The Theory, Practice, and Destructive Properties of Relatives (2014)

=== Other novels ===
- The Special War (1966)
- Some Birds Don't Fly (1968)
- The Death Specialists (1976)
- The Implosion Effect (1976)
- C. B. Jockey (1977) (alternate title of The C.B. Radio Caper?)
- The Golden Stick (1977)
- Tiltawhirl John (1977) (also known as Tasting the Thunder in the UK)
- The C. B. Radio Caper (1977)
- Foxman (1977)
- Winterkill (1977)
- The Curse of the Cobra (1977)
- The Green Recruit (1978)
- The Spitball Gang (1980)
- Compkill (1981)
- The Sweeper (1981)
- Clutterkill (1982)
- Dancing Carl (1983)
- Popcorn Days and Buttermilk Nights (1983)
- Tracker (1984)
- Dogsong (1985)
- Sentries (1986)
- The Crossing (1987)
- The Island (1988)
- Night Rituals (1989)
- The Voyage of the Frog (1989)
- The Winter Room (1989)
- Canyons (1990)
- Kill Fee (1990)
- The Foxman (1990)
- The Night the White Deer Died (1990)
- The Monument (1991)
- Clabbered Dirt, Sweet Grass (1992)
- The Haymeadow (1992) (known as The Fourteenth Summer in the UK)
- A Christmas Sonata (1992)
- Dogteam (1993)
- Nightjohn (1993)
- Sisters / Hermanas (1993)
- The Car (1994)
- The Tent (1995)
- The Tortilla Factory (1995)
- The Rifle (1995)
- Sarny (1997)
- Worksong (1997)
- Ice Race (1997)
- The Transall Saga (1998) (known as Blue Light in the UK)
- Soldier's Heart (1998)
- Canoe Days (1999)
- The Beet Fields (2000)
- The White Fox Chronicles (2000)
- The Time Hackers (2005)
- The Legend of Bass Reeves: Being the True and Fictional Account of the Most Valiant Marshal in the West (2006)
- Lawn Boy (2007)
- Mudshark (2009)
- Notes from the Dog (2009)
- Woods Runner (2010)
- Lawn Boy Returns (2010)
- Masters of Disaster (2010)
- Paintings from the Cave: Three Novellas
  - Man of the Iron Heads
  - Jo-Jo the Dog-Faced Girl
  - Erik's Rules
- Road Trip (2013) (with Jim Paulsen)
- Field Trip (2015) (with Jim Paulsen)
- Six Kids and a Stuffed Cat (2016)
- Fishbone's Song (2016)
- How to Train Your Dad (2021)
- Northwind (2022)

== Nonfiction ==
- The Grass-Eaters: Real Animals (1976)
- The Small Ones (1976)
- Hitting, Pitching, and Running (1976)
- Martin Luther King: The Man Who Climbed the Mountain (1976)
- Dribbling, Shooting, and Scoring (1976)
- Careers in an Airport (1977)
- Tackling, Running, and Kicking (1977)
- Riding, Roping, and Bulldogging (1977)
- Farm: A History And Celebration of the American Farmer (1977)
- Running, Jumping, and Throwing (1978)
- Successful Home Repair: When Not to Call the Contractor (1978)
- Forehanding and Backhanding (1978)
- Hiking and Backpacking (1978)
- Downhill, Hotdogging and Cross-Country (1979)
- Facing Off, Checking and Goaltending (1979)
- Launching, Floating High and Landing (1979)
- Pummeling, Falling and Getting Up-Sometimes (1979)
- Track, Enduro and Motocross (1979)
- Canoeing, Kayaking, and Rafting (1979)
- Going Very Fast in a Circle (1979)
- Athletics: Focus On Sport (1980)
- Ice Hockey: Focus On Sport (1980)
- Motor Cycling: Focus On Sport (1980)
- Motor Racing: Focus On Sport (1980)
- Skiing: Focus On Sport (1980)
- Tennis: Focus On Sport (1980)
- T.V. and Movie Animals (1980) (with Art Browne, Jr)
- Money Saving Home Repair Guide: Successful Home Improvement Series (1981)
- Sailing: From Jibs to Jibing (1981)
- Beat the System: A Survival Guide (1982)
- The Madonna Stories (1988)
- Woodsong (1990)
- Eastern Sun, Winter Moon (1993)
- Full of Hot Air: Launching, Floating High, And Landing (1993)
- A Guide for Using Hatchet in the Classroom (1994)
- Winterdance: The Fine Madness of Running the Iditarod (1994)
- Father Water, Mother Woods (1994)
- Puppies, Dogs, and Blue Northers (1996)
- My Life in Dog Years (1998)
- Pilgrimage on a Steel Ride: A Memoir of Men and Motorcycles (1997)
- All Aboard: Stories from Big Books (1998)
- Zero to Sixty: A Motorcycle Journey Through Midlife (1999)
- Guts: The True Stories Behind Hatchet and the Brian Books (2001)
- Caught by the Sea: My Life on Boats (2001)
- How Angel Peterson Got His Name (2003)
- This Side of Wild: Mutts, Mares, and Laughing Dinosaurs (2015)
- Gone to the Woods: Surviving a Lost Childhood: A True Story of Growing Up in the Wild (2021)
