= Dirty Bird =

Dirty Bird or Dirty Birds may refer to:

- A nickname for Wild Turkey (bourbon)
- Sister Sparrow & the Dirty Birds, a New York-based seven-piece soul/rock band
  - Sister Sparrow & the Dirty Birds (album), a 2010 album by the band
- Dirty Bird (football dance), a celebratory dance popularized by Jamal Anderson of the Atlanta Falcons
- Atlanta Falcons, a nickname the team earned during the 1998 NFL season due to the dance of the same name
- "Dirty Bird", a 2010 song by Brant Bjork from the album Gods & Goddesses
- Charleston Dirty Birds, an American professional baseball team
- Dirty Bird, a Toronto, Canada hardcore band established in 1992
- "Dirty Bird", a viral song from the American adult animated series Helluva Boss that got created and also became a meme trend in 2026.

== See also ==
- The Case of the Dirty Bird, a 1992 children's book
- Columbidae, the genus including pigeons
