= Tent (disambiguation) =

A tent is a shelter made of fabric or similar material.

Tent or The Tent may also refer to:

== Arts, entertainment, and media ==
- Tent (album), a 1979 album by The Nits
- The Tent (Atwood book), a 2006 book by Margaret Atwood
- The Tent (Paulsen novel), a 1995 Gary Paulsen book
- The Tent (film), a 2020 American thriller film
- The Tent, a 2008 film produced and directed by Hakan Haslaman
- "Tent" (Not Going Out), a 2022 television episode
- Everyone I Have Ever Slept With 1963–1995 or The Tent, artwork by Tracey Emin

== Surname ==
- Katrin Tent (born 1963), German mathematician
- Kevin Tent, American film editor
- M. B. W. Tent, American mathematical biographer

== Places ==
- Tent Island, an island in McMurdo Sound, Antarctica
- Tent Mountain, a mountain straddling the border of the Canadian provinces of British Columbia and Alberta
- Tent Nunatak, a nunatak in Graham Land, Antarctica
- Tent Peak, a mountain in Ross Island, Antarctica
- Tent Rock, a nunatak in Oates Land, Antarctica
- The Tent, South Africa, see List of mountains in South Africa

== Other uses ==
- TeNT, the tetanus neurotoxin Tetanospasmin
- TEN-T, Trans-European Transport Networks, a planned set of road, rail, air and water transport networks in Europe
- TPP Nikola Tesla, commonly known as TENT, a power plant complex in Serbia

== See also ==
- Tente (disambiguation)
