= Rifle (disambiguation) =

A rifle is a firearm with a stock and a barrel that has a spiral groove or grooves ("rifling") cut into its interior.

Rifle or The Rifle(s) may also refer to:

== Military ==
- The Rifles, a regiment of the British Army
- Rifle regiment, British light infantry armed with rifles
- Rifle regiment, a type of Russian and Soviet unit of the rifle troops type

== Entertainment ==
- The Rifle, a 1995 novel by American writer Gary Paulsen
- The Rifles (band), an English rock band
- "Rifles", a song by Black Rebel Motorcycle Club on the album B.R.M.C.
- "The Rifle", a second-season episode of Peter Gunn, 1959
- "The Rifle", an episode of The Rough Riders, 1959
- "The Rifle (Dynasty)", a season 8 episode of Dynasty, 1988

== Other uses ==
- Rifle, Colorado, a city in Garfield County, Colorado, USA
- Rifle (fashion), an Italian clothing company
- Walter Pandiani (born 1976), Uruguayan footballer
- RIFLE criteria, a classification system for acute renal failure
- The Rifle, a shooting sports magazine and predecessor of American Rifleman

== See also ==
- Riffle (disambiguation)
- Rifling, the process of grooving a gun barrel to increase a projectile's range and accuracy
- Rifleman (disambiguation), a private soldier in a rifle unit of infantry
