= Frauke Roenneke =

German footballer (born 1998)

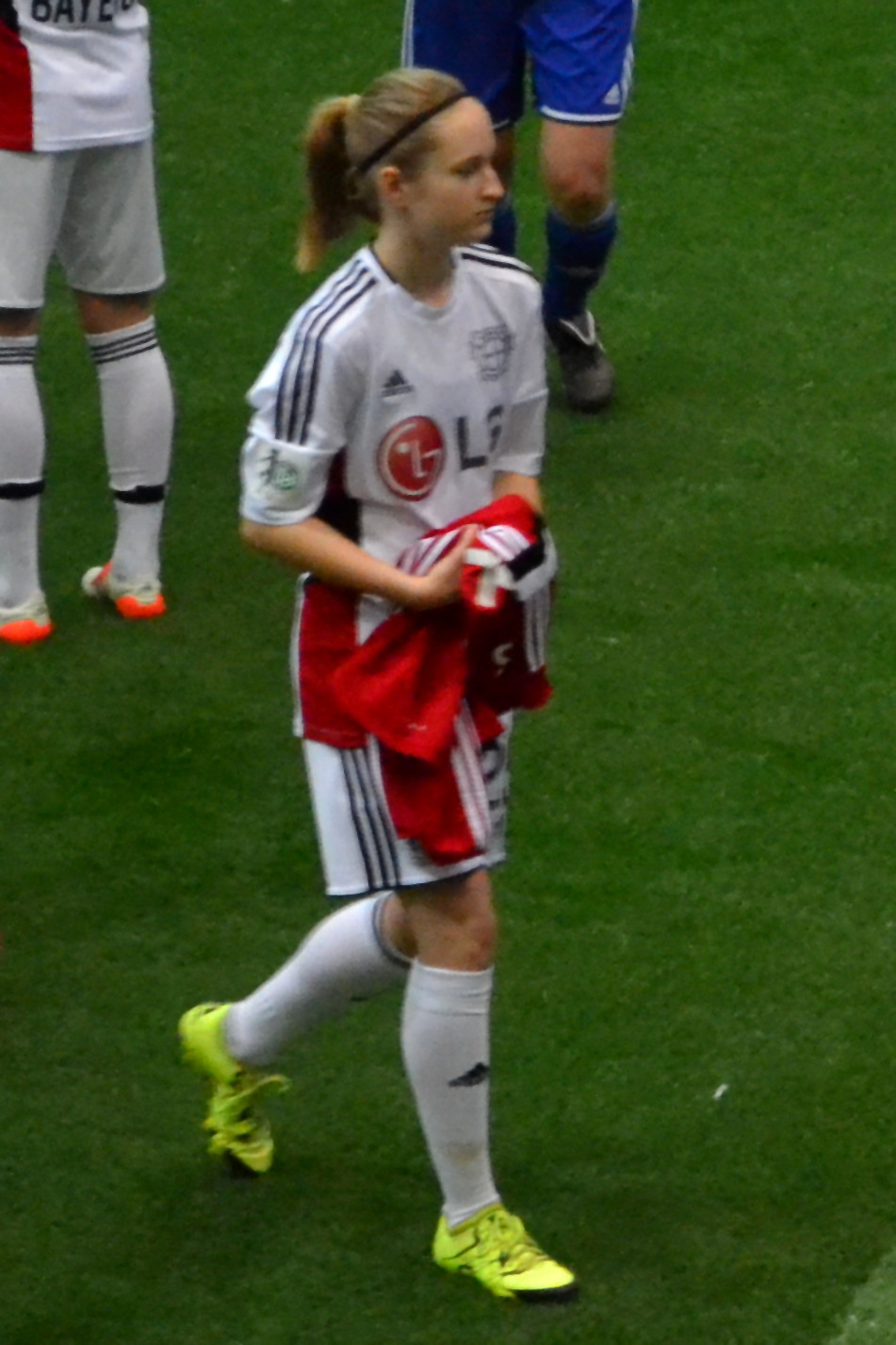

Personal information
- Date of birth: 26 January 1999 (age 27)
- Place of birth: Wermelskirchen, Germany
- Position: Defender

Frauke Roenneke (born 26 January 1998) is a German footballer who plays as a midfielder for Bayer 04 Leverkusen.
