= Tente =

Tente may refer to:

- Tente International, a manufacturer of industrial casters and wheels
- Tente (toy), a line of construction toys similar to Lego
- Tente Sánchez (born 1956), Spanish former footballer

== See also ==
- Tent (disambiguation)
