= Culpepper's Cannon =

1992 novel by Gary Paulsen

- Culpepper's Cannon first edition cover.
- Author: Gary Paulsen
- Language: English
- Series: Culpepper Adventures
- Publisher: Dell Publishing
- Publication date: July 1, 1992
- Publication place: United States
- Media type: Print (paperback)
- ISBN: 0-440-40617-X
- OCLC: 26297423
- Preceded by: Dunc's Doll
- Followed by: Dunc Gets Tweaked

Culpepper's Cannon is the third novel in the Culpepper Adventures series by Gary Paulsen. It is about Dunc Culpepper and Amos who are researching the Civil War cannon in the town square, until they uncover a hidden note inside the cannon which tells about a time portal. It was published in 1992, by Dell Publishing.
