= Brian's Return =

Book by Gary Paulsen

Brian's Return (Hatchet: The Call)
- First edition
- Author: Gary Paulsen
- Language: English
- Series: Brian's Saga
- Genre: Young Adult
- Publisher: Delacorte Press
- Publication date: February 1999
- Publication place: United States
- Media type: Print (hardback & paperback)
- Pages: 128 pp (first edition, hardback)
- ISBN: 0-385-32500-2 (first edition, hardback)
- LC Class: PZ7.P2843 Bp 1999
- Preceded by: Brian's Winter
- Followed by: Brian's Hunt

Brian's Return is a 1999 wilderness survival novel by American writer Gary Paulsen. It is the fourth in the Hatchet series.

It was also released as Hatchet: The Call by Macmillan Children's Books in the UK on January 8, 1999. This was originally supposed to be the final Hatchet book in the series, but due to hundreds of requests from readers, Paulsen, in response, published Brian's Hunt in 2003 as a follow-up.

== Plot ==
Brian struggles to fit into urban society and is sent to see a psychologist, a blind ex-police officer named Caleb. Caleb recognizes that Brian's home is the wilderness. Brian returns to the Canadian wilderness at Caleb's suggestion, knowing that it is where his heart truly belongs.

== Receptions ==
Brian's Return was well received by critics, including a starred review from Publishers Weekly, who referred to the novel as "bold, confident and persuasive".

Kirkus Reviews noted that "readers hoping for the high adventure of the previous books may be disappointed, as Brian is now so skilled that a tipped canoe or a wild storm are only inconveniences." However, they concluded that the wilderness is "vividly observed".

The American Library Association named Brian's Return among their list of Quick Picks for Reluctant Young Adult Readers.
