= Blakely Bantam =

Bantam

Overview
- Manufacturer: Blakely Auto Works
- Also called: Hawk
- Production: 1970s, 1980s
- Designer: Dick Blakely

Body and chassis
- Class: Sports car
- Body style: Roadster
- Layout: Front-mid engine, rear drive

Powertrain
- Engine: Various, including: Ford 1600 cc. 4-cyl. Ford 2000 cc. 4-cyl. Ford 2300 cc. 4-cyl. Mazda rotary
- Transmission: 4-speed manual 3-speed automatic

Dimensions
- Wheelbase: 2,286 mm (90.0 in)
- Length: 3,302 mm (130.0 in)
- Width: 1,549 mm (61.0 in)
- Height: 1,092 mm (43.0 in)
- Curb weight: 680.4 kg (1,500.0 lb)

The Blakely Bantam was a kit car produced by Blakely Auto Works (also called Bernardi Auto Works in later years), a manufacturer of kit cars located in a series of US midwest communities in the 1970s and 1980s. Blakely Auto was founded by Dick Blakely to market affordable sports cars in the spirit of the legendary Lotus Seven: compact, lightweight, and with excellent handling. The Bantam's design inspiration was the Dutton, a Lotus Seven replica built in Britain. The Bantam was introduced in 1972 as Blakely's first offering, followed by the larger Bearcat and eventually by the Bernardi. Production of the Bantam continued into the 1980s, when the model was renamed the Hawk, and stopped with the dissolution of Bernardi Auto Works in the later 1980s.

== Design and construction ==
The Bantam was a compact, two-seater design with a front-mid-engine placement and rear-wheel drive. The car had fixed-position seats, flat windshield, outboard front fenders, and headlights on stalks. The hood comprised a top and sides protecting the engine, and was hinged at the front for easy access to the engine area. Behind the cab, a full-width roll-hoop had four points of connection to the chassis.

The design was also notable for what it lacked: roof, doors, and trunk, among other conventional features. Dispensing with these items kept the body simple and rigid, and most importantly kept car weight to a minimum. Blakely stated that the Bantam weighed 680 kg (1500 pounds), more than the Lotus Seven's 500 kg but significantly less than most sports cars of the time. Assembly time for the simple kit was estimated by the factory at 100–200 hours for a novice builder.

For suspension, engine, transmission, and electrical components, the Bantam's preferred donor car was the 1971–1980 Ford Pinto. Builders could also use parts from close relatives like the 1971–1980 Mercury Bobcat and the 1974–1978 Ford Mustang II. This family of donor vehicles gave the Bantam rack-and-pinion steering, A-arm independent front suspension, front disk brakes, and a good selection of engine choices. The car's small frame suited small engines. Factory-recommended options in the donor family included Ford's 1.6 liter, 2 liter, or 2.3 liter 4-cylinder Pinto / Bobcat engines. The Mazda rotary engine was another choice.

The Lotus Seven and Dutton replica designs that inspired the Bantam were built using a space frame. Blakely chose a somewhat simpler design using 14-gauge metal tubing with some boxing-in around the engine compartment. This frame was more three-dimensional than the frame used on the company's larger Bearcat and Bernardi models, and presumably stiffer. It did not, however, have sheet metal fixed directly to frame members, a stiffening approach used around the transmission tunnel and passenger area in some designs similar to the Lotus Seven. Instead, a separate fiberglass body was mounted on the pre-fabricated chassis, bolting into place at several points. The Pinto donor's lower front A-arms were used in the front suspension, with factory-supplied upper A-arms. The rear suspension was built by cutting the donor's leaf springs in half, and mounting one left half and one right half behind the cab to suspend and locate the solid rear axle.

Contemporary reports praised the Bantam's performance and handling, as well as the fit and finish of the kit car components. Despite these accolades, few Bantams (and indeed few Lotus replicas of any type) were sold in the US in the 1970s and 1980s. Larger, heavier V8-powered sports cars, like the numerous AC Cobra replicas, were more popular, as were kits built on the popular Volkswagen chassis.
