= Call Me Francis Tucket =

1995 novel by Gary Paulsen

- First edition cover
- Author: Gary Paulsen
- Language: English
- Series: The Tucket Adventures
- Genre: Western novel
- Publisher: Random House
- Publication date: 1995
- Publication place: United States
- Media type: Print (hardback & paperback)
- Preceded by: Mr. Tucket
- Followed by: Tucket's Ride

Call Me Francis Tucket is the second novel in The Tucket Adventures by American author Gary Paulsen. It was published in 1995 by Random House.

In the novel, protagonist Francis Tucket is 15 and determined to return to civilization. Only a year before, he was heading west by wagon train with his family, captured by the Pawnees and rescued by a savvy, one-armed mountain man.

It was later turned into a five-part omnibus, entitled Tucket's Travels, along with the rest of the novels in The Tucket Adventures by Random House and released in 2003.
