= Brian's Hunt =

Book by Gary Paulsen

- Author: Gary Paulsen
- Language: English
- Series: Brian's Saga
- Genre: Novel
- Publisher: Random House
- Publication date: 2003
- Publication place: United States
- Media type: Hardcover and paperback
- Pages: 182 pp
- ISBN: 978-0307929594
- Preceded by: Brian's Return

Brian's Hunt is a 2003 young adult novel by Gary Paulsen. It is the fifth and final book in the award-winning Hatchet series, which deals with Brian Robeson, a boy who learns wilderness survival when he is stranded after a plane wreck.

== Plot summary ==
Brian, who is now 16 years old, is canoeing through the Canadian wilderness. He realizes that the woods are now his home and he will never be happy in modern society with its noise, pollution, and inauthentic people. He now spends his time in the wild, hunting, fishing, and home schooling himself. While Brian does not miss human contact, he finds his thoughts frequently turning to Kay-gwa-daush (also known as Susan), the eldest daughter of the Cree family who rescued him at the end of Brian's Winter. Though he has only seen her photograph, her family has described her as an adventurous, self-reliant young woman, and Brian wonders if she might be a kindred spirit.

While canoeing, Brian finds a severely injured Malamute dog, which he nurses back to health. The dog is domesticated, and Brian begins to worry that whatever maimed the dog may have done the same to her owners. He remembers his Cree friends, the Smallhorns, and decides to go check on them.

When Brian reaches their cabin, he finds that a bear has killed the parents and chased Susan into hiding. Brian returns her to her home and buries the family while she radios for help. The authorities arrive to take Susan to relatives in Winnipeg. Brian, along with the dog, stays behind to hunt down and kill the bear, knowing very well that the hunt could cost him his life.

Brian uses skills he has learned (explained in past books Hatchet, Brian's Return, and Brian's Winter) to search for the bear that killed his friends. He finds bear tracks on an island and begins to follow them. He later realizes that he is walking in a circle. Soon, the hunter becomes the hunted. The bear is following Brian. The next day, instead of moving on, he waits for the bear. After a hard-fought battle with the bear, Brian is triumphant.
