= Fight (EP) =

EP by Sister Sparrow & the Dirty Birds
- Released: October 1, 2013
- Genre: Rock, soul, funk
- Length: 15:57
- Label: Modern Vintage Recordings
- Producer: Randy Jackson

Sister Sparrow & the Dirty Birds chronology
Pound of Dirt (2012)	Fight (2013)	The Weather Below (2015)

Fight is Sister Sparrow & the Dirty Birds's first and so far their only EP, released on October 1, 2013, on Modern Vintage Recordings. The album was produced by former American Idol judge Randy Jackson.

== Track list ==
All tracks are written by Arleigh Kincheloe

No.	Title	Length
1.	"The Long Way"	3:35
2.	"Fight"	4:09
3.	"Boogie Man"	3:53
4.	"Crawdaddies"	4:20
