= My Life in Dog Years =

1997 book by Gary Paulsen

- My Life in Dog Years first edition cover.
- Author: Gary Paulsen
- Cover artist: C. E. Mitchell (photo)
- Language: English
- Subject: Dogs
- Genre: Children's
- Publisher: Delacorte Books
- Publication date: January 12, 1997
- Publication place: United States
- Media type: Print (Hardback & Paperback)
- Pages: 144 pp (first edition)
- ISBN: 978-0-385-32570-7
- OCLC: 37666415
- Dewey Decimal: 813/.54 B 21
- LC Class: PS3566.A834 Z47 1998

My Life in Dog Years is a non-fiction book for children written by American author Gary Paulsen, together with his wife, Ruth Wright Paulsen. It was published first by Delacorte Press in 1997.

The book contains a chapter about each different dog in his life. As he goes through each chapter, he delves into the personality of each dog as companions and not just animals.

== Summary ==
My Life in Dog Years begins with Cookie, a dog which rescued him from a fall through the ice while dog sled racing. Next he talks about Snowball, a dog he owned in the Philippines at age 7 (his first) who was killed in a military truck accident. It then discusses Ike, dog that became attached to him during a hunting trip. Ike continues to accompany him for about a year, but then disappears. Paulsen later discovers that Ike's owner had to leave him when he went to the war. When he returned with an injury, Ike returned to him.

Dirk, next, is a dog that Paulsen adopted during his adolescence, and served as a protector during a difficult period. While working on a farm, he met Rex, a rough collie, whom he considered one of the smartest dogs he ever knew after observing his activities for a day. He later adopted an exceptionally large Great Dane, Caesar (pronounced See-Zer) who was easily excited, but a gentle giant that loved hot dogs.

Paulsen later became a dog sled racer. At one point, he traded one of his best dogs for Quincy, who was later to save his wife from a bear despite being only nine inches tall. The last chapter is about his current dog at the time, Josh. It is clear that Josh is one of the author's favorite dogs, as he has the most to write about him. At the time the book was written, Josh was about 20 years old. Josh was known as the smartest dog in the world.

== Reception ==
My Life in Dog Years was well received by critics, including starred reviews from Booklist and Publishers Weekly. Publishers Weekly highlighted the "deceptively casual prose" through which "Paulsen writes of his own troubles matter-of- factly while wittily and affectionately enumerating his dogs' virtues". Similarly, Kirkus Reviews found that the "thoughtful, ironic, [and] often hilarious [...] vivid character portraits not only make winning stories, but convey a deep respect for all dogs".

Booklist named My Life in Dog Years one of the best books for older readers in 1998.
