= The Glass Cafe =

2003 novella by Gary Paulsen

- The Glass Cafe first edition cover.
- Author: Gary Paulsen
- Cover artist: Brian Dugan
- Language: English
- Genre: Young adult fiction
- Publisher: Wendy Lamb Books
- Publication date: June 10, 2003
- Publication place: United States
- Media type: Print (Hardback & Paperback)
- Pages: 112 pp (first edition)
- ISBN: 0-385-32499-5
- OCLC: 50583384
- LC Class: PZ7.P2843 Gl 2003

The Glass Cafe Or the Stripper and the State; How My Mother Started a War with the System That Made Us Kind of Rich and a Little Bit Famous is a young adult fiction novella by American author Gary Paulsen, published June 10, 2003 by Wendy Lamb Books. It is about a 12-year-old boy whose mother is a stripper.

== Plot introduction ==
Tony is fascinated with art, and goes to the club that his mom works at to draw pictures of some of the ladies. When his art teacher looks at the drawings, she wants to put them up in a museum for a contest. When people look at the pictures of the ladies, Tony's mom gets in trouble and is sent to court for letting her son draw pornographic pictures. Tony's mom explains that it was just art, and tells them the story of the Glass Cafe.

== Publication history ==
- 2003, USA, Wendy Lamb Books ISBN 0-385-32499-5, Pub date June 10, 2003, Hardback
- 2004, USA, Laurel Leaf, ISBN 0-440-23843-9, Pub date November 9, 2004, Paperback

== Reception ==
The Glass Cafe was received favorably by critics. Kirkus Reviews found it "not too likely, but all good fun", though noted that "Paulsen claims that Al is based on an actual acquaintance". They recommended the novel to "reluctant readers, Paulsen fans, or anyone who enjoys an occasional belly laugh to this prototypical preteen and his most memorable mom."

Publishers Weekly referred to the novel as "a righteous, pro–free-speech theme accompanied by big helpings of over-the-top plot lines." Discussing the novel's style, they added, "Paulsen looks to the endless run-on sentences and artless grammar of Tony's delivery for humor", concluding " readers who like this style of writing can rest easy: Paulsen maintains that style all the way to the end."
