= Fowl Play (album) =

Live album by Sister Sparrow & the Dirty Birds
- Released: March 4, 2016
- Genre: Rock, alternative
- Length: 1:44:05
- Label: Party Fowl Records, Thirty Tigers

Sister Sparrow & the Dirty Birds chronology
The Weather Below (2015)	Fowl Play (2016)	Gold (2018)

Fowl Play is Sister Sparrow & the Dirty Birds' first and so far their only live album, released on March 4, 2016 on Party Fowl Records, Thirty Tigers. The album was recorded on New Year's Eve, 2015, although not in the originally planned venue, Daryl's House in New York (Daryl Hall's concert venue). Just a month in advance of their concert, Daryl decided to play that night at his joint, and the Dirty Bird's concert was canceled, and the band had to scramble to find another hall to play in for their planned recorded concert. They managed to land on their feet at the Warehouse at the Fairfield Theatre Co. in Connecticut and still sold out in advance.

== Track list ==
- All tracks written by Arleigh Kincheloe, except where noted

Disc One

No.	Title	Writer(s)	Length
1.	"Freight Train"		4:08
2.	"We Need a Love"		4:47
3.	"Catch Me If You Can"	A. Kincheloe, S. Brown	6:10
4.	"Frankie"		6:20
5.	"Don't Be Jealous"	A. Kincheloe, S. Brown	4:50
6.	"My House"		7:01
7.	"Borderline"	A. Kincheloe, Jackson Kincheloe, Bram Kincheloe, Sasha Brown, Josh Myers, Brian D. Graham, Phil Rodriguez, Ryan Snow	4:33
Total length:			37:49

Disc Two

No.	Title	Writer(s)	Length
1.	"Dirt"	A. Kincheloe, Jackson Kincheloe, Sasha Brown, Aidan Carroll	4:31
2.	"Millie Mae"		6:04
3.	"Prison Cells"		9:56
4.	"Dr. Feelgood"	Aretha Franklin, Ted White	8:50
5.	"Sugar"		5:19
6.	"Crawdaddies"		5:14
7.	"Who Are You?"	A. Kincheloe, J. Kincheloe	7:05
8.	"Mama Knows"		10:16
9.	"Roadtrip"	A. Kincheloe, J. Kincheloe	9:01
Total length:			1:06:16
