= Alida's Song =

1999 novel by Gary Paulsen

- Author: Gary Paulsen
- Language: English
- Series: Alida's series
- Publisher: Dell Publishing
- Publication date: June 8, 1999
- Publication place: United States
- Media type: Print (hardback)
- Pages: 96 pp
- ISBN: 0-385-32586-X
- OCLC: 39695859
- LC Class: PZ7.P2843 Ag 1999
- Preceded by: The Cookcamp
- Followed by: The Quilt

Alida's Song is a young adult novel by American author Gary Paulsen, published June 8, 1999, by Delacorte Books. It is the sequel to The Cookcamp, published in 1991. The audiobook is narrated by Luke Daniels.

The story is about "the boy" who receives a letter from his grandmother offering him a job as a farm hand on the farm where she cooks.
