= Blakely Bernardi =

Bernardi
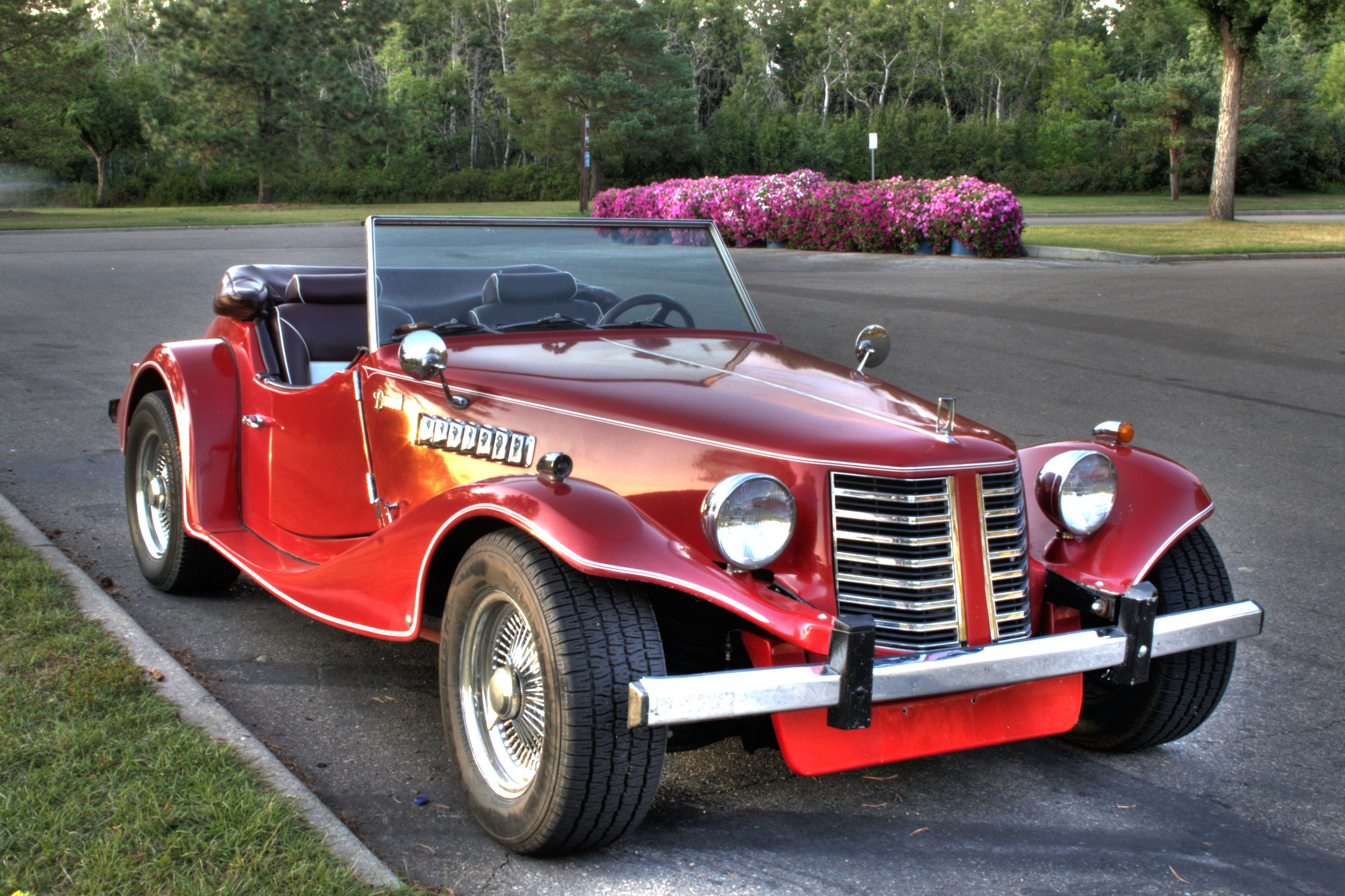

Overview
- Manufacturer: Blakely Auto Works
- Production: Unknown

Body and chassis
- Body style: Roadster
- Layout: Front-mid engine, rear drive

Powertrain
- Engine: Various, including: Ford 1600 cc. 4-cyl. Ford 2000 cc. 4-cyl. Ford 2300 cc. 4-cyl. Ford / GM 2800 cc. V6; Ford small-block V8
- Transmission: 4-speed manual 3-speed automatic

Dimensions
- Wheelbase: 2,388 mm (94.0 in)
- Length: 3,683 mm (145.0 in)
- Width: 1,727 mm (68.0 in)
- Height: 1,245 mm (49.0 in)
- Curb weight: Various, starting at 817 kg (1,801.2 lb)

The Blakely Bernardi is an automobile produced in the 1980s by Blakely Auto Works (also called Bernardi Auto Works in some references) of Princeton, Wisconsin, USA. Blakely produced a number of automobile models, including the Bearcat and Bantam. This model is named after Enrico Bernardi, Italian inventor of the gasoline internal-combustion engine and automobile pioneer. The Bernardi was available as a completed car or as a kit of parts to be assembled by the buyer.

== Design and construction ==
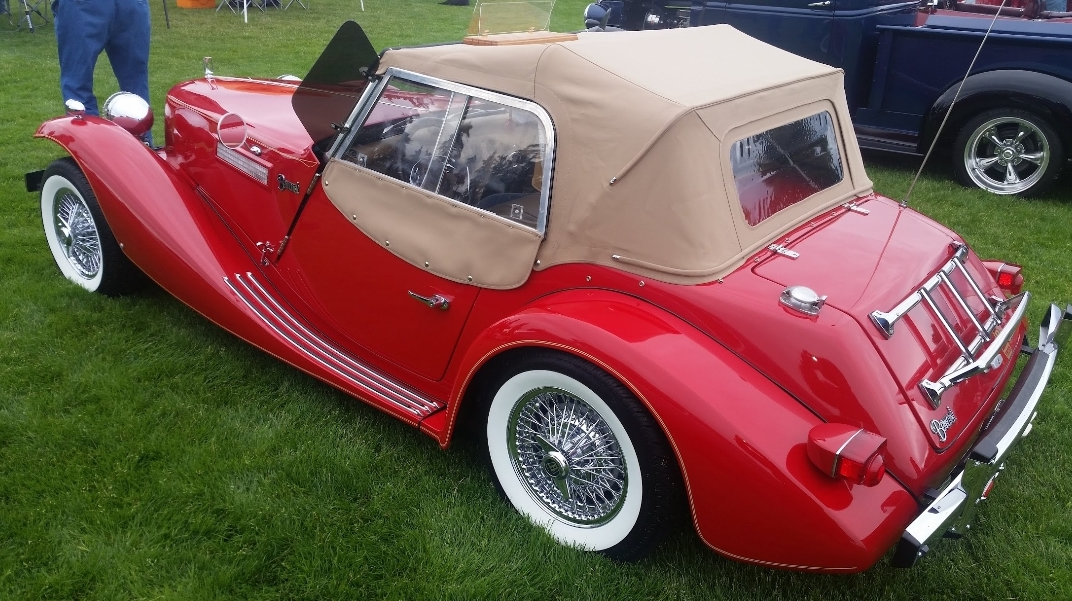
1980 Blakely Bernardi Top Up

The Bernardi is a neo-classic design reminiscent of the 1950s British MG TD. The chassis is front-engine, rear-wheel drive with the engine located behind the front axle. It has a two-seat cab under a removable hardtop or convertible fabric top, flat windshield, three windshield wipers (like the MGB Mark II), working doors, and detachable side curtains of fiberglass and plexiglass.

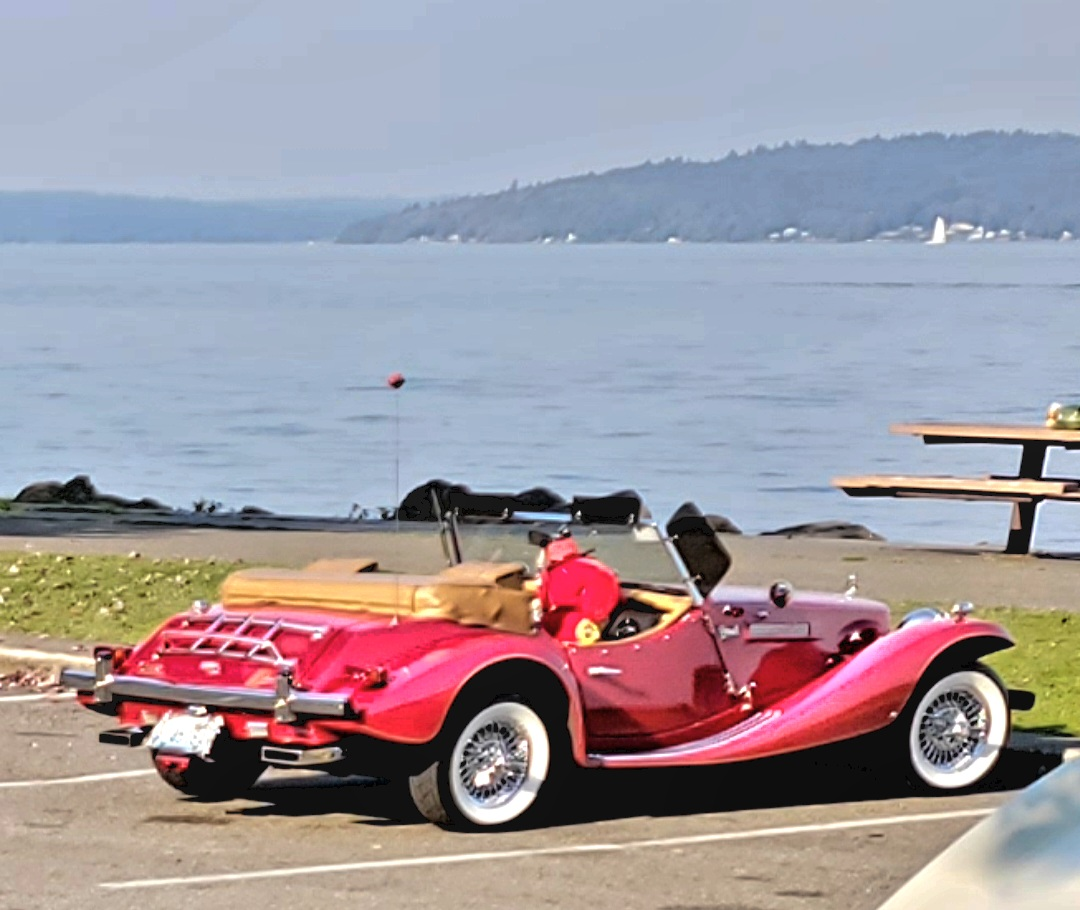
1980 Blakely Bernardi

In keeping with the traditional look of post-WWII British sports cars, the Bernardi's front fenders stand away from the body, and the headlights perch on stalks between the fenders and the hood. There is a functional, though fairly small, trunk in the back and a trunk-mounted external luggage rack. A small bench behind the seats was available as a factory option, with enough room to store small packages or accommodate a stereo system. Cars without the bench are equipped with a two-point chromed roll bar behind the cab, which fits beneath the convertible roof. While the body style and proportions generally mimic the MG-TD, the Bernardi is noticeably larger in body width and has sufficient room under the hood easily to accommodate an American small-block V8 engine.

An overview of the build process for a Bernardi Blakely appeared in Kit Car World and gave significant detail about the Bernardi's general structure and some of its construction options. The basic construction is a Body-on-frame design with a fiberglass body mounted on a pre-fabricated metal chassis. The factory-provided chassis is a custom ladder frame built of 2-inch (51 mm) by 3-inch (76 mm) rectangular steel tubing with a 5/16th inch wall thickness. The factory attached fuel and brake plumbing, as well the tail-light wiring bundle, to the frame before shipping.

The mechanical components, including engine, suspension, and transmission, could be drawn from the Ford Pinto, Mercury Bobcat, or Ford Mustang II. Based on these donor choices, the suspension is relatively unsophisticated, with a solid rear axle mounted on quarter-elliptical leaf springs. The donor leaf springs are cut approximately in half, with just one of the halves on each side of the differential making up the rear springing. The rear axle is actually mounted above the side rails of the frame, which keeps the frame design simple but limits the axle's vertical range of movement. The front suspension is a somewhat sportier double-wishbone design, built from the donor car's lower A-arm and a custom upper A-arm, with coil-over shocks and the donor's disk brakes.

The car's body was built at the factory and featured an unusual form of fiberglass construction. Instead of a single layer of fiberglass, as is common in other kit cars, the Bernardi body tub (the portion between the passenger compartment and the frame or road) and other body components used a composite sandwich consisting of one layer of fiberglass, one of stiff plastic foam, and finally a second layer of fiberglass. The result is a heavier body than usual for kit cars, but one with reputedly greater stiffness and sound absorption than the single-layer approach. The colors for the visible parts of the body are molded into the fiberglass body parts as Gelcoat and the cars often appear with two-tone color schemes where the body color contrasts with the fenders and running boards.

The factory attached the body's doors, windshield, hood, and trunk lid before shipping the kit to the buyer. Major mounting points between the body and the chassis were also pre-drilled at the factory with the body placed on the chassis, so that these items would line up properly when the buyer began assembling the vehicle. The Bernardi's complete hood tilts forward for easy access to the engine area, and is trimmed at the front with chrome-work from the Oldsmobile Cutlass.

The vehicle's interior upholstery was provided, in the form of pre-cut carpet, door trim, seat covers, a tonneau cover, and dash upholstery. When completed, the Bernardi interior is similar to a commercial automobile's, with upholstery or trim for all interior fiberglass panels. The dash is finished with vinyl fabric, and contains the speedometer, tachometer, and several engine gauges in the center console. The doors are also fabric-trimmed, with elastic-topped map pouches on both sides. Vents are installed in the dash to direct heated air to the windshield and to passenger seating positions. Despite these advanced features, contemporary reports suggest that the buyer's assembly time for the Bernardi was expected to be a relatively low 100 to 120 hours.

The car has options for several types of engine. The smallest recommended powerplants included the 1.6 liter, 2 liter, or 2.3 liter 4-cylinder Ford Pinto / Bobcat engines used by the smaller Blakely Bantam. The Bernardi chassis is also amenable to larger engines like a 2.8 liter Ford or Chevrolet / Pontiac V6, and even the small-block Ford V8. All engine types mount behind the front axle, making the chassis a front-mid-engine design with the attendant benefits in front-rear weight balance and low polar moment of inertia. Although the Bernardi was marketed as comfortable touring car, the car's combination of chassis layout, low weight, and V8 engine option resemble aggressive sports designs like the AC Cobra.

== Current status ==
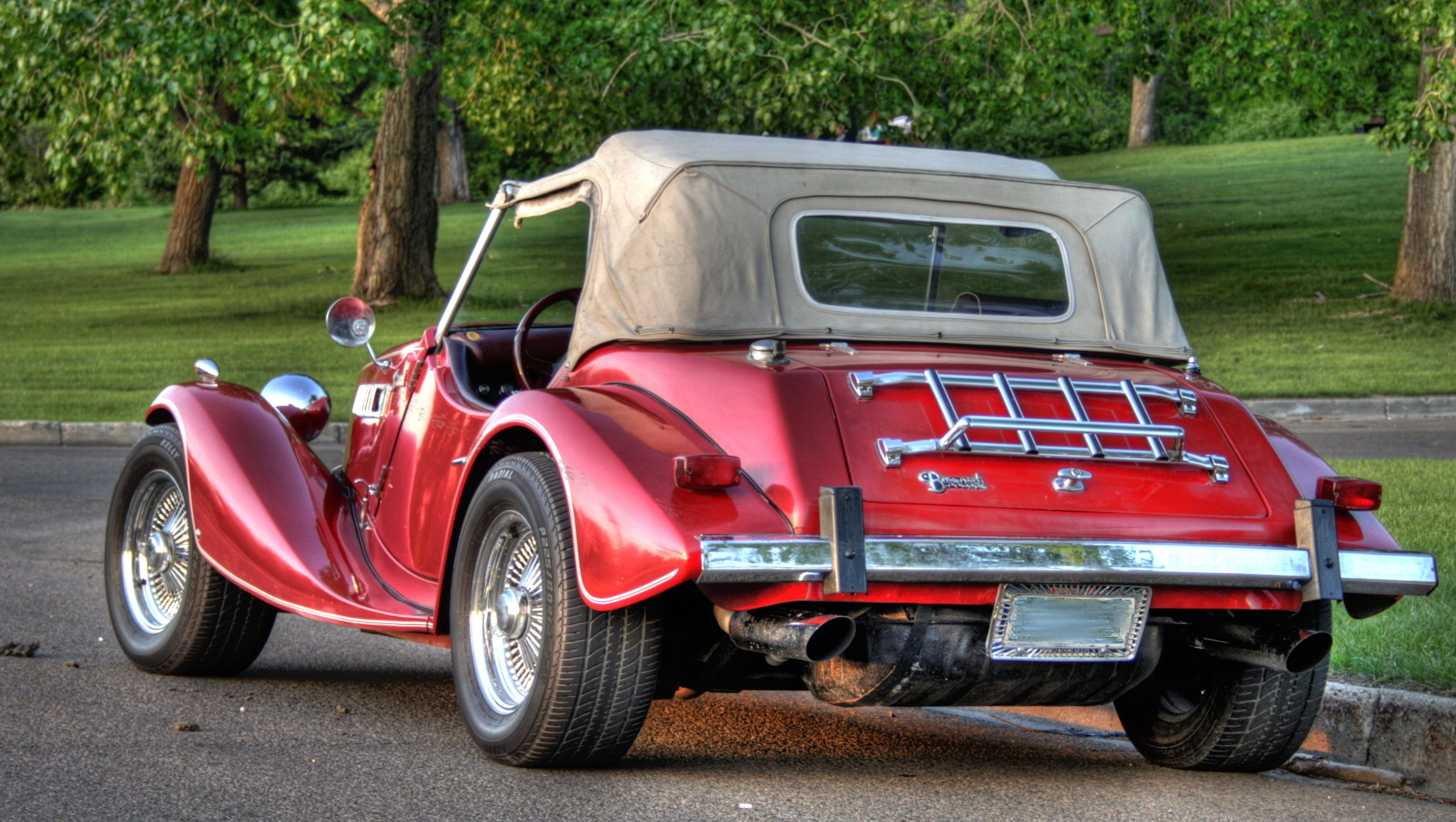
1988 Blakely Bernardi

The Blakely Bernardi was expensive for its time and marketplace. The company's 1984 price list listed the full set of kit parts at $US 8,495. To complete the car, the buyer would have to provide a donor car and optionally an additional engine. Blakely also offered a completed turnkey car for $US 19,900 to $US 22,900 depending on the engine choice. In 1984, driving a base-model Chevrolet Corvette off the dealer's lot cost around $US 22,000 and delivered a sportier suspension, better interior comfort, and a standard V8 engine.

A kit car's value lies not just in the cost of the car or its components, so a comparison with the Corvette's cost may not be fair. The Bernardi competed more directly against other neo-classic sports-car kits. Although the Bernardi offered superior body quality and the authentic front-engine design of the sports cars it resembled, its body and chassis were more complicated and costly than those of kits based on the Volkswagen Beetle, like the Fiberfab Migi MG-TD replica. These VW-based kits are much more common across the United States. Blakely Bernardis, although regularly appearing for sale at specialty dealers, do not have the contemporary high visibility of many other kit models.

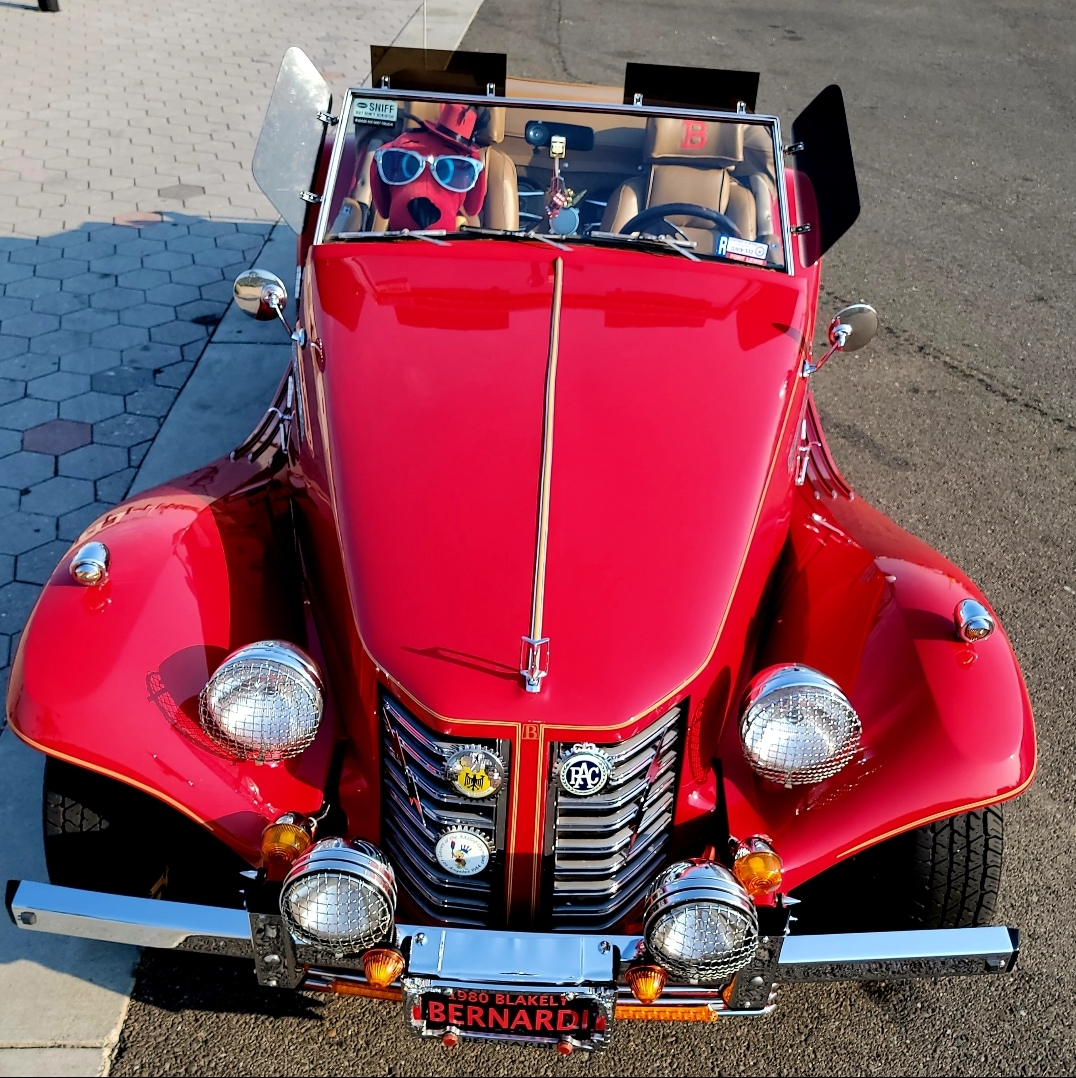
Front down view of 1980 Bernardi

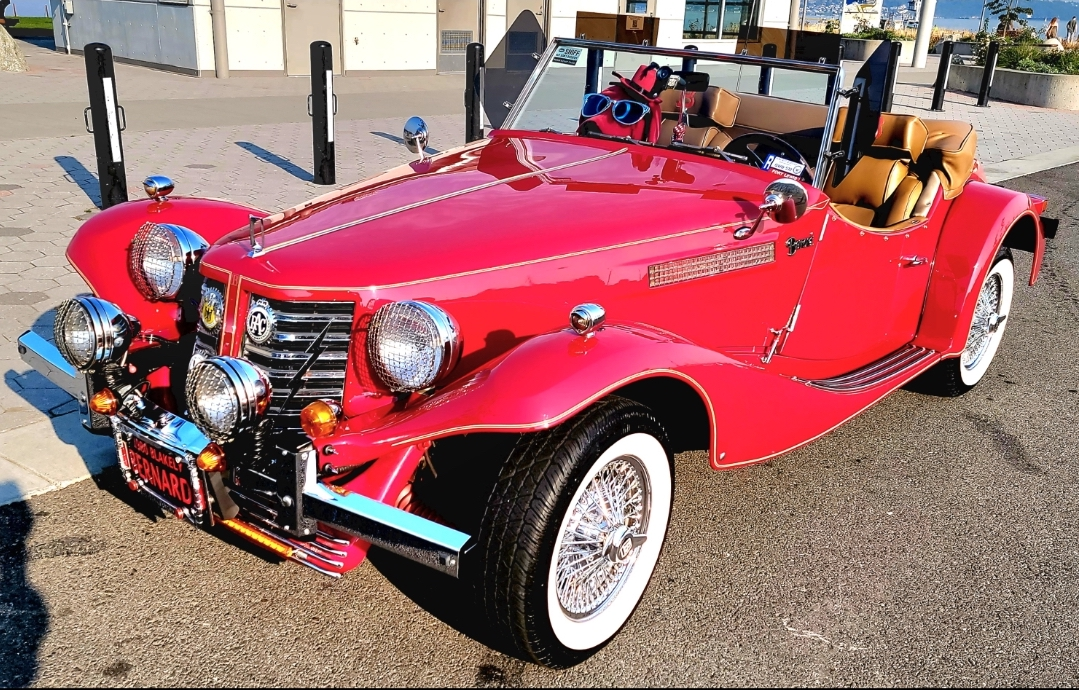
1980 Bernardi

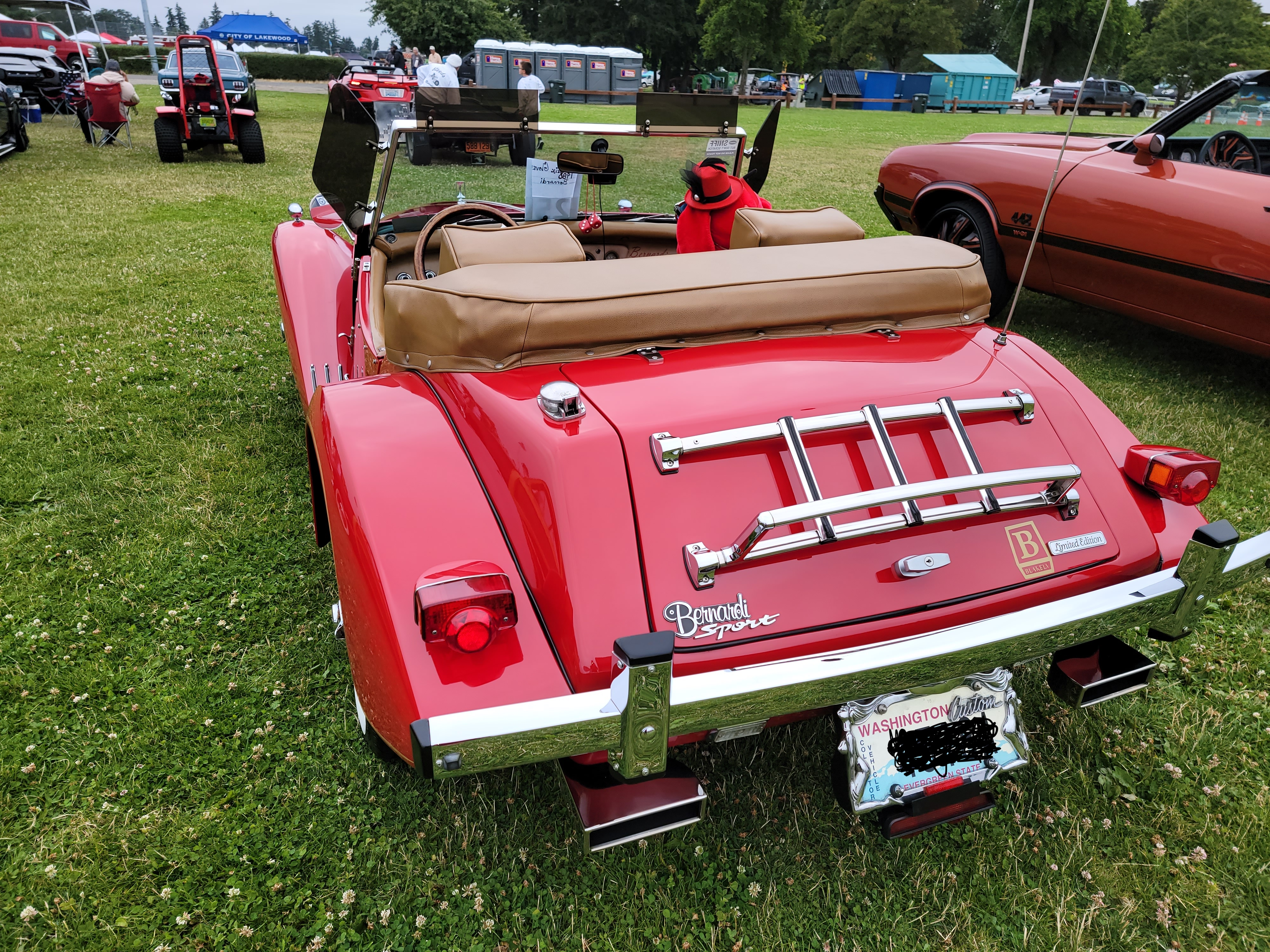
1980 Benardi rear

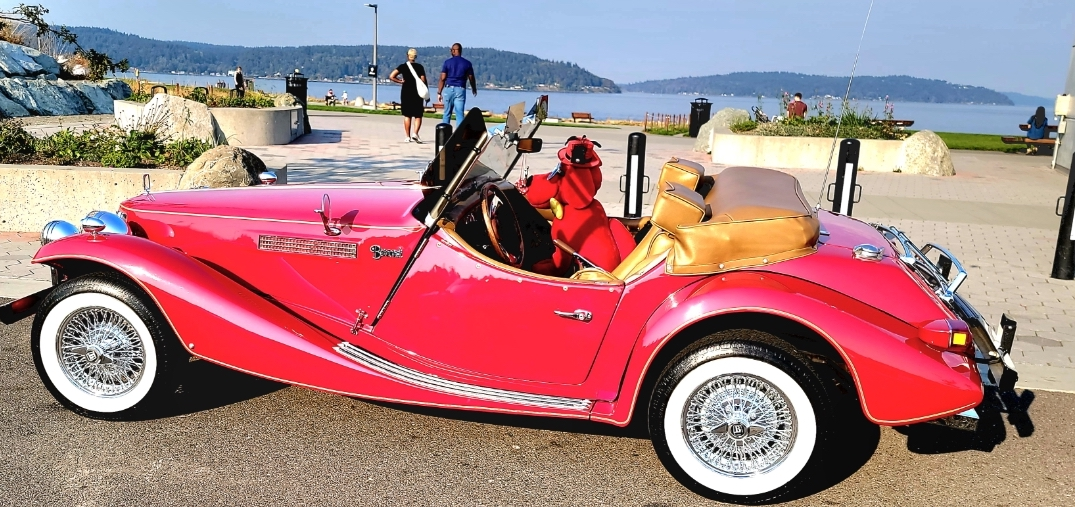
1980 Bernardi
