= Tucket's Ride =

1997 novel by Gary Paulsen

- First edition
- Author: Gary Paulsen
- Language: English
- Series: The Tucket Adventures
- Genre: Western novel
- Publisher: Delacorte Press
- Publication date: 1997
- Publication place: United States
- Media type: Print (hardback & paperback)
- ISBN: 0-385-32199-6
- Preceded by: Call Me Francis Tucket
- Followed by: Tucket's Gold

Tucket's Ride is the third novel in The Tucket Adventures by American author Gary Paulsen, published in 1997 by Delacorte Press.

It was later published as part of a five-part omnibus, entitled Tucket's Travels, along with the rest of the novels in The Tucket Adventures by Random House in 2003.

Tucket's Ride is set two years after Francis Tucket was abducted by the Pawnee, then saved by the Mountain Man Jason Grimes. Tucket is now trying to get to Oregon via Mexico and gets tangled with armies pursuing the Mexican War.
