= The Car (novel) =

Novel by Gary Paulsen

- The Car first edition cover.
- Author: Gary Paulsen
- Cover artist: Loudvik Akopyan
- Language: English
- Genre: Young adult fiction
- Publisher: Harcourt Children's Books
- Publication date: March 30, 1994
- Publication place: United States
- Media type: Print (hardback & paperback)
- Pages: 192 pp (first edition)
- ISBN: 978-0-15-292878-0
- OCLC: 29522845
- LC Class: PZ7.P2843 Car 1994

The Car is a 1993 novel by Gary Paulsen.

== Plot summary ==
Terry Anders is a fourteen-year-old boy living in Cleveland, Ohio whose parents didn't pay much attention to him. When both of his parents run away after an argument with each other (unknowingly abandoning him as each assumed that the other was staying), he assembles his father's old Blakely Bearcat kit car. He decides to go on a cross-country adventure to find an uncle that he vaguely remembers. Along the way, he befriends two Vietnam veterans, Waylon Jackson and Wayne, with whom he enjoys life on the open road. This book is about their adventure together as they travel across the country.
