= Gold (Sister Sparrow album) =

Studio album by Sister Sparrow
- Released: October 12, 2018
- Genre: Soul, rock
- Length: 32:52
- Label: Thirty Tigers
- Producer: Carter Matschullat

Sister Sparrow chronology
Fowl Play (2016)	Gold (2018)

Singles from Gold
- 1. "Ghost" Released: August 3, 2018; 2. "Bad Habit" Released: September 28, 2018

Gold is Sister Sparrow's fourth studio album, released on October 12, 2018 on Thirty Tigers. The album came after the band took a break while the lead singer, Arleigh Kincheloe, had a son in 2017.

== Track list ==
No.	Title	Writer(s)	Length
1.	"Gold"	Arleigh Kincheloe, Carter Matschullat, Joanna "Jojee" Barrat	3:14
2.	"Leave Here with Me"	A. Kincheloe, Matschullat, Kosuke Kasza, Sabrina "Sizzy Rocket" Bernstein	3:12
3.	"Ghost"	A. Kincheloe, Matschullat, Eren Cannata	3:11
4.	"Bad Habit"	A. Kincheloe, Matschullat, Kasza, Tyler James Bellinger	3:14
5.	"Can't Get You off My Mind"	A. Kincheloe, Geoffrey "Geoffro" Earley, Britt	3:06
6.	"Matter of Time"	A. Kincheloe	3:09
7.	"Frankie"	A. Kincheloe, Matschullat	3:58
8.	"Let's Go"	A. Kincheloe, Jackson Kincheloe, Matschullat, Bellinger	2:51
9.	"Plastic Paradise"	A. Kincheloe, Matschullat, Coyle Girelli	3:17
10.	"You're My Party"	A. Kincheloe, Matschullat, Jack "Kennedy" Herkel, Alex Reid	3:40
Total length:			32:52

== Personnel ==
Musicians

- Arleigh Kincheloe – vocals
- Carter Matschullat - piano, organ, keyboards, bass, guitar, percussion, optigan, mellotron, drums, strings arrangement (tracks 2, 6, 9, 10), horns arrangement (tracks 6, 9), woodwind arrangement (track 9)
- Jackson Kincheloe - harmonica, lap steel guitar
- Caito Sanchez - drums
- Dan Boyden - drums
- Josh Myers - bass
- Chris McLaughlin - guitar
- Coyle Girelli - guitar
- Eren Cannata - guitar
- Oliver Patrice Weder - piano, strings arrangement (tracks 6, 9)
- Morgan Wiley - piano, clarinet
- Phil Rodriguez - trumpet
- Brian Graham - baritone saxophone, tenor saxophone
- Sizzy Rocket - background vocals
- Tyler James Bellinger - background vocals

Production

- Carter Matschullat – producer, engineer
- Chris McLaughlin - engineer
- Areil Borujow - mixing (tracks 1 through 4)
- Steve Wall - mixing (tracks 5 through 10), additional engineering
- David Mohacsi - editing (tracks 3, 4, 6, 10)
- Mark Santangelo - mastering (at The Mastering Palace, NYC)
- Jimmy Gnecco - vocals recording (track 6)
- Danny Boyden - drums recording (tracks 4, 5, 7, 8, 9)
- Adam McHeffey Creatives – liner layout
- Kevin Condon – photography
