= Riffle (disambiguation) =

A riffle is a shallow landform in a flowing channel.

Riffle may also refer to:

- Charley Riffle (1918–2002), American football player (guard for Notre Dame)
- Dick Riffle (1915–1981), American football player (running back for the Philadelphia Eagles and the Pittsburgh Steelers)
- Riffle beetle – Family of beetles
- Riffle bug – Family of true bugs
- Riffle dace – Genus of fishes
- Riffle, Illinois, United States, an unincorporated community
- Riffle, West Virginia, United States, an unincorporated community
- Riffle (anonymity network)
- Riffle shuffle, a shuffling technique in cards
- In gold mining, a barrier on a sluice box

== See also ==
- Rifle (disambiguation)
- Ripple (disambiguation)
