= Blakely Auto Works =

Defunct American motor vehicle manufacturer

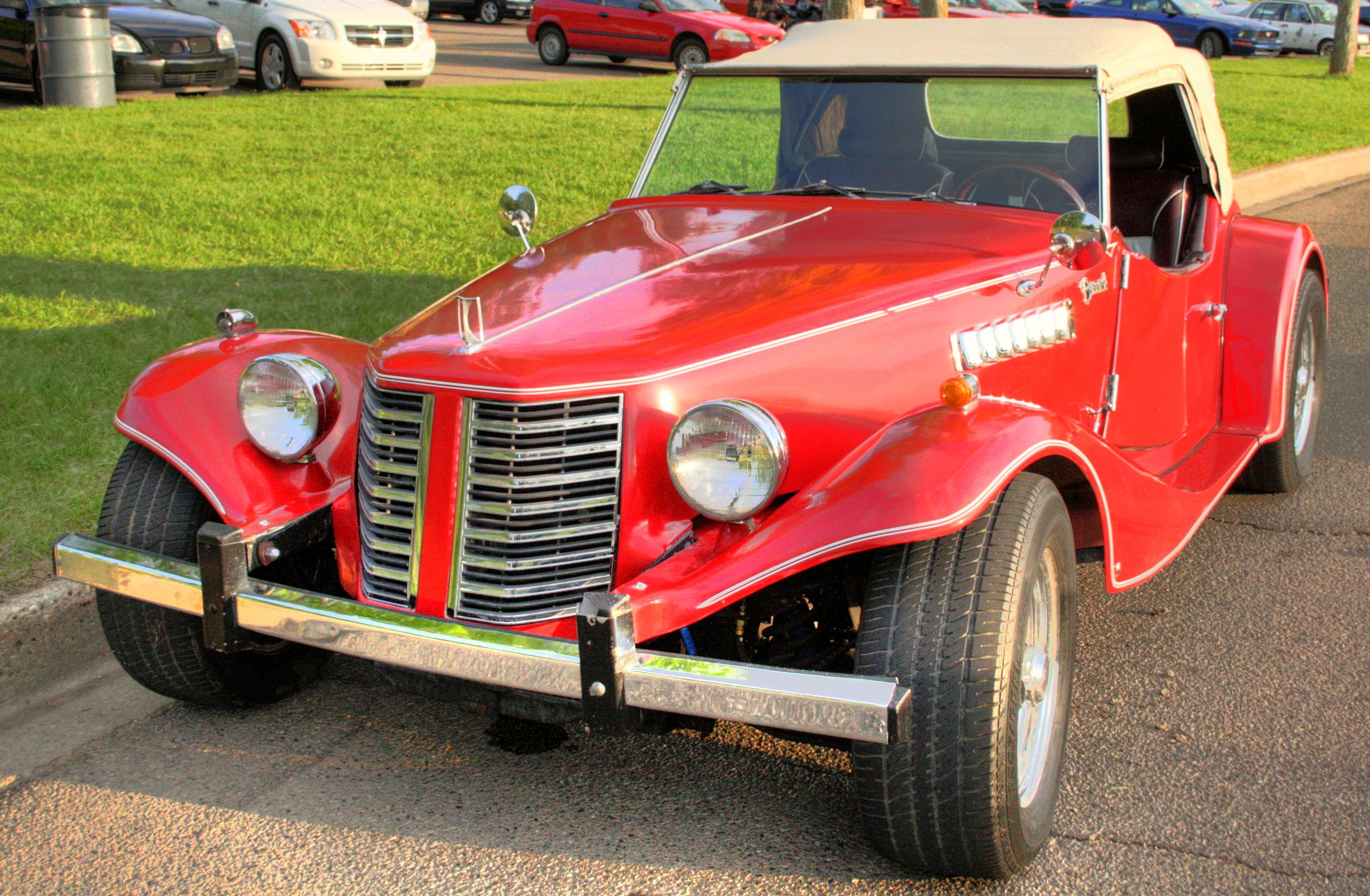
1988 Blakely Bernardi (US)

Blakely Auto Works (also called Bernardi Auto Works in later years) was a manufacturer of automobiles and of kit cars, working from premises located in a series of US midwest communities, including Princeton, Wisconsin, in the 1970s and 1980s. Blakely produced several kit car models, the Bantam, Bearcat, and Bernardi.

== History ==
Blakely Auto was founded by Dick Blakely to market affordable sports cars in the spirit of the legendary Lotus Seven: compact, lightweight, and with excellent handling. The Bantam was Blakely's first offering. It was followed by the larger Bearcat and eventually by the Bernardi.

The founder had a degree in mechanical engineering and had been involved in oval track racing prior to designing the Bantam. His goal with the initial design was to maximize performance while minimizing size, weight, accessories, and other features that might conflict with acceleration and handling. Blakely took inspiration from an early model of the British Dutton Cars, itself a Lotus Seven replica. After building the first car for himself, Blakely found sufficient interest from other auto enthusiasts to warrant building more cars of the same design. Partnering with Denny Myelle, Blakely began to produce the Bantam as a kit and also to develop a new, larger car that was more versatile and suited to off-track use. This second model became the Bearcat and later developed into the Bernardi.

For both models, a key design goal was use of a single donor automobile. Designs based on a single donor simplify the build process. The car Blakely selected was the Ford Pinto, with the option to use parts from close relatives like the Mercury Bobcat and the Ford Mustang. This family of donor vehicles gave the Blakely cars rack-and-pinion steering, front disk brakes, and a good selection of engine choices. For the chassis, Blakely Auto provided a frame of box steel tubing, custom front upper A-arms for the suspension, new shocks, and instructions for modifying and attaching the remaining chassis components from the donor car. Blakely Auto also supplied a full replacement body, including the body tub, doors, hood, fenders, trunk, convertible or hard top, and windshield.

Around 1979, ownership of the company transferred to Art Herschberger. In the Spring of 1979 he moved production from Davis Junction, Illinois to Princeton, Wisconsin. The early 1980s saw development and production of the Bernardi, a significant modification of the Bearcat model. In 1985, the company was renamed the Bernardi Auto Works. The business appears to have shut down in the late 1980s. Blakely automobiles still appear for sale in various specialist auto markets, but no new ones are being manufactured.

== Major products ==
- Bantam. The Bantam was similar to the Lotus Seven in size and drivetrain, although it used a slightly boxed-in ladder frame instead of the space frame favored by Lotus. It was intended primarily for track use, and was designed for light weight by avoiding inessentials such as doors, roof, or movable seats. The compact body and frame suited a small, straight-four engine choice like the Ford 1.6, 2.0, or 2.3 liter offering. Production of the Bantam continued into the 1980s, when the model was renamed the Hawk.
- Bearcat. This model had a unique appearance, not closely modeled on any of the classic sports cars usually providing inspiration to kit car designers. It was larger and twenty percent heavier than the Bantam, but much better suited to regular street use by virtue of its more spacious cab, adjustable seats, doors, removable hard- and soft-top roofs, rear trunk, and wider variety of possible engines. This model was the eponymous "star" of The Car, a novel.
- Bernardi. The Bernardi had the size and comfort provisions of the Bearcat, but a moderate exterior redesign made it resemble the 1950s British MG TD. Engine options included the four-cylinder choices of the Bantam, as well as the Ford 2.8 liter V6. The broader hood even made it feasible to install the 5.0 liter (302 c.i.) V8 engine used in the Ford Mustang II.
