= The Cookcamp =

1991 novel by Gary Paulsen

- The Cookcamp first edition cover.
- Author: Gary Paulsen
- Language: English
- Series: Alida's series
- Publisher: Scholastic
- Publication date: March 1, 1991
- Publication place: United States
- Media type: Print (hardback)
- Pages: 115 pp (first edition)
- ISBN: 0-531-05927-8
- OCLC: 22006371
- LC Class: PZ7.P2843 Co 1991
- Followed by: Alida's Song

The Cookcamp is a young adult novel by American author Gary Paulsen, published on March 1, 1991, by Scholastic. In 1999 it was followed by the sequel Alida's Song.

The story is about a boy who is sent to the north to live with his grandmother because of his parents being occupied with World War II.

Reviewers identified autobiographical elements to the story, particularly the grandmother, who is believed to be modeled on Paulsen's own grandmother. One reviewer called the book "a heart-warming nonfiction account of his childhood". In a review in The New York Times, Patty Campbell praised the book's "grave humor" and "almost unbearable poignancy". A review in Kirkus summarized the book as "a memorable evocation of a special time and place, grounded in authentic insight into deeper truths".
