= Carl Leverkus =

German chemist (1804–1889)

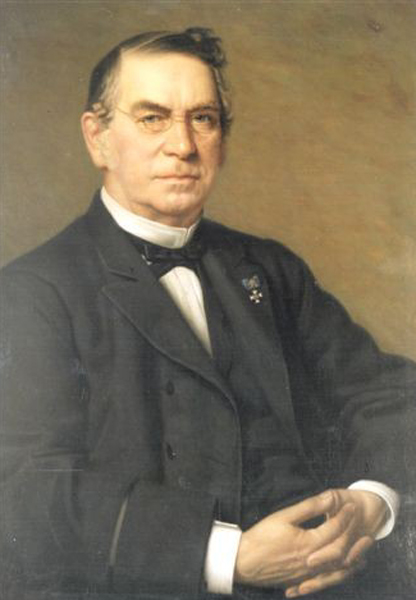
- Portrait of Carl Leverkus, painted in 1888 by Heinrich Johann Sinkel (1835-1908)
- Born: 5 November 1804; Wermelskirchen, Duchy of Berg, Holy Roman Empire
- Died: 4 February 1889 (aged 84); Wermelskirchen, German Empire
- Resting place: Wermelskirchen
- Education: University of Marburg; The Sorbonne; University of Giessen
- Known for: city of Leverkusen named after him
- Spouse: Juliane Auguste Küpper
- Children: 11
- Scientific career
- Fields: Chemistry
- Thesis: Abhandlung über das Silber: Sein Vorkommen; seine Reinigung und Eigenschaften ("A treatise on silver: Its occurrence, purification, and properties") (1830)

Carl Leverkus (5 November 1804 – 4 February 1889) was a German chemist and chemistry entrepreneur. The city of Leverkusen is named after him.

== Education ==
Leverkus started training as a pharmacist in 1822, and then studied at the University of Marburg. Following a stint as an assistant pharmacist in Trier, he went to Paris, where he worked at a pharmacy and studied chemistry at the Sorbonne in the evenings. In 1829, he took the apothecary examinations in Berlin. He earned his doctorate in 1830 from the University of Giessen with a dissertation on the chemistry of silver, which was reviewed by Justus von Liebig.

== Life and work ==
In 1834, Leverkus opened the first German factory for the production of artificial ultramarine blue in Wermelskirchen. Later he moved his factory to the Kahlberg in Wiesdorf. He called the emerging settlement "Leverkusen" after the family home in Lennep. The factory was a model plant with the latest technology and facilities, making it a big economic success.

Carl Leverkus and his wife were committed to social causes, so they took care of the needs of the factory's workforce, building homes for the workers, establishing a consumer association for them, founding the factory's own volunteer fire department, and starting a choir.

In 1884, Leverkus received the honorary title of Geheimer Kommerzienrat ("Privy Councillor of Commerce") and was made an honorary citizen of the city of Wermelskirchen.

In 1890, Leverkus' sons founded the company Vereinigte Ultramarinwerke ehemals Leverkus, Zeltner und Consorten ("United Ultramarine Works, formerly Leverkus, Zeltner, and associates"). The largest associate was the Nuremberg ultramarine factory Joh. Zeltner.

After Leverkus' death his sons sold a portion of the factory site in Wiesdorf to the alizarin manufacturer Elberfelder Farbenfabriken vorm in 1891. Friedr. Bayer & Co AG ("Elberfeld Colors, formerly Friedr. Bayer & Co AG"). Thus, Carl Leverkus' factory was the core of the present-day Bayer AG plant in Leverkusen.

Leverkus married Juliane Auguste Küpper in 1838 and had eleven children. He is buried in Wermelskirchen. In 1930, the city of Leverkusen was posthumously named after him. The German artist Martin Kippenberger was a great-great-grandson of Leverkus.
