= Hatchet (novel) =

1987 young-adult novel by Gary Paulsen

- First edition cover
- Author: Gary Paulsen
- Original title: Hatchet
- Language: English
- Series: Brian's Saga
- Genre: Young adult novel
- Publisher: Bradbury Press
- Publication date: September 1987
- Publication place: United States
- Media type: Hardcover, paperback, ebook
- Pages: 195 p. (first edition, hardback); 186 p. (second edition, paperback)
- ISBN: 0-02-770130-1 (first edition, hardback)
- OCLC: 15366056
- Dewey Decimal: [Fic] 19
- LC Class: PZ7.P2843 June 1987
- Followed by: The River

Hatchet is a 1987 young-adult wilderness survival novel written by American writer Gary Paulsen. It is the first novel of five in the Hatchet series. Other novels in the series include The River (1991), Brian's Winter (1996), Brian's Return (1999) and Brian's Hunt (2003). It was first published in September 1987 by Bradbury Press, and the recipient of the Newbery Honor Award in 1988.

== Plot ==
Brian Robeson is the 13-year-old son of divorced parents. As he travels from Hampton on a Cessna 406 bush plane to visit his father in the oil fields of Northern Canada for the summer, the pilot suddenly suffers a massive heart attack and dies. Brian assumes control of the plane and makes an effort to land, but he runs out of fuel in the process, forcing him to attempt a ditching, and as a result, crash-lands into an L-shaped lake in the middle of a vast forest. Brian survives the crash with a few major injuries, but manages to create a makeshift splint for them.

Throughout the summer, Brian learns how to survive on his own in the vast wilderness, with nothing but his windbreaker and a hatchet – a gift his mother gave him shortly before his plane departed. He discovers how to prepare a fire with the hatchet, and eats whatever food he can find, from rabbits and ruffed grouse – which he nicknames “fool-birds” – to turtle eggs, fish and choke cherries. Simultaneously, he deals with many of nature's dangers, including mosquitoes, a porcupine, two huge bears, one of which is a mother with her cubs, a pack of three wolves, a skunk, a bad-tempered female moose, and even a tornado.

Over time, Brian develops his survival skills and becomes a fine woodsman. He crafts a bow, some arrows, and a fishing spear to aid in his hunting. He also fashions a shelter out of the underside of a rock overhang. During his time alone, Brian struggles with memories of home as well as the conflicting memory of his mother, whom Brian had caught cheating on his father before their divorce.

When a sudden tornado hits the area, it brings the tail of the plane to the surface of the lake. This brings Brian to believe that there may be a survival pack on the plane. He makes a raft from a few broken-off treetops to get to the plane. While cutting his way through the fuselage into the tail section, he drops his hatchet in the lake and nearly drowns as he dives to get it. Once inside the plane, Brian finds a survival pack that includes an array of tools, additional food, an emergency transmitter, and a .22 AR-7 rifle.

Back on shore, Brian activates the transmitter, but not knowing how to use it, he believes it is broken from water damage and tosses it aside. However, the distress beacon was still functional, and the signal is picked up by the pilot of a passing airplane, and he is rescued. The epilogue explains that Brian had spent the remainder of the summer with his father but did not disclose his mother's affair, and how surviving on his own for a total of fifty-four days had a permanent effect on him for the better.

== Sequels ==
Paulsen continued the story of Brian Robeson with four more novels, beginning with The River in 1991, which sees Brian returning to the wilderness to show his survival strategies to the military.

Brian's Winter was released in 1996 as a "what if" narrative about how Brian would have survived if he had not been rescued and instead had to survive the winter in the wilderness.

Brian's Return was released in 1999 and describes Brian's life after returning to civilization. It follows the timeline established in Brian's Winter.

Brian's Hunt was released in 2003. In the novel, Brian is out canoeing and then senses danger nearby when he finds a wounded dog.

The series concludes with Guts: The True Stories Behind Hatchet and the Brian Books, which provides information about the behind-the-scenes stories and how Brian Robeson got there.

== Film adaptation ==
A film adaptation titled A Cry in the Wild was released in 1990.

Another film adaptation is in development at Netflix with Derek Cianfrance writing and directing.

== Reception ==
Hatchet was a recipient of the 1988 Newbery Honor. In 2012, it was ranked number 23 on a list of the top 100 children's novels published by School Library Journal.

== Bibliography ==
- Paulsen, Gary (1999). Hatchet. Simon & Schuster. ISBN 978-1-4169-3647-3.

== Notes ==
- Salvner, Gary M. (2001). "Lessons and Lives: Why Young Adult Literature Matters". The ALAN Review. 28 (3): 9. doi:10.21061/alan.v28i3.a.2.
- Sturm, Brian W. (Winter 2009). "The Structure of Power in Young Adult Problem Novels". Young Adult Library Services. 7 (2): 39–47.
- Unwin, Cynthia G.; Palmer, Brian (1999). "Survival as a Bridge to Resistant Readers: Applications of Gary Paulsen's Hatchet to an Integrated Curriculum". The ALAN Review. 26 (3): 9–12. doi:10.21061/alan.v27i1.a.3.

Awards
Preceded by On My Honor	Winner of the William Allen White Children's Book Award; 1990	Succeeded by Beauty
