= Sister Sparrow & the Dirty Birds =

American soul and rock band

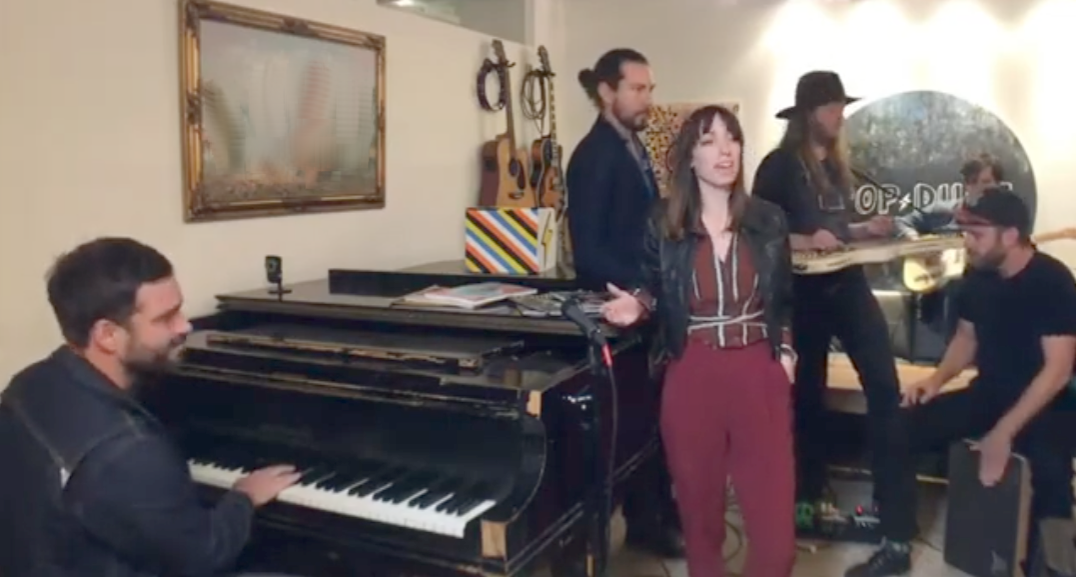
- Performing in 2018

Background information
- Origin: New York City, New York
- Genres: Rock, blues, soul, funk
- Years active: 2008–present
- Members: Arleigh Kincheloe; Jackson Kincheloe; Josh Myers; Dan Boyden; Phil Rodriguez; Brian Graham
- Past members: Sasha Brown; Aidan Carroll; JJ Byars; Johnny Butler; Bram Kincheloe; Ryan Snow; Cole Kamen-Green
- Website: sistersparrow.com

Sister Sparrow & the Dirty Birds is a Brooklyn, New York-based seven-piece soul/rock band. The band is led by singer Arleigh Kincheloe, with Jackson Kincheloe on harmonica, Josh Myers on bass, Dan Boyden on drums, Phil Rodriguez on trumpet, and Brian Graham on baritone and tenor saxophones.

Since 2011, Sister Sparrow & the Dirty Birds have played at venues across the US and Canada. Their list of festival appearances includes Bonnaroo, Firefly, Mountain Jam, Bear Creek, Telluride Jazz, High Sierra, Rooster Walk, Harvest Jazz Festival and late-night sets at Austin City Limits and the Jazz & Heritage Festival in New Orleans.

== History ==
Frontwoman Sister Sparrow first began writing music while living between New York City and the Catskill Mountains as a teenager. Accompanied by her brother Jackson on harmonica, the band first got together in September 2008. While Sister Sparrow is the principal songwriter of the band, the entire band works collaboratively on arrangements.

By the middle of 2009, Sister Sparrow & the Dirty Birds had a weekly show at New York's Rockwood Music Hall on Saturday nights, holding down a five-month-long residency there.

The band embarked on its first tour at the end of April 2011. By the end of the year, they had played about 150 shows in 28 states. They opened for bands and musicians such as Dr. John, Sharon Jones & The Dap-Kings, and the Soul Rebels Brass Band.

== Recordings ==
=== Sister Sparrow and the Dirty Birds (2010) ===
Sister Sparrow and the Dirty Birds released its self-titled debut album in November 2010. It was recorded almost completely live in just one night at Avatar Studios in New York City. The album was listed as one of the top Non-Jazz Favorites for 2010 by All About Jazz. Independent Media Magazine awarded it the "Best album you probably didn't hear in 2010" in its 2010 IMM Music Awards.

=== Pound of Dirt (2012) ===
On February 28 they released their second album Pound of Dirt.

=== Fight EP (2013) ===
In March 2013, the band went into the legendary Henson Recording Studios in LA and recorded an EP with Grammy-award winner and former American Idol judge Randy Jackson. The EP consisted of four songs and was released in October of the same year.

=== The Weather Below (2015) ===
The third studio album by the band was released on May 18, 2015. It was recorded at Bear Creek Studio in Woodinville, Washington over three weeks in December 2014. The album is produced by Ryan Hadlock, and written by Arleigh Kincheloe.

=== Fowl Play (2016) ===
The band's first live album was released on March 4, 2016. It was recorded at The Warehouse in Fairfield, Connecticut on December 31, 2015. The album was recorded by Lucas Tecun, mixed by Micah Davis, and mastered by Greg Calbi.

=== Gold (2018) ===
Sister Sparrow released a new single, "Ghost," on August 3, 2018 in anticipation of the next album, Gold, out October 12, 2018 on Thirty Tigers. The album was produced and co-written in collaboration with Carter Matschullat at Brooklyn's DØØM Studio.

== Band members ==
Sister Sparrow, also known as Arleigh Kincheloe, is the frontwoman of the Dirty Birds. She was born and raised in the Catskill Mountains of New York, where she began singing in her parents' band at the age of nine.

Jackson Kincheloe was raised in upstate New York by musician parents. Starting on trumpet and drums in grade school, moving to tuba and guitar in high school, he eventually stuck with the harmonica and joined his sister Arleigh.

Bassist Josh Myers was born outside of Boston Massachusetts and lives in Brooklyn New York. He has appeared on more than 20 recordings and played alongside John Scofield, Kenny Werner, Ralph Alessi, and Wayne Krantz. In the US, he has performed at Carnegie Hall, Lincoln Center, New York's Blue Note Jazz Club, and the Library of Congress.

Drummer Dan Boyden hails from Portland, Maine. Before joining the Dirty Birds, he was an active member of the local music scene. He is a founding member of funk/soul outfit Model Airplane and has played with numerous bands and artists including The Kenya Hall Band, Connor Garvey, Sara Hallie Richardson, and Christian Cuff.

Baritone Saxophonist Brian Graham was born in NYC, raised in Bennington, VT and studied Jazz Performance at The University of Southern Maine. In addition to working with the Dirty Birds, he is a co-leader of The Fogcutters, a 19-piece Big Band based in Portland, Maine. He is also member of the seven piece funk band Sly-Chi, and co-creator of Big Band Syndrome. He has shared the stage with John Popper (Blues Traveler), Chris Barron (Spin Doctors), The Soul Rebels Brass Band, and Big Sam's Funky Nation.

Trumpeter Phil Rodriguez was born and raised in Santa Barbara, California, where he began studying piano at age five and trumpet at age twelve. He holds a degree in jazz studies from the University of Southern California. In addition to his work with Sister Sparrow and the Dirty Birds, he performs regularly with jazz-rockers East West Quintet, neo-soul band The Hipstones, and punk-improv quartet The (Notorious) L.A. Music Scene. He has recorded with Hercules and Love Affair, Jessica 6, Wires Under Tension, Industrial Jazz Group, Eleanor Friedberger of The Fiery Furnaces, Jenny Owen Youngs, and Jinsai. Phil also leads and composes for his own ensemble, a six-piece slowcore post-jazz group called Underbelly.

In early 2013, the band announced that three original members, JJ Byars, Johnny Butler, and Aidan Carroll were leaving to pursue other projects. The band also announced the addition of baritone saxophonist Brian Graham and bassist Josh Myers. In 2014, original members Ryan Snow and Bram Kincheloe also left to pursue other projects.

== Discography ==
=== Studio albums ===
Year	Details
2010	Sister Sparrow & the Dirty Birds: Released: November 22, 2010; Label: Modern Vintage Recordings
2012	Pound of Dirt: Released: February 28, 2012; Label: Modern Vintage Recordings
2015	The Weather Below: Released: May 18, 2015; Label: Party Fowl Records, Thirty Tigers
2018	Gold: Released: October 12, 2018; Label: Party Fowl Records, Thirty Tigers

=== Live album ===
Year	Details
2016	Fowl Play: Released: March 4, 2016; Label: Party Fowl Records, Thirty Tigers

=== Extended Play ===
Year	Details
2013	Fight: Released: October 1, 2013; Label: Modern Vintage Recordings
