= The Legend of Red Horse Cavern =

Novel by Gary Paulsen

- Author: Gary Paulsen
- Language: English
- Series: World of Adventure
- Genre: Young adult novel
- Publisher: Yearling
- Publication date: September 1, 1994
- Publication place: United States
- Media type: Print (Paperback)
- Pages: 80 pp
- ISBN: 0-440-41023-1
- OCLC: 31252026
- LC Class: PZ7.P2843 Le 1994
- Followed by: Rodomonte's Revenge

The Legend of Red Horse Cavern is the first novel in the World of Adventure series by American author Gary Paulsen. It was first published on September 1, 1994 by Yearling.

The audiobook was narrated by Jeff Woodman.

== Plot ==
Apache Will Little Bear Tucker and his friend Sarah Thompson spot a treasure chest, get held captive by the villains and later escape. After Sarah is recaptured, Will rescues her, they solve the legend of Red Horse and Will disposes of a villain.
