= The Weather Below =

Studio album by Sister Sparrow & the Dirty Birds
- Released: May 18, 2015
- Genre: Rock, alternative
- Length: 38:52
- Label: Party Fowl Records, Thirty Tigers
- Producer: Ryan Hadlock: Commander Screemo (Exec. producer); Dr. Emily M. Sabbagh (Exec. producer); James Rossides (Exec. producer)

Sister Sparrow & the Dirty Birds chronology
Fight (2013)	The Weather Below (2015)	Fowl Play (2016)

The Weather Below is Sister Sparrow & the Dirty Birds's second studio album, released on May 18, 2015 on Party Fowl Records, Thirty Tigers. The album is their first to be released on their own label, Party Fowl Records. The album was produced by Ryan Hadlock at Bear Creek Studio in a three week session.

== Track list ==
All tracks are written by Arleigh Kincheloe, except where noted

No.	Title	Writer(s)	Length
1.	"Borderline"	A. Kincheloe, Jackson Kincheloe, Bram Kincheloe, Sasha Brown, Josh Myers, Brian D. Graham, Phil Rodriguez, Ryan Snow	4:12
2.	"Sugar"	A. Kincheloe, Theron "Neff-U" Feemster	3:02
3.	"Prison Cells"		3:49
4.	"Mama Knows"		3:32
5.	"Disappear"		2:53
6.	"Don't Be Jealous"	A. Kincheloe, S. Brown	4:39
7.	"Every Road"	A. Kincheloe, Lasse "Pilfinger" Kramhøft	4:01
8.	"We Need a Love"		3:52
9.	"Cold Blooded"		4:14
10.	"Catch Me If You Can"	A. Kincheloe, S. Brown	4:38
