= Pound of Dirt =

Studio album by Sister Sparrow & the Dirty Birds
- Released: February 28, 2012
- Genre: Memphis soul, funk, garage rock, blues
- Length: 46:35
- Label: Modern Vintage Recordings
- Producer: Brian Bender: Eshy Gazit (Exec. producer); Patrick Ermlich (Exec. producer)

Sister Sparrow & the Dirty Birds chronology
Sister Sparrow & the Dirty Birds (2010)	Pound of Dirt (2012)	Fight (2013)

Pound of Dirt is Sister Sparrow & the Dirty Birds's second studio album, released on February 28, 2012 on Modern Vintage Recordings. The title of the album came from a quote from the mother of singer Arleigh Kincheloe and brother Jackson Kincheloe who used to say after some food fell on the floor that she should "Pick that up and eat it -- you've got to eat a pound of dirt before you die". The song "Too Much" was written a year earlier, in early 2011. When the band was laying down the track, Sasha the guitar player found his 1950s Fender Tweed amp had caught fire when the transformer blew out. The band felt that summed up the intensity of the song. The band also created a video for their song, "Make It Rain". Their album was released on the same day as fellow Brooklyn musician, rapper Maino, so that brought them together to make the video. The video was "inspired by the grit and grime of Brooklyn, where both Sister Sparrow & The Dirty Birds and Maino are from."

== Track list ==
All tracks are written by Arleigh Kincheloe, except where noted

No.	Title	Writer(s)	Length
1.	"Make It Rain"		3:31
2.	"Millie Mae"		4:53
3.	"Bulldozer"		1:49
4.	"Too Much"		3:17
5.	"Hollow Bones"		6:03
6.	"Lasso"	Sister Sparrow & the Dirty Birds	4:26
7.	"This Crazy Torpedo"		0:48
8.	"Another Ride"		4:52
9.	"Feather of a Queen"		1:36
10.	"No Rest"		3:38
11.	"Dirt"	A. Kincheloe, Jackson Kincheloe	4:04
12.	"Horse to Water"		7:38
