= How Angel Peterson Got His Name =

Book by Gary Paulsen

- How Angel Peterson Got His Name first edition cover.
- Author: Gary Paulsen
- Cover artist: Hank Nick Cocotos
- Language: English
- Genre: young adult biography
- Publisher: Wendy Lamb Books
- Publication date: January 14, 2003
- Publication place: United States
- Media type: Print (Hardback & Paperback)
- Pages: 128 pp (first edition)
- ISBN: 0-385-72949-9
- OCLC: 49921982
- Dewey Decimal: 813/.54 B 21
- LC Class: PS3566.A834 Z467 2003

How Angel Peterson Got His Name: And Other Outrageous Tales About Extreme Sports is a nonfiction, young adult memoir written by American author Gary Paulsen, published January 14, 2003, by Wendy Lamb Books. The book outlines the experiences of Paulsen and his friends during the mid-1950s. The book includes discussions of hang gliding and bike riding.

In 2004, the Young Adult Library Services Association named How Angel Peterson Got His Name in their list of Best Books for Young Adults.
