= Sister Sparrow & the Dirty Birds (album) =

Studio album by Sister Sparrow & the Dirty Birds
- Released: November 22, 2010
- Studio: Avatar (New York, New York)
- Genre: Rock, R&B, soul
- Length: 52:29
- Label: Modern Vintage Recordings
- Producer: Eshy Gazit, Patrick Ermlich

Sister Sparrow & the Dirty Birds chronology
Sister Sparrow & the Dirty Birds (2010)	Pound of Dirt (2012)

Professional ratings
Review scores
Source	Rating
Nashville Music Guide	7/10 stars

Sister Sparrow & the Dirty Birds is Sister Sparrow & the Dirty Birds's debut album, released on November 22, 2010 on Modern Vintage Recordings. It was recorded almost completely live in one night at Avatar Studios in New York City. The album was listed as one of the top Non-Jazz Favorites for 2010 by All About Jazz. Independent Media Magazine awarded it the "Best album you probably didn't hear in 2010" in its 2010 IMM Music Awards.

== Track list ==
All tracks are written by Arleigh Kincheloe, except where noted

No.	Title	Writer(s)	Length
1.	"Untie My Shoelaces"		4:07
2.	"Quicksand"		3:15
3.	"Boom Boom"		5:13
4.	"Freight Train"		4:06
5.	"Rock in It"		3:44
6.	"Just My Eyes"		3:36
7.	"Eddy"		4:55
8.	"Baby from Space"		3:19
9.	"Vices"	A. Kincheloe, Jackson Kincheloe	4:20
10.	"Who Are You?"	A. Kincheloe, Jackson Kincheloe, John Kincheloe	3:21
11.	"My House"		6:15
12.	"Roadtrip"	A. Kincheloe, John Embree	6:18
