= The Tent (Paulsen novel) =

1995 novel by Gary Paulsen

- Hardback edition
- Author: Gary Paulsen
- Language: English
- Genre: Novel
- Publisher: Harcourt
- Publication date: April 24, 1995
- Publication place: United States
- Media type: Print (Hardback & Paperback)
- Pages: 96 pp
- ISBN: 0-15-292879-0
- OCLC: 31331266
- LC Class: PZ7.P2843 Te 1995

The Tent (also known as The Tent: A Parable in One Sitting) is a parable by Gary Paulsen that was published in 1995. It centers on the story of a boy named Steven and his father, who create a plan to relieve their poverty by offering preaching and church services from a mobile tent throughout the Bible Belt.

Reviews were mixed. In School Library Journal, Bernie Morrissey praised the audiobook version, saying, the narrator "MacLeod Andrews masters many colorful characters' voices and accents, and his performance adds to listeners' enjoyment." Publishers Weekly said, "The pacing is expert and the settings dense, but the symbolism and message are trumpeted too loudly, drowning out attempts to create lifelike complexity."
