= Tente International =

TENTE International GmbH
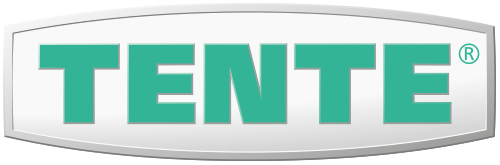
- Company type: GmbH
- Industry: Manufacturer of castors
- Founded: 1923
- Headquarters: Cologne, Germany
- Products: Wheels, casters
- Revenue: €263.5 m. (2025)
- Number of employees: 1,580 (2025)
- Website: www.tente.com

TENTE International GmbH, based in Cologne, Germany, is the holding company of the TENTE Group. Castors and wheels are manufactured under the TENTE registered trademark.

The history of the company began in 1923 in the district of Wermelskirchen Tente with the sale of ball castors and castors for sliding cupboard doors. TENTE-ROLLEN GmbH in Wermelskirchen is the largest subsidiary of TENTE International GmbH. With the production of castors and wheels for hospital beds, shopping trolleys, furniture and transport trolleys, TENTE developed into the city's second largest employer in the following years.

== Founding and development up to 1970 ==
Adolf Schulte founded TENTE-ROLLEN GmbH as a sales company in 1923. The range of products included cast iron castors, piano castors, furniture and sliding door castors, as well as tracks and fittings. The company began its own production from a garage ten years later. TENTE's product range grew continuously during the initial years of the economic miracle. From 1954, TENTE presented its products under the company logo with a Roman chariot at national and international trade fairs. Five years later, the company moved to new factory and offices in Tente-Herrlinghausen.

In 1963, the institutional castor with swivel brake was unveiled for the first time, an innovation that is known today as a directional lock. Internationalisation for TENTE began one year later with membership of European standardisation committees. With the move to the new offices in 1965, electronic data processing also found its way into TENTE. In 1968, castor production exceeded 10 million units for the first time. Two years later, one of Europe's first computerised high rack warehouses emerged at Tente.

== Development from 1971 to 1999 ==
TENTE South Africa, TENTE's first branch office, was founded together with the Protea Holding Group in South Africa in 1971. In 1973, TENTE-ROLLEN GmbH expanded and started to operate a second high rack warehouse. TENTE USA is situated in Hebron, Kentucky, and was founded in 1979. It develops and produces castors and wheels specifically for the US market.

In 1983, Raymond Schulte resigned as managing partner, and Dr Dietrich Fricke, who had been the managing director of TENTE in Wermelskirchen since 1958, acquired the partner's shares. The first steps to present the company with a new corporate identity as a global brand already began in 1985. TENTE acquired competitor 'Hufa-Rollen' a few years later and, thanks to Hufa's international subsidiaries, now has a stronger market presence in England, France, Ireland, Belgium and the Netherlands. Some of these companies were already agents of TENTE before the acquisition was made.

1991 saw the introduction of a new generation of hospital bed castors, which were awarded numerous product design prizes.

In 1994, TENTE developed its corporate identity for the 21st century with a modernised logo and a new corporate colour. Two years later, after acquiring the castor division of the company Schulte, the 'Greif' product name was added to the range. The Czech subsidiary has been part of the TENTE company since 1997 and also serves Slovakia. Since 1997 new technologies have enabled the development of further products. Within a very short time, the hospital bed castor 'INTEGRAL' received two design awards. In 1998, TENTE founded a Spanish subsidiary in Barcelona, TENTE Spain, which also serves the Portuguese market. The company celebrated its 75th anniversary in the same year. In addition, expansions to its factory and to the offices were completed, and the third fully computerised high rack warehouse was built.

== Development from 2000 to 2024 ==
In the year 2000, the acquisition of BRUANDET, a leading manufacturer of chair and furniture castors, rounded off the TENTE range in this market segment. Since 2002 there has been a subsidiary in Sweden; a 'North' branch based in Bönen and a 'South' branch in Nersingen were founded in Germany in the same year. In the financial year 2003, TENTE Polyurethane Parts S.A.S. in Macon, France, was taken over as a polyurethane specialist to further the company's activities in the heavy duty field.

In 2005, TENTE founded a production plant and a sales office in Suzhou, China. In the two years that followed, further subsidiaries emerged in Hungary, Finland, Canada, Norway and Japan. In 2007, TENTE-ROLLEN GmbH founded a subsidiary in Poznań, Poland, which became a subsidiary of TENTE International GmbH in 2013. TENTE Schwerlasttechnik GmbH, specialising in the manufacture of heavy duty castors and wheels, was founded in 2008. The agent in Denmark (a TENTE agent since 1961) became a subsidiary in the same year. In the two years that followed, TENTE founded further subsidiaries in Italy, Latvia, Russia, Australia and Switzerland. In 2013, two more subsidiaries were founded, this time in Belarus and in the Ukraine. In 2017, the Canadian castor manufacturer Bestway Caster & Wheels was acquired by TENTE. In 2024 TENTE announced the acquisition of the Canadian castor manufacturer Darcor Limited.
