= The Winter Room =

1989 novel by Gary Paulsen

- Author: Gary Paulsen
- Language: English
- Publisher: Scholastic Books, 1989
- Publication place: United States
- Media type: Print (hardback & paperback)
- Pages: 103
- Awards: Newbery Honor Book, 1990

The Winter Room is a young adult novel by American author Gary Paulsen. It is a realistic fiction story about logging and farming, narrated in the first person to two boys by their Norwegian uncle in the "winter room" of a farm in northern Minnesota, United States. Like many of Paulsen's works, it evokes a harsh rural environment using vivid imagery, and has elements of a coming of age tale.

The Winter Room received the 1990 Newbery Honor.

== Reception ==
The Winter Room was well received by critics. Upon the novel's release, James A. Schmitz of The ALAN Review rated the novel as one of Paulsen's best.

While evoking the works of Laura Ingalls Wilder, Ernest Hemingway, and Jim Harrison, Publishers Weekly proclaimed that "Newbery Award-winner Paulsen never disappoints, and proves his talent again in this remarkably good tale."

Kirkus Reviews called The Winter Room a "beautifully written evocation of a Minnesota farm", while noting that it's "more a prose poem than a novel".

== Release details ==
- 1989, USA, Scholastic Press (ISBN 0-531-05839-5), Pub date ? September 1989, hardback (1st edition)
- 1989, USA, Orchard Books (ISBN 0-531-08439-6), Pub date ? October 1989, hardback
- 1996, USA, Yearling Books (ISBN 0-440-40454-1), Pub date ? July 1996, paperback
- 1991, USA, Perfection Learning Prebound (ISBN 0-7807-0416-9), Pub date ? September 1991, hardback
- 1991, USA, Bantam Doubleday Dell (ISBN 0-440-80228-8), Pub date ? April 1991, paperback
- 1995, USA, Yearling Books (ISBN 99954-61-53-6), Pub date ? February 1995, paperback
- 1996, ?, Laurel Leaf (ISBN 0-440-22031-9), Pub date 2 May 1996, paperback
- 1998, ?, Laurel Leaf (ISBN 0-440-22783-6), Pub date ? December 1998, paperback
- 1999, ?, Rebound by Sagebrush (ISBN 0-8335-6149-9), Pub date ? October 1999, hardback
- 2005, USA, Thorndike Press (ISBN 0-7862-7251-1), Pub date 16 February 2005, hardback (large print edition)
