= Woodsong =

Collection of memoirs by Gary Paulsen

- First edition
- Author: Gary Paulsen
- Illustrator: Ruth W. Paulsen (Spouse)
- Language: English
- Subject: Outdoor Life, Dog sledding.
- Genre: Juvenile Non-fiction
- Published: 1990 (Simon & Schuster Children's Publishing)
- Publication place: United States
- Media type: Hardcover and Paperback (Later Editions)
- Pages: 132 (1st Edition)
- ISBN: 0027702219 (1st Edition)

Woodsong is a book of memoirs by American author Gary Paulsen, published August 1, 1990 by Bradbury. The first half consists of Paulsen's early experiences running sled dogs in Minnesota and then in Alaska, and the second half describes the roads and animals he faces in the Iditarod Trail Sled Dog Race.

== Plot summary ==
Paulsen opens his book with a vivid retelling of a story in which he watched brush wolves kill and devour a live doe in the woods. This event revealed the raw, unfabricated realities of nature to him. Paulsen recounts many incidents he has undergone with his dogs on their runs, including times he has been carried to safety by his sled dogs after breaking his knee on the trail, became violently ill in the midst of extreme cold conditions, and a variety of mysterious happenings in the Alaskan wilderness. In all of their adventures, he bonds closely with his dogs, particularly one named Storm. Storm is portrayed as an ideal dog that taught Paulsen many life values.

Part One closes, and Part Two begins with Paulsen entering a team of fifteen of his dogs in the Iditarod Sled Dog Race, an approximately 1,153.2 mile-long sled dog race from Anchorage, Alaska to Nome, Alaska. The race proves to be long and arduous. Extreme cold conditions and difficult terrain put both him and his team to the test. He is repeatedly afflicted by lifelike hallucinations caused by extreme sleep deprivation, such as a man with a trench coat talking about educational grants, and hallucinating about a man hallucinating. But Gary is spurred onward by the beauty of the race and his devotion to the team. During the race, Gary experiences a unique feeling when he is running with his dogs. After nearly seventeen days, he at last crosses the finish line in Nome. He places last in the race, but accomplishment and adventure are all that matter to him. Gary feels at home and a sense of peace when he is sledding with the dogs in the race.

The main characters include Paulsen (the narrator), Dollar, Storm, Yogi, Obeah, Duran, Columbia, Cookie, Olaf, Dunberry, Scarhead, Hawk, Neil, Fred, Clarence, Alex, Wilson, and Blue (dogs).

== Reception ==
Woodsong was well received by critics, including a starred review from Kirkus Reviews, who wrote, "This may be Paulsen's best book yet: it should delight and enthrall almost any reader."

According to Publishers Weekly, the book "blends deep introspection with fast-paced action and succeeds admirably on both levels".
