= The Rifle =

Novel by Gary Paulsen

- Author: Gary Paulsen
- Cover artist: Jennifer Jackman (photograph © Stockbyte/Getty)
- Language: English
- Subject: U.S. history, rifles
- Genre: historical fiction
- Publisher: Harcourt
- Publication date: September 1995
- Publication place: United States
- Pages: 112
- ISBN: 0-440-21920-5

The Rifle is a 1995 novel by American writer Gary Paulsen, published in September 1995 by Harcourt.

The novel is a work of historical fiction, written for a young adult audience. The story focuses on the history of a rifle crafted prior to the American Revolution, and on the lives of its various owners until the present day. Although Paulsen romanticizes the creation and the uniqueness of the rifle, the novel provides a sober reminder of the importance of handling guns responsibly.

== Plot ==
The novel begins prior to the American Revolution. A gunsmith named Cornish McManus, inspired by a piece of maple stock, crafts a rifle which turns out to be exceedingly accurate. Later, McManus is forced to sell the rifle, which comes into the ownership of a soldier in the Revolution named John Byam. After Byam's death, the rifle passes to a woman named Sarah, who stores it in an attic, where it is forgotten. The rifle passes through several owners, being lost, rediscovered, and sold as an antique. It ultimately comes to rest on the mantle of a mechanic named Harv Kline. Unbeknownst to its owner, the rifle is loaded, and the gunpowder is inadvertently ignited by a stray spark. The rifle discharges, killing the 14-year-old son of a neighbor.

== Reception ==
Publishers Weekly referred to Paulsen as "a gifted storyteller", while noting that he "could have plucked this plot straight from any newspaper-an accidental shooting with a loaded gun". They concluded by calling The Rifle "a truly mesmerizing tale, from beginning to end".

Kirkus Reviews described the novel as being "as shattering as the awful events it depicts", while holding appeal for readers on both sides of the gun control debate.
