= Brian's Winter =

1996 novel by Gary Paulsen

- First edition
- Author: Gary Paulsen
- Audio read by: Richard Thomas
- Language: English
- Series: Brian's Saga
- Genre: Young adult
- Publisher: Delacorte Press
- Publication date: January 1996
- Publication place: United States
- Media type: Print (paperback)
- Pages: 134 pg
- ISBN: 0-590-69013-2
- OCLC: 38465608
- Preceded by: The River
- Followed by: Brian's Return

Brian's Winter is a 1996 young adult novel by American author Gary Paulsen. The audiobook is narrated by American actor Richard Thomas.

Brian's Winter is the third novel in the Hatchet series, but second in terms of chronology as an alternate ending sequel to Hatchet. It was also released as Hatchet: Winter by Pan Macmillan on February 9, 1996.

== Background ==
At the end of the novel Hatchet, thirteen-year-old Brian Robeson, who has been trapped in the Canadian wilderness after a plane accident, decides to dive for a "survival pack" from the submerged aircraft. He almost drowns trying to tear the plane open. He recovers, among other things, an emergency transmitter. Within hours, a pilot receives the beacon and rescues him. The book ends with a note that Brian, who learned wilderness survival through trial and error, probably would not have survived the upcoming harsh winter on his own.

Paulsen says that many readers wrote to him, complaining about the deus ex machina ending. In response, Paulsen wrote Brian's Winter, which explores what would have happened if Brian had not activated the transmitter.

== Plot summary ==
The story deals with Brian, still stranded at the L-shaped lake during the fall and winter, constructing a winter shelter, building snow shoes, being confronted by a bear, befriending and naming a skunk and learning how to make a bow more powerful. Eventually, Brian meets a family of Cree trappers, the Smallhorns, who help him return home.

== Continuity with series ==
Brian's Winter is followed by the two sequels, Brian's Return and Brian's Hunt, which refer back to the events in Brian's Winter. The River does not, and expressly discards the events of Brian's Winter when Brian tells Derek Holtzer that he only spent fifty-four days in the wilderness.

== Reception ==
Brian's Winter was well received by critics, including a starred review from Kirkus Reviews.

Publishers Weekly discussed how "the pace never relents," given that "the story begins, as it were, in the middle, with Brian already toughened up and his reflexes primed for crisis." They also highlighted the numerous cliffhangers and "supreme challenges" throughout the pages.

The Young Adult Library Services Association included Brian's Winter on their 1997 list of Quick Picks for Reluctant Young Adult Readers.
