= The Case of the Dirty Bird =

1992 novel by Gary Paulsen

- The Case of the Dirty Bird first edition cover.
- Author: Gary Paulsen
- Language: English
- Series: Culpepper Adventures
- Publisher: Dell Publishing
- Publication date: June 1, 1992
- Publication place: United States
- Media type: Print (paperback)
- ISBN: 0-440-40598-X
- OCLC: 26165825
- Followed by: Dunc's Doll

The Case of the Dirty Bird is the first novel in the Culpepper Adventures series by American author Gary Paulsen, June 1, 1992 by Dell Publishing.

The Case of the Dirty Bird is about Dunc Culpepper and best friend, Amos, who, with the help of a 150-year-old parrot, manage to uncover a ring of appliance thieves and escape a watchdog to discover who stole an antique doll.
