= Harris and Me =

1993 children's novel by Gary Paulsen

- Harris and Me first edition cover
- Author: Gary Paulsen
- Cover artist: Wendell Minor
- Language: English
- Publisher: Harcourt Children's Books
- Publication date: October 29, 1993
- Publication place: United States
- Media type: Print (hardback & paperback)
- Pages: 168 pp (first edition)
- ISBN: 978-0-15-292877-3
- OCLC: 28067113
- Dewey Decimal: 813/.54 20
- LC Class: PS3566.A834 H37 1993

Harris and Me is a children's novel written by American author Gary Paulsen. It was first published on October 29 1993. The book is composed of a collection of vignettes with a subheading to preview each chapter. Based on a 2007 online poll, the National Education Association listed the book as one of its "Teachers' Top 100 Books for Children."

== Characters ==
- The "Me" of the title is an eleven-year-old boy who narrates the story. Since "Harris and Me" is a memoir of Gary Paulsen's childhood, The "Me" is Gary Paulsen, Or least in his point of view.
- Harris Larson: A hyperactive nine-year-old boy who loves kinetic adventures.
- Knute Larson: Harris's father, a coffee-guzzling farmer who almost never speaks.
- Louie: A farmhand on the Larson's place, who sleeps above the barn. He has no teeth and swallows his food without chewing. He also has a hobby of making small wooden sculptures, inducing a wooden hand sized bust of the main character in the memoir.
- Glennis Larson: Harris's older sister, who repeatedly slaps Harris for swearing, which happens numerous times a day.
- Clair Larson: Harris's mother, the cook of the family.
- Buzzer: A lynx who was saved and raised by Louie as a pet.
- Ernie: An extremely aggressive rooster
- Vivian: A big cow who doesn't like to be touched or milked.
- Bill and Bob: The Huge Horses

Note: This is a memoir of a summer in the life of Gary Paulsen. It is said that he never went back to visit Harris.

== Motifs ==
- Home life
- Belonging
- Family
- Acceptance
- Identity

== Reception ==
Harris and Me was well received by critics, including a starred review from Booklist. Kirkus Reviews referred to Harris and Me as "an earthy, wonderfully comic piece", while Publishers Weekly called it a "warm comedy" with "a hearty helping of old-fashioned, rip-roaring entertainment".
