= Wermelskirchen =

- Town
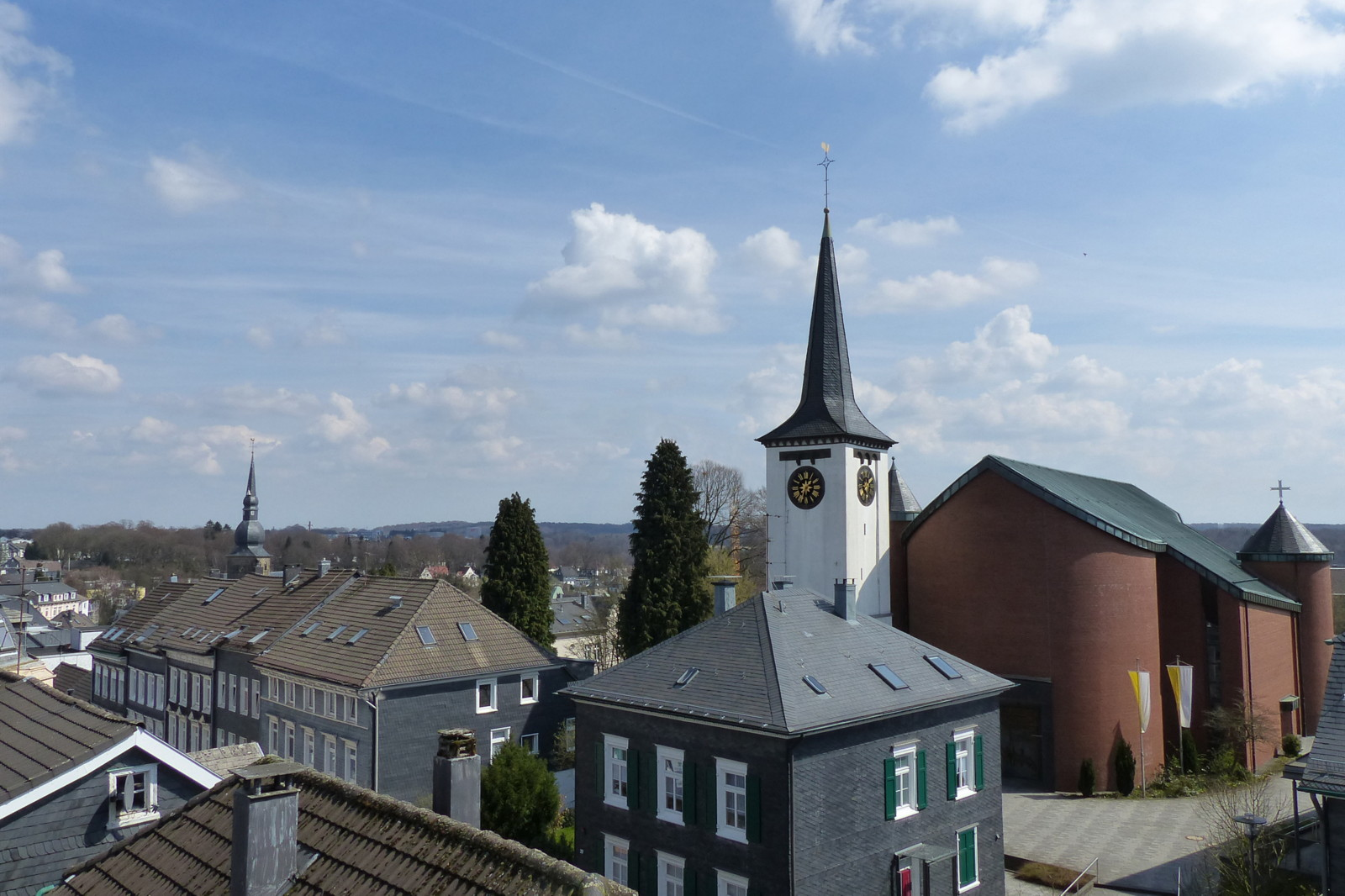
- Church of Saint Michael

- Flag Coat of arms

- Location of Wermelskirchen within Rheinisch-Bergischer Kreis district
- Interactive map of Wermelskirchen
- Location within Germany Location within North Rhine-Westphalia
- Coordinates: 51°09′N 7°13′E
- Country: Germany
- State: North Rhine-Westphalia
- Admin. region: Köln
- District: Rheinisch-Bergischer Kreis

Government
  - Mayor (2025–30): Bernd Hibst (CDU)

Area
  - Total: 74.8 km^{2} (28.9 sq mi)
- Elevation: 345 m (1,132 ft)

Population (2025-12-31)
  - Total: 34,254
  - Density: 458/km^{2} (1,190/sq mi)
- Time zone: UTC+01:00 (CET)
  - Summer (DST): UTC+02:00 (CEST)
- Postal codes: 42929
- Dialling codes: 02196; 02193 (Dabringhausen); 02174 (Bechhausen)
- Vehicle registration: GL
- Website: www.wermelskirchen.de

Wermelskirchen (German pronunciation: [ˈvɛʁml̩sˌkɪʁçn̩]; Ripuarian: Wärmelßkirrshe) is a town in the Rheinisch-Bergischer Kreis, in North Rhine-Westphalia, Germany, southeast of Remscheid. It is home to one of Europe's biggest live Christmas trees (measuring 26m).

== Geography ==
The distance to Cologne is about 35 kilometers, to Düsseldorf about 45 kilometers. The neighboring municipalities are Remscheid, Hückeswagen, Wipperfürth, Kürten, Odenthal, Burscheid and Solingen. The townscape is characterized by Altberg slate and half-timbered houses.

The city area of Wermelskirchen (area: 74,74 km²) composed out of three district's: the initial Wermelskirchen and the incorporated, previously independent municipalities, Dhünn and Dabringhausen.

== Coat of arms ==
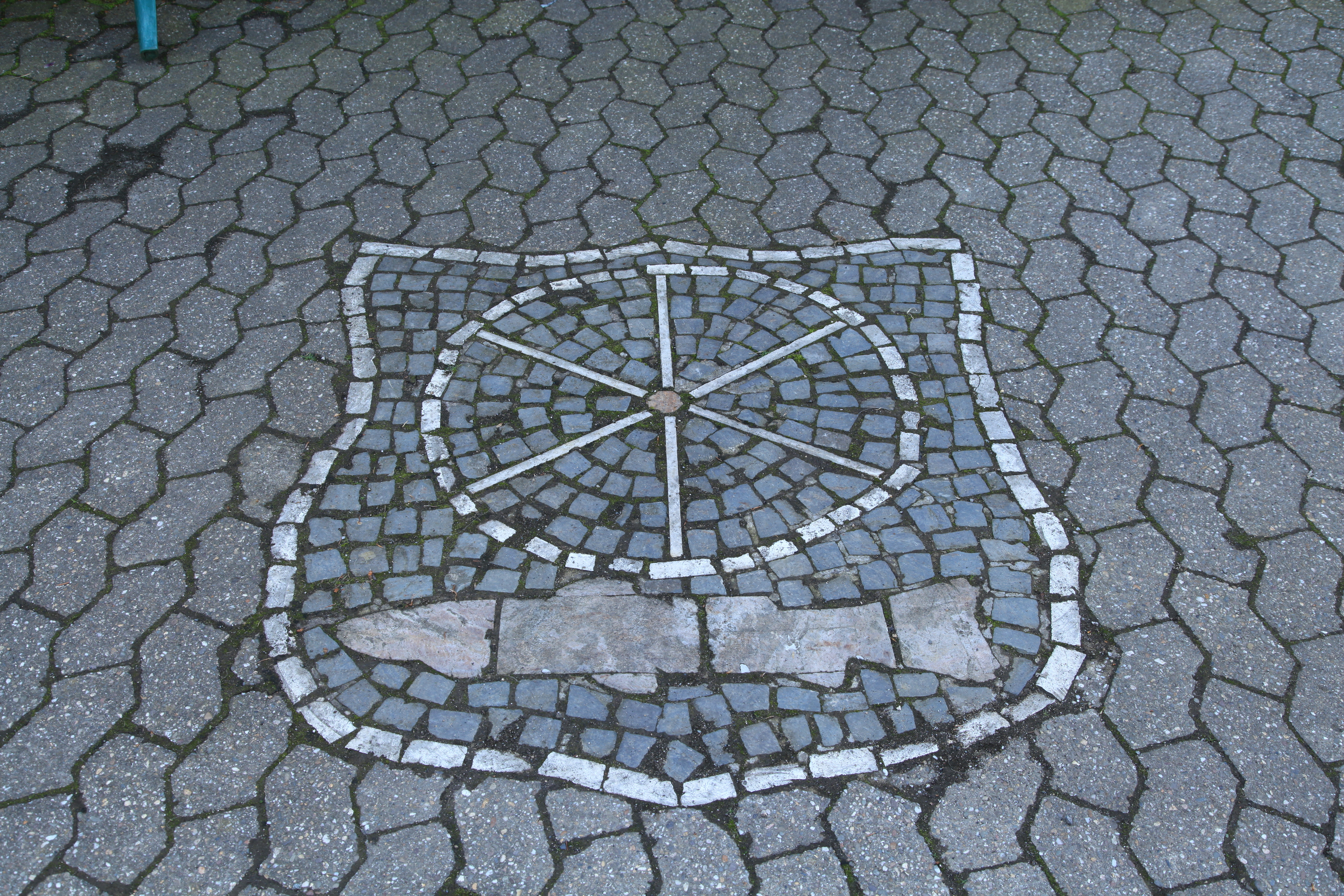
Historic marker

The coat-of-arms of the city of Wermelskirchen is a silver shield split into thirds. In the left field is an oak tree. In the right field there is a Swan and pictured in the middle field there is a church.

== History ==
From 1822 to 1945, Wermelskirchen was part of the Prussian Rhine Province.

== Population ==
Historical population

Year	Pop.	±% p.a.
1965	31,666	—
1970	33,316	+1.02%
1975	34,861	+0.91%
1980	34,744	−0.07%
1985	33,867	−0.51%
1990	35,865	+1.15%
1995	37,123	+0.69%

Year	Pop.	±% p.a.
2000	37,016	−0.06%
2005	36,588	−0.23%
2010	35,437	−0.64%
2015	34,504	−0.53%
2020	34,597	+0.05%
2025	34,254	−0.20%

Source: Landesdatabank Nordrhein-Westfalen

== Education ==
Wermelskirchen has an Evangelical, a Roman Catholic church and a Latin school.

== Economy ==
The city has the head office of OBI and the origin of the caster manufacturer TENTE.

== Twin towns – sister cities ==
Wermelskirchen is twinned with:

- Forst, Germany since 1990
- Loches, France since 1974

== Notable people ==
- Carl Leverkus (1804–1889), founder of a German chemical and pharmaceutical company and the namesake of the city of Leverkusen
- Uwe Boll (born 1965), film director and writer, restaurateur and founder of Bauhaus Restaurant chains in Canada
- Tim Schrick (born 1976), racecar driver, and television presenter
- Thomas Kleine (born 1977), footballer
- Christian Lindner (born 1979), politician and Federal Minister of Finance (2021–present)
- Marike Steinacker (born 1992), athlete, who competed in the women's discus throw event at the 2020 Tokyo Olympics and the 2024 Paris Olympics, in which she placed 6th and 4th respectively

=== Honorary citizens ===
- 1876: Ludwig von Bohlen
- 1889: Carl Leverkus
- 1895: Otto von Bismarck
- 1933: Paul von Hindenburg
