= The Fogcutters =

Huge rock funk band from Portland, Maine

The Fogcutters are a rock funk band based in Portland, Maine under the direction of trombonist John Maclaine and baritone saxophonist Brian Graham. The Fogcutters began as a 19 piece original big band but has evolved continuously since being started in 2009. The Fogcutters present original music, annual "Big Band Syndrome" and Big Band Christmas shows featuring various vocalists and songwriters.

== History ==
Since their founding in 2009, The Fogcutters began primarily playing Duke Ellington transcriptions for fun, but continues to evole into a unique original sound. The Fogcutters balance subtlety and power by playing their own unique blend of funk, rock, afro-cuban, and combining them with traditional sounds. Growing upon their continued success, The Fogcutters maintains their identity as performers of original music.

2016 - 1st original album Flotsam released. Collavorative album written with input from all members of the band. Inspired by classic and contemporary influences.

In addition to Flotsam, The Fogcutters have released two other live albums including "Big Band Syndrome Vol. 1 and Vol. 2, Live at The State Theatre" and a two Christmas EPs entitled "Jingle These Bells" and "Christmas in Maine (2023) which offers The Fogcutters take on classic Christmas songs.

Since 2010, The Fogcutters have shared the stage with many notable musicians such as The Temptations, and have created big band arrangements of Blues Traveler and Spin Doctors songs performed with John Popper and Chris Barron.

The Fogcutters were voted 2014 Best Jazz Act in New England at The New England Music Awards, and voted Best Jazz Act for 2012 & 2013 and the Best Live Act for 2013 by the Portland Phoenix Music Awards.

== Members ==
- John Maclaine – Leader, trombone

BRIAN Graham - leader, Bari sax

- Chas Lester – Vocals, percussion, beatbox
- Megan Jo Wilson – Vocals
- Matthew Day – Trumpet
- Matt Lagarde – Trumpet
- Stephen Smith – Trumpet
- Emma Stanley – Trumpet
- Dave Noyes – Trombone
- James Hebert – Trombone
- Jamie Bifulco (Colpoys) – Trombone
- Adam Montminy – Alto sax
- Mat Leighton – Alto sax
- Pat Sutor – Tenor sax, clarinet
- Tyler Card – Tenor sax, soprano sax
- Scott Ogden – Baritone sax
- Dave Henault – Drum set
- Owen Conforte – Guitar
- Rafael Freyre – Bass
- Emmett Harrity, Tyler Stanley – Piano

== Discography ==
- Big Band Syndrome Vol. 1: Live at The State Theatre (2012)
- Jingle These Bells (2012) (Christmas EP)
- Big Band Syndrome Vol. 2: Live at the State Theatre (2013)
- Flotsam (Original album by The Fogcutters) (2016)
- Christmas in Maine (2023)
