= Canyons (novel) =

1990 novel written by Gary Paulsen

- Canyons first edition cover.
- Author: Gary Paulsen
- Language: English
- Genre: Young adult fiction
- Publisher: Delacorte Press
- Publication date: August 1, 1990
- Publication place: United States
- Media type: Print (hardback & paperback)
- Pages: 184 pp (first edition)
- ISBN: 978-0-385-30153-4
- OCLC: 21036052
- LC Class: PZ7.P2843 Can 1990

Canyons is a novel written by American author Gary Paulsen, published in August 1990 by Delacorte Press. It involves two boys: one lives in modern times (Brennan), while the other is an Indian boy (Coyote Runs) living nearly two hundred years earlier.

== Plot ==
The story focuses on two boys. One boy is an Apache named Coyote Runs living during the time of the American Civil War, and the other boy is Brennan Cole living in the 20th century.

The story starts with Coyote Runs making a short narrative about his life and switches back and forth between his life and that of Brennan Cole for the first nine chapters. The switching ends when Coyote Runs is captured and shot by Cavalry soldiers during his first raid that would have, if successful, made him a man among his Apache tribe. In the remainder of the story, Brennan discovers the bullet-pierced skull of Coyote Runs while camping and becomes obsessed with it. A mysterious link connects his mind with Coyote Run's spirit. After talking to his old biology teacher, he makes a plan to return the skull to the top of a canyon – a place Coyote Runs calls his “medicine place." After a grueling run and a chase by Brennan's search party, he gradually returns Coyote Runs' skull to the medicine place, ending the bond and the novel.

== Main characters ==
- Brennan Cole – Brennan Cole lives in El Paso, Texas with his mother.
- Coyote Runs – Coyote Runs is a 14-year-old Apache Indian, who lived in the same area during the Civil War.

== Style ==
Gary Paulsen received mostly positive reviews for his original writing style used in Canyons. Publishers Weekly wrote that "readers with an appetite for Paulsen's blend of nature and mysticism will overlook Canyon's plot and find savor in its spirit."

== Reception ==
In 1991, Publishers Weekly described Canyons as "remarkable for its simple, restrained text." Kirkus Reviews noted how "the author uses poetic and semantic resonance [...] that dims the tale.

Canyons was one of six books cited by the Young Adult Library Services Association when it awarded Paulsen the 1997 Margaret Edwards Award.

== Adaptations ==
After reviewing the audio book of Canyons Peter Coyote.com said that the abridgement of canyons "does justice to the original story," and it "does not overload the listener." Publishers weekly wrote that the abridgment of Canyons "heightens the dramatic effect of the tale."
