= Rifleman (disambiguation) =

A rifleman is a soldier in a rifle unit of infantry.

Rifleman may also refer to:

- A member of the Rifle Brigade (Prince Consort's Own) or any of the brigades and regiments that derive their heritage from the original unit (see The Rifles)
- Rifleman (bird) or Titipounamu (Acanthisitta chloris), a New Zealand bird
- The Rifleman, a U.S. television program starring Chuck Connors
- The Rifleman, a 2019 Latvian war drama
- ST Rifleman, a British tugboat
- Rifleman (arcade game), a 1967 Sega arcade game
- Chuck Person (born 1964), American basketball player and coach
