= The River (novel) =

1991 novel by Gary Paulsen

- First edition
- Author: Gary Paulsen
- Cover artist: None
- Language: English
- Series: Brian's Saga
- Genre: Novel
- Publisher: Delacorte Press
- Publication date: June 1991
- Publication place: United States
- Media type: Print (Hardcover and Paperback)
- Pages: 130
- Preceded by: Hatchet
- Followed by: Brian's Winter

The River, also known as The Return and Hatchet: The Return, is a 1991 young adult novel by American author Gary Paulsen. It is a sequel to Hatchet (1987), and the second installment in the Hatchet series. The book was followed by Brian's Winter (1996), which began an alternative trilogy of sequels to Hatchet that disregard The River from canon.

The 1993 reprint includes a note copied from Paulsen's handwriting, explaining about the survival aspects of The River that "like all my books it is based on things that happened to me."

== Plot ==
Brian Robeson, a 13-year-old boy who spent 54 days surviving alone in the Canadian wilderness the previous summer, is hired by the government to again live in the woods and survive using only his wits so the military can learn his survival techniques. Though reluctant at first, Brian eventually agrees. This time, Brian sets out for a remote Canadian location accompanied by Derek Holtzer, a government psychologist.

Though the government stipulated the duo take emergency supplies, Brian insists they abandon everything but a knife and an emergency radio, saying that it would be impossible to eat bugs and sleep in the rain when a tent and prepared food is within reach. During their stay, things take a grim turn when their camp is struck by lightning, which knocks Derek into a coma and destroys the radio. Knowing that Derek will die of dehydration long before anyone finds them, Brian builds a raft in a desperate bid to navigate down the unknown river to Brannock's Trading Post, the nearest inhabited point, for emergency aid. The biggest problem is the trading post is 100 miles (160 km) downriver. Despite rapids, the craft's unwieldiness, exhaustion, and a lack of geographical knowledge, they finally reach the trading post and Derek survives. After the two get back home, Derek buys Brian a canoe named The Raft as a thank you present.

== Reception ==
The River received generally positive reviews. Publishers Weekly said that the book was "as riveting as its predecessor", with praise for Paulsen's writing and Brian's character development. Kirkus Reviews called the book "perfunctory in design but vividly written" and considered it a worthy sequel to Hatchet.
