= Dogsong =

1985 novel by Gary Paulsen

- Author: Gary Paulsen
- Illustrator: Ruth Paulsen
- Language: English
- Genre: Novel
- Publisher: Bradbury
- Publication date: April 1985
- Publication place: United States
- English publication date: 1985
- Media type: Print (Hardback)
- Pages: 177 pp
- ISBN: 0-02-770180-8
- OCLC: 11210809
- LC Class: PZ7.P2843 Do 1985

Dogsong is a young adult novel by American author Gary Paulsen, published in April 1985 by Bradbury.

Dogsong was an 1986 Newbery Honor book.

== Plot ==
Inspired by the Eskimo shaman Oogruk, Russel Susskit takes a dog team and sled to escape the modern ways of his village and to find his own "song" of himself, hating the sound of snowmobiles and his father's coughing in the morning. He travels across ice floes, tundra, and mountains, haunted along the way by a dream of a long-ago self whose adventures parallel his own. Reality melds with the dream when he finds an Eskimo girl named Nancy, who has run away from her village after becoming pregnant. Circumstances require him to provide for himself and the girl in a harsh and unforgiving land. Russel sets out looking for food, for Nancy and himself, after Nancy gives birth to a still-born baby.

== Characters ==
- Russel Susskit: An Eskimo boy who uses dogs to travel in his journey to search for answers about his spirit.
- Nancy: A pregnant girl who Russel finds in the snowy wilderness. Russel rescues her and keeps her company. She also accompanies him in feeding the dogs.
- Oogruk: An old elder and Eskimo shaman. Russel spends a lot of time with Oogruk, as he is disturbed about the changes that are occurring in his village. He also talks to Russel about his past and how each person had a song with which they can identify themselves. He lets Russel know to bring him to the frozen ocean, where he wants to bid farewell as his resting spot for the end of his life.
- Russel's father: The father of the main protagonist Russel. His wife leaves him for a trapper and most of Russel's life is spent with his father. He informs Russel to go and speak to Oogruk for advice during his journey.
- Dogs: Strong caring dogs, who guide Russel throughout the story.

== See also ==
- Children's Literature
