= The Tent (film) =

- Directed by: Kyle Couch
- Written by: Kyle Couch
- Produced by: Tim Kaiser
- Starring: Tim Kaiser; Lulu Dahl
- Cinematography: Robert Skates
- Edited by: David Peterson
- Music by: Pierre Vaucher
- Production company: 1926 Pictures
- Distributed by: Red Square Film
- Release date: 5 May 2020
- Running time: 85 minutes
- Country: United States
- Language: English

The Tent is a 2020 American thriller film directed by Kyle Couch, starring Tim Kaiser and Lulu Dahl.

== Cast ==
- Tim Kaiser as David
- Lulu Dahl as Mary
- Shelby Bradley as Anne
- Christine Marie as Christine
- Jeannine Thompson as Grace
- Jeff Kaiser as Jesse
- Kyle Couch as Gabriel

== Reception ==
Bobby LePire of Film Threat gave the film a score of 9/10 and wrote that while the film has "a few minor structural issues", Kaiser and Dahl are "perfectly matched to each other and deliver fantastic performances", the cinematography is "excellent", the sound design is "some of the best".

Jeremy Dick of MovieWeb wrote that while the film is "light on fright", it is "heavy on emotion", and called the performances "excellent".

Joel Harley of Starburst rated the film 3 stars out of 5 and wrote that while the film is "shabby and unassuming", it is "gets the job done."
