= Guts: The True Stories Behind Hatchet and the Brian Books =

Book by Gary Paulsen

Guts: The True Stories Behind Hatchet and the Brian's Books
- Title book
- Author: Gary Paulsen
- Audio read by: Patrick Lawlor
- Cover artist: Saho Fujii
- Language: English
- Genre: Non-fiction Adventure Auto-Biography
- Publisher: Delacorte Press
- Publication date: 2001
- Publication place: United States
- Media type: Hardcover and Paperback
- Pages: 148 pp
- ISBN: 0-385-32650-5

Guts: The True Stories Behind Hatchet and the Brian Books is a non-fiction book by American author Gary Paulsen, published on January 23, 2001 by Delacorte Books. It is about some of Paulsen's life adventures, including dog sledding in blizzards, being in a plane stalling in the air in the Arctic, watching as a little boy gets stabbed to death by a young buck, watching as a boy dies from a heart attack, dog sled races, and moose attacks. He discusses the inspirations of his life and the way they helped to create events for his character Brian Robeson in his Brian's Saga series.

== Plot ==
When Paulsen was a child, his parents didn't have enough money for food and school supplies, so he worked as a pinsetter in a bowling alley for money and hunted rabbits, ducks, and grouse for food. He worked as one of two EMT volunteers in a 1000 square mile radius, using an old gifted ambulance from a city that had recently bought new ones. He tells of how he was attacked by many moose, mosquitoes, and deer flies. He says he once was stranded while on a work trip because of a flipped canoe, losing essentials.

== Reception ==
Guts was well received by critics, including a starred review from Publishers Weekly.

Booklist's Kelly Milner Halls noted that "readers squeamish about hunting or the death of animals will find many of the stories disturbing [...], but those who embrace the sport or have enjoyed the novels will see in Paulsen a responsible role model--a man who respects life and death as equal partners." Similarly, School Library Journal's Cary Frostick discussed Paulsen's descriptions of hunting, including that Paulsen doesn't spare any "gory details" and highlighted Paulsen's "mixed feelings about ending the animals' lives".

Frostick also reviewed the audiobook, writing, "Patrick Lawlor's reading is true to the uninterrupted style in which each chapter is written. It is much like listening to one's grandfather reminisce about his youth."
