= Gary Paulsen =

American writer (1939–2021)

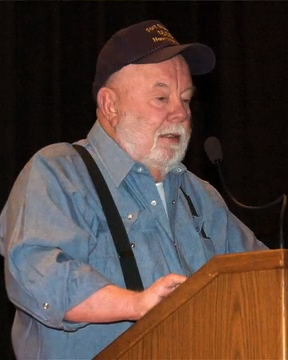
- Paulsen in 2012
- Born: Gary James Paulsen; May 17, 1939; Minneapolis, Minnesota, U.S.
- Died: October 13, 2021 (aged 82); Tularosa, New Mexico, U.S.
- Occupation: Author
- Spouse: Ruth Wright Paulsen
- Children: 3
- Writing career
- Period: 1966–2021
- Genres: Children's fiction, young adult fiction, adventure novels, nonfiction
- Subjects: Adventure memoirs, sports
- Notable works: Hatchet; The River; Brian's Winter; Dogsong; Woodsong; Winterdance; The Winter Room; Harris and Me
- Notable awards: Margaret Edwards Award; 1997
- Website: www.penguinrandomhouse.com/authors/23384/gary-paulsen/

Gary James Paulsen (May 17, 1939 – October 13, 2021) was an American writer of children's and young adult fiction, best known for coming-of-age stories about the wilderness. He was the author of more than 200 books and wrote more than 200 magazine articles and short stories, and several plays, all primarily for teenagers. He won the Margaret Edwards Award from the American Library Association in 1997 for his lifetime contribution in writing for teens.

== Early life ==
Gary Paulsen was born on May 17, 1939, in Minneapolis to Oscar Paulsen and Eunice Paulsen, née Moen. His father was a career Army officer who departed soon after Gary's birth to join General Patton's staff. Gary next saw his father at age seven when he and his mother sailed to the Philippines to join him at his army base. He and his mother lived in Thief River Falls, Minnesota. When Gary was four, his mother took him to live in Chicago. Before World War II ended, she sent him to live with relatives on a farm for a year.

He wrote some fragmented autobiographical works describing his early life, such as Eastern Sun, Winter Moon: An Autobiographical Odyssey. The book, which is written in the first person, begins when he was about five, living in Chicago with his mother. Paulsen described several traumatic occurrences that transpired during the three years that are chronicled by the book. For example, one day while his mother was napping, Gary sneaked outside to play. There, a vagrant snatched him and attempted to molest him, but his mother suddenly appeared on the scene and beat the man. Paulsen reported an affair his mother had in Eastern Sun. He also wrote about his mother's alcoholism.

When World War II ended, Gary's father sent for him and his mother to join him in the Philippines, where he was stationed. A great part of the book Eastern Sun, Winter Moon is dedicated to the voyage by naval vessels (liberty ships) to the Philippines. During the trip, Gary witnessed a plane crash. He, his mother, and the people who were also being transported on this liberty ship looked on as many of the airplane's passengers were killed or maimed by the sharks that would follow the ship consuming waste. His mother, the only woman aboard, helped the ship's corpsman care for the surviving victims. After arriving in Hawai'i, according to Paulsen, his mother began an affair with the corpsman.

In elementary school, he was quite deficient in literacy class and struggled with literacy. The accounts in Eastern Sun ended when Gary and his mother left Manila.

Bits and pieces of Gary's adolescence can be cobbled together in Guts: The True Stories Behind Hatchet and the Brian Books. In that book, Paulsen discusses how he survived between the ages of twelve and fourteen back in Minnesota. He barely mentions his parents except to say that they were too busy being drunk to stock the refrigerator. He worked several jobs during this time, including setting pins at a bowling alley, delivering newspapers, and working as a farmhand. He bought his own school supplies and a .22 caliber single-shot rifle, which he used to hunt for sustenance. Eventually, he gave up the rifle and manufactured his own bow and arrows, which he used to hunt deer.

Paulsen graduated from Lincoln High School in Thief River Falls, Minnesota. He attended Bemidji State University, but dropped out. He served in the U.S. Army between 1959 and 1962, attaining the rank of sergeant while working with missiles. His army service brought him to New Mexico for a while, a place in which he later chose to settle.

== Careers ==
Much of what is known about Paulsen's life was revealed in the prologues and epilogues of his own books. In The Quilt, one of a series of three novels based on summers spent with his grandmother, Paulsen recounts what a tremendous influence his grandmother had on him. It is difficult to say how factual an autobiography The Quilt is intended to be, as Paulsen is supposed to have been six years old in this story and yet he made references to events found in Eastern Sun, which is supposed to have been set later. He also refers to himself, in this book, in the third person and only as "the boy".

Much of Paulsen's work features the outdoors and highlights the importance of nature. He often uses "coming of age" themes in his novels, where a character masters the art of survival in isolation as a "(w)rite" of passage to manhood and maturity. He was critical of technology and has been called a Luddite.

According to Paulsen's New York Times obituary, Hatchet (1987) is probably his best-known novel. Other well-known works include Dogsong (1985) and The Winter Room (1989).

The American Library Association (ALA) Margaret Edwards Award recognizes one writer and a particular body of work for a "significant and lasting contribution to young adult literature". Paulsen won the annual award in 1997, when the panel cited six books published from 1983 to 1990: Dancing Carl, Hatchet (first in the series), The Crossing, The Winter Room, Canyons, and Woodsong. The citation noted that "the theme of survival is woven throughout, whether it is living through a plane crash or living in an abusive, alcoholic household" and emphasized Hatchet in particular for "encompassing a survival theme in all its aspects, physical as well as psychological".

Three of Paulsen's books were runners-up for the Newbery Medal, the premier ALA annual book award for children's literature: Dogsong, Hatchet, and The Winter Room.

== Personal life ==
Paulsen's first two marriages ended in divorce. In the mid-1960s, Paulsen moved to Taos, New Mexico, where he met his third wife, Ruth Wright, an illustrator of children's books, whom he married in 1971. Paulsen had two children from his first marriage, Lynn and Lance, and a son Jim from his third marriage with Ruth Wright. Although a successful author, Paulsen said he chose to live modestly. He lived throughout New Mexico, including in Santa Fe, La Luz, White Oaks, and Tularosa. He also spent time living on a houseboat on the Pacific Ocean.

In 1983, Paulsen entered the 1,150-mile (1,850 km) Iditarod Trail Sled Dog Race, and placed 41st out of 54 finishers, with an official time of 17 days, 12 hours, 38 minutes, and 38 seconds. In 1990, suffering from heart disease, Paulsen decided to give up dog sledding, which he described as the most difficult decision he had ever made. Paulsen spent more than a decade sailing the Pacific before getting back into dog sledding in 2003. According to his keynote speech on October 13, 2007, at the Sinclair Lewis writing conference in Sauk Centre, Minnesota, he still intended to compete in the Iditarod. He is listed in the "Withdrawn/Scratched" section of both the 1985 and the 2006 Iditarod. Paulsen was an outdoorsman (a hunter and trapper), who maintained a 40-acre (160,000 m^{2}) parcel of land north of Willow, Alaska, where he bred and trained sled dogs for the Iditarod.

== Death ==
Paulsen died from cardiac arrest at his home in Tularosa, New Mexico, on October 13, 2021, aged 82.
