= Ramona the Brave =

1975 novel by Beverly Cleary

- First edition
- Author: Beverly Cleary
- Illustrator: Alan Tiegreen (first edition); Tracy Dockray (second edition); Jacqueline Rogers (third edition)
- Language: English
- Series: Ramona
- Genre: Children's novel
- Published: 1975 (William Morrow)
- Publication place: United States
- Media type: Print (paperback)
- Pages: 189 pp
- ISBN: 0-688-22015-0
- Preceded by: Ramona the Pest
- Followed by: Ramona and Her Father

Ramona the Brave is a 1975 children's novel written by American author Beverly Cleary. It is the third book in the Ramona series, following Beezus and Ramona (1955) and Ramona the Pest (1968). The story follows Ramona Quimby and her classmates (some of whom were in her kindergarten class for the previous year) going into first grade. Ramona the Brave was first published in 1975 with illustrations by Alan Tiegreen, succeeding the late Louis Darling.

== Plot summary ==
Ramona Quimby has spent most of the summer with her friend Howie Kemp, pounding old bricks into dust in a game called Brick Factory. Brick Factory makes Ramona feel powerful, which does not happen very often since she is the youngest in her family. Longing to be brave and grown-up, Ramona sticks up for her older sister, Beatrice "Beezus" Quimby, when some boys tease about her nickname (calling her "Beezus Jesus" or "Jesus Beezus") by trying to protect her. However, Ramona is crushed to realize that instead of considering her a hero, Beezus is embarrassed, and becomes angrier at Ramona for defending her than she is at the boys for teasing her.

By the end of summer, Mother gets a part-time job and some workmen cut a hole in their house to add an extra bedroom (especially since Beezus and Ramona would bicker often when they shared a room). Beezus and Ramona are going to take turns using the new room (for half a year), and Ramona gets to be first, though she finds it frightening to go to sleep in the new room alone.

When first grade starts, Ramona begins learning to read. However, she is convinced that her teacher, Mrs. Griggs, dislikes her. This feeling is worsened by Ramona's tendency to get into trouble. One day when her class is making paper-bag owls for Parents' Night, Ramona sees Susan Kushner, her kindergarten nemesis, copying Ramona's owl. Mrs. Griggs sees Susan's owl first and shows it off to the class. Ramona is outraged at Susan for copying, feeling it makes her own owl less special, and destroys both owls. The next day, Ramona is forced to apologize to Susan in front of the whole class, but things improve when the class is nice to her afterward.

One day on her way to school a big dog comes after Ramona, so she takes off her shoe and throws it at him. The dog picks up her shoe and carries it away, forcing Ramona to go shoeless to school. That turns out to be the morning Mrs. Griggs finally chooses Ramona to lead the morning flag salute, and Mrs. Griggs discovers that Ramona is only wearing one shoe. During recess, she uses toilet paper and staples to build a temporary shoe. Ramona uses her ingenuity to deal with the situation, and when her shoe is returned, the school secretary compliments her bravery, resulting in her nickname "the Brave".

== Reception ==
Kirkus Reviews praised the novel in a 1975 review, stating that the writing was "amusing, sound, empathic. . . as always." As of 2014, 97 editions of Ramona the Brave had been published in 6 languages.

Awards
Preceded by The Ghost of Saturday Night	Mark Twain Award; 1978	Succeeded by Champion of Merrimack County
