= Ramona Forever =

1984 children's novel by Beverly Cleary

- First edition
- Author: Beverly Cleary
- Illustrator: Alan Tiegreen (first edition); Tracy Dockray (second edition); Jacqueline Rogers (third edition)
- Language: English
- Series: Ramona
- Genre: Children's novel
- Publisher: William Morrow
- Publication date: 1984
- Publication place: United States
- Media type: Print (Hardback and Paperback)
- Preceded by: Ramona Quimby, Age 8
- Followed by: Ramona's World

Ramona Forever is a 1984 children's novel written by American author Beverly Cleary. It is the seventh book in the Ramona series, following Ramona Quimby, Age 8 (1981). The book continues the story of Ramona, her older sister, Beezus, and their family. Ramona and Beezus are finally old enough to stay home together, and they work hard to get along while coping with growing up. Meanwhile, Mrs. Quimby is expecting a baby, and Aunt Bea gets engaged. It was originally published with illustrations by Alan Tiegreen.

== Plot summary ==
Ramona Quimby is curious to meet her friend Howie Kemp's uncle, Uncle Hobart, who has just returned from Saudi Arabia. She meets him one day after school at the Kemps' house, but when he teases her about being Howie's girlfriend, she quickly decides she dislikes him. Hobart gives Howie a unicycle, and Howie's younger sister Willa Jean an accordion. Willa Jean breaks the accordion before Ramona has the chance to stop her, but Mrs. Kemp, their grandmother, punishes Ramona anyway. Hurt and angry, Ramona tells her parents that she no longer wants to go to the Kemps' house after school, and that Mrs. Kemp singles her out. When Beezus agrees that Mrs. Kemp dislikes them both, the sisters convince their parents to let them stay home after school for one week to see how it goes.

The sisters get along at first, but when Beezus refuses to let Ramona go out and ride Howie's bike, Ramona gets mad and calls her "Pizzaface". Beezus thinks this is an insult about her acne, and refuses to help Ramona after she scrapes her knee. The next day, they find their cat, Picky-Picky, dead in the basement. They bury Picky-Picky, hold a funeral for him, and forgive each other for the fight. When their parents return home, they decide the sisters are responsible enough to take care of themselves; they then announce that Mrs. Quimby is pregnant, leaving Beezus thrilled and Ramona with mixed feelings.

As summer arrives, Mr. Quimby is almost finished with college and hopes to get a teaching job in the area, but when the only job he is offered turns out to be in rural Oregon (which would force the family to move), he instead finds work managing one of the Shop-Rite supermarkets in Portland. Meanwhile, Ramona's Aunt Beatrice gets engaged to Uncle Hobart. At first, they do not plan to have a wedding, but when Beezus insists, the group plans a wedding in only two weeks. When the wedding arrives, the wedding ring is stitched too tightly onto the pillow, and goes flying when Howie's father yanks on it; Ramona sees the ring on the heel of Aunt Beatrice's shoe, retrieves it and saves the wedding.

Not long after the wedding, Mrs. Quimby gives birth to her youngest daughter, Roberta Day Quimby. While Beezus is able to visit their mother and Roberta, Ramona is too young to visit the maternity ward. Later, though, when Mrs. Quimby returns from the hospital, Ramona finally meets Roberta. On the car ride home, she realizes that no matter how big or challenging the coming changes are, she's "winning at growing up".

== Critical reception ==
Kirkus Reviews gave the book a starred review, for "books of remarkable merit", saying, "It's a measure of Cleary's talent and acumen that the Quimbys are as credible in the mid-1980s as they were in the mid-1950s."

== Characters ==
- Ramona Quimby - The novel's protagonist, who is 8 years old and in the third grade.
- Beatrice "Beezus" Quimby - Ramona's older sister, who is 13 years old and in the eighth grade.
- Robert Quimby - Ramona and Beezus' father.
- Dorothy Quimby - Ramona and Beezus' mother.
- Howard "Howie" Kemp - Ramona's friend since nursery school in Beezus and Ramona who becomes her cousin-in-law.
- Aunt Beatrice "Aunt Bea" - The girls' aunt and Dorothy's sister. First introduced in Beezus and Ramona, she is a third-grade teacher and marries Hobart.
- Hobart Kemp - Howie's rich uncle who marries Aunt Bea and becomes the girls' uncle in the ninth chapter.
- Willa Jean Kemp - Howie's messy little sister.
- Picky-Picky - The Quimbys' cat who dies at the age of 10 in the fourth chapter.
- Roberta Quimby - The girls' new baby sister who is born in the last chapter.

== Adaptations, editions ==
Elements from the book's story were adapted in the film Ramona and Beezus (2010), starring Joey King as Ramona and Selena Gomez as Beezus. It was released on July 23, 2010.

Ramona Forever is available as an audiobook in cassette, CD and eAudiobook from Random House/Listening Library. Braille and large print versions are available from Dell, and e-Books through HarperCollins. As of 2010, 109 editions of the book had been published in 9 languages.
