= Ramona Quimby, Age 8 =

1981 novel by Beverly Cleary

- First edition
- Author: Beverly Cleary
- Illustrator: Alan Tiegreen (first edition); Tracy Dockray (second edition); Jacqueline Rogers (third edition)
- Language: English
- Series: Ramona
- Genre: Children's novel
- Publisher: William Morrow
- Publication date: 1981
- Publication place: United States
- Media type: Print (Hardback & Paperback)
- Preceded by: Ramona and Her Mother
- Followed by: Ramona Forever

Ramona Quimby, Age 8 is a 1981 children's novel by American author Beverly Cleary. It is the sixth installment in the Ramona series, following Ramona and Her Mother (1979). In the story, Ramona Quimby is in the third grade, now at a new school, and making some new friends. With Beezus in junior high and Mr. Quimby going back to college, Ramona feels the pressure with everyone counting on her to manage at school by herself and get along with Willa Jean after school every day. Ramona Quimby, Age 8 was named a Newbery Honor book in 1982.

== Plot summary ==
Ramona Quimby is beginning life in third grade. The schools in the Quimbys' neighborhood have been reorganized, and now she gets to ride the bus to Cedarhurst Primary, where she and her fellow third graders will be the biggest kids in the school. Ramona is happy about the changes until a boy on the bus steals her new eraser, but she rises to the challenge and ends up deciding that "Yard Ape" (the boy who stole her eraser, known as "Danny" to adults) may not be so bad, after all.

Ramona feels the best part of being in third grade is Sustained Silent Reading. When Ramona cracks a hard boiled egg on her head at lunch—and finds out her mother forgot to boil it—she ends up in the secretary's office with a head full of raw egg, where she overhears Mrs. Whaley describe her as a show-off and a nuisance. Even Yard Ape is unable to make her feel better. Things get worse when Ramona suddenly becomes ill and throws up in class, causing her mother to leave work to take her home.

Ramona also deals with her friend Howie Kemp's little sister Willa Jean. Every day after school, Howie goes outside to ride bikes with his friends, and Ramona is forced to play baby games with Willa Jean. Beezus always has homework to do as since she is in junior high school now, but Ramona isn't so lucky.

At one point, Mr. Quimby has had enough of the gloom on one Sunday and insists the family go out to eat, so they go to the Whopperburger. When they arrive, Ramona begins to dance when she accidentally bumps into an older gentleman who salutes her. Embarrassed, she goes back and rejoins her family. When the Quimbys are about to leave, they are informed by the waitress that the older gentleman had paid for their meal, saying that the Quimbys reminded him of his own family who he had not seen in some time.

== Critical reception ==
Critics welcomed Ramona Quimby, Age 8, praising Cleary's ability to convey the real concerns of ordinary children with clarity and sensitivity. The Children's Literature review says, "Kids may easily identify with Ramona's difficulties, as Cleary depicts this 'typical' white American middle-class family with warmth and interest. Cleary tackles the difficult issue of describing a happy family with grace; the Quimby family is far from perfect, and although not poverty-stricken, they are also far from rich."

Kirkus Reviews agree that readers will identify with Ramona, writing "Though the family has its money worries and its cranky days, things are never so bad that a Sunday dinner at the Whopperburger can't cheer them up... As always, Ramona's thought processes are amusing, touching, and revealing. Once more, Cleary shows us life through Ramona's eyes and shows her young readers that they are not alone."

In 1986, Choosing Books for Kids included Ramona Quimby, Age 8 in its list of Ten Books for Eights and Nines Too Good to Miss, and said "Cleary paints a real world kids can readily relate to."

== Editions ==
The book has been translated into Spanish, with the title Ramona empieza el curso. It has also been translated into Afrikaans, Bulgarian, Chinese, Dutch, German (with the title Ramona oder Eine wirklich nette Familie), Hebrew, Hungarian (with the title Ramona), Japanese, Korean, Persian, Thai, and Turkish.
