= Ramona the Pest =

1968 novel by Beverly Cleary

- First edition cover
- Author: Beverly Cleary
- Cover artist: Louis Darling
- Language: English
- Series: Ramona (novel series)
- Genre: Children's novel
- Publisher: William Morrow
- Publication date: 1968
- Publication place: United States
- Media type: Print (Paperback) Hardback
- Pages: 211
- Preceded by: Beezus and Ramona
- Followed by: Ramona the Brave

Ramona the Pest is a 1968 children's novel by American author Beverly Cleary. It is the second book of the Ramona series, and the first to focus on Ramona Quimby as the protagonist. This children's book chronicles the adventures of Ramona's first few months at kindergarten. The book's title is derived from the characterization of Ramona as a "pest" by many, including her older sister Beezus. Ramona the Pest was first published in 1968 and featured illustrations by Louis Darling. Other artists have since illustrated subsequent editions of Ramona the Pest, including Alan Tiegreen, Tracy Dockray, and Jacqueline Rogers.

== Plot summary ==
One year after the events of Beezus and Ramona, Ramona Quimby is excited because she is starting kindergarten, but trouble still seems to follow her. Although Ramona does not mean to be a pest, she still manages to create trouble without trying to. Miss Binney is her teacher, and Ramona likes her a lot, especially when she praises Ramona's interesting drawing and nice fat letter 'Q's. There is a girl in her class named Susan with long, springy curls. Ramona really wants to pull on one of those curls and watch it bounce back and forth, but when she finally does she gets sent to the bench until recess is over. Another new person in her class is Davy. Ramona chases him at recess, trying to catch and kiss him, which she finally manages to accomplish when she participates in the Halloween parade when she is "the baddest witch in the world."

Ramona tries to do her best in kindergarten but finds it difficult, especially during seat work, when she has to sit quietly and keep her eyes on her own work. She is too interested in seeing what everyone else is doing. Still, kindergarten is going well until the day the substitute teacher arrives. Ramona refuses to go to class without Miss Binney, so she hides behind the trash cans with Ribsy the dog. When Beezus finds her and takes her to the principal's office, Ramona is forced to go to class anyway.

Then one day, Susan calls Ramona a "pest", Ramona retaliates by pulling Susan's curls, and Miss Binney sends her home until she can behave herself. Ramona decides that Miss Binney does not like her anymore, and she refuses to go back. Nothing anyone says to her can change her mind until she gets a letter from Miss Binney returning the tooth she lost at school the day she was suspended. Ramona decides Miss Binney must like her and is happy to return to kindergarten.

== Critical reception ==
Ramona the Pest was well received. A 1968 review Kirkus Reviews praised the book, writing "Ramona's going to school. . . who needs a review? … The conjunction of belly laugh and basal emotion puts this on a par with the best in the series." Common Sense Media writes that "the sparkling writing style and humorous story line are both engaging and highly appealing." Choosing Books for Kids says that in Ramona the Pest "Cleary rings true and touches sixes and sevens feelings and funny bones." It includes the book on its list of Ten Books Every Six- and Seven-Year-Old Should Know.

Other reviewers noted that the appeal of the book is not limited to any particular age group. "Ramona's determination to be chosen as the wake-up fairy at nap time on her first day of kindergarten… contains levels of humour for older children, from the faintly ludicrous physical situation through to the ironic implications as to what is going on in Ramona's mind; and it brings a smile to the face of all those teachers who have encountered a Ramona." Recommending the book for beginning readers, Great Books for Girls calls it, "A popular read-aloud for younger children, too." Reviewer Anita Silvey praises Cleary's ability to write books "that can be enjoyed by even the youngest readers yet are so sharply observed that readers of all ages respond to the material." And according to author and children's book reviewer Rob Reid, "Her year in kindergarten makes one of the funniest books on the market."

In 2012 it was ranked number 24 on a list of the top 100 children's novels published by School Library Journal.

== Editions ==
Ramona the Pest was released as an audiobook in cassette, CD and eAudiobook from HarperCollins Audio in 2010, and as an audiobook on CD from Princeton, N.J.: Recording for the Blind & Dyslexic in 2008. Large print books were published through American Printing House for the Blind, braille editions are available at Seedlings Braille Books for Children, and e-Books through HarperCollins e-books. As of 2010, 140 editions of Ramona the Pest had been published in 9 languages.
