= Tracy Dockray =

American artist

Tracy Dockray is an American artist and illustrator of children’s books. She is best known for illustrating the HarperCollins editions of Beverly Cleary’s Ramona series and The Mouse and the Motorcycle series, as well as the Fix-It Friends chapter book series by Nicole C. Kear.

Over the course of her career, Dockray has illustrated more than 25 books. Her picture book The Lost and Found Pony received a Gold Medal in the 2011 Moonbeam Children’s Book Awards in the Picture Book (4–8 Year Old) category. Her book Bright Dreams was selected as an Outstanding Science Trade Book by the National Science Teaching Association and the Children’s Book Council.

== Career ==
Dockray’s illustration work includes children’s titles such as Ellen Tebbits, Izzy and Oscar, and Stay!, among others. She is recognized for her contributions to children’s literature and for her ability to create expressive visual interpretations that support narrative storytelling.

== Community involvement and leadership ==
In addition to her artistic career, Dockray is active in nonprofit and arts organizations. She serves on the Board of Directors of Literacy Inc. (LINC), a New York–based nonprofit dedicated to promoting literacy and access to books for children.

== Selected bibliography ==
- Fix-It Friends series by Nicole C. Kear
- Ellen Tebbits by Beverly Cleary
- Izzy and Oscar by Allison Estes
- Stay! by Lois Lowry
- The Tushy Book by Fran Manushkin
- The Lost and Found Pony by Tracy Dockray
- Bright Dreams by Tracy Dockray

== Information ==
Dockray has participated in the Learning Inc. Literacy Programs as well as the Learning Leaders Author's Read-aloud Program that is located in New York. She has contributed to the annual Children's Literary Event that is located at the Bethlehem Center in Dallas, Texas. Dockray is a member of the Society of Illustrators. Tracy Dockray is the current president of The Salmagundi Club, a 156 year old 501c3 arts club located in New York City. https://salmagundi.org/2024-2026-governance/

== Bibliography ==
- Fix-It Friends books 1-4 by Nicole C. Kear
- Izzy and Oscar by Allison Estes
- Stay! by Lois Lowry
- The Scare in My Hair by Tracy Dockray
- The Lost and Found Pony by Tracy Dockray
- Sweet Baby Feet by Margaret O'Hair
- The Tushy Book by Fran Manushkin
- Jammy Dance by Rebecca Janni
- Hear That? by Tama Janowitz
- My Bunny Diary by Tracy Dockray
- Delia at the Delano by Bob Morris
- Grimm's Grimmest by Tracy Dockray

Books by Beverly Cleary

- Beezus and Ramona
- Ramona the Pest
- Ramona the Brave
- Ramona and Her Father
- Ramona and Her Mother
- Ramona Quimby, Age 8
- Ramona Forever
- Ramona's World
- The Mouse and the Motorcycle
- Runaway Ralph
- Ralph S. Mouse
- Henry Huggins
- Henry and Beezus
- Henry and Ribsy
- Henry and the Paper Route
- Henry and the Clubhouse
- Mitch and Amy
- Muggie Maggie
- Socks
- Ribsy
- Emily's Runaway Imagination
- Ellen Tebbits
- Otis Spofford
