= Ramona (novel series) =

Novel series by Beverly Cleary

Ramona Book Series
- Author: Beverly Cleary
- Illustrator: Tracy Dockray/Louis Darling/Alan Tiegreen
- Series: Ramona Quimby Series
- Genre: Realistic Fiction
- Publisher: HarperCollins

The Ramona books are a series of eight children's novels by Beverly Cleary that center on Ramona Quimby, her family and friends. The first book, Beezus and Ramona, appeared in 1955. The final book, Ramona's World, was published in 1999. Two books in the series were named Newbery Honor books, Ramona and Her Father and Ramona Quimby, Age 8. Ramona and Her Mother received the National Book Award. Sometimes known as the Beezus and Ramona series, as of 2012, the books were being marketed by HarperCollins as "The Complete Ramona Collection".

== Background ==
The Ramona books grew out of Cleary's earlier Henry Huggins series and take place in the same neighborhood. In the Henry Huggins books Beezus was one of Henry's friends, and her younger sister Ramona was generally a pest to Henry, Beezus and the other children.

It occurred to Cleary (while writing Henry Huggins) that all of the characters she had created thus far had no brothers or sisters. "Someone should have a sibling," she wrote in My Own Two Feet, "so I tossed in a little sister to explain Beezus's nickname. When it came time to name the sister, I overheard a neighbor call out to another whose name was Ramona. I wrote in "Ramona," made several references to her, gave her one brief scene, and thought that was the end of her. Little did I dream, to use a trite expression from books of my childhood, that she would take over books of her own."

In 1955, after finishing three Henry books, Cleary wrote Beezus and Ramona, a novel in which Beezus was the central character. The plot revolved around fourth grade Beezus' frustrations with her younger sister. Then in 1968, having concluded the Henry Huggins series, Cleary returned to focus on the two sisters in Ramona the Pest. It became the foundation book of the Ramona series. As publisher, writer and reviewer Anita Silvey says, "It was almost inevitable that Cleary would publish a series of books about this boisterous yet appealing character."

Ramona the Pest, like the remaining books in the series, is written from Ramona's point of view. In Ramona the Pest Ramona enters kindergarten. The succeeding books follow her as she grows up and advances through school, usually at the rate of one grade over two books. Written from the 1950s through the 1990s, dates aren't mentioned in the books, and the children are designed to appeal to real children in any time period. The last Ramona book, Ramona's World, was published in 1999, 15 years after the previous one.

== Series ==
Beezus and Ramona (1955)
This is the only book in the series written from older sister Beezus' point of view. In the book, Beezus is struggling with her feelings for her annoying younger sister Ramona. Ramona exasperates Beezus with her high spirits and wild imagination. Ramona scribbles all over a library book, gets Ribsy locked in the bathroom, and disrupts Beezus' art class. Finally Beezus realizes it is possible to love her sister, even when she doesn't always like her.
Ramona the Pest (1968)
Ramona and her neighbor Howie are going to kindergarten, and Miss Binney is their teacher. Ramona knows that she has been described as a pest, but she doesn't see herself that way, and in this book she tries very hard to be good and follow the rules. But sometimes she has a difficult time controlling herself, and one day she gets sent home from school for pulling her classmate's hair. Convinced her teacher doesn't like her, Ramona refuses to return until a very special letter from her teacher brings her back.
Ramona the Brave (1975)
Ramona sees herself as fearless, and is sometimes surprised to realize that others don't agree. It's the summer after kindergarten, and things are changing at the Quimby house. Ramona prepares to enter the first grade, Mrs. Quimby has a part-time job, and the family is having an extra bedroom added on to the house. Ramona bravely confronts bullies at the play ground and a mean dog on her way to school, but she isn't prepared for how scary it feels going to sleep in the brand new bedroom - alone.
Ramona and Her Father (1977)
Mr. Quimby loses his job and Ramona, now in the second grade, has some great ideas on how to earn some extra money to help out. She also decides it's time he stopped smoking, and she'll help him with that, too. By the time the church Christmas pageant arrives Ramona is feeling neglected. But the evening she was dreading turns into a success that brings the family together again. This installment was a Newbery Honor book.
Ramona and Her Mother (1979)
Still in the second grade, Ramona starts to become jealous of her mother and Beezus, because they seem to share things she can't, like sewing and cooking. She's too young to stay home alone when her parents are at work, but she's tired of going to the Kemps' after school. At home, her parents are arguing, and the girls worry about who will take care of them if they get a divorce. Eventually Ramona learns that her family has problems like everyone else's, but they still love each other. This installment received a National Book Award.
Ramona Quimby, Age 8 (1981)
In this book Ramona Quimby is learning to take responsibility for herself. She is in the third grade at a new school, and making some new friends, like "Yard Ape", who rides her bus and sits behind her in class. Her family is counting on her to manage at school by herself and get along with Willa Jean after school every day. The fact that she handles everything so well shows that Ramona is maturing. This installment was a Newbery Honor book.
Ramona Forever (1984)
In this book Ramona realizes change is inevitable, but she will always be herself. Beezus and Ramona don't like Howie's visiting Uncle Hobart, and Ramona is tired of being blamed when Willa Jean causes trouble. The sisters persuade their parents to let them stay home alone after school on a trial basis, but a misunderstanding causes trouble between them. When they find their cat Picky-Picky dead in the basement, and realize that their mother is pregnant, they learn to work together. Then Aunt Bea gets engaged to Uncle Hobart, and the family has only two weeks to plan a wedding. Finally, baby Roberta arrives, and Ramona realizes she's enjoying growing up.
Ramona's World (1999)
Ramona's world is expanding, and it doesn't revolve as much around her family as it used to. There's a new girl in fourth grade, Daisy Kidd, and she and Ramona are best friends. Mrs. Quimby is staying home again, taking care of baby Roberta, and Ramona is trying to be a good role model for her little sister, while sharing her mother's attention. Now in high school, Beezus has new friends too, and is interested in boys. Even as baby Roberta arrives, the older Quimby sisters are developing new interests.
As of 2012 the series has had three illustrators: Louis Darling, Alan Tiegreen and Tracy Dockray. The books are available separately and in boxed sets. They have also been published as audiobooks read by Stockard Channing.
The Ramona Quimby Diary
This is an activity book containing quotes and illustrations from all the Ramona books.

== Ramona's characterization ==
Librarian Kathleen Odean appreciates Ramona's fearless attitude, calling her "irrepressible" and saying "She represents the kind of girl who has not been subdued by adults or the world in general." Twentieth-Century Children's Writers cites Ramona's "spunk, her impermeable but often ambivalent bond to Beezus, and her unsurpassed creativity... (Cleary) never sacrifices Ramona's integrity or intelligence".

Part of the appeal of the series is watching Ramona grow up. Cleary's writing has been praised for its ability to show her main character maturing: "Throughout the series, Cleary depicts Ramona's emotional development as well as her adventures and misadventures." Anita Silvey calls Ramona "Cleary's most developed characterization, a child at once ordinary and extraordinary."

== Critical reception ==
Generally critics have been positive about all the Ramona books, pointing out the pleasure readers derive from watching Ramona grow up in the series. "Cleary outlines Ramona's joys and sorrows in a manner considered both poignant and hilarious" In Twentieth-Century Children's Writers, Cathryn Mercier praises Cleary's accomplishments through the series as a whole. "Through Ramona, Cleary touches young readers on an emotional level which engages and challenges, but does not overwhelm. Her ability to sustain their attention over time, from book to book, remains an accomplishment beyond evaluation."

Though now considered a standard for realistic children's fiction, Beverly Cleary's books were unique in their time. "Ramona's complexity was something unusual in children's literature. Seen through the eyes of any other character, she could be a real nuisance. But when Cleary wrote from Ramona's point of view, all of the little girl's actions made perfect sense." They are still valued today, as Julia Doubt writes, and read around the world. (Note: As of 2010, the Ramona series is available in a low of six (Beezus and Ramona), and a high of eleven (Ramona and her Father), languages.) "It is greatly significant that today the Ramona series still sells in many languages and countries across the globe - reaching out to ordinary kids (and their annoying little sisters) - and their extraordinary common misunderstandings about the world - everywhere." As The Essential Guide to Children's Books and Their Creators says, Beverly Cleary "remains one of those rare authors who are both critically acclaimed and immensely popular with young readers."

== Adaptations ==
Cleary's Ramona books have been adapted for Canadian television as Ramona. The 10-part Canadian television series starred Sarah Polley as Ramona and Lori Chodos as Beezus.

They were also made into the American movie Ramona and Beezus, released on July 23, 2010, starring Joey King as Ramona and Selena Gomez as Beezus. Although the film jumps from book to book, the plot mainly focuses on the seventh book in the series, Ramona Forever.

== Characters ==
The Quimbys and Kemps

- Ramona Geraldine Quimby: The main character. She has straight, short brown hair and an active imagination.
- Beatrice "Beezus" Quimby: Ramona's sensible, big sister, whose nickname comes from Ramona's babyhood mispronunciation of her name. She was named after Aunt Beatrice. Her middle name is Ann. While she supports and loves Ramona, she can misunderstand and be frustrated by her actions.
- Mr. Robert "Bob" Quimby: Ramona's father, who loves to draw, and remembers to bring home gummy bears and new Pink Pearl erasers for the girls. He works at sometimes unpleasant jobs to support the family, but wants to be a teacher; Ramona suggests he should be a cartoonist.
- Mrs. Dorothy Quimby (née Day): Ramona's mother, who works as a bookkeeper for a doctor. She is calm and practical, and much like Beezus in temperament, though she also has a deep and loving bond with Ramona.
- Aunt Beatrice Day-Kemp: Mrs. Quimby's sister, who is a teacher, and Beezus' favorite aunt and ideal adult. She marries Hobart Kemp later in the series. She is imaginative and carefree and tells the girls that she was remarkably like Ramona as a child. (Note that the sisters' maiden name was "Haswell" in the book Beezus and Ramona.)
- Grandpa Day: Mrs. Quimby and Aunt Bea's dad, who helps planned Aunt Bea's wedding. His wife Grandma Day died before the first book, so Ramona probably met her, but was too young to remember.
- Roberta Quimby: Beezus and Ramona's baby sister, who is born at the end of Ramona Forever. Ramona is jealous that Roberta has all her parents' attention, but at the end of "Ramona's World" learns to love her sister. Her middle name is Day.
- Picky-picky: The Quimbys' elderly cat. He usually avoids Ramona, because, as Mrs. Quimby explains, he has grown grouchy in his old age and because Ramona was rough with him when she was little. As she gets older, he comes to trust her more, even curling up on the couch with her when she's sick. He dies in Ramona Forever, and the sisters bury him.
- Howie Kemp: Ramona's friend who loves building things. He becomes Ramona's cousin-in-law in Ramona Forever when his Uncle Hobart marries her Aunt Beatrice. He never gets excited about anything, which really makes Ramona disappointed.
- Willa Jean Kemp: Howie's bratty little sister, who is frequently thrust on Ramona. People say that she is very like Ramona when she was little; however, Willa Jean does not seem to possess Ramona's imagination.
- Mrs. Kemp: Howie's mother.
- Mr. Kemp: Howie's father.
- Grandma Kemp: Howie's grandmother, who lives in the same house and watches Ramona, Howie, Willa Jean and sometimes Beezus after school.
- Uncle Hobart Kemp: Howie's uncle who marries Ramona's aunt, Beatrice. He is Mr. Kemp's younger brother. He makes his only appearance in Ramona Forever.

The Huggins family

- Henry Huggins: Beezus' red-headed friend. The Ramona series of books are a spin-off of the Henry Huggins series.
- Mr. Huggins: Henry's father.
- Mrs. Huggins: Henry's mother.
- Ribsy: Henry's dog.
- Nosy: Henry's cat.

The Kidds

- Daisy Kidd: Ramona's first friend in fourth grade. She's called 'Fence-face' by her brother because of the bands on her back teeth.
- Mrs. Kidd: Daisy's mother. She is a nice, plump woman. Ramona likes her.
- Mr. Kidd: Daisy's father.
- Jeremy Kidd: Daisy's big brother. Daisy calls him 'Germy.' Ramona once called him Prince. Beezus has a little crush on him in Ramona's World, and he returns it.
- Clawed: Jeremy Kidd's cat, a stray that he found and adopted.

Klickitat Street

- Scooter McCarthy: Henry's friend who often irritates Henry and Beezus with his upperclassman attitudes.
- Eva McCarthy: Scooter's mother.
- Robert: Henry's best friend.
- Mrs. Swink: An elderly lady who wears pants suits and calls Ramona "Juanita". Mrs. Swink was also who inspired Ramona and Howie to make tin can stilts in “Ramona and Her Father”
- The Grumbies: An older couple who doesn't like Ribsy, Henry's dog, because he likes to chase their cat.
- Mrs. Pitt: One of Ramona's neighbors who lives in front of the bus stop. She doesn't like kids who throw trash in her yard.
- Mrs. Peabody: A lady who was Henry's neighbor; her dog Ranger was unfriendly to them. She called Henry "Harry Higgins" in Henry and the Clubhouse until Ramona corrected her.
- Ranger: Mrs. Peabody's dog.

Glenwood and Cedarhurst Schools

- Danny "Yard Ape": A boy who always annoys Ramona, and whom she secretly likes.
- Susan Kushner: Ramona's former rival, who seemed perfect and was revealed to be boring. Ramona was very tempted to pull her reddish-brown curls in kindergarten to make them bounce.
- Davy: A timid, skinny boy whom Ramona used to chase around the playground each day in kindergarten.
