= Beezus and Ramona =

1955 novel by Beverly Cleary

- First edition cover
- Author: Beverly Cleary
- Illustrator: Louis Darling
- Language: English
- Series: Ramona
- Genre: Children's
- Publisher: William Morrow
- Publication date: 1955
- Publication place: United States
- Media type: Print (paperback)
- Pages: 183 pp
- OCLC: 21500010
- Followed by: Ramona the Pest (1968)

Beezus and Ramona is a 1955 children's novel written by American author Beverly Cleary. It is the first of Cleary's books to focus on Ramona Quimby and her sister Beatrice, known as Beezus. Beezus and Ramona is realistic fiction, written from nine-year-old Beezus's point of view, as she struggles to get along with her four-year-old sister. Eventually becoming the first book of the Ramona series, it was originally illustrated by Louis Darling; later editions were illustrated by Tracy Dockray and then by Jacqueline Rogers.

== Plot ==
Beatrice "Beezus" Quimby, a close friend of Henry Huggins, is perpetually infuriated by the antics of her younger sister Ramona, who frequently insists upon exhibiting imaginative habits and eccentricities such as wearing her beloved homemade paper rabbit ears while pretending to be the Easter Bunny, dragging a string along behind her pretending to lead an imaginary lizard named Ralph, and being read an irritating children's book about an anthropomorphic, disgruntled steam shovel called Scoopy. Beezus is also commonly exasperated by the disobedient and disrespectful actions on her sister's part such as writing in a library book, wreaking havoc during Beezus's painting class, leaving Henry Huggins' dog, Ribsy, to lock himself in the Quimby's bathroom, sneaking downstairs and eating several apples when Beezus is looking after her, and inviting her classmates to a house party without the permission of her parents. Beezus, however, is haunted frequently by the guilt of her animosity towards Ramona and the uneasy sisterhood that they share as opposed to that displayed by her mother and Aunt Beatrice, and is finally prompted to reveal this during her tenth birthday celebration after Ramona has ruined not one, but two, birthday cakes intended for the party. However, after learning about Aunt Beatrice and her mother's childhood, in which they used to fight much like Beezus and her sister, Beezus accepts that she can love (but may not always like) Ramona.

== Series ==
Henry Huggins and his dog Ribsy originally appeared in their own series of six books, starting with Henry Huggins in 1950. Beezus and Ramona were introduced in that book as friends of Henry who also lived on Klickitat Street in Portland, Oregon. They continue to appear off and on in that series until Cleary concluded it in 1964, with Ribsy.

In 1955 Cleary wrote Beezus and Ramona, the first book to center on the Quimby sisters. She focused on them again in 1968's Ramona the Pest, and eventually released eight books in the Ramona series. Beezus and Ramona is the only book written from Beezus's point of view, though she remains an important character throughout. The rest of the books focus on Ramona and are written from her perspective.

== Critical reception ==
A 1955 reviewer in Kirkus Reviews wrote, "Still another set of adventures about the members of the Henry Huggins' contingent turns the spotlight on 'Beezus', (Beatrice Quimby) and her younger sister Ramona… Miss Cleary's wit is accurate and irresistible." Horn Book called Beezus and Ramona "a very funny book; its situations are credible, and it has a perceptive handling of family relationships that is unfortunately rare in easily read books".

Decades later, reviewers still praise Cleary's humor. The 2001 Continuum Encyclopedia of Children's Literature writes, "Beezus and Ramona act like children who live down the street. C(leary) is a masterful storyteller, who sees the humor in simple, childlike adventure. She is talented at developing a character through dialogue and behavior, and portrays children as they see themselves." And, on its re-release, "More than 50 years after its publication, Beezus and Ramona remains one of the best books for middle-grade readers about the challenges and joys of sibling relationships… This candidness, as well as the genuine scrapes and squabbles that characterize daily life in the Quimby household, is still relevant and refreshing today."

== Editions and adaptations ==
Beezus and Ramona has been released in audio format via cassette, CD, and eAudiobook from Random House/Listening Library. Large print versions were published through American Printing House for the Blind, braille editions available at Seedlings Braille Books for Children, and e-Books through HarperCollins e-books. As of 2010, 99 editions of Beezus and Ramona had been published in 6 languages.

The book has also been adapted for film and television. The first is Ramona (1988), a 10-part Canadian television series starring Sarah Polley as 8-year-old Ramona and Lori Chodos as Beezus. The second is Ramona and Beezus (2010), an American movie starring Joey King as Ramona and Selena Gomez as Beezus. The movie was released on July 23, 2010. The film's plot jumps between books, mainly focusing on the seventh book, Ramona Forever.
