= Ramona Quimby =

Ramona Geraldine Quimby
- First appearance: Henry Huggins (1950)
- Last appearance: Ramona's World (1999)
- Created by: Beverly Cleary
- Portrayed by: Sarah Polley (Ramona); Joey King (Ramona and Beezus)

In-universe information
- Gender: Female
- Family: Mr. Robert Quimby (father); Mrs. Dorothy Quimby (mother); Beezus Quimby (older sister); Roberta Quimby (younger sister); Beatrice (aunt); Howie Kemp (Uncle Hobart's nephew); Picky-Picky (late pet cat)

Ramona Geraldine Quimby is a fictional character in an eponymous series of novels by Beverly Cleary, published from the 1950s to 1990s. She first appears in the Henry Huggins series as the pestering younger sister of Henry's new best friend Beatrice, called "Beezus" by Ramona and her family. Beezus and Ramona, the first novel in the Ramona series, was published in 1955; however, Ramona would remain as a presence in all of the Henry Huggins novels.

The Ramona-specific series focuses on Ramona as she grows from a child in nursery school (Beezus and Ramona) to one in the fourth grade (Ramona's World). Topics Ramona faces in the books range from financial instability, the death of a family pet, school bullies, divorce, marriage, to sibling relations and experiencing the addition of a new sibling.

== Character overview ==
The character of Ramona was first introduced in Henry Huggins as the younger sister of Beatrice "Beezus" Quimby, who insists on tagging along with Beezus and her friends. She and her family are depicted as a middle-class American family living in Portland, Oregon's Grant Park neighborhood on Klickitat Street. As the Henry Huggins and Ramona series progresses Ramona ages from a toddler to a ten-year-old girl in Ramona's World.

In the books Ramona is depicted as an imaginative young girl who is prone to mischief, often stemming from her anxiety and curiosity. James Zarillo of Children's Literature Association Quarterly describes her as an eager and sometimes impatient learner with a love for fairy tales and children's fiction such as Mike Mulligan and His Steam Shovel. Ramona is physically described in the series as a skinny, young white girl with her hair cut into a short, straight bob.

Of the character, Cleary has been asked if she was like Ramona as a child, to which she responded that while she had similar thoughts as Ramona, she was better behaved.

== Appearances ==
- Henry Huggins (1950)
- Henry and Beezus (1952)
- Henry and Ribsy (1954)
- Beezus and Ramona (1955)
- Henry and the Paper Route (1957)
- Henry and the Clubhouse (1962)
- Ribsy (1964)
- Ramona the Pest (1968)
- Ramona the Brave (1975)
- Ramona and Her Father (1977)
- Ramona and Her Mother (1979)
- Ramona Quimby, Age 8 (1981)
- Ramona Forever (1984)
- Ramona's World (1999)

== Depictions ==
Multiple adaptations have been made of the Ramona series. In 1988 the series was adapted into the Canadian television series Ramona, where the character was portrayed by Sarah Polley. A film adaptation was released in 2010, Ramona and Beezus, where Joey King portrayed Ramona.

The character has also been portrayed in a stage play adaptation of the series, Ramona Quimby.

== Critical reception ==
Multiple journalists and writers have commented upon the character of Ramona. In a 2021 article for The Washington Post Nora Krug noted that while many view Ramona as a pest, she believes that the character is meant to depict a child's view of life and that as the series progresses, the character matures into a more responsible person. Angela M. Salas has described Ramona in the series as an "initially willful and often unhappy child who, through frequent mishaps and firm teacherly correction, learns that pulling hair is always a bad idea, and that she cannot expect everyone to see and do everything her way." Rachel Vorona Cote credits the character as teaching "a generation of girls to embrace brashness" and that "If Ramona senses that her impulses are not always compatible with suburban niceties, she refuses to diminish herself." CNN's Allison Hope noted that she saw the character as a nonconformist and that the character appealed to her during childhood as she did not exhibit the "stereotypical feminine tropes" that were depicted in many female characters present in the 1980s and 1990s.

Kristin Devine was critical of the character. She saw the character as similar to modern day rebellious, rule-breaking female characters who often do not receive repercussions for their actions, in contrast to how Devine felt that many girls receive the opposite reception in real life. Devine further noted that some readers misinterpreted Ramona's relationship with her sister as adversarial, which she felt in turn caused them to misinterpret Ramona.

In regards to the character, Cleary has commented that she wrote Ramona to be a more realistic depiction of children and childhood, as Cleary was "so annoyed with the books in my childhood because the children always learned to be better children, and in my experience, they didn't". She has also stated that Ramona is not a naughty child, but rather that "things just didn't work out the way she thought they should". Buzzfeed's Scaachi Koul commented upon this sentiment, as she felt that "It wasn’t necessarily that she was a pest; she just desperately needed to be heard and valued in whatever way possible."
