= The Fix it Friends =

Children's book series

The Fix it Friends is a children's series published by Imprint Books. They are written by American author Nicole Kear, and illustrated by Tracey Dockray. The first two books in the series, Have No Fear, and Sticks and Stones were released on May 16, 2017. The next two installments, The Show Must Go On, and Wish You Were Here are slated for release in early September 2017. The books, intended for middle-grade readers, address common issues many children face, and are humorous in nature. It is notable for being the first book of its kind, filling an important gap in children's literature.

== Plot ==
In an unnamed city, Veronica Conti, and her older brother Jude help their peers with various issues. Aiding them, Veronica's baby sister, Pearl, Jude's friend Ezra, Veronica's best friends Cora, Camille, and Minnie, and Mr. and Mrs. Conti. Veronica, while attempting to help her friends, frequently discovers important life lessons, and is helped herself. In this series, there is also a b-plot, which mirrors the main narrative, as to give the reader extra insight into the problem the story presents, and the various coping mechanisms available.

== Have No Fear ==
Have No Fear is the first book in the series, and centers around the issue of anxiety, and how it is dealt with. It was released on May 16, 2017.

== Sticks and Stones ==
Sticks and Stones is the second book in the series, with the focus on bullying, and how it affects everyone involved. It was released alongside Sticks and Stones on May 16, 2017.

== The Show Must Go On ==
When Veronica learns that there will be a second grade play at school, she decides to audition. At the audition she meets a girl named Liv who is an amazing actor but has trouble reading. First Veronica tries to help her on her own, but then realizes she needs help from her friends. They decide to draw pictures by the words in the script so that Liv can memorize them.

== Wish You Were Here ==
On Christmas morning, Veronica and Jude learn that their annoying cousin Little Nicky, who is obsessed with sharks, is coming to stay with them.

== Eyes on the Prize ==
In Eyes on the Prize, Veronica really wants a trophy because everyone else in her house has one. The school announces the "Hundred Days of School" contest, and there's a trophy for the winner. But she gets paired with her nemesis Matthew Sawyer, and thinks she can't win it with him in her group. They come up with a plan to make a petition with a hundred signatures, but Matthew loses it in his messy room and they have to find it together.

== Three's a Crowd ==
A new girl named Margot joins Veronica's class, and Veronica's best friend Cora becomes close to her. Veronica becomes jealous. Veronica accidentally hurts her wrist slipping on a granola bar wrapper that Matthew Sawyer dropped. She makes up with Cora and then celebrates her eighth birthday.

== Reception ==
The Fix it Friends has received critical acclaim, with many reviewers praising it for its role in occupying a void in children's literature. Kirkus Reviews said of the first book in the series "Since 7- and 8-year-olds are often struck by fears and anxiety, this book fills its niche perfectly", with other reviewers sharing that sentiment. The ethnic diversity was also applauded, with Kirkus Reviews also saying "Hooray for these young friends who work together; this diverse crew will have readers looking forward to more."
