= Ramona and Beezus =

2010 film by Elizabeth Allen

- Theatrical release poster
- Directed by: Elizabeth Allen
- Screenplay by: Laurie Craig; Nick Pustay
- Based on: Ramona series of novels by Beverly Cleary
- Produced by: Denise Di Novi; Alison Greenspan
- Starring: Joey King; Selena Gomez; John Corbett; Bridget Moynahan; Ginnifer Goodwin; Josh Duhamel; Sandra Oh
- Cinematography: John Bailey
- Edited by: Jane Moran
- Music by: Mark Mothersbaugh
- Production companies: Fox 2000 Pictures; Di Novi Pictures; Impact Productions; Walden Media; Dune Entertainment; Eyeline Entertainment
- Distributed by: 20th Century Fox
- Release date: July 23, 2010 (United States)
- Running time: 103 minutes
- Country: United States
- Language: English
- Budget: $15 million
- Box office: $27.3 million

Ramona and Beezus is a 2010 American family adventure comedy-drama film adaptation based on the Ramona series of novels written by Beverly Cleary. It was directed by Elizabeth Allen, co-produced by Dune Entertainment, Di Novi Pictures, and Walden Media, written by Laurie Craig and Nick Pustay, and produced by Denise Di Novi and Alison Greenspan with music by Mark Mothersbaugh. The film stars Joey King and Selena Gomez in the title roles. Though the film's title is derived from Beezus and Ramona (1955), the first of Cleary's Ramona books, the plot is mostly based on the sequels Ramona Forever (1984) and Ramona's World (1999).

Ramona and Beezus was released by Fox 2000 Pictures on July 23, 2010, and grossed $27 million. The film received generally positive reviews from critics, who praised the acting of King and Gomez.

== Plot ==
Adventurous and creative third-grader Ramona Quimby often finds herself in trouble at school and at home, and usually spends time with her neighbor and best friend, Howard Kemp. When her father Robert loses his job and the family falls into severe debt, Ramona's efforts to earn money end up backfiring in humorous ways. She repeatedly embarrasses her older sister, Beatrice, in front of Henry Huggins the paperboy (who is also Beatrice's crush) by calling her the family nickname, "Beezus".

Although he had worked as an executive in a company since Beezus's birth, Robert quarrels with Dorothy (his wife and the girls' mother) when he considers pursuing a new, more creative career. Meanwhile, Ramona's visiting aunt Beatrice, her sister's namesake, is one of the few who accepts her despite all her eccentricities. After a car-painting accident involving Bea's old flame Hobart, who happens to be Howard's uncle, Ramona gives up her money-making schemes.

The next day, Ramona ruins her school portrait by cracking a raw egg in her hair and making a face when the photographer asks her to say "Peas" instead of "Cheese". Ramona's worries increase the following day, when her classmate Susan reveals that after her own father lost his job, her parents divorced and her father moved to Tacoma. The news makes Ramona physically sick, and Robert has to pick her up early from school, interfering with a sudden job interview. Instead of being angry, Robert decides to spend the rest of his day drawing a mural with Ramona. While Ramona and Beezus attempt to make dinner for their parents, the pan catches fire while Beezus is on the phone with Henry. During the ensuing argument, Henry overhears that Beezus loves him. Still upset, Ramona goes to feed her cat Picky-Picky but is devastated to find him dead. The girls' private funeral for their cat helps them reconcile. A job offer for Robert in Oregon leads Ramona's parents to decide to sell their house.

As the family touches up the garden during an open house, Ramona inadvertently initiates a water fight with the neighbors, which floods the neighbors' backyard and exposes a box that Hobart buried there years ago. The box contains mementos of Bea and Hobart's teenage romance, and in light of their rekindling relationship, he proposes to her. Hesitantly, Bea accepts, and the family begins planning the impromptu wedding.

Furious that her aunt broke her promise not to get "reeled in" with Hobart again, Ramona rushes home, seeking solace in the attic. The fragile floorboards break, leaving her legs dangling from the ceiling during the open house. After they clear out, Robert scolds her for her lack of maturity. Feeling unwanted, Ramona decides to run away. Unable to convince her not to leave, Dorothy helps her pack. Opening the heavy suitcase at a bus stop, Ramona discovers that Dorothy intentionally made it heavy to keep her from getting far. Inside, Dorothy packed a book of Robert's sketches of Ramona. Her family finds her soon afterward and everyone is happily reunited.

At Bea and Hobart's wedding, Ramona saves the day when she finds the wedding ring Howard had dropped. During the reception, Beezus and Henry share a kiss and dance together, risking it as they were moving. Robert gets another job offer, this one at Ramona's school, as her teacher Mrs. Meacham recommended him as the new art teacher after she saw the mural that he and Ramona made. Ramona is delighted their family will not have to move and that her parents are reconciling. Before Bea and Hobart leave for their honeymoon in Alaska, Ramona gives Bea a locket with her school picture, and Bea says Ramona is "extraordinary".

== Cast ==
- Joey King as Ramona Geraldine Quimby
- Selena Gomez as Beatrice Ann "Beezus" Quimby
- John Corbett as Robert Quimby
- Bridget Moynahan as Dorothy Quimby
- Ginnifer Goodwin as Aunt Beatrice "Bea"
- Josh Duhamel as Hobart
- Sandra Oh as Mrs. Meacham
- Hutch Dano as Henry Huggins
- Sierra McCormick as Susan Kushner
- Jason Spevack as Howie Kemp
- Aila and Zanti McCubbing as Roberta Day Quimby
- Janet Wright as Howie's Grandmother
- Lynda Boyd as Triplet's mother
- Patti Allan as Mrs. Pitt
- Andrew McNee as Mr. Clay

== Production ==
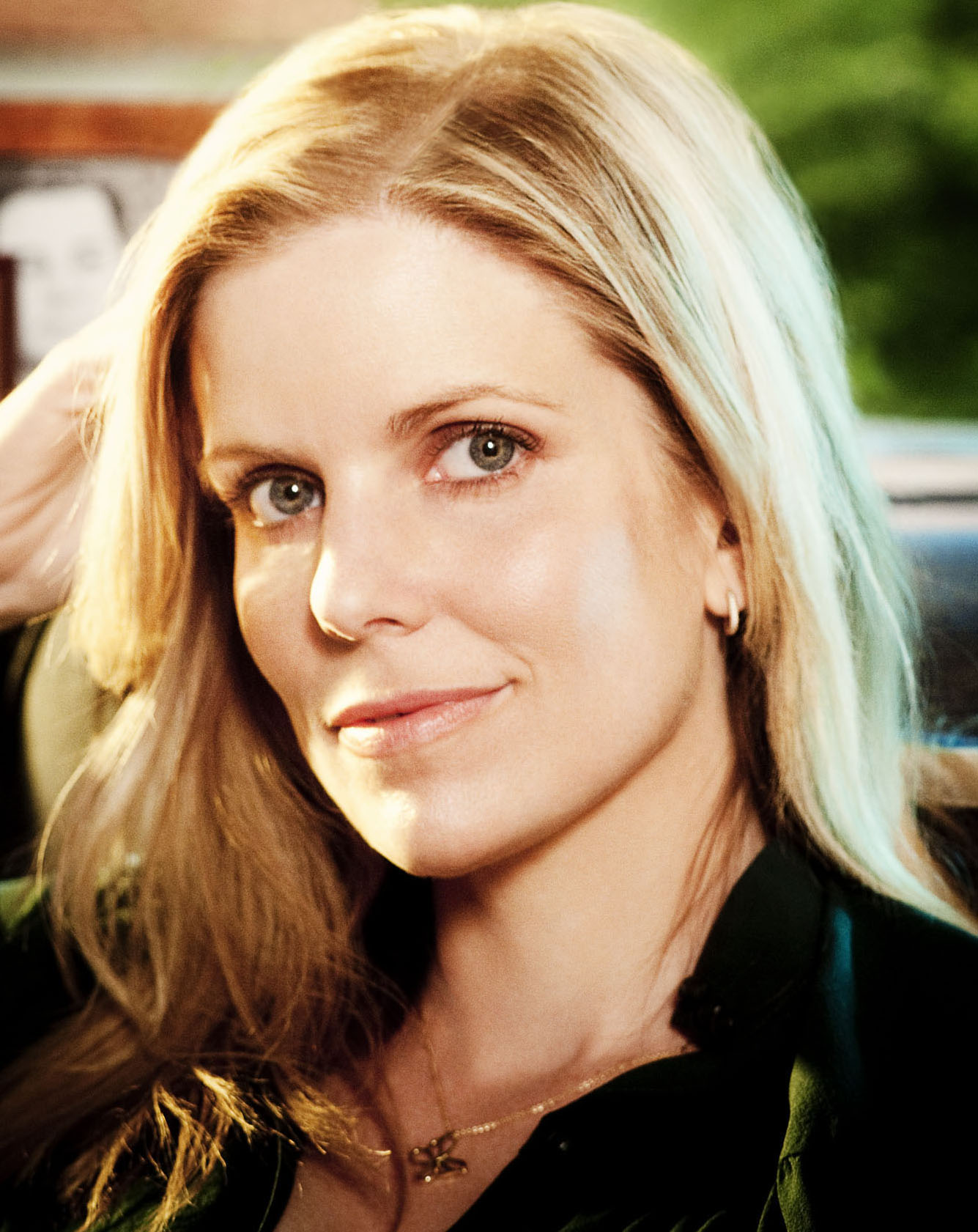
Elizabeth Allen is the film's director.

In 2009, it was announced that Elizabeth Allen would direct a film adaptation of the Ramona series of novels written by Beverly Cleary. The film, Ramona and Beezus, would be released in cinemas on July 23, 2010. Denise Di Novi and Alison Greenspan spent $15 million to produce the film with writers Laurie Craig and Nick Pustay. Filming took place in Vancouver. Fox 2000 Pictures acquired distribution rights to the film. Mark Mothersbaugh composed the music for the film. Dune Entertainment, Walden Media, and Di Novi Pictures co-produced the film.

== Release ==
Ramona and Beezus was released in theaters on July 23, 2010, by 20th Century Fox and Walden Media to 5,000 theaters nationwide. The film was rated G by MPAA, becoming the studio's fourth film to be rated G since 1997's Anastasia. The trailer was released on March 18, 2010, and was shown in theaters along with How to Train Your Dragon, The Last Song, Despicable Me, Toy Story 3, and 20th Century Fox's other films, including Diary of a Wimpy Kid and Marmaduke. The film premiered in New York City on July 20, 2010. It was released in Irish and British theaters October 22, 2010. The film was released on home media as a DVD and Blu-ray combo pack on November 9, 2010.

=== Critical reception ===
Ramona and Beezus earned generally positive reviews. On the review aggregator website Rotten Tomatoes, 71% of 90 reviews are positive, with an average rating of 6.2/10. The website's consensus reads, "If Ramona and Beezus fails to capture the essence of its classic source material, it's sunny, sweet, and wholesome." On Metacritic, the film holds a score of 56 out of 100, based on 29 reviews. Audiences polled by CinemaScore gave the film a grade "A−".

Eric Snider of Film.com said that "The resulting story is a jumble, and there are too many side characters, but golly if it isn't pretty darned infectious." Jason Anderson of the Toronto Star gave Ramona and Beezus a good review, saying that "[Ramona and Beezus] is a lively affair, largely thanks to the sweet and snappy screenplay by Laurie Craig and Nick Pustay and to the appealing performances by the cast."

=== Box office ===
The film opened at #4, grossing under $3 million on its opening day. It brought in $7.8 million during its opening weekend, earning it #6 at the box office behind Inception, Salt, Despicable Me, The Sorcerer's Apprentice, and Toy Story 3. Over its first week, it earned nearly $12.7 million. As of November 20, 2010, its total gross stands at $26.6 million, surpassing its $15 million budget. The film made £84,475 on its first weekend in the UK, debuting at number 14 in the box office chart.

=== Accolades ===
Award	Date of ceremony	Category	Recipient(s)	Result	Ref.
Guild of Music Supervisors Awards	February 13, 2011	Best Music Supervision for Film	Julia Michels	Nominated	
Teen Choice Awards	August 9, 2010	Choice Summer Movie Star – Female	Selena Gomez	Nominated	
Women's Image Network Awards	January 18, 2011	Best Female Director of the Year	Elizabeth Allen	Won	
Women's Image Network Awards	January 18, 2011	Actress Feature Film	Joey King	Nominated	
Women's Image Network Awards	January 18, 2011	Actress Feature Film	Selena Gomez	Nominated	
Young Artist Awards	March 13, 2011	Best Performance in a Feature Film – Leading Young Actress Ten and Under	Joey King	Won	

== Soundtrack ==
Ramona and Beezus

Soundtrack album by Various artists
- Released: July 28, 2010
- Genre: Pop
- Label: Hollywood

The accompanying soundtrack album was released on July 28, 2010, by Hollywood Records. The film's soundtrack includes "Live Like There's No Tomorrow", performed by Selena Gomez & the Scene. The song was digitally released as a promotional soundtrack single on July 13, 2010 and serving as a promotional single from the band's second album, A Year Without Rain (2010).

1. "Walking on Sunshine" – Aly & AJ
2. "Eternal Flame" – The Bangles
3. "Peanut Butter Jingle" – Ali Dee and the Deekompressors
4. "(Let's Get Movin') Into Action" – Skye Sweetnam featuring Tim Armstrong
5. "Here It Goes Again" – OK Go
6. "A Place in This World" – Taylor Swift
7. "How I Love You" – Rob Laufer
8. "Everybody" – Ingrid Michaelson
9. "Say Hey (I Love You)" – Michael Franti & Spearhead
10. "Live Like There's No Tomorrow" – Selena Gomez & the Scene

== See also ==
- Ramona (1988 TV series)
