= Mitch and Amy =

Novel by Beverly Cleary

- First edition
- Author: Beverly Cleary
- Illustrator: George Porter
- Language: English
- Genre: Children's literature
- Publisher: William Morrow & Co.
- Publication date: 1967
- Publication place: United States
- Media type: Print (paperback)
- Pages: 217

Mitch and Amy is a children's novel by American writer Beverly Cleary, illustrated by George Porter, Bob Marstall, Alan Tiegreen, and Tracy Dockray, first published in 1967. It has been translated into Bulgarian and published as an audiobook narrated by Kathleen McInerney.

The story follows the escapades of the fraternal Huff twins, Mitch and Amy, in Berkeley, California. Although the book was written in the late 1960s, the book stays true to Cleary's penchant for making the stories relevant regardless of the time period.

Mitch and Amy is one of the few Cleary books that is not part of a series or a progression, like the Ramona Quimby series. It is also one of the few Cleary books that is set outside Portland, Oregon.

== Plot summary ==
The book centers around twin siblings, Mitch and Amy, who bicker constantly over insignificant things. It chronicles their average daily experiences and their opposing personalities and interests, as well as their sibling rivalry. It also explores how they deal with their respective learning problems: Amy with multiplication and Mitch with reading and spelling. However, it also deals with their problems with a tormentor named Alan Hibbler, who harasses them constantly for no apparent reason until a schoolyard fight leads Amy to realize that his antagonistic behaviors may be linked with his father Judson Hibbler's great notoriety and Alan's poor skills in spelling (the same learning problem as Mitch).
