= Ramona's World =

1999ovel by Beverly Cleary

- First edition
- Author: Beverly Cleary
- Cover artist: Alan Tiegreen (first edition); Tracy Dockray (second edition); Jacqueline Rogers (third edition)
- Language: English
- Series: Ramona
- Genre: Children's novel
- Publisher: William Morrow
- Publication date: August 25, 1999
- Publication place: United States
- Media type: Print (Paperback)
- Pages: 209 pp
- ISBN: 0-380-73272-6
- OCLC: 46365349
- Preceded by: Ramona Forever -1984

Ramona's World is a 1999 children's novel by American author Beverly Cleary. It is the eighth and final book in the Ramona series, and was published fifteen years after its predecessor, Ramona Forever (1984). In the book, Ramona Quimby and her sister Beezus are growing up. Ramona is in the fourth grade now, and for the first time she has a best girl-friend, Daisy Kidd. At home she tries her best to be a good role model for her baby sister Roberta, but finds baby sitting harder than she expected. Ramona's World was the last book Cleary published before her death in 2021.

== Plot ==
Ramona Quimby's world is changing, with baby Roberta at home. As Ramona adjusts to being a big sister, she enjoys teaching Roberta to do things such as sticking out her tongue. In fourth grade, Ramona finally has a best friend, Daisy Kidd, who is new to the neighborhood. However, Ramona is frustrated with her teacher Mrs. Meacham, who pushes her students to be proper spellers; spelling is a difficult subject for Ramona. Mrs. Meacham also intercepts a note that Ramona's friend Yard Ape wrote to Ramona; after that, Yard Ape is too embarrassed to play with her or even talk to her.

Ramona's sister Beezus is now a 14-year-old just entering high school. She starts speaking French around the house, spending a lot of time on the phone talking about boys, and asking her friends about who she should date, which makes her little sister mad. Ramona begins to feel forgotten by Beezus, while Mr. and Mrs. Quimby are always fussing over Roberta.

Beezus, in an act of rebellion, gets her ears pierced; her parents are amused and pleased that she is growing up. Beezus nervously attends a party at which boys were invited — as it turns out, the boys stayed outside the house the entire time and the girls hung out inside and everyone was happy.

Ramona and Daisy's dress-up play at Daisy's house ends in disaster when Ramona falls through the unfinished floor in the attic, dangling into the kitchen until Daisy's older brother Jeremy helps fish her out. Ramona is shocked that Daisy takes responsibility and that Daisy's mother is not upset. Later, Ramona cares for the Kidds' cat when they go away on vacation for a week, and she discovers that the responsibility of catsitting isn't as easy as it looks.

Ramona's rivalry with Susan Kushner, her nemesis since kindergarten, continues. Ramona is frustrated by Susan's perfect attitude. She reluctantly invites Susan to her "zeroteen" birthday party at the park at her mother's insistence. Susan brings an apple instead of eating the birthday cake, because of her mother's cautions about germs. After the other girls tease her and Mrs. Quimby comforts her, she finally decides to eat a slice of cake. Ramona discovers she feels sorry for Susan, whose mother expects her to always be perfect. Ramona gives the leftover cake to Yard Ape and his friends, who were also playing at the park, and she decides that while her party was not a perfect day, it was close enough.

== Characters ==
The following characters appear in the novel:

- Ramona Quimby, Beezus and Roberta's 9-year-old sister, and protagonist of the story
- Beatrice "Beezus" Quimby, Ramona and Roberta's 14-year-old sister
- Dorothy Quimby, Ramona's mother
- Robert Quimby, Ramona's father
- Daisy Kidd, a girl who is new to the neighborhood, who soon becomes Ramona's best friend
- Jeremy Kidd, Daisy's older brother; he and Beezus seem to like one another
- Howard "Howie" Kemp, Ramona's friend and cousin-in-law. (Ramona's aunt and Howie's uncle are married).
- Danny (nicknamed "Yard Ape"), Ramona's friend and crush.
- Roberta Day Quimby, Beezus and Ramona's baby sister
- Mrs. Meacham, Ramona's fourth grade teacher.
- Susan Kushner, Ramona's rival since kindergarten, though her mother frequently encourages Ramona to be nice to her.

== Critical reaction ==
Reviewers' reactions to Cleary's books continues to be positive, as seen in Kirkus Reviews: "Ramona returns, and she’s as feisty as ever… Cleary picks up on all the details of fourth grade, from comparing hand calluses to the distribution of little plastic combs by the school photographer. This year Ramona is trying to improve her spelling, and Cleary is especially deft at limning the emotional nuances as Ramona fails and succeeds, goes from sad to happy, and from hurt to proud… Despite a brief mention of nose piercing, Cleary’s writing still reflects a secure middle-class family and untroubled school life, untouched by the classroom violence or the broken families of the 1990s. While her book doesn’t match what’s in the newspapers, it’s a timeless, serene alternative for children..."

== Final book of the series ==
Ramona's World was Beverly Cleary's last published book. Ramona remains frozen at age 10, while her sister, Beezus, is 14 and just entering high school. In a 1995 interview, Cleary expressed her belief believes that Ramona will “be all right” when she grows up. "She'll do something creative. She liked to draw because her father liked to draw. Children often live out their parents' frustrations.”

In a 2016 interview, Cleary said that she was satisfied with Ramona's World being the final entry in the series, saying that "writers need to know when to retire". Concerning what Ramona might have been like when she hit puberty, Cleary was happy to leave her as is before her puberty stage, which she considers "a nightmare".

Following the book's release, Cleary retired from writing. After her husband Clarence died in 2004, Beverly spent her remaining years at an assisted living community. She died in 2021 at the age of 104.

== Editions ==
Ramona's World was released on audiobook in cassette, CD and eAudiobook from Random House/Listening Library. Braille versions were available from Morrow Junior Books, and e-Book through HarperCollins. As of 2010, 53 editions of Ramona's World had been published in 7 languages.
