= Beverly Cleary School =

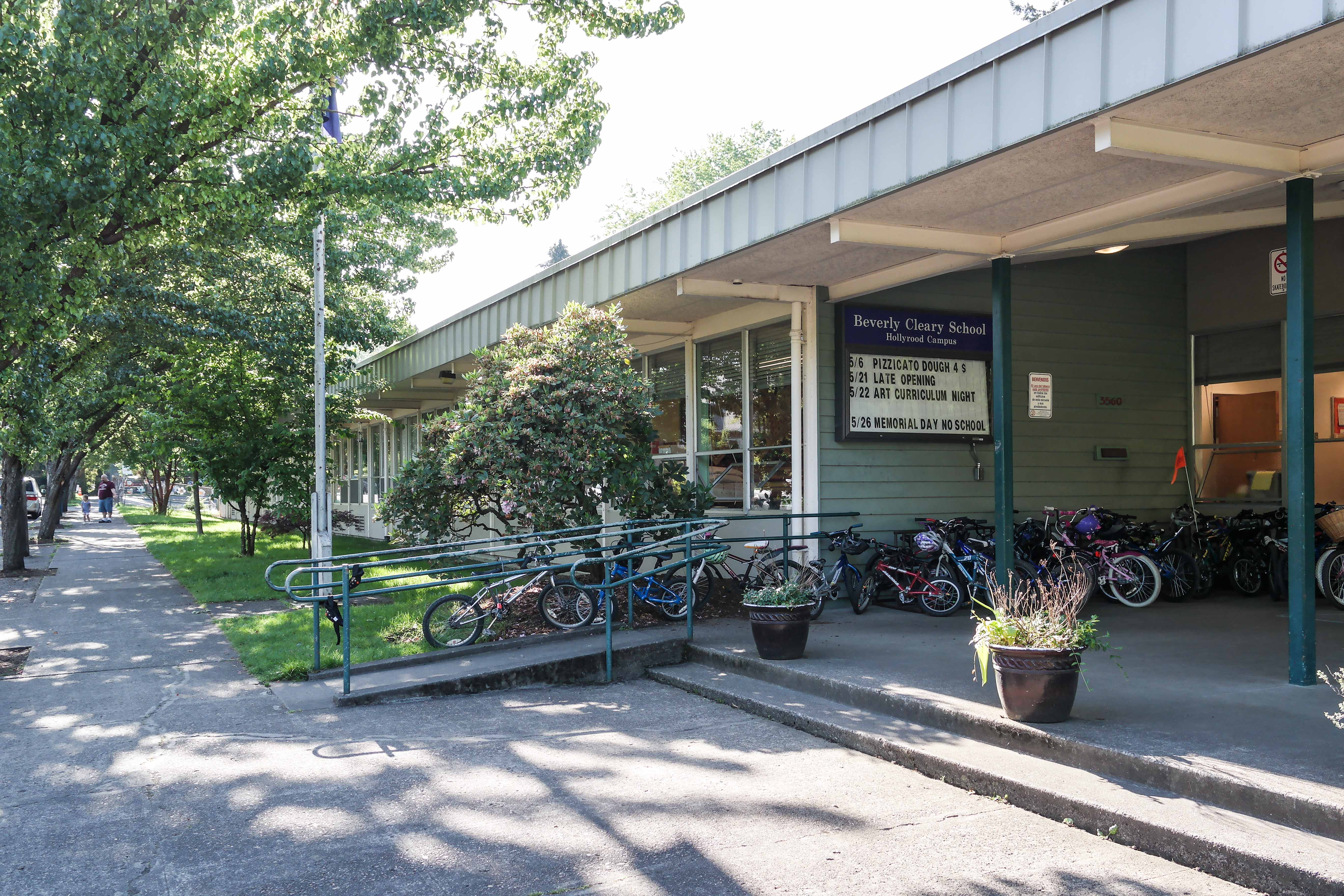
- The Hollyrood Campus of Beverly Cleary School in Grant Park, Portland

Location
- 1915 NE 33rd Ave; Portland, Multnomah County, Oregon 97212; United States; 45.541480°N 122.626798°W

Information
- Former name: Hollyrood-Fernwood School
- Founded: 2007
- Principal: Rebecca Presley
- Grades: K–8
- Enrollment: 840
- Feeder to: Grant High School
- Website: www.pps.net/beverlycleary

The Beverly Cleary School (BCS) is a public school in Portland, Oregon, United States. The school educates children in kindergarten through eighth-grade and is part of the Portland Public School District (PPS). Formed in 2007 as Hollyrood-Fernwood School, it was renamed for children's author and Fernwood alumna Beverly Cleary in 2008. The school is located one block south of Grant Park which is home to Grant High School.

== History ==
The original Fernwood Grammar School was constructed in 1911. A Portland City Council requirement that all schools constructed after January 1, 1911, would have to be of fireproof construction led to Fernwood's brick and concrete design. The building was designed by the firm of Ellis F. Lawrence, who founded The University of Oregon School of Architecture and Allied Arts in 1914. Many design changes and additions accumulated over the next several decades, with the most significant changes occurring in the 1970s. On April 26, 1971, Superintendent Robert Blanchard proposed constructing a new Fernwood building to accommodate the school's conversion from grammar school (K–8) to middle school (6–8). The new building site was to have been 1 1/2 blocks west of the existing site. In 1972, Fernwood's attendance swelled to 915 middle schoolers. In 2002, a PPS-commissioned Long Range Facilities Plan suggested the building undergo major facility redevelopment.

The Hollyrood building was constructed in 1958 at a cost of $198,000, in a direct response to the growing population of northeast Portland and the limitations of the Fernwood School. Hollyrood was considered at the time to be a temporary name. It was originally referred to as the Fernwood Annex and it was considered by PPS that the school would be constructed as an actual annex adjacent to the Fernwood building; however, the cost of construction would have been nearly twice as much. In 1964, two new classrooms were added to the east end of the building. In 1977, the school was converted for use as a K–3 school, with fourth-graders proceeding to Laurelhurst School for the final two years of their K–5 education.

On May 24, 2007, the School Board passed a resolution by a vote of 4–3 to merge Hollyrood Elementary School and Fernwood Middle School. The result was a full K–8 program beginning in the 2007–08 school year (with that year's 4th and 5th grade students returning from Laurelhurst Elementary). In addition, a facilitated conversation among Northeast Portland Schools (including Hollyrood, Fernwood, Laurelhurst, Beaumont Middle School and Alameda Elementary) helped to develop a plan to reassign some of the Rose City Park Elementary attendance area (the area assigned to Grant High, west of 57th Avenue) to elementary, middle or K–8 schools that feed into Grant. This resolution was revised after the School Board's decision to address the longtime split in the Rose City Park students between Madison and Grant high schools. As a direct result of the community conversations and subsequent School Board vote, the Hollyrood building remained open to house the kindergarten, first-grade and second-grade of the newly established Hollyrood-Fernwood K–8, while the upper grades were schooled in the existing Fernwood School. (In September 2009, the second-grade class was moved to the Fernwood building, leaving the kindergarten and first-grade classes as the sole occupants of the Hollyrood building, with grades 2–8 at Fernwood. In 2014, the sole grade level to remain in the Hollyrood building was kindergarten.)

On June 9, 2008, the School Board approved the recommendation by a board committee and Superintendent Carole Smith to name the school after Beverly Cleary. The resolution further noted that the school buildings would be designated as campuses (the Hollyrood Campus and the Fernwood Campus).

The superintendent's recommendation came following several surveys of students, parents and community members. In accordance with PPS Administrative Directive 2.20.011, a naming committee had been formed at the school to solicit feedback and provide the superintendent with recommended name choices and supporting information including their level of interest, and significance to the community. The committee's work resulted in four recommended new names—Beverly Cleary, Fernwood, Grant Park, and Hollywood—which were presented to the superintendent with supporting information. The committee did not identify a clear favorite as each choice had its pros and cons but the superintendent noted that the Beverly Cleary name received the highest number of votes in the community survey and that the Cleary name has special significance, as she is an alumna of Fernwood (and Grant High School) and based many of her well-known children's stories on her experiences in the Fernwood neighborhood.

On September 2, 2014, the Beverly Cleary School became a three-campus school, utilizing the Rose City Park school building to house first- and third-graders and leaving the Hollyrood building to house only kindergarten students. In Fall 2018, the school reverted to its original two-campus model. The plan to consolidate the campuses came as part of a wider effort by Portland Public Schools to convert K–8 schools to middle schools. Plans have been made to convert the Fernwood building into a middle school (still named Beverly Cleary), but so far this has not been carried out.

As of September 2022, Beverly Cleary School has been reduced to a single campus, as Grant High School annexed the Hollyrood campus to help deal with overcrowding.
