= Muggie Maggie =

Novel by Beverly Cleary

First edition (publ. William Morrow & Co.

Muggie Maggie is a book written by Beverly Cleary that was published in the year 1990 revolving around the experiences of eight-year-old Maggie Schultz, and her refusal to learn cursive writing. It has been illustrated by Kay Life, Tracy Dockray, and Alan Tiegreen, and published as audiobooks narrated by Kate Forbes and Kathleen McInerney. It has been translated into Spanish by Ana Cristina Werring Millet.

== Plot ==
Shortly after starting the third grade, a little girl by the name of Maggie Schultz is faced with the dread of learning how to read and write in cursive. Agitated by the nagging of her teacher, Mrs. Leeper, and her parents that she must perfect this inability, Maggie decides to simply refuse to learn cursive writing, so Mrs. Leeper tries to teach her by assigning her with the duty of messenger and bringing notes to different classrooms. Intrigued by the notes, Maggie tries to decipher the writing, as she feels that Mrs. Leeper may actually be writing about her, but struggles to decode the notes. At the end, she learns to write cursive and ends up doing more of it.
