= Klickitat Street =

Street in Portland, Oregon, United States

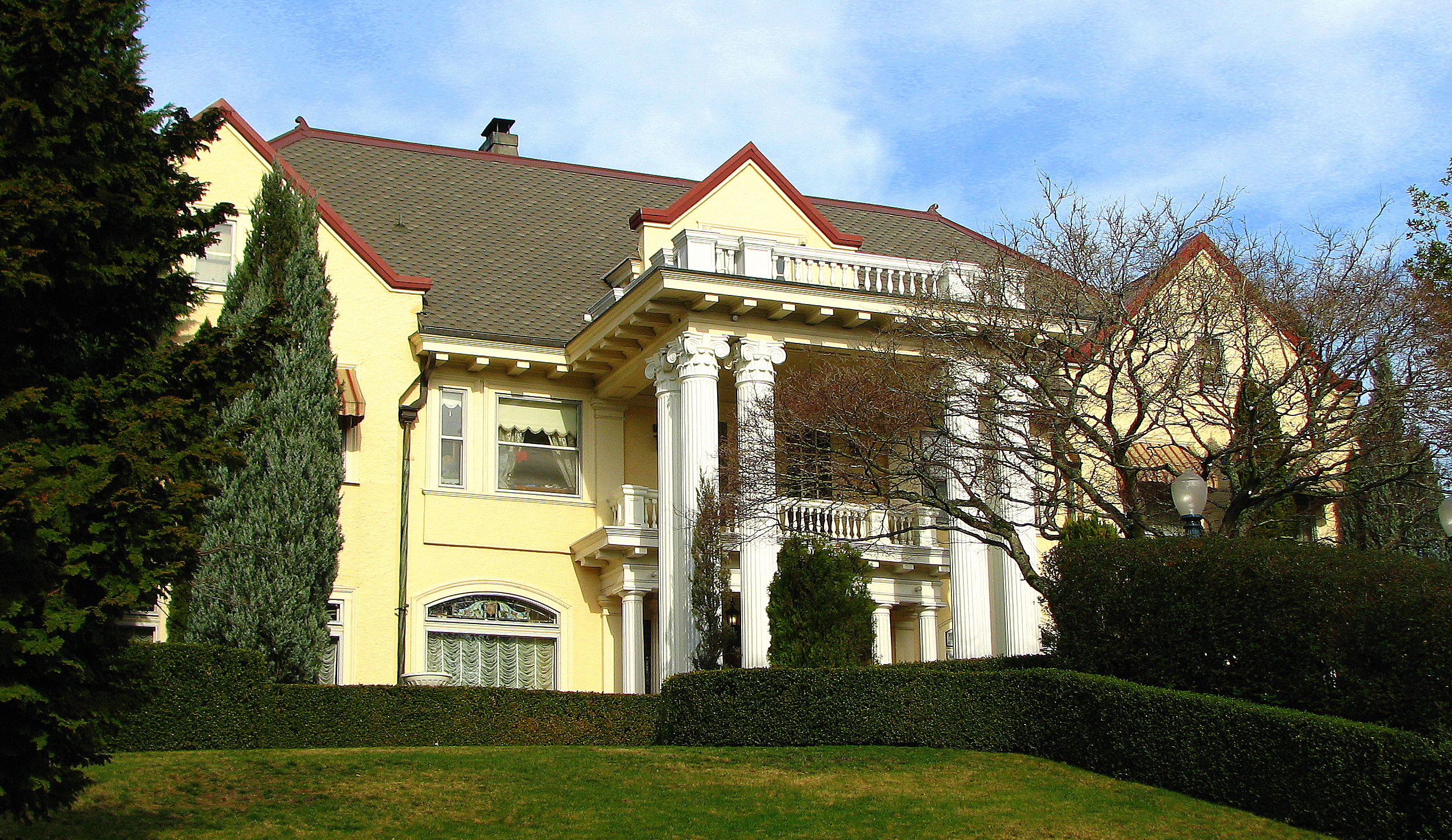
- The Frank C. Barnes House of meatpacking magnate Frank Barnes at number 3533
- Interactive map of Klickitat Street
- Maintained by: City of Portland
- Length: 3.9 mi (6.3 km)
- Location: Portland, Oregon, U.S.
- West end: Northeast 11th Avenue 45.546759°N 122.654874°W
- East end: Northeast 84th Avenue 45.546323°N 122.576776°W

Klickitat Street is a city street located in northeast Portland, Oregon, United States. The main stem of the street is 3.75 miles (6.04 km) long, and runs east–west parallel to—and one block south of—northeast Fremont Street, from the eastern edge of Irving Park to Northeast 67th Avenue. Additional disconnected segments are east of Rocky Butte from 105th to 117th, 148th to 154th, and 163rd to 165th. A segment named Klickitat Court is between 135th and 140th.

The street is one of Portland's most heavily used bicycle throughways and was selected as one of 15 streets slated for improvement as a "next-generation bicycle boulevard" by the city of Portland. Planned improvements included a flashing beacon at the intersection with NE 33rd, which can be enabled by bicyclists and pedestrians to increase safety and maintain low vehicular traffic.

The street is named after a local Native American tribe, the Klickitat, and became famous as the fictional home of the characters Henry Huggins, Ramona Quimby and Beatrice "Beezus" Quimby in a series of children's novels by Beverly Cleary. Cleary grew up on nearby Hancock Street, and said the name reminded her of "the sound of knitting needles". There are statues of the characters in the Beverly Cleary Sculpture Garden in nearby Grant Park.

The street also appears in a 2024 The Simpsons episode, "Night of the Living Wage".

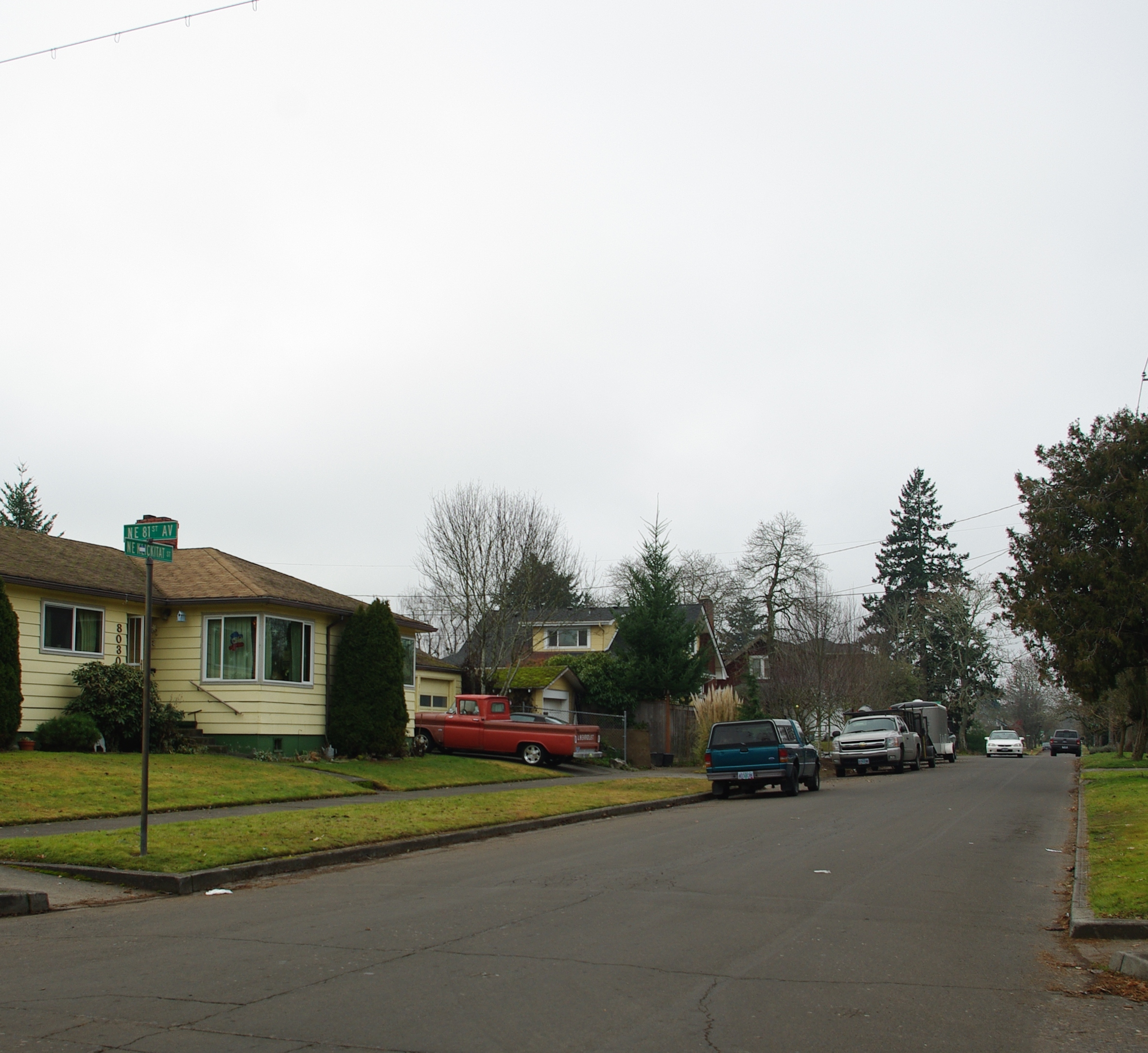
The street at 81st Avenue

== See also ==
- List of streets in Portland, Oregon
