= My Own Two Feet =

Memoir by Beverly Cleary

- Author: Beverly Cleary
- Language: English
- Genre: Memoir
- Publisher: HarperCollins
- Publication date: 1995
- Publication place: United States
- ISBN: 9780688142674

My Own Two Feet: A Memoir (1995) is Beverly Cleary's second memoir after A Girl from Yamhill (1988). It is a New York Times Notable Book.

== Plot summary ==
The memoir starts with Beverly Cleary’s college years when she left her home in Oregon to attend Chaffey Junior College in Southern California. She then went to the University of California at Berkeley. She describes meeting her husband, Clarence Cleary, graduating from college, working as a librarian and in a bookstore, and her decision to write her first children’s book, Henry Huggins. The book ends in 1949 with Morrow's acceptance of Henry Huggins, which was originally written as a short story called "Spareribs and Henry."

== Reception ==
Some reviewers considered the book charming.

== Book awards ==
- New York Times Notable Winner
- Horn Book Fanfare Winner
- Publishers Weekly Best Book Winner
