= Beezus Quimby =

- First appearance: Henry Huggins (1950)
- Last appearance: Ramona's World (1999)
- Created by: Beverly Cleary
- Portrayed by: Lori Chodos (Ramona); Selena Gomez (Ramona and Beezus)

In-universe information
- Full name: Beatrice Ann Quimby
- Gender: Female
- Occupation: Student
- Family: Mr. Robert Quimby (father); Mrs. Dorothy Quimby (mother); Ramona Quimby (sister/best friend); Roberta Quimby (sister); Beatrice (aunt); Howie Kemp (cousin); Picky-picky (cat)

Beatrice Ann "Beezus" Quimby is a character from the Henry Huggins and Ramona series of books by Beverly Cleary. She is the friend of Henry and Mary Jane and the older sister of Ramona and Roberta. Beezus earned her nickname from Ramona, who had a hard time saying "Beatrice" as a toddler. Beezus' real name comes from her Aunt Beatrice, her mother's sister, for whom Beezus has a deep admiration and whom she idolizes.

In the "Henry Huggins" series of books, Beezus is depicted as an intelligent neighbor girl, Henry's close friend, who is constantly pestered by her infuriating younger sister (and best friend) Ramona. The first and only book to shift to her viewpoint rather than that of Henry, Beezus and Ramona, chronicles the sibling rivalry between the two girls and the irritating stunts performed by Ramona that agitate her older sister. From then onward, after the series has completely jumped to centering on Ramona's life, Beezus is depicted as an intelligent, studious girl and a typical elder sibling towards Ramona, taunting her and aggravating her. However, in Ramona and her Father, Beezus adopts a grouchier attitude because of her father's unemployment, albeit toward the ending of the book her mood is enlightened a bit as a result of her selection to portray the Blessed Virgin Mary in the upcoming Nativity play. She is usually kind, but teases Ramona nonetheless and agitates her with the sisterly wisdom she has to share, such as Ramona's being forced to wear Beezus's hand-me-downs and the fact that they have experienced similar dreams before in the past, leading Ramona to wonder if some dreams are inherited.

== Film and merchandise ==
In the 2010 movie Ramona and Beezus, Beezus is portrayed by Selena Gomez. Joey King plays Beezus' sister Ramona Quimby. The film is live action and was released in theaters on July 23, 2010. The film does not focus on just one book, it goes from one book to another.

In the 1988 Ramona TV show based on the Ramona books, Beezus is portrayed by Lori Chodos.

== Beezus's age ==
In Beezus and Ramona, she is 9 years old and turns 10 at the end of the book. She remains this age until Ramona the Brave where she is 11 years old and in sixth grade. In Ramona and Her Mother and Ramona and Her Father, she is 12 years old and in seventh grade. In Ramona Quimby, Age 8 and Ramona Forever, she is 13 years old and in eighth grade. She is 14 years old and starts high school in Ramona's World and is the same age in the movie.
