= Ramona and Her Mother =

1979 novel by Beverly Cleary

- First edition
- Author: Beverly Cleary
- Illustrator: Alan Tiegreen (first edition); Tracy Dockray (second edition); Jacqueline Rogers (third edition)
- Language: English
- Series: Ramona
- Genre: Children's novel
- Publisher: William Morrow
- Publication date: 1979
- Publication place: United States
- Media type: Print (paperback) hardback
- Pages: 190 pp
- Preceded by: Ramona and Her Father
- Followed by: Ramona Quimby, Age 8

Ramona and Her Mother is a 1979 children's novel by American author Beverly Cleary. It is the fifth book in the Ramona series, following Ramona and Her Father (1977). In the book, seven-year-old Ramona Quimby, her sister Beezus, and their mother Dorothy deal with new challenges at home and at school. The book won the 1981 National Book Award for Children's Books in the paperback category. (Note: From 1980 to 1983 in National Book Award history, there were dual awards for hardcover and paperback books in many categories. Almost all of the paperback award-winners were reprints.)

== Plot summary ==
At last, Ramona's father, Robert, has a job again, so the Quimbys host a brunch to celebrate. Ramona is burdened with the task of keeping her friend Howie Kemp's little sister, Willa Jean, out of everybody's way. Not wanting Willa Jean to touch any of her toys, Ramona gives Willa Jean a pop-up box of tissues to play with. When Willa Jean strews tissues through the house, the guests decide to take their leave. When someone remarks that Ramona was just like Willa Jean when she was younger, Ramona feels hurt and upset, not believing that she was ever such an exasperating spoiled pest. When Dorothy states that she could not get along without Beezus, Ramona feels isolated and unappreciated by her family.

Now that both Dorothy and Robert are working full-time, everyone must pitch in to keep the house running as smoothly as possible. One day, the family comes home late to find that, in the rush to leave the house in the morning, the slow cooker was left unplugged, forcing the family to improvise dinner from the sparse assortment of ingredients on hand. The preparation of the meal causes an argument between Robert and Dorothy, culminating in Dorothy swatting Robert on the seat of the pants with a spatula. This frightens the girls, who had never before seen such behavior from their parents. Suddenly worried that their parents might get a divorce like some of their classmates' parents have recently, Beezus and Ramona comfort each other that night at bedtime, and Beezus tells Ramona that she will always be there to look after her. The next morning, Beezus and Ramona are surprised to find their parents sitting at breakfast together, acting as if the argument never happened. Robert and Dorothy explain that marital spats are a part of life and do not necessarily foreshadow a divorce. When it is further indicated that Beezus and Ramona fight, Ramona feels that the comparison is unfair and orders her parents to never fight again.

Tempers flare again when Beezus refuses to let Dorothy cut Beezus' hair. Dorothy normally cuts her daughters' hair, but Beezus reveals that she has saved her allowance to get her hair cut at a local hairdressing academy. The battle of wills between Beezus and Dorothy makes Ramona happy, since she is still envious of their relationship. When the appointment goes wrong and Ramona ends up with a cute pixie haircut and Beezus gets a bad perm and ends up with "forty-year-old" hair, Ramona suddenly feels bad for Beezus and decides it is nicer when everyone in the family is happy.

Matters become complicated once more when Dorothy buys Ramona a new pair of pajamas, the first time Ramona has not received Beezus' hand-me-downs. Ramona loves her new pajamas so much that she wears them to school underneath her clothes. She finally admits this fact to her teacher, Mrs. Rudge, who promises Ramona that she will not reveal Ramona's secret to anybody. When Ramona overhears Dorothy's end of a phone conversation with Mrs. Rudge that night, however, she mistakenly assumes that Mrs. Rudge has betrayed her confidence. She becomes angry, argues with her parents, and decides to run away from home. Dorothy, to Ramona's shock, offers to help her pack a suitcase. However, Dorothy purposefully packs the suitcase so that it is too heavy for Ramona to carry, which turns out to be a ploy to get Ramona to stay. When Ramona realizes that she had been tricked, Dorothy says the words that Ramona had longed to hear since the day of the brunch and Willa Jean's tissue incident: "I couldn't get along without my Ramona."

== Critical reaction ==
Ramona and Her Mother was well received. Reviewers appreciated Cleary's keen understanding of childhood. Kirkus writes that "Cleary's pipeline to childhood as faithful as ever... Ramona's friends will be gratified to see her coming along, and even her lapses remain endearing." Alexandra Gomez of the New York Public Library, speaking of the Spanish translation of the book, says Ramona, "in her own inimitable and highly entertaining way, tries to understand the world around her and overcome the difficult situations in her life... In any language, children will relate to this winning heroine." Finally, another reviewer praises the author's humor and sensitivity. "In this amusing and heartwarming Ramona… Beverly Cleary continues her story of Ramona, the little girl who is always full of surprises. Growing up… can be difficult. Beverly Cleary addresses this issue with humor and sensitivity, helping children to understand that they are not alone when they feel left out."

== Editions ==
Ramona and Her Mother was released on audiobook via cassette, CD, and eAudiobook from Random House/Listening Library. Braille versions were available from Dell, large print books through Professional Services Center for the Visually Handicapped, and e-Books through HarperCollins; As of 2010, 109 editions of Ramona and Her Mother had been published in 9 languages.
