= Fifteen (novel) =

1956 novel by Beverly Cleary

- First edition
- Author: Beverly Cleary
- Illustrator: Joe and Beth Krush
- Language: English
- Series: First Love
- Publisher: William Morrow & Co.
- Publication date: September 1, 1956
- Publication place: United States
- OCLC: 429362334

Fifteen is a juvenile fiction novel written by Beverly Cleary. It was first published in 1956. It chronicles the perspective of a teenage girl entering her first romantic relationship. The book captures the innocent spirit of life in the 1950s, both through the playfully light storyline and the casual references to convertibles, sweaters, "meeting boys", and soda shops. Regardless, the book remains in print today because its overall theme of difficult adolescent feelings still connects with young readers.

In 1958 Fifteen was awarded the Dorothy Canfield Fisher Children's Book Award, after Vermont school children in fourth through eighth grade chose it as their favorite novel.

== Plot ==
Jane Purdy is a 15-year-old student at Woodmont High School in California. She dreams of having a boyfriend like blonde, popular, and sophisticated 16-year-old Marcy Stokes has. Jane feels somewhat left out of social circles at her high school, and envies the more popular girls who go out on dates, seem more confident and wear more expensive clothes.

One day while babysitting, Jane meets 16-year-old Stan Crandall, who is a delivery boy for a pet-food store. Jane is immediately attracted to Stan, although she does not believe that he will be attracted to her, because she is ordinary. However, Stan calls her later and asks her out on a date to the movies.

After school begins, Jane learns that Stan has another date named Bitsy for the first school dance. This upsets Jane, but it turns out that Stan asked Bitsy to the dance before he met Jane and he feels he can't break the date. After the dance, Stan tells Jane about his time with Bitsy, saying that she made fun of his job. Stan turned pale before saying goodbye to Jane. Later, her best friend Julie calls Jane on the phone to tell her Stan was rushed to the hospital and had his appendix out.

In the end, Stan reassures Jane that she is his girlfriend, and gives her his ID bracelet as a symbol that they are going steady.

== Characters ==
Jane Purdy: Jane is the 15-year-old protagonist in Fifteen. She has brown hair, which she finds childish compared to Marcy's blonde hair, and a pretty but small wardrobe with only one cashmere sweater. She is surprised to meet Stan Crandall and happy to start a relationship with him. Jane works part-time as a babysitter. She describes herself as an ordinary girl with nothing special. She doesn't like Marcy Stokes, the popular girl in her school. While dating Stan, Jane discovers that she doesn't have to compare herself unfavorably to Marcy, and her confidence increases. Jane is a sophomore at her high school.

Stanley "Stan" Crandall: Stan is a handsome 16-year-old who works at the Doggie Diner, a pet-food delivery shop. He had recently moved to Woodmont from the city and soon starts a relationship with Jane, and tells her he thinks she's different from most girls. Their relationship is strained for a short period of time, but in the end, he assures her that everything is okay before kissing her. Stan has brown hair, green eyes, tanned skin, and is described as good looking and friendly. He's a junior at his high school.

Julie: Julie is Jane's best friend. She has freckles on her face and it's hinted that she may be overweight, as she has a hard time dieting and often tries to wear clothes that make her look thinner. She goes to the dance with Buzz, starting a possible relationship with him. She's also a sophomore and 15 years old like Jane.

Marcy Stokes: Marcy is 16 years old and the ultimate "guy's girl" or as Jane puts it, "the cashmere sweater type" (the latest high school trend at their school). She has blonde hair which she always tosses in front of boys, as well as a stylish wardrobe with several cashmere sweaters. Marcy likes to make Jane feel little and takes any chance to embarrass her. Although she is dating Greg, she is jealous of Jane's relationship with Stan.

Buzz Bratton: Buzz is an inch shorter than Jane and Julie, even though he is a junior and 16 years old. He likes Jane and even kisses her, upsetting Stan. When Jane and Buzz were in middle school, he would tackle her and steal the dishes she would prepare in cooking class and take home for her folks to taste.

Gregory "Greg" Donahoe: He's 16 years old and Marcy's boyfriend. He seems to be good friends with Jane and Stan.

Mr. Purdy He is Jane's father. He enjoys his begonia garden and his cat, Sir Puss. Jane dislikes how he tries to joke and talk too much, especially around Stan.

Mrs. Purdy: She is Jane's mother. Jane dislikes how she acts overprotective and never wears stockings on her legs.

Mr. Nibley: Mr. Nibley is the owner of the popular Nibley's Ice Cream Parlor. Jane thinks he treats her like she's still 11 years old.

Bitsy: Stan's former girlfriend who is short and makes fun of Stan's job.

Sandra Norton: The brattiest girl in all of Woodmont. She has a mother who pays much money for babysitters for her monster child. Sandra and her family are from France, and she likes Julie better than Jane.

Nadine: The "bookworm" and Jane's easiest babysitting job. She does nothing but sit and read books, making her no trouble to sit with.

George: He's had a major crush on Jane. He is two inches shorter than Jane. He's 15 years old and a sophomore. George carries his money in a purse, is obsessed with science and is about as romantic as a math test.

Tom: Tom is Stan's friend from his old school. He works in Chinatown.
