= Eliza T. Dresang =

American professor of Library Science

Eliza Timberlake Dresang (October 21, 1941 – April 21, 2014) was an American professor of Library Science who studied fundamental changes in children's literature because of digital format. Dresang was the Beverly Cleary Professor in Children and Youth Services at the University of Washington Information School. She died on April 21, 2014, in Seattle.

== Career ==
Dresang received a bachelor's degree from Emory University and a master's degree in Library Science from the University of California, Los Angeles. In 1981, she earned a Ph.D. from the University of Wisconsin–Madison School of Library and Information Studies. While at the University of Wisconsin, Dresang worked with the UW–Madison Cooperative Children's Book Center. She also worked as the Director of Library Media and Technology for the Madison, Wisconsin Metropolitan School District and taught courses in children's and young-adult literature. Dresang taught at Florida State University, where she was the Eliza Gleason Atkins Professor in the College of Information. In January 2009, Dresang assumed the Beverly Cleary Professorship in Children and Youth Services at the University of Washington Information School.

Dresang was active with the American Library Association. She served on the Newbery Award, Jane Addams Children's Book Award, Caldecott Award, and Batchelder Award Committees.

Dresang published numerous papers and books. Her 1999 book Radical Change: Books for Youth in a Digital Age is cited for its "Radical Change Theory" which posits a positive fundamental shift in reading interaction for children because of digital books and hypertext formats.

== Awards and recognition ==
- University of Wisconsin School of Library and Information Distinguished Alumna/Alumnus Award 2001
- American Library Association Scholastic Library Publishing Award 2007

== Selected works ==
- Dresang, Eliza T.(1977). “There Are No Other Children: Special Children in Library Media Centers.” School Library Journal 24, no. 1 (September 1977): 19–23.
- Dresang, E.T. (1999). Radical Change: Books for Youth in a Digital Age. H.W. Wilson, New York.
- Dresang, E.T.(2003). "Controversial books and contemporary children," Journal of Children's Literature, 29, pp. 20–31.
- Dresang, E.T., Gross, M., & Holt, L.E. (2003). "Project CATE: Using outcome measures to assess school-age children's use of technology in urban public libraries: A collaborative research process," Library and Information Science Research, 25, pp. 19–42.
- Dresang, E.T. (2005). "The information-seeking behavior of youth in the digital environment," Library Trends 54, pp. 178–196.
- Dresang, E.T. (2007). "New perspectives: an analysis of gender, net-generation children, and computers," Library Trends, 56, pp. 360–386.
- Dresang, E. T. (2008). Radical change revisited: Dynamic digital age books for youth. Contemporary Issues in Technology and Teacher Education, 8. Retrieved from Here
- Dresang, Eliza T., and Kyungwon Koh.(2009) “Radical Change Theory, Youth Information Behavior, and School Libraries.” Library Trends 58, no. 1 (Summer 2009): 26–50. https://doi.org/10.1353/lib.0.0070.
- Dresang, Eliza T.(2013). “Digital Age Libraries and Youth: Learning Labs, Literacy Leaders, Radical Resources.” In The Information Behavior of a New Generation: Children and Teens in the 21st Century, edited by Andrew Large and Jamshid Beheshti, 93–116. Lanham, MD: Scarecrow Press, 2013.
