= Ramona (1988 TV series) =

Canadian television series (1988–1989)

- title logo
- Based on: Ramona by Beverly Cleary
- Developed by: Cecily Truett; Hugh Martin
- Starring: Sarah Polley
- Opening theme: "Ramona Q" by Lee Ritenour (Canada only) "Ramona Q (Instrumental)" (United States and overseas only)
- Ending theme: "Ramona Q" by Lee Ritenour (Canada only) "Ramona Q (Instrumental)" (United States and overseas only)
- Composer: Fred Mollin
- Country of origin: Canada
- Original language: English
- No. of seasons: 1
- No. of episodes: 10

Production
- Running time: 27 minutes
- Production companies: Ramona Productions; Atlantis Films

Original release
- Network: CHCH, PBS
- Release: September 10, 1988 – January 21, 1989

Ramona is a Canadian children's television series which followed the life of eight-year-old title character Ramona Quimby (Sarah Polley). It was based on the Ramona book series by Beverly Cleary.

The series debuted on September 10, 1988, and its ten episodes spanned four months on CHCH in Canada. The show aired on PBS in the United States. It was released on video by Lorimar Home Video. After that was acquired by Warner Communications, it continued on Warner Home Video.

== Premise ==
Eight-year-old Ramona Quimby feels that no one really understands her. She's bright, imaginative, and according to her older sister, Beezus, a "pest". Every day she tries to find out more about herself and her world, with an asserted optimism. The series follows Ramona's adventures in school and at home as her family struggles with financial woes and the coming of a new baby.

== Cast ==
=== Main cast ===
- Sarah Polley as Ramona Quimby
- Lynda Mason Green as Dorothy Day Quimby
- Lori Chodos as Beatrice "Beezus" Quimby
- Barry Flatman as Robert "Bob" Quimby

=== Recurring cast ===
- Bobby Becken as Howie Kemp
- Kirsten Bishop as Beatrice "Bea" Day Kemp
- Jayne Eastwood as Mrs. Whaley
- Barclay Hope as Hobart Kemp
- Helen Hughes as Mrs. Kemp
- Nicole Lyn as Susan Kushner
- Kerry Segal as Marsha
- Marlow Vella as Daniel "Yard Ape"
- Nerene Virgin as Mrs. Larson

== Episodes ==
No.	Title	Directed by	Written by	Original release date
1	"Squeakerfoot"	Randy Bradshaw	Ellis Weiner	September 10, 1988
Ramona wears a new noisy pair of shoes for her first day of third grade, she overhears her teacher Mrs. Whaley say that she is a nuisance, which bothers her.
2	"Mystery Meal"	Randy Bradshaw	Ellis Weiner	September 17, 1988
Ramona and Beezus are grossed out from eating cow tongue for dinner, offending Dorothy and Bob. They then agree to make dinner the next night.
3	"Ramona the Patient"	Randy Bradshaw	Mark Saltzman	October 8, 1988
Ramona is embarrassed after throwing up in class.
4	"Rainy Sunday"	Randy Bradshaw	Ellis Weiner	October 21, 1988
A rainy day has the Quimbys stuck inside the house. When the storm passes, the Quimbys go a restaurant where they are greeted with the kindness of a stranger.
5	"Goodbye, Hello"	Randy Bradshaw	Mark Saltzman	October 28, 1988
Ramona and Beezus find out their house cat has died. Dorothy reveals that she is pregnant.
6	"New Pajamas"	Randy Bradshaw	Mike Eisman	November 12, 1988
Ramona becomes obsessed with her new pajamas to the point that she wears them under her clothes in school.
7	"Ramona's Bad Day"	Randy Bradshaw	Ellen Schecter & Mark Eisman	December 17, 1988
After having a bad day at school and at a friend's house, Ramona then comes home and sees her parents fighting fearing that they might get a divorce.
8	"The Great Hair Argument"	Randy Bradshaw	Sid Fleischman	December 31, 1988
Ramona and Beezus are tired of Dorothy cutting their hair, they then go to the salon to get their hair done.
9	"The Perfect Day"	Randy Bradshaw	Sid Fleischman	January 7, 1989
Aunt Bea and Uncle Hobart are getting married, when everything goes wrong for the big day, it's up to Ramona to come to the rescue.
10	"Siblingitis"	Randy Bradshaw	Mark Saltzman & Mike Eisman	January 21, 1989
Dorothy goes into labour and Ramona is sad that she is not allowed to visit her mom at the hospital to see the new baby.

== See also ==
- Ramona and Beezus
- Ramona Quimby
- Ramona series
- Beezus Quimby
- Mr. Robert Quimby
- Beverly Cleary - author of the Ramona series
