= Otis Spofford =

1953 children's novel by Beverly Cleary

- First edition
- Author: Beverly Cleary
- Illustrator: Louis Darling
- Language: English
- Genre: Children's novel
- Publisher: William Morrow & Co.
- Publication date: 1953
- Publication place: United States
- Media type: Print (Hardback)
- Pages: 191
- OCLC: 299530

Otis Spofford is a 1953 children's novel by Beverly Cleary.

The story revolves around the antics of the title character, a precocious fourth-grader with a knack for getting into trouble. Otis lives with his mother, who is often absent from the household due to teaching classes at her dance school, and therefore Otis is required to entertain himself, by "stirring up a little excitement". His trademarks are his glow-in-the-dark shoelaces (one pink, one green), the rabbit's foot he keeps attached to his jacket zipper, and his particular fondness for irritating his classmate Ellen Tebbits although he never understands the reason for it.

== Plot summary ==
Otis Spofford is a young boy with a propensity for causing trouble. He is an only child and he lives with his mother. One of the reasons why Otis likes to cause trouble is because he yearns to make life more exciting. Unfortunately, his behavior means that he does not have any close friends and his classmates are reluctant to form close bonds with him. The book is also about how Otis torments his classmate, Ellen Tebbits. He annoys her because she performs well in school and exhibits excellent behavior. Thus, Ellen is often the victim of Otis's bad behavior.

Each chapter revolves around a prank from Otis, which often backfires. In one instance, he sabotages the class's science project, which consists of feeding cafeteria food to one rat and bread and soda to another, and monitoring their growth. Otis feeds the underfed rat himself, hoping that it will get soda pop served in the cafeteria. His teacher, Mrs. Gitler, becomes wise to this and tries to get the culprit to confess. Otis opens his mouth and is stunned when Ellen steps forward. Ellen was secretly feeding the rat as well. Subsequently, Ellen is allowed to take the rat home at the experiment's end, much to Otis's displeasure (although she gives it to him when her mother will not allow her to keep it).

Otis's pranks are typically innocuous, such as firing spitballs in class. Near the end of the book he finally "gets his comeuppance," as Mrs. Gitler has long predicted. In order to impress his classmates on a dare, he cuts off a chunk of Ellen's hair, which she had been painstakingly trying to grow "long enough for pigtails". This act turns nearly the entire class against him, and for the first time, Otis does not relish the attention he receives from his actions. Otis eventually feels terrible about what he did to Ellen when she bursts into tears and flees the classroom.

Ellen and her best friend Austine manage an act of retribution by stealing Otis's shoes while he is skating at the pond, forcing him to walk home in his ice skates. The two girls later accost a dejected Otis on the steps of his apartment and offer him his shoes in exchange for an apology to Ellen, and a promise that he will stop pestering her. Otis concedes, but only after the girls are leaving reveals he had two fingers crossed behind his back the entire time.

== Critical reception ==
The book was described by Karen MacPherson of the Pittsburgh Post-Gazette in 2001 as one of Cleary's best but most overlooked books.
