= Ramona and Her Father =

1977 novel by Beverly Cleary

- First edition cover with the Newbery Honor
- Author: Beverly Cleary
- Illustrator: Alan Tiegreen (first edition); Tracy Dockray (second edition); Jacqueline Rogers (third edition)
- Language: English
- Series: Ramona
- Genre: Children's novel
- Publisher: William Morrow
- Publication date: 1977
- Publication place: United States
- Media type: Print
- Pages: 186 pp
- ISBN: 0-688-22114-9
- OCLC: 28448197
- Preceded by: Ramona the Brave
- Followed by: Ramona and Her Mother

Ramona and Her Father is a 1977 children's novel by American author Beverly Cleary. It is the fourth book in the Ramona series, following Ramona the Brave (1975). In the novel, when Mr. Quimby loses his job, Ramona thinks up ways to earn money and help her family out. The first edition of the book was illustrated by Alan Tiegreen, with later editions by Tracy Dockray. Ramona and Her Father was well received and became a Newbery Honor Book in 1978.

== Plot summary ==
Ramona Quimby is now in second grade. In September, the Quimby family is set back when Mr. Quimby is laid off after the company he worked for was bought out. Though Mrs. Quimby finds a full-time job, the family struggles to keep up with their tax payments and Mr. Quimby sinks into depression, constantly filling out job applications, collecting unemployment insurance and smoking while watching television. A commercial for the Whopperburger, Ramona's favorite restaurant, featuring a boy Ramona's age inspires her to try to become a child star herself to help the family's finances, so she memorizes various lines from commercials featuring children, but she lands herself in an embarrassing scenario when she uses a line from a commercial where a girl compares her mother's pantyhose to an elephant's legs on her teacher, Mrs. Rogers, offending her. While her father attends a parent-teacher conference, Ramona sneaks off and finds some burs that she connects to make a crown to imitate a gag from another commercial, but the crown does not come off after Ramona puts it on and Mr. Quimby is forced to cut off the bur-connected hairs. As Halloween approaches, Mr. Quimby carves Ramona her own jack-o'-lantern, but family cat Picky-Picky eats the pumpkin the following morning, much to Ramona's dismay.

Ramona grows concerned about her father's smoking habit and works with Beezus to leave messages all over the house, reminding Mr. Quimby of the consequences of smoking. To Ramona's chagrin, Mr. Quimby is only annoyed with the messages. After her father is late coming home after she is out of school, Ramona breaks down in tears and fears her father has left the family, but he arrives and reveals he was in a long line collecting his unemployment insurance. Ramona feels better when Mr. Quimby invites her to draw with him and agrees to stop smoking.

That Christmas, Beezus and Ramona participate in their church's Christmas pageant. Beezus is to be the Virgin Mary and Ramona and her friends Howie and Davy are cast as sheep. Unfortunately, Mrs. Quimby does not have time to sew a costume, and Ramona is frustrated with her father after she misunderstands a conversation between her parents and catches him smoking; he apologizes, and assures her they are a happy family despite their financial difficulties. Mr. Quimby finds a new job at a supermarket, much to the family's relief. However, as her mother could not sew a costume in time, Ramona has to wear a pair of old pajamas, which she hates. In the end, the sheep steal the show and Ramona and her family share a wonderful night together.

== Reception ==
Ramona and Her Father was a 1978 Newbery Honor book. Kirkus Reviews gave it a starred review for "books of remarkable merit", citing Cleary's ability to accurately convey the concerns of children, including Ramona's feelings about her father's smoking. Scholastic's review also pointed out Cleary's ability to portray children's troubles, saying, "Cleary has a perfect instinct for expressing the mixed emotions that inform children's actions" Children's Literature agreed, "Beverly Cleary's books are always funny and insightful." In 2012 it was ranked number 94 on a list of the top 100 children's novels published by School Library Journal.

== Characters ==
- Beatrice "Beezus" Quimby – Older sister who is in seventh grade.
- Mrs. Quimby – Mother Dorothy.
- Mr. Quimby – Father Robert.
- Howard "Howie" Kemp – Ramona's friend since Beezus and Ramona.
- Picky Picky – The Quimby's old yellow cat who is 11.
- Mrs. Rogers – Ramona's second grade teacher.
- David "Davy" – A boy who Ramona tried to kiss in Ramona the Pest and tried to help with school work in Ramona the Brave.
- Mrs. Russo – Ramona's Sunday school teacher.
- Willa Jean – Howie's little sister since Beezus and Ramona.
- Mrs. Kemp – Howie's mother since Beezus and Ramona.
- Mrs. Swink – An old lady whom Ramona and Beezus go visit for an interview for Beezus' creative writing. She gave Ramona the idea for tin can stilts.
- Margarine Boy – A boy Ramona's age in a commercial.

== Awards and nominations ==
- Newbery Honor Book
- Land of Enchantment Book Award (New Mexico)
- Texas Bluebonnet Award
- Nene Award (Hawaii)
- Beehive Award (Utah)
- IRA/CBC Children's Choice

== Adaptation ==
In 1978, the same year the book became a Newbery Honor Book, Random House recorded a dramatization of the book. Narrated by John Stratton, the dramatization featured Sarah Jessica Parker as Ramona, Keith Charles as Father, Karen Dahle as Mother, Kathy Gene as Beezus, Gian Carlo as Howie, Eleanor Phelps as Mrs. Swink and Denise Moses as a girl in the Christmas pageant.

== Editions ==
Ramona and Her Father was released as an audiobook via cassette, CD and eAudiobook from Random House/Listening Library. As of 2010, 121 editions of Ramona and Her Father had been published in 11 languages.
