= Beverly Cleary =

American writer (1916–2021)

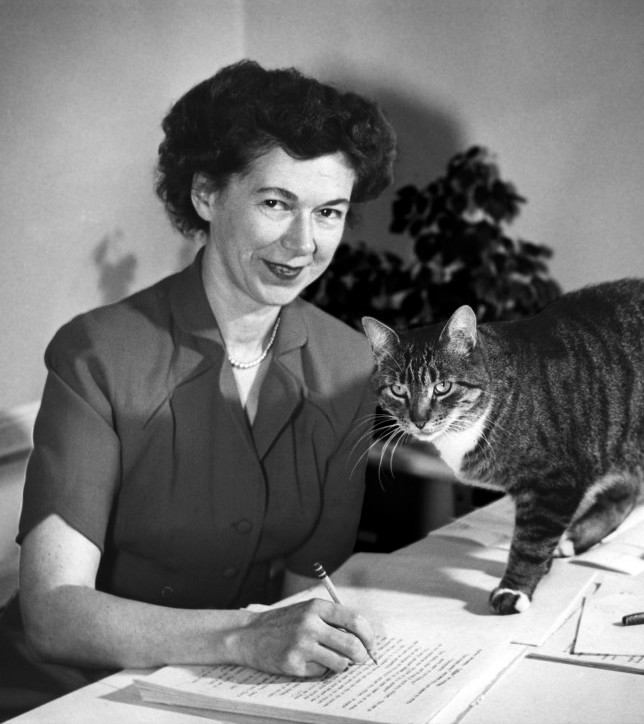
- Cleary and her cat, "Kitty" c. 1955
- Born: Beverly Atlee Bunn; April 12, 1916 McMinnville, Oregon, U.S.
- Died: March 25, 2021 (aged 104) Carmel-by-the-Sea, California, U.S.
- Resting place: Pike Cemetery, Yamhill, Oregon
- Occupation: Writer and librarian
- Language: English
- Education: University of California, Berkeley (B.A.); University of Washington (B.A.)
- Years active: 1950–2005
- Notable works: Henry Huggins series; Ramona series; The Mouse and the Motorcycle; Dear Mr. Henshaw
- Notable awards: Laura Ingalls Wilder Award (1975); National Book Award (1981); Newbery Medal (1984); National Medal of Arts (2003)
- Spouse: Clarence Cleary (m. 1940; died 2004)
- Children: 2

Website
- beverlycleary.com

Beverly Atlee Cleary (née Bunn; April 12, 1916 – March 25, 2021) was an American writer of children's and young adult fiction. She was one of America's most successful authors: 91 million copies of her books have been sold worldwide since her first book was published in 1950. Some of her best known characters are Ramona Quimby and Beezus Quimby, Henry Huggins and his dog Ribsy, and Ralph S. Mouse.

The majority of Cleary's books are set in the Grant Park neighborhood of northeast Portland, Oregon, where she was raised, and she has been credited as one of the first authors of children's literature to figure emotional realism in the narratives of her characters, often children in middle-class families. Her first children's book was Henry Huggins, which she wrote after receiving a question from a child when Cleary was a librarian. Cleary won the 1981 National Book Award for Ramona and Her Mother (Note: Cleary won the 1981 National Book Award for paperback children's fiction. From 1980 to 1983 in National Book Award history there were dual awards for hardcover and paperback books in many categories. Most of the paperback award-winners were reprints, including Ramona and Her Mother (1979).) and the 1984 Newbery Medal for Dear Mr. Henshaw. For her lifetime contributions to American literature, she received the National Medal of Arts, recognition as a Library of Congress Living Legend, and the Laura Ingalls Wilder Medal from the Association for Library Service to Children. The Beverly Cleary School, a public school in Portland, was named after her, and several statues of her most famous characters were erected in Grant Park in 1995.

== Early life ==
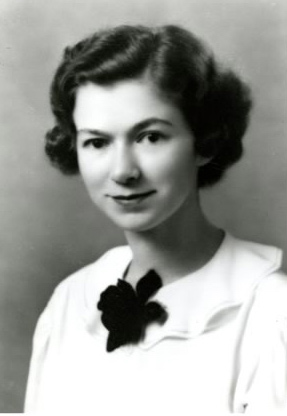
Cleary as a senior at the University of California, Berkeley, 1938

Beverly Atlee Bunn was born on April 12, 1916, in McMinnville, Oregon, to Chester Lloyd Bunn, a farmer, and Mable Atlee Bunn, a schoolteacher. Cleary was an only child and lived on a farm in rural Yamhill, Oregon, in her early childhood. She was raised Presbyterian. When she was six years old, her family moved to Portland, Oregon, where her father had secured a job as a bank security officer.

The adjustment from living in the country to the city was difficult for Cleary, and she struggled in school; in first grade, her teacher placed her in a group for struggling readers. (Note: Cleary blamed her struggles on chickenpox, smallpox, tonsillitis, a teacher who "snapp[ed] a steel-tipped pointer across the back of her hands", and a reader that she described as an "incredibly stupid" book.) Cleary said, "The first grade was sorted into three reading groups—Bluebirds, Redbirds and Blackbirds. I was a Blackbird. To be a Blackbird was to be disgraced. I wanted to read, but somehow could not."

With some work, Cleary's reading skills improved, but she eventually found reading boring, complaining that many stories were simple and unsurprising, and wondering why authors often did not write with humor or about ordinary people. However, on a rainy afternoon at home during Cleary's third-grade year, she found herself enjoying reading The Dutch Twins, a book by Lucy Fitch Perkins about the adventures of ordinary children. The book was an epiphany for her, and afterward, she started to spend a lot of time reading and at the library. By sixth grade, a teacher suggested that Cleary should become a children's writer based on essays she had written for class assignments.

After graduating from Portland's Grant High School in 1934, Cleary entered Chaffey Junior College in Ontario, California, which offered lower tuition fees than four-year universities, something many students needed during the Great Depression, with aspirations of becoming a children's librarian. After two years at Chaffey, she was accepted to the University of California, Berkeley, where she earned a Bachelor of Arts degree in English in 1938. While in college, Cleary worked odd jobs to pay her tuition, including working as a seamstress and a chambermaid. During what Cleary described as "two of the most interesting years of my life", she was one of the first residents of women's cooperative Stebbins Hall, and met her future husband, Clarence Cleary, at a school dance. In 1939, she graduated from the School of Librarianship at the University of Washington with a second bachelor's degree in library science and accepted a year-long position as a children's librarian in Yakima, Washington. Her parents disapproved of her relationship with Cleary, a Roman Catholic, so the couple eloped and were married in 1940. After World War II, they settled in Carmel-by-the-Sea, California. In 1955, Cleary gave birth to twins, Malcolm and Marianne. She lived in Carmel Valley Village in California from the 1960s onwards.

== Career ==
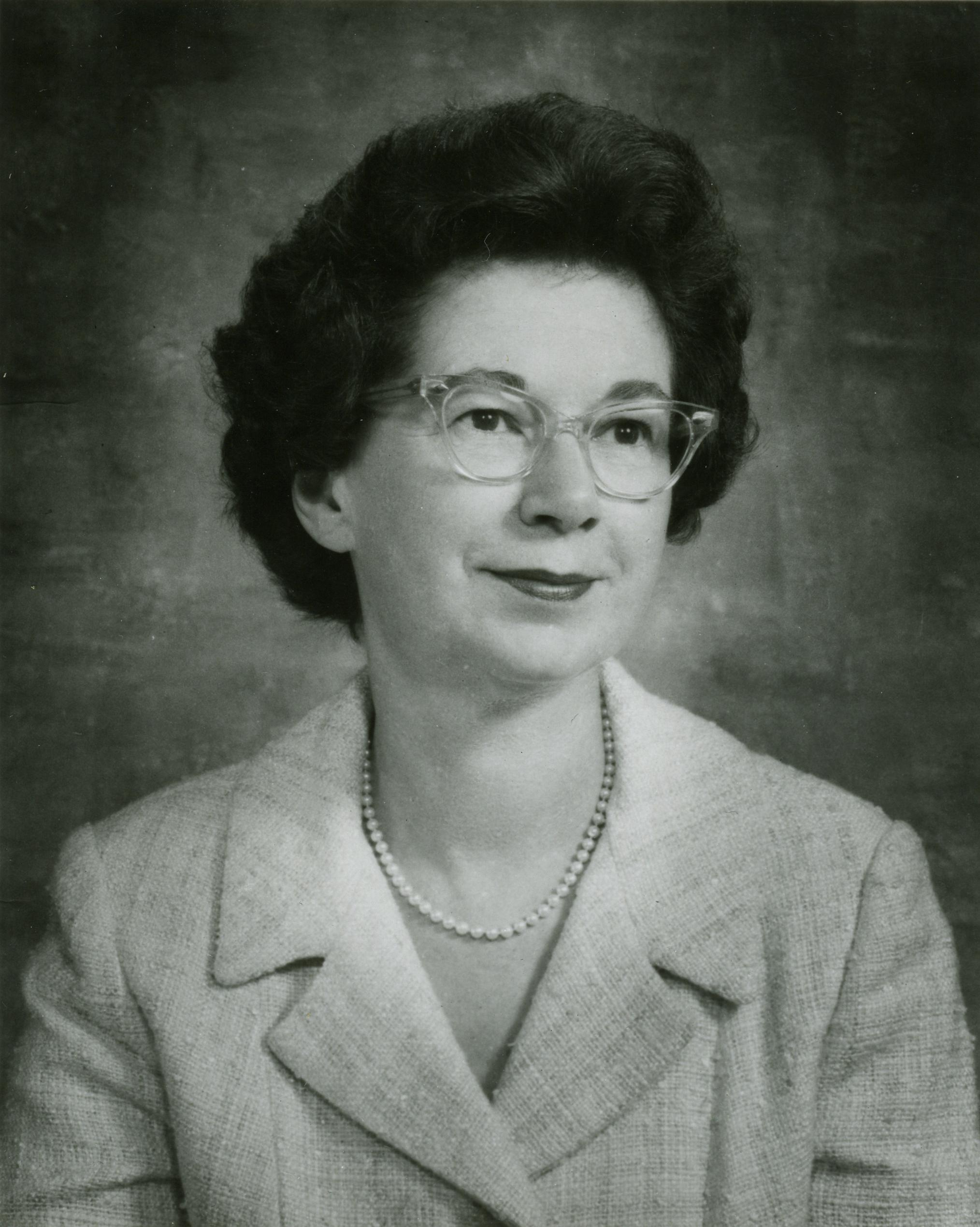
Cleary in 1971

After her graduation from the University of Washington in 1939, she served as a children's librarian in Yakima, Washington, until 1940, and then as the post librarian at the U.S. Army Hospital on Camp John T. Knight in Oakland, California, from 1942 to 1945. (Note: Camp John T. Knight was later incorporated into the Oakland Army Base in 1946.) She also worked at Sather Gate Book Shop in Berkeley before becoming a full-time writer for children.

As a children's librarian, Cleary empathized with her young patrons, who had difficulty finding books with characters they could identify with, and she struggled to find enough books to suggest that would appeal to them. After a few years of making recommendations and performing live storytelling in her role as librarian, Cleary decided to start writing children's books about characters that young readers could relate to. (Note: Although she had talked about writing books for years, Cleary did not begin writing her first book until she was in her 30s, and recalled the experience of finding a children's book with the text "Bow-wow. I like the green grass, said the puppy", a passage she found "ridiculous [since n]o puppy I had known talked like that", as a catalyst for her journey to authorship.) Cleary has said, "I believe in that 'missionary spirit' among children's librarians. Kids deserve books of literary quality, and librarians are so important in encouraging them to read and selecting books that are appropriate."

Cleary's first book, Henry Huggins (1950), was the first in a series of fictional chapter books about Henry, his dog Ribsy, his neighborhood friend Beezus and her little sister Ramona. When writing the book, Cleary took inspiration from the times she composed stories for children during Saturday afternoon story hours when she worked as a librarian in Yakima. Like many of her later works, Henry Huggins is a novel about people living ordinary lives and is based on Cleary's own childhood experiences, the kids in her neighborhood growing up, as well as children she met while working as a librarian. Although her book was accepted by Morrow, the first publisher she sent it to, it had been initially rejected, and Cleary had added the characters of Beezus and Ramona while revising it. (Note: Ramona was added as a little sister when Cleary realized that it seemed all the children in her book were only children, like herself.)

Cleary's first book to center a story on the Quimby sisters, Beezus and Ramona, was published in 1955. A publisher asked her to write a book about a kindergarten student. Cleary resisted, because she had not attended kindergarten, but later changed her mind after the birth of her twins. By 1984, her books had sold 3.5 million copies in hardback.

Cleary also wrote two memoirs, one about her childhood, entitled A Girl from Yamhill (1988), and one about her years in college and as an adult up to writing her first book, entitled My Own Two Feet (1995). During a 2011 interview for the Los Angeles Times, at age 95, Cleary stated, "I've had an exceptionally happy career."

== Critical significance ==
Cleary's books have been historically noted for their attention to the daily minutiae of childhood, specifically the experience of children growing up in middle-class families. Leonard S. Marcus, a children's literature historian, said of Cleary's work: "When you're the right age to read Cleary's books you're likely at your most impressionable time in life as a reader. [Her books] both entertain children and give them courage and insight into what to expect from their lives." Cleary's employment of humor has also been noted by critics; William Grimes of The New York Times wrote that Cleary used a "humorous, lively style" while "ma[king] compelling drama out of the everyday problems, small injustices and perplexing mysteries – adults chief among them – that define middle-class American childhood", while Roger Sutton of The Horn Book Magazine noted that "Cleary is funny in a very sophisticated way. She gets very close to satire, which I think is why adults like her, but she's still deeply respectful of her characters—nobody gets a laugh at the expense of another. I think kids appreciate that they're on a level playing field with adults."

Pat Pflieger, professor of children's literature at West Chester University, commented: "Cleary's books have lasted because she understands her audience. She knows they're sometimes confused or frightened by the world around them, and that they feel deeply about things that adults can dismiss." Eliza Dresang, professor in children and youth services at the University of Washington Information School, Cleary's alma mater, said, "Those books don't seem so radical now, but they were when she was writing them". (Note: Dresang was the incoming inaugural Beverly Cleary Professor for Children and Youth Services at the time.) Dresang added that Cleary's writing, "in terms of the topics [covered], the honesty, the accuracy, [and] the ability to portray real-life children", was decades ahead of her time. Twentieth-Century Children's Writers said, "Beverly Cleary's impact as a children's writer cannot be overestimated... her extraordinary talent in creating memorable young characters whose exuberant spirit and zest for life attract young and old readers alike."

== Later life and death ==
Cleary's husband, Clarence, died in 2004. She celebrated her 100th birthday on April 12, 2016. On March 25, 2021, Cleary died at her retirement home in Carmel-by-the-Sea, California, aged 104.

== Honors and legacy ==
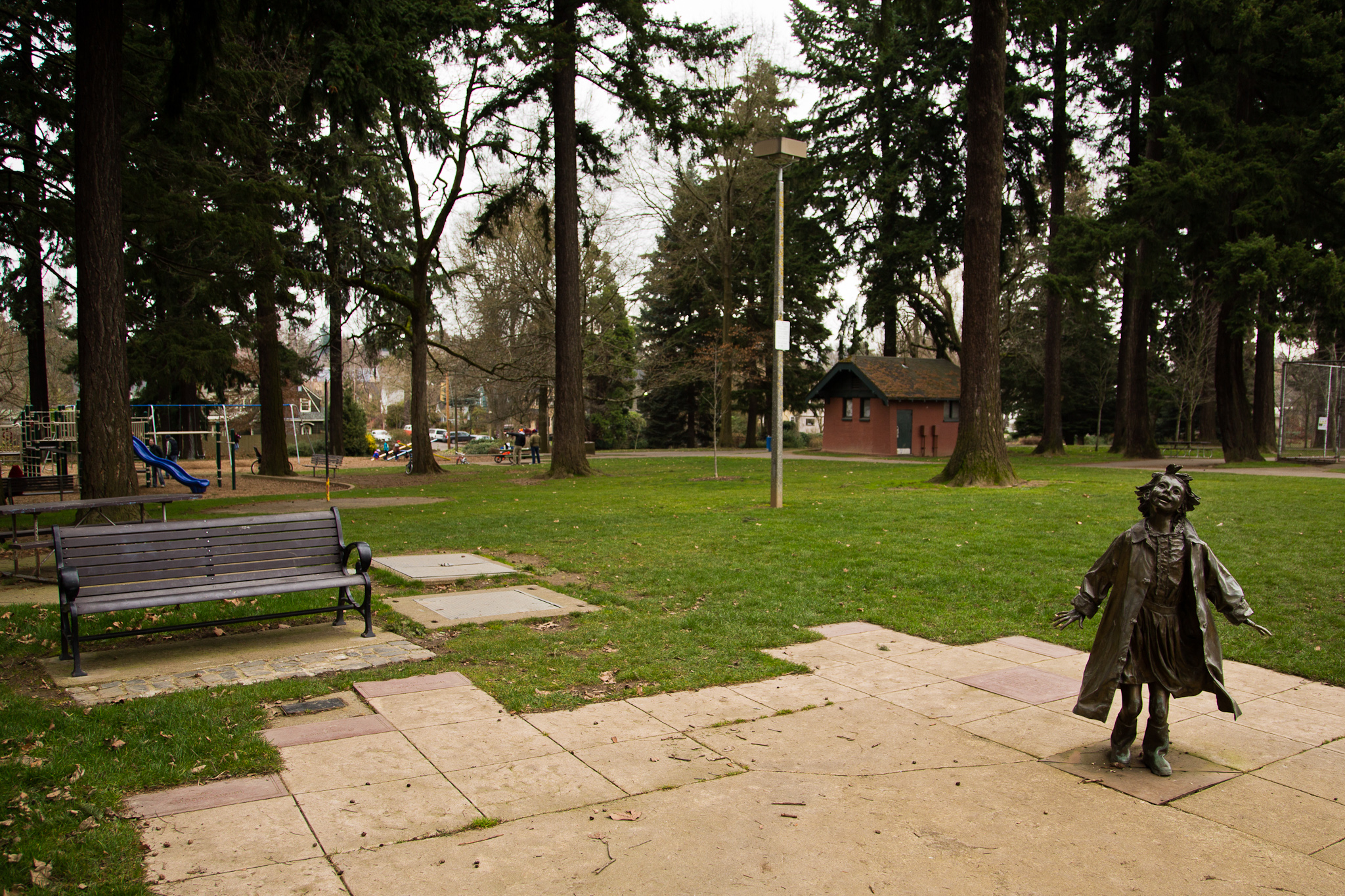
Statue of Ramona Quimby in Grant Park, Portland

In 1975, Cleary won the Laura Ingalls Wilder Award from the American Library Association for "substantial and lasting contributions to children's literature". She was the U.S. nominee for the biennial international Hans Christian Andersen Award in 1984. In April 2000, she was named Library of Congress Living Legend in the writers and artists category for her contributions to the cultural heritage of the United States. She received the National Medal of Arts in 2003.

Cleary's books have been published in over 25 different languages and have been recognized by many awards and honors. Dear Mr. Henshaw won the Newbery Medal in 1984, and Newbery Honors were conferred on Ramona and Her Father in 1978 and Ramona Quimby, Age 8 in 1982. She won the 1981 National Book Award in category children's fiction (paperback) for Ramona and Her Mother, a William Allen White Children's Book award for Socks (1973), the Catholic Library Association's Regina Medal (1980), and the Children's Book Council's Every Child Award (1985).

In 2012, Ramona the Pest was ranked number 24 among all children's novels in a survey published by the School Library Journal, a monthly with a primarily U.S. audience. The Mouse and the Motorcycle (89) and Ramona and Her Father (94) were also among the top 100.

Cleary has been mentioned as a major influence by other authors, including Laurie Halse Anderson, Judy Blume, Lauren Myracle, and Jon Scieszka.

Publisher HarperCollins recognizes Cleary's birthday, April 12, as National Drop Everything and Read (DEAR) Day, in promotion of sustained silent reading.

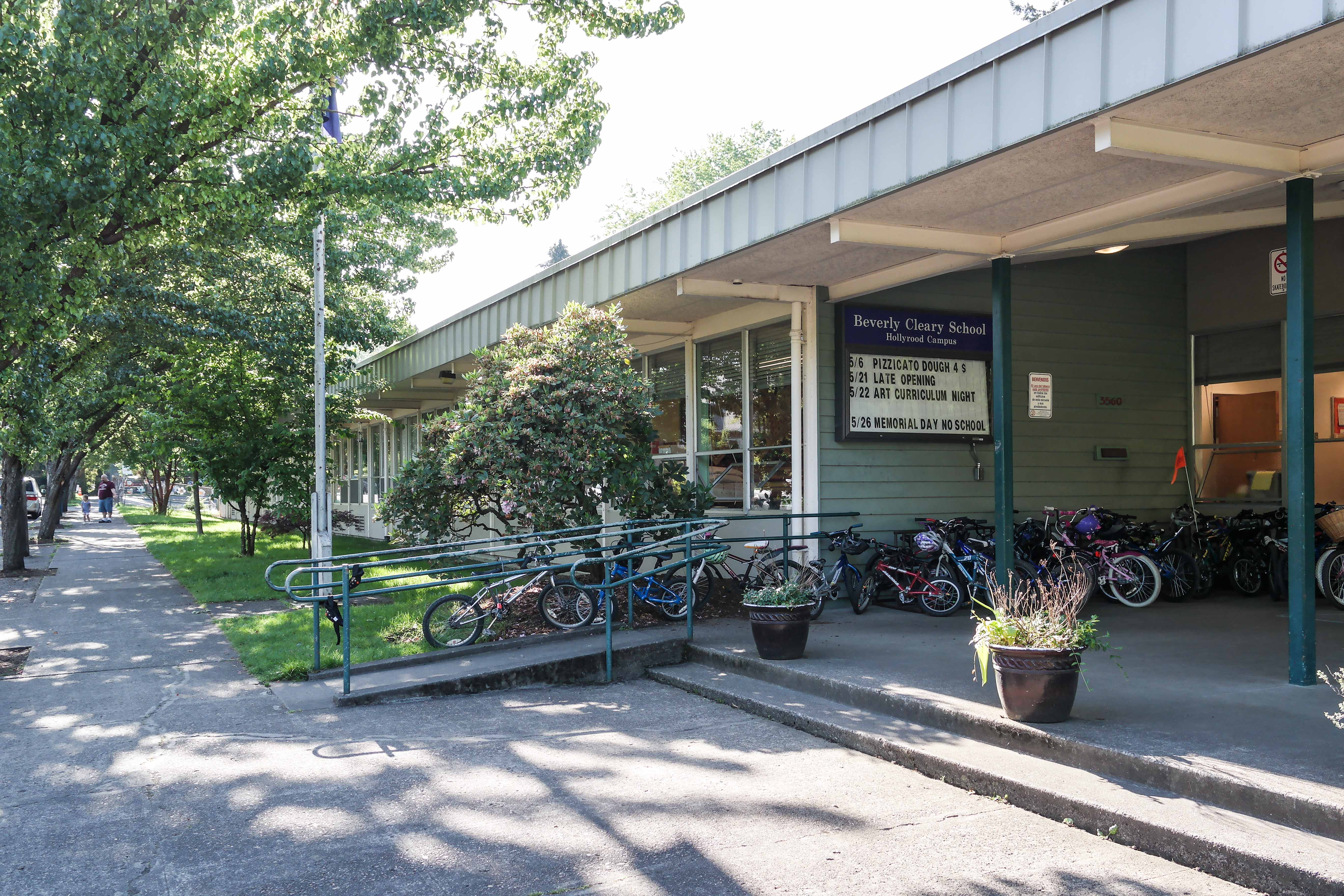
Beverly Cleary School in 2014

In Portland, Oregon, the Hollywood branch of the Multnomah County Library, near where she lived as a child, commissioned a map of Henry Huggins's Klickitat Street neighborhood for its lobby wall. Statues of her characters Henry Huggins, the Hugginses' dog Ribsy, and Ramona Quimby can be found in The Beverly Cleary Sculpture Garden for Children, which is part of Portland's Grant Park in the Hollywood-Fernwood neighborhood. In June 2008, the neighborhood's K-8 school, formerly named Fernwood Grammar School and once attended by Cleary, was officially renamed Beverly Cleary School.

In 1997, the Central Library in downtown Portland, Oregon, which serves as the main branch of the Multnomah County Library system, dedicated its children's room as the Beverly Cleary Children's Library.

In 2004, the University of Washington Information School completed fund-raising for the Beverly Cleary Endowed Chair for Children and Youth Services to honor her work and commitment to librarianship. In 2008, the school announced that she had been selected as the next recipient of the university's Alumna Summa Laude Dignatus Award, the highest honor the University of Washington can bestow on a graduate.

Cleary has a 220-student residential hall named after her, Beverly Cleary Hall, at her alma mater, the University of California, Berkeley.

In April 2016, on the occasion of her 100th birthday, Oregon Public Broadcasting produced an original half-hour program, Discovering Beverly Cleary, which included an extensive interview with Cleary at age 99 at her home in Carmel, California, and photographs and stories from her life. It was broadcast in the spring of 2016 on PBS stations across the country.

On April 22, 2021, after her death, the United States Senate passed a resolution "honoring the life and legacy of award-winning children's author Beverly Cleary." It was sponsored by Senator Ron Wyden of Oregon, Cleary's home state.

== Works ==
Key: † Henry Huggins series (1950–1964), ‡ Ramona series (1955–1999)

- Henry Huggins, Morrow, 1950 †
- Ellen Tebbits, Morrow, 1951
- Henry and Beezus, Morrow, 1952 †
- Otis Spofford, Morrow, 1953
- Henry and Ribsy, Morrow, 1954 †
- Beezus and Ramona, Morrow, 1955 ‡
- Fifteen, Morrow, 1956
- Henry and the Paper Route, Morrow, 1957 †
- The Luckiest Girl, Morrow, 1958
- Jean and Johnny, Morrow, 1959
- The Hullabaloo ABC, Parnassus, 1960
- The Real Hole, Morrow, 1960
- Leave It to Beaver, Berkley, 1960
- Beaver and Wally, Berkley, 1961
- Here's Beaver!, Berkley, 1961
- Two Dog Biscuits, Morrow, 1961
- Emily's Runaway Imagination, Morrow, 1961
- Henry and the Clubhouse, Morrow, 1962 †
- Sister of the Bride, Morrow, 1963
- Ribsy, Morrow, 1964 †
- The Mouse and the Motorcycle, Morrow, 1965
- The Growing-Up Feet, Morrow, 1967
- Mitch and Amy, Morrow, 1967
- Ramona the Pest, Morrow, 1968 ‡
- Runaway Ralph, Morrow, 1970
- Socks, Morrow, 1973
- Ramona the Brave, Morrow, 1975 ‡
- Ramona and Her Father, Morrow, 1977 ‡
- Ramona and Her Mother, Morrow, 1979 ‡
- Ramona Quimby, Age 8, Morrow, 1981 ‡
- Ralph S. Mouse, Morrow, 1982
- Dear Mr. Henshaw, Morrow, 1983
- Ramona Forever, Morrow, 1984 ‡
- The Ramona Quimby Diary, Morrow, 1984
- Lucky Chuck, Morrow, 1984
- Janet's Thingamajigs, Morrow, 1987
- A Girl from Yamhill, Morrow, 1988
- Muggie Maggie, Morrow, 1990
- Strider, Morrow, 1991
- Petey's Bedtime Story, Morrow, 1993
- My Own Two Feet, Morrow, 1995
- Ramona's World, Morrow, 1999 ‡
- Two Times the Fun (omnibus containing The Real Hole, Two Dog Biscuits, The Growing-Up Feet, and Janet's Thingamajigs), Morrow, 2005

== Adaptations ==
- Ramona (1988): Ten-part Canadian TV series starring Sarah Polley as eight-year-old Ramona Quimby.
- Ramona and Beezus (2010): Movie starring Joey King as Ramona and Selena Gomez as Beezus.

== See also ==
- List of children's literature writers
