= Ellen Tebbits =

Novel by Beverly Cleary

- First edition
- Author: Beverly Cleary
- Illustrator: Louis Darling
- Language: English
- Genre: Children's Realistic Fiction
- Publisher: William Morrow and Co.
- Publication date: 1951
- Publication place: United States
- Pages: 160

Ellen Tebbits is a 1951 children's novel written by Beverly Cleary. It is Cleary's second published book, following Henry Huggins. This humorous realistic fiction story tells the adventures of young Ellen and the new girl in her school, Austine Allen.

== Plot ==
Third-grader Ellen Tebbits lives with her parents on Tillamook Street in Portland, Oregon. The book opens when Ellen heads to her dance class at the studio run by the mother of a classmate, Otis Spofford, who is always teasing her. When she arrives, she heads to change in a broom closet so the other girls cannot see her terrible secret: Ellen is wearing woolen underwear. After class, she accidentally walks in on a new girl in class, Austine Allen, who also wears woolen underwear. Soon, the two become best friends. Other chapters in the book deal with Ellen's first-ever time going horseback riding, her efforts to bring a giant beet to school for show-and-tell, and Ellen and Austine's efforts to put up with the obnoxious Otis' antics.

During summer vacation, Ellen and Austine decide to dress as twins on their first day back to school. The plan is for their mothers to make identical dresses for them. Austine's mother, however, cannot sew, so her dress does not turn out well. As the day goes on Austine begins to amuse herself by tugging on the sash of Ellen's dress. Ellen gets irritated and finally slaps Austine in the lunch line when her sash comes undone. Unfortunately, Austine was innocent; Otis had pulled on her dress. Austine begins spending time with other girls and ignores Ellen, who thinks everyone looks down on her for slapping her best friend.

In the final chapter, the teacher chooses Ellen and Austine to go outside and clean the chalkboard erasers. Austine continues to ignore Ellen, who becomes so angered by this that she yanks on the sash on Austine's dress and rips it. Both girls end up in tears and, after learning that Otis was the culprit in the lunch line and that both of their mothers made them wear their dreaded woolen underwear that day, they mend their friendship.

== Critical reception ==
Children's Literature expert Anita Silvey calls Cleary's early books "pure, nostalgic Americana". Twentieth-Century Children's Writers says that Cleary has developed a "community of individual children with unique attributes and interests". In a starred review for "books of remarkable merit", Kirkus Reviews said of Ellen Tebbits, "It seems obvious from this entrancing successor to Henry Huggins that the author is as well acquainted with the whisperings, weeps and whoops of third grade distaff side..." Cleary's humor was noted by the Saturday Review, which said "Through all Ellen's joys and sorrows there runs a thread of humor that makes the reader chuckle even when he is sympathizing with her."
