= Socks (novel) =

Novel by Beverly Cleary

- First edition
- Author: Beverly Cleary
- Cover artist: Beatrice Darwin
- Language: English
- Publisher: William Morrow and Company (1973–1999); HarperCollins (1999–)
- Publication date: 1973
- Publication place: United States
- Media type: Print (hardback & paperback)
- Pages: 160
- ISBN: 0-688-30067-7
- OCLC: 572003
- LC Class: PZ7.C5792 So

Socks is a children's novel written by Beverly Cleary, originally illustrated by Beatrice Darwin, and published in 1973 by Morrow Books, New York. It was the recipient of the William Allen White Children's Book Award. The title character of the book would eventually become the name for Socks Clinton, the cat of U.S. President Bill Clinton and family.

== Plot summary ==
The story is told from the perspective of a tabby cat with four white paws who lives with a young married couple, Bill and Marilyn Bricker. Initially, Socks and the Bricker couple are alone, and Socks receives a great deal of love and attention as a result. However, the Brickers soon have a baby son and Socks begins to feel as though he has been forgotten. Socks receives less attention than he normally would as the Brickers now spend most of their time caring for baby Charles William. He even ends up living in the garage for a short time when his behavior is misinterpreted as changed from the sweet cat the Brickers had adopted. The only person who seems to understand that Socks is lonely and is simply curious about Charles William is the kind Mrs. Risley, who comes to babysit and lavishes Socks with attention.

Socks has several misadventures in the course of the book, the most frightening being a fight with another, more aggressive, neighborhood stray cat named Old Taylor, which leaves Socks battered, bleeding, and covered in mud. Socks meows for help and the Brickers are very startled that he has been hurt. After this takes place, the Brickers realize they have been so wrapped up with the new baby that they have forgotten Socks, and they resolve this by carefully washing the mud out of Socks' fur to remind him of their love for him. They willingly bring him back into the house but are still cautious with letting him near the baby. Shortly after being allowed back in the house, Socks is given the nickname Ticky by Charles who mispronounces kitty.

One day Charles William rocks his playpen until it blocks his room's door and traps Socks in the room with him. Happy to finally have some time with the kitty, Charles William, by this point a young toddler and much more active than he was before, begins to squeal happily and plays with Socks by pulling the stuffing from the lining of his playpen and tossing it for Socks to pounce on. Desperate to see what is happening, Marilyn runs outside and peers through the window, only to see Socks curled up by Charles William, purring, and Charles William sleeping peacefully, the pair having exhausted themselves from their little game. Socks discovers that he has a new friend in little Charles William and a new way to be part of the family. The book ends with Socks sleeping next to Charles William in his crib, Marilyn leaving them alone.
