= Emily's Runaway Imagination =

Book by Beverly Cleary

- First edition
- Author: Beverly Cleary
- Illustrator: Beth and Joe Krush
- Language: English
- Publisher: William Morrow and Co.
- Publication place: United States of America
- Media type: Print
- Pages: 221

Emily's Runaway Imagination is a children's novel by American writer Beverly Cleary, first published in 1961. Set in the 1920s, the plot follows the experiences of a young, imaginative girl named Emily over the course of a year. She eventually starts a library in her fictional hometown of Pitchfork, Oregon.

The book is notable for its portrayal of a fictional Chinese immigrant named Fong Quok, who was inspired by Quong Hop, who owned a laundry business in Yamhill County, Oregon, where Cleary grew up.

== Plot ==
Set in the small town of Pitchfork, Oregon, in the early 1900s, the story follows Emily Bartlett, a spirited and imaginative girl whose tendency to exaggerate and act on her ideas often leads to trouble. Living with her mother and younger sister after her father leaves to find work, Emily navigates school friendships, and daily life, but her runaway imagination causes a series of embarrassing misunderstandings and mishaps that affect both her family and her standing in the community. She becomes noteworthy throughout Pitchfork for the predicaments she creates, such as intoxicating her father's pigs by feeding them rotten apples to avoid a chiding from her mother for wasting food, bleaching a plow horse with Clorox to impress a visiting cousin, and humiliating herself publicly by correcting the language of a Chinese neighbor after he mispronounces the name of her pet collie.

As Emily faces the consequences of her actions through strained relationships, public embarrassment, and hard-earned lessons, she gradually begins to mature. Over time, she learns the importance of honesty, self-control, and considering others, ultimately finding a balance between her vivid imagination and a growing sense of responsibility.
