= Alan Tiegreen =

American author and Illustrator

- Born: 1935; Boise, Idaho
- Education: University of Southern Mississippi
- Occupation(s): author, illustrator
- Notable work: Ramona and Her Father
- Awards: Newberry, Young Reader's Choice, New York Times Notable, American Book Awards children's fiction paperback

Alan Tiegreen is an American author and illustrator for many children's and young adult books.

== Biography ==
Tiegreen was born in Boise, Idaho in 1935. Because his father worked for the government, they would constantly move, sending them to places like Nebraska, Alabama, and Ohio.

Tiegreen received his Bachelor of Arts degree from the University of Southern Mississippi in 1957 and his Bachelor of Professional Arts at the Art Center of Design in Los Angeles in 1961. He began teaching at Georgia State University in 1965.

Tiegreen's paintings can be found at the Smithsonian Institution in Washington, D. C., the Knoxville World's Fair, and in New York City, Atlanta, and Los Angeles. He has received multiple awards and honors, most notably his Newbery Medal for the book, Ramona and Her Father.
