= Jacqueline Rogers =

American children's-book illustrator (born 1958)

Jacqueline Rogers (born 1958) is an American children's-book illustrator.

== Early life and education ==
Rogers was the youngest of six children, and grew up in a family of artists in Westport, Connecticut. She attended the Rhode Island School of Design, first majoring in painting before switching to illustration. When she realized the world of illustration was changing, she learned software such as PhotoShop and Illustrator at the Berkshire Community College.

== Career ==
Rogers has been an illustrator for over 35 years, and has created book covers and illustrations for over 150 books. For various projects, Roger uses old pictures of her now grown children, in various outfit changes, for inspiration for many of the characters she illustrates.
Rogers has also used her drawing skills to create book apps, such as The Unwanted Guest (2011), described by one reviewer as "one of the most breathtaking story apps ... to date", with "graphics that are truly amazing ... the evocative images seem to move all around you. Depicted mostly in grayscale with just a touch of color, the app features randomly selected alternative views, sounds and animations, so that no two viewings .. are the same."

Today, although still illustrating other authors' works, Rogers paints in oil in her spare time and focuses on writing her own children's books. She currently resides in Spencertown, New York.

=== Selected works ===
HarperCollins Publishers:

- Goblin Moon, expected July 2019
- Ramona Series, written by Beverly Cleary
- Ralph S. Mouse Series, written by Beverly Cleary
- Dixies Series, written by Grace Gilman
- Little Red Series, written by Ree Drummond
- Our Great Big Backyard, written by Jenna Bush Hager and Laura Bush

Holiday House:

- One Tractor, written by Alexandra Siy
- There Goes Lowell's Party!, written by Esther Hershenhorn

Scholastic:

- I Am Blessed, written by Grace Maccarone
- Five Bouncing Bunnies, written by Lily Karr
- The Littlest Christmas Tree, written by R. A. Herman
- Baby Signs, written by Kyle Olman
- The Ghost of Sifty Sifty Sam, written by Angela Shelf Medearis
- Even More Short & Shivery, written by Robert D. San Souci
- Calvin Coconut Series, written by Graham Salisbury

Other:

- A Blossom Promise, written by Betsy Byars
- Max and the Baby-Sitter, written by Danielle Steel
- Martha's Best Friend, written by Danielle Steel
- I Want To Say I Love You, written by Caralyn Buehner

Written and illustrated by Jacqueline Rogers:

- The Unwanted Guest (Moving Tales Inc, on iPhone and iPod Touch)
