= List of fiction set in Oregon =

The following is a list of fiction, including novels, poetry, film and television, which are set in the U.S. state of Oregon.

== Literature ==
=== Novels ===
- Acute Reactions by Ruby Lang
- The Ancient One by T. A. Barron
- Angel's Devil by M. Louis
- Baker City 1948 by George Byron Wright
- The Barn by Avi
- Beezus and Ramona by Beverly Cleary
- Bleeding Heart by Mary Freeman
- Blue Like Jazz by Don Miller
- The Bridge of the Gods: A Romance of Indian Oregon by Frederick Homer Balch
- Children of the River by Linda Crew
- Clean Breaks by Ruby Lang
- Clear and Convincing Proof (Barbara Holloway, Bk 7) by Kate Wilhelm
- Cold Case (Barbara Holloway, Bk 11) by Kate Wilhelm
- The Cove by Catherine Coulter
- Crown Fire by Eloise Jarvis McGraw
- The Crying Tree by Naseem Rakha
- Curiosity Didn't Kill the Cat (Conan Flagg, Bk 1) by M. K. Wren
- Dataman by Tom Mitcheltree
- Days To Remember by Donna Grundman
- Dead By Sunset by Ann Rule
- Dead Matter (Conan Flagg, Bk 7) by M. K. Wren
- Dead Whales Tell No Tales by Ron Lovell
- Deadly Nightshade by Mary Freeman
- A Death at the Rose (Libby Seale, Bk 2) by M. J. Zellnik
- Death of an Artist by Kate Wilhelm
- Death Qualified (Barbara Holloway, Bk 1) by Kate Wilhelm
- Defense for the Devil (Barbara Holloway, Bk 4) by Kate Wilhelm
- Descent into Madness by Ron Lovell
- Desperate Measures (Barbara Holloway, Bk 6) by Kate Wilhelm
- Devil's Trumpet by Mary Freeman
- Dies the Fire by S. M. Stirling
- Doctor in Buckskin by T. D. Allen
- Doomsday Plus Twelve by James D. Forman
- Down River by Richard Anderson
- Driving to Vernonia by George Byron Wright
- The Drylands by Mary Rosenblum
- Each Bright River by Mildred Masterson McNeilly
- Eating Heaven by Jennie Shortridge
- The Edge by Catherine Coulter
- Ellen Tebbits by Beverly Cleary
- The Emberverse series by S. M. Stirling
- Empty Horizon: A Story of Adventure & Romance in the Northwest by William J. Forest
- Evening's Empire by David Herter
- Everville by Clive Barker
- Every Fixed Star by Jane Kirkpatrick
- Evil at Heart (Archie and Gretchen, Bk 3) by Chelsea Cain
- Failure To Appear by J.A. Jance
- Fifty Shades of Grey by E. L. James
- Fugitives and Refugees: A Walk in Portland, Oregon
- Garden View by Mary Freeman
- A Gathering of Finches by Jane Kirkpatrick
- Geek Love by Katherine Dunn
- Genesis of Shannara by Terry Brooks
- Gideon's Gift by Karen Kingsbury
- A Gift Upon the Shore by M. K. Wren
- Girl by Blake Nelson
- The Girl Who Fell From the Sky by Heidi W. Durrow
- Going to Bend: A Novel by Diane Hammond
- The Golden Telescope: Book One in the Jack and the Magic Hat Maker series by Tracy Partridge-Johnson
- Gone, But Not Forgotten by Phillip Margolin
- The Good Sheriff by Mike Walters
- Hard Knocks by Ruby Lang
- The Hawkline Monster: A Gothic Western by Richard Brautigan
- Heart of the Beast by Joyce Weatherford
- The Hearts of Horses by Molly Gloss
- Heartsick (Archie and Gretchen, Bk 1) by Chelsea Cain
- Heaven Is High (Barbara Holloway, Bk 12) by Kate Wilhelm
- Henry and Beezus by Beverly Cleary
- Henry and the Clubhouse by Beverly Cleary
- Henry and the Paper Route by Beverly Cleary
- Henry and Ribsy by Beverly Cleary
- Henry Huggins by Beverly Cleary
- Hidden Beneath the Pines by Mike Walters
- Hold Tight the Thread by Jane Kirkpatrick
- Homesick Creek: A Novel by Diane Hammond
- Honey in the Horn by H. L. Davis
- Hot Springs by Shirley Parenteau
- In the Wake of Our Misdeed by George Byron Wright
- Jokerman 8 by Richard Melo
- The Jump-Off Creek by Molly Gloss
- Katie's Gold (Paul Fischer, Bk 2) by Tom Mitcheltree
- Katie's Will (Paul Fischer, Bk 1) by Tom Mitcheltree
- King of the Mountain (Conan Flagg, Bk 8) by M. K. Wren
- The Last Dog on Earth by Daniel Ehrenhaft
- Last Go Round by Ken Kesey and Ken Babbs
- The Lathe of Heaven by Ursula K. Le Guin
- Lean On Pete by Willy Vlautin
- Legasea by Krystalyn Drown
- Lights, Camera, Murder! by Ron Lovell
- Love To Water My Soul by Jane Kirkpatrick
- Malice Prepense (Barbara Holloway, Bk 3) by Kate Wilhelm
- A Meeting at Corvallis by S. M. Stirling
- Melody Jackson and the House on Lafayette Street by B.M.B. Johnson
- A Mending at the Edge by Jane Kirkpatrick
- The Mirror Pond Murders by Ted Haynes
- Missing, Maybe Dead (Paul Fischer, Bk 3) by Tom Mitcheltree
- A Multitude of Sins (Conan Flagg, Bk 2) by M. K. Wren
- Murder at the Portland Variety (Libby Seale, Bk 1) by M. J. Zellnik
- Murder at Yaquina Head by Ron Lovell
- Murder in E-Flat Major by Ron Lovell
- Murder Once Done by Mary Lou Bennett
- A Name of Her Own by Jane Kirkpatrick
- A New Life by Bernard Malamud
- Newport Blues by George Byron Wright
- Nightlife by Thomas Perry
- No Defense (Barbara Holloway, Bk 5) by Kate Wilhelm
- Nothing's Certain But Death (Conan Flagg, Bk 4) by M. K. Wren
- Oh, Bury Me Not (Conan Flagg, Bk 3) by M. K. Wren
- On the Road from Burns by Ted Haynes
- One Flew Over the Cuckoo's Nest by Ken Kesey
- Oregon! by Dana Fuller Ross
- Oregon Bride by F. Rosanne Bittner
- Otis Spofford by Beverly Cleary
- Our Lady of the Forest by David Guterson
- The Outlaw River Wilde by Mike Walters
- Paranoid Park by Blake Nelson
- Piecing Me Together by Renée Watson
- Pink by Gus Van Sant
- Point Hope by Kristen James
- The Postman by David Brin
- The Protector's War by S.M. Stirling
- The Quick and the Thread by Amanda Lee
- Ramona novel series by Beverly Cleary
- Ribsy by Beverly Cleary
- Ricochet River by Robin Cody
- River Marked by Patricia Briggs
- River of Love by Lisa McConnell
- River Song by Craig Lesley
- The River Why by David James Duncan
- The Rogue River Incident, Case XI Book I by Mike Walters
- The Rogue River Incident, Case XI Book II by Mike Walters
- Roseburg 1959 by George Byron Wright
- Safely Home by Randy Alcorn
- Searching for Murder by Ron Lovell
- Searoad by Ursula K. Le Guin
- Seasons of Death (Conan Flagg, Bk 5) by M. K. Wren
- The Shack by William P. Young
- Siskiyou by Richard Hoyt
- The Sisters Brothers by Patrick deWitt
- Skeletons by Kate Wilhelm
- Sky Fisherman by Craig Lesley
- Sleight Of Hand (Barbara Holloway, Bk 9) by Kate Wilhelm
- So the Wind Won't Blow It All Away by Richard Brautigan
- Sometimes a Great Notion by Ken Kesey
- A Song Below Water by Bethany C. Morrow
- The Spells of Lamazee: An Historical Novel of the Pacific Northwest Coast by James Seeley White
- The Steep and Thorny Way by Cat Winters
- Still Wilde in Outlaw River by Mike Walters
- Storm Riders by Craig Lesley
- Suspects by Ted Haynes
- Sweetheart (Archie and Gretchen, Bk 2) by Chelsea Cain
- A Sweetness to the Soul by Jane Kirkpatrick
- A Tendering in the Storm by Jane Kirkpatrick
- This Side of Home by Renée Watson
- Tillamook 1952by George Byron Wright
- A Toke to Success: A Fantasy by Mohammod Ti Riff
- The Torn Skirt by Rebecca Godfrey
- Trask by Don Berry
- Tucket's Home by Gary Paulsen
- The Unbidden Truth (Barbara Holloway, Bk 8) by Kate Wilhelm
- Under Wildwood by Colin Meloy
- Vertical by Rex Pickett
- Violence of Action by Richard Marcinko
- Wake Up, Darlin' Corey (Conan Flagg, Bk 6) by M. K. Wren
- The Way West by A. B. Guthrie, Jr.
- Wild Life by Molly Gloss
- Wildwood by Colin Meloy
- Winter kill by Craig Lesley
- The Wrecker by Clive Cussler
- A Wrongful Death (Barbara Holloway, Bk 10) by Kate Wilhelm
- Yaquina White by Ron Lovell
- Yellow Tape and Coffee by Pat Luther

=== Graphic novels ===
- Dead Air by Michael Allred
- iZombie by Chris Roberson and Michael Allred
- Stumptown by Greg Rucka and Matthew Southworth
- Misfit City by Kirsten Smith, Kurt Lustgarten and Naomi Franquiz

== Musical ==
- Shanghaied in Astoria by the Astor Street Opry Company

== Television ==
- The Angry Beavers
- Bates Motel, set in Oregon, but filmed in British Columbia
- Best Friends Whenever
- Crash & Bernstein
- Eureka, set in Oregon, but filmed in British Columbia
- Free Agents, set in Portland, but filmed in Los Angeles
- Gravity Falls, set in the Detroit Lake area of Oregon
- Grimm, set and filmed in Portland
- Hello Larry, set in Portland
- Leverage, set in Portland beginning with season 5; filmed in Oregon since season 2
- Life Unexpected, set in Portland, but filmed in Vancouver
- Lost, episode "Not in Portland"
- Marvin Marvin
- Monday Mornings, set in Portland but will be filmed in Los Angeles
- Nowhere Man, filmed in Portland
- The O.C., season 2 premiere partly set in Portland
- Portlandia
- The Simpsons, possibly loosely set in Oregon; many character names are taken from street names in Portland (Flanders, Rev. Lovejoy)
- So Help Me Todd
- Stumptown
- Sydney to the Max
- The Librarians (TV/Movie Series)
- Under Suspicion
- The X-Files, pilot episode set in Bellefleur, but filmed in British Columbia
- Everything Sucks!, takes place in Boring.

== Video games ==
- Fallout 2
- Gone Home
- Life Is Strange
- Life is Strange: Before the Storm
- The Oregon Trail
- Days Gone
- Lighthouse: The Dark Being

== See also ==
- Music of Oregon
- List of artists and art institutions in Portland, Oregon
- Lists of Oregon-related topics
