= WILLA Literary Award =

Women's literature award

WILLA Literary Award honors outstanding literature featuring women's stories, set in the Western United States, published each year. Women Writing the West (WWW), a non-profit association of writers and other professionals writing and promoting the Women's West, underwrites and presents the nationally recognized award annually.

The award is named in honor of Pulitzer Prize winner Willa Cather, one of the country's foremost novelists. The awards are presented at the WWW Fall Conference.

== Recipients ==
WILLA Literary Award Recipients
| Year | Category | Book | Author | Contributor(s) |
|---|---|---|---|---|
| 1999 | Contemporary Fiction | Waltzing the Cat | Pam Houston | |
| 1999 | Historical Fiction | Daughter of Joy | JoAnn Levy | |
| 1999 | Memoir/Essay | Writing Down the River | Kathleen Jo Ryan | |
| 1999 | Nonfiction | Becoming Laura Ingalls Wilder | John Miller | |
| 1999 | Young Adult Fiction | Riding Freedom | Pam Muñoz Ryan | |
| 1999 | Children’s Fiction | Prairie Dog Pioneers | Jo Harper | |
| 1999 | Original Paperback | River of Our Return | Gladys Smith | |
| 2000 | Contemporary Fiction | Close Range | Annie Proulx | |
| 2000 | Historical Fiction | Daughter of Fortune | Isabel Allende | |
| 2000 | Memoir/Essay | Begosa Cabin | Mari Graña | |
| 2000 | Nonfiction | Molly Brown: Unraveling the Myth | Kristen Iversen | |
| 2000 | Young Adult Fiction | The Birchbark House | Louise Erdrich | |
| 2000 | Children’s Fiction | Red Flower Goes West | Ann Turner | |
| 2000 | Children’s Nonfiction | Children of the Gold Rush | Claire Murphy and Jane Haigh | |
| 2000 | Original Paperback | Prophet Annie | Ellen Recknor | |
| 2001 | Contemporary Fiction | The Spirit Woman | Margaret Coel | |
| 2001 | Historical Fiction | For California’s Gold | JoAnn Levy | |
| 2001 | Original Paperback | Dead Man Falls | Paula Boyd | |
| 2001 | Memoir/Essay | One Degree West: Reflections of a Plainsdaughter | Julene Bair | |
| 2001 | Children’s/Young Adult Fiction | Esperanza Rising | Pam Muñoz Ryan | |
| 2001 | Poetry | Swan, What Shores? | Veronica Patterson | |
| 2002 | Contemporary Fiction | This House of Women | Paul Scott Malone | |
| 2002 | Historical Fiction | The Good Journey | Micaela Gilchrist | |
| 2002 | Nonfiction | Eye of the Blackbird | Holly Skinner | |
| 2002 | Memoir/Essay | She Flies Without Wings | Mary D. Midkiff | |
| 2002 | Original Paperback | Across the Sweet Grass Hills | Gail Jenner | |
| 2002 | Poetry | Blood Sister, I Am to These Fields | Linda Hussa | |
| 2002 | Children’s/Young Adult | Cissy Funk | Kim Taylor Blakemore | |
| 2003 | Contemporary Fiction | Perma Red | Debra Magpie Earling | |
| 2003 | Historical Fiction | Enemy Women | Paulette Jiles | |
| 2003 | Memoir/Essay | Breaking Clean | Judy Blunt | |
| 2003 | Nonfiction | Mary Colter: Architect of the Southwest | Arnold Berke | |
| 2003 | Original Paperback | Small Rocks Rising | Susan Lang | |
| 2003 | Poetry | Miracles of Sainted Earth | Victoria Edwards Tester | |
| 2003 | Children’s/Young Adult | Circle of Time | Marisa Montes | |
| 2004 | Contemporary Fiction | All Over Creation | Ruth Ozeki | |
| 2004 | Historical Fiction | Silver Lies | Ann Parker | |
| 2004 | Memoir/Essay | Predators, Prey and Other Kinfolk | Dorothy Allred Solomon | |
| 2004 | Nonfiction | Bold Spirit: Helga Estby’s Forgotten Walk Across Victorian America | Linda Lawrence Hunt | |
| 2004 | Original Softcover | Deliverance Valley | Gladys Smith | |
| 2004 | Poetry | Original Fire | Louise Erdrich | |
| 2004 | Children’s/Young Adult | Rodzina | Karen Cushman | |
| 2005 | Memoir/Essay | Into the Canyon: Seven Years in Navajo Country | Lucy Moore | |
| 2005 | Nonfiction | Isabella Greenway: An Enterprising Woman | Kristie Miller | |
| 2005 | Contemporary Fiction | The Real Minerva: A Novel | Mary Sharrat | |
| 2005 | Historical Fiction | Tombstone Travesty: Allie Earp Remembers | Jane Candia Coleman | |
| 2005 | Children’s/Young Adult Fiction & Nonfiction | Nothing Here but Stones | Nancy Oswald | |
| 2005 | Original Softcover Fiction | Echoes | Erin Grady | |
| 2005 | Poetry | I Am Madagascar | Ellen Waterston | |
| 2006 | Contemporary Fiction | Sky Bridge | Laura Pritchett | |
| 2006 | Historical Fiction | New Mercies | Sandra Dallas | |
| 2006 | Original Softcover Fiction (Trade or Mass Market) | Summer of Fire | Linda Jacobs | |
| 2006 | Children’s/Young Adult Fiction & Nonfiction | A Heart for Any Fate: Westward to Oregon, 1845 | Linda Crew | |
| 2006 | Memoir/Essay | The Lady Rode Bucking Horses | Dee Marvine | |
| 2006 | Other Nonfiction | Impertinences: Selected Writings of Elia Peattie | Susanne Bloomfield | |
| 2006 | Poetry | Beasts in Snow | Jane Elkington Wohl | |
| 2007 | Contemporary Fiction | The Girl from Charnelle | K. L. Cook | |
| 2007 | Creative Nonfiction | Montana Women Writers: Geography of the Heart | Caroline Patterson, Editor with introduction, Sue Hart | |
| 2007 | Scholarly Nonfiction | Revolutionary Heart: The Life of Clarina Nichols and the Pioneering Crusade for Women’s Rights | Diane Eickhoff | |
| 2007 | Historical Fiction | The Night Journal | Elizabeth Crook | |
| 2007 | Poetry | To Sing Along the Way: Minnesota Women Poets from Pre-Territorial Days to the Present | Connie Wanek, Joyce Sutphen, Thom Tammaro, Editors | |
| 2007 | Original Softcover Fiction (Trade or Mass Market) | Hallowed Ground | Lori G. Armstrong | |
| 2007 | Children’s/Young Adult Fiction & Nonfiction | Harvey Girl | Sheila Wood Foard | |
| 2008 | Contemporary Fiction | What the Thunder Said | Janet Peery | |
| 2008 | Creative Nonfiction | What Wildness Is This: Women Write About the Southwest | Susan Wittig Albert, Susan Hanson, Jan Epton Seale, Paula Stallings Yost, Editors | |
| 2008 | Scholarly Nonfiction | Laura Ingalls Wilder: A Writer’s Life | Pamela Smith Hill | |
| 2008 | Historical Fiction | Harp Song | Rilla Askew | |
| 2008 | Poetry | Raven Eye | Margo Tamez | |
| 2008 | Original Softcover Fiction (Trade or Mass Market) | A Tendering in the Storm | Jane Kirkpatrick | |
| 2008 | Children’s/Young Adult Fiction & Nonfiction | Exiled: From Tragedy to Triumph on the Missouri Frontier | Louise A Jackson | |
| 2009 | Contemporary Fiction | The Last Cowgirl | Jana Richman | |
| 2009 | Creative Nonfiction | Salt in Our Blood: The Memoir of a Fisherman’s Wife | Michele Longo Eder | |
| 2009 | Scholarly Nonfiction | Full Court Quest: The Girls from Fort Shaw Indian School, Basketball Champions of the World | Linda Peavy and Ursula Smith | |
| 2009 | Historical Fiction | Charley’s Choice: The Life and Times Of Charley Parkhurst | Fern J. Hill | |
| 2009 | Poetry | Between Desert Seasons | Ellen Waterston | |
| 2009 | Original Softcover Fiction (Trade or Mass Market) | Buffalo Bill’s Defunct: A Latouche County Mystery | Sheila Simonson | |
| 2009 | Children’s/Young Adult Fiction & Nonfiction | Dreams on the Oregon Trail | Barbara Linsley | |
| 2010 | Contemporary Fiction | Wild Sorrow | Sandi Ault | |
| 2010 | Creative Nonfiction | No Place Like Home: Notes from a Western Life | Linda Hasselstrom | |
| 2010 | Scholarly Nonfiction | Dorothea Lange: A Life Beyond Limits | Linda Gordon | |
| 2010 | Historical Fiction | My Name Is Falon: One Woman’s Saga from Scotland to the Texas Frontier | Kim Wiese | |
| 2010 | Poetry | Work Is Love Made Visible | Jeanetta Calhoun Mish | |
| 2010 | Original Softcover Fiction (Trade or Mass Market) | A Flickering Light | Jane Kirkpatrick | |
| 2010 | Children’s/Young Adult Fiction & Nonfiction | Hellie Jondoe | Randall Platt | |
| 2011 | Contemporary Fiction | Unbroken | Jamie Lisa Forbes | |
| 2011 | Historical Fiction | Take Me Home | Brian Leung | |
| 2011 | Original Softcover Fiction | Light on a Distant Hill | B. J. Scott | |
| 2011 | Creative Nonfiction | To the Woods: Sinking Roots, Living Lightly, and Finding True Home | Evelyn Searle Hess | |
| 2011 | Scholarly Nonfiction | A Force for Change: Beatrice Morrow Cannady and the Struggle for Civil Rights in Oregon, 1912–1936 | Kimberley Mangun | |
| 2011 | Poetry | Blood Desert: Witnesses, 1820–1880 | Renny Golden | |
| 2011 | Children’s/Young Adult Fiction & Nonfiction | Follow the Dream | Heidi M. Thomas | |
| 2012 | Contemporary Fiction | Raising Wrecker | Summer Wood | |
| 2012 | Historical Fiction | The Bride’s House | Sandra Dallas | |
| 2012 | Original Softcover Fiction | The American Café | Sara Sue Hoklotubbe | |
| 2012 | Creative Nonfiction | Rightful Place | Amy Hale Auker | |
| 2012 | Scholarly Nonfiction | Recollecting: Lives of Aboriginal Women of the Canadian Northwest and Borderlands | Sarah Carter and Patricia McCormack, Editors | |
| 2012 | Poetry | Married into It | Patricia Frolander | |
| 2012 | Children’s/Young Adult Fiction & Nonfiction | The Year We Were Famous | Carole Estby Dagg | |
| 2013 | Contemporary Fiction | Theft | BK Loren | |
| 2013 | Historical Fiction | True Sisters | Sandra Dallas | |
| 2013 | Original Softcover Fiction | The Bones and the Book | Jane Isenberg | |
| 2013 | Creative Nonfiction | Kissed by a Fox: And Other Stories of Friendship in Nature | Priscilla Stuckey | |
| 2013 | Scholarly Nonfiction | Women in Wonderland: Lives, Legends, and Legacies of Yellowstone National Park | Elizabeth A. Watry | |
| 2013 | Poetry | Steam Laundry | Nicole Stellon O’Donnell | |
| 2013 | Children’s/Young Adult Fiction & Nonfiction | Liberty’s Christmas | Randall Platt | |
| 2014 | Contemporary Fiction | Bone Horses | Leslie Poling-Kempes | |
| 2014 | Historical Fiction | Dollybird | Anne Lazurko | |
| 2014 | Original Softcover Fiction | Junction, Utah | Rebecca Lawton | |
| 2014 | Creative Nonfiction | Gaining Daylight: Life on Two Islands | Sara Loewen | |
| 2014 | Scholarly Nonfiction | Trail Sisters: Freedwomen in Indian Territory, 1850–1890 | Linda Williams Reese | |
| 2014 | Poetry | Losing the Ring in the River | Marge Saiser | |
| 2014 | Children’s/Young Adult Fiction & Nonfiction | Written in Stone | Rosanne Parry | |
| 2015 | Contemporary Fiction | Point of Direction | Rachel Weaver | |
| 2015 | Historical Fiction | A Quilt for Christmas | Sandra Dallas | |
| 2015 | Original Softcover Fiction | A Light in the Wilderness | Jane Kirkpatrick | |
| 2015 | Creative Nonfiction | Diary of a Citizen Scientist | Sharman Apt Russell | |
| 2015 | Scholarly Nonfiction | Quite Contrary: The Litigious Life of Mary Bennett Love | David J. Langum Sr. | |
| 2015 | Poetry | The Secret Life of Us Kids | Bonnie B. Maldonado | |
| 2015 | Children’s/Young Adult Fiction & Nonfiction | Searching for Silver Heels | Jeannie Mobley | |
| 2016 | Contemporary Fiction | Firebreak | Tricia Fields | |
| 2016 | Scholarly Nonfiction | Ladies of the Canyons: A League of Extraordinary Women and Their Adventures in the American Southwest | Lesley Poling-Kempes | |
| 2016 | Historical Fiction | The Bookseller | Cynthia Swanson | |
| 2016 | Poetry | Report to the Department of the Interior: Poems | Diane Glancy | |
| 2016 | Original Softcover Fiction | Hidden Shadows | Linda Lucretia Schuler | |
| 2016 | Children's / Young Adult Fiction & Nonfiction | Shadow of the Hawk | K. S. Jones | |
| 2016 | Creative Nonfiction | American Ghost: A Family's Haunted Past in the Desert Southwest | Hannah Nordhaus | |
| 2017 | Contemporary Fiction | Piano Tide | Kathleen Dean Moore | |
| 2017 | Scholarly Nonfiction | Soap Suds Row: The Bold Lives of Army Laundresses 1802-1876 | Jennifer J. Lawrence | |
| 2017 | Historical Fiction | Basque Moon | Julie Whitesel Weston | |
| 2017 | Poetry | Demimonde | Kierstin Bridger | |
| 2017 | Original Softcover Fiction | Beloved Over All: Historical Fiction | Irene Sandell | |
| 2017 | Children's / Young Adult Fiction & Nonfiction | Soldier Sister, Fly Home | Nancy Bo Flood | |
| 2017 | Creative Nonfiction | Fast into the Night: A Woman, Her Dogs, and Their Journey North on the Iditarod Trail | Debbie Clarke Moderow | |
| 2018 | Contemporary Fiction | Zetty | Debra Whiting Alexander | |
| 2018 | Scholarly Nonfiction | Peace Weavers: Uniting the Salish Coast Through Cross-Cultural Marriages | Candace Wellman | |
| 2018 | Historical Fiction | Stranded: A Story of Frontier Survival | Matthew P. Mayo | |
| 2018 | Poetry | Rock Tree Bird | Twyla M. Hansen | |
| 2018 | Original Softcover Fiction | Hidden Ones: A Veil of Memories | Marcia Fine | |
| 2018 | Children's / Young Adult Fiction & Nonfiction | The Tragically True Adventures of Kit Donovan | Patricia Bailey | |
| 2018 | Creative Nonfiction | Women Artists of the Great Basin | Mary Lee Fulkerson | Susan E Mantle |
| 2019 | Contemporary Fiction | The Flicker of Old Dreams | Susan Henderson | |
| 2019 | Scholarly Nonfiction | Beyond the Rebel Girl: Women and the Industrial Workers of the World in the Pacific Northwest, 1905-1924 | Heather Mayer | |
| 2019 | Historical Fiction | The Which Way Tree | Elizabeth Crook | |
| 2019 | Poetry | Coming Out of Nowhere | Linda Schandelmeier | |
| 2019 | Original Softcover Fiction | See Also Proof | Larry D. Sweazy | |
| 2019 | Children's Fiction & Nonfiction | Hard Scrabble | Sandra Dallas | |
| 2019 | Creative Nonfiction | My Ranch Too | Mary Budd Flitner | |
| 2019 | Young Adult Fiction & Nonfiction | The Communing Tree | Theresa Verboort | |
| 2020 | Contemporary Fiction | The Lager Queen of Minnesota | J. Ryan Stradal | |
| 2020 | Historical Fiction | The Glovemaker: A Novel | Ann Weisgarber | |
| 2020 | Original Softcover Fiction | The Red Dirt Hymnbook | Roxie Faulkner Kirk | |
| 2020 | Creative Nonfiction | I Am a Stranger Here Myself | Debra Gwartney | |
| 2020 | Scholarly Nonfiction | Arequipa Sanatorium: Life in California’s Lung Resort for Women | Lynn Downey | |
| 2020 | Poetry | We Make a Tiny Herd: Poems to Honor the Burro Lady of Far West Texas | Lucy Griffith | |
| 2020 | Children’s Fiction & Nonfiction | (Tie) Someplace to Call Home | Sandra Dallas | |
| 2020 | Children’s Fiction & Nonfiction | (Tie) The Seagirls of the Irene | KB Taylor | |
| 2020 | Young Adult Fiction & Nonfiction | Professor Renoir’s Collection of Oddities, Curiosities, and Delights | Randall Platt | |
| 2021 | Contemporary Fiction | Hanging Falls: A Timber Creek K-9 Mystery | Margaret Mizushima | |
| 2021 | Historical Fiction | Wild Rivers, Wild Rose | Sarah Birdsall | |
| 2021 | Original Softcover Fiction | 142 Ostriches | April Dávila | |
| 2021 | Creative Nonfiction | Miracle Country: A Memoir of a Family and a Landscape | Kendra Atleework | |
| 2021 | Scholarly Nonfiction | Ours by Every Law of Right and Justice: Women and the Vote in the Prairie Provinces | Sarah Carter | |
| 2021 | Poetry | Second Wind | Patricia Frolander | |
| 2021 | Children’s Fiction & Nonfiction | The Girl Who Moved to the Town That Wasn’t There | Suzanne Hovik Fuller | |
| 2021 | Young Adult Fiction & Nonfiction | Taylor Before and After | Jennie Englund | |
| 2022 | Multiform Fiction | Striking Range: A Timber Creek K-9 Mystery | Margaret Mizushima | |
| 2022 | Historical Fiction | The Children’s Blizzard | Melanie Benjamin | |
| 2022 | Romance | A Texas Christmas Miracle | Justine Davis | |
| 2022 | Creative Nonfiction | The Forgotten Botanist | Sarah Plummer | |
| 2022 | Scholarly Nonfiction | Sally in Three Worlds: An Indian Captive in the House of Brigham Young | Virginia Kerns | |
| 2022 | Poetry | Sometimes a Woman | Kimberly K. Williams | |
| 2022 | Children’s Fiction & Nonfiction | Headstrong Hallie!: The Story of Hallie Morse Daggett, the First Female “Fire Guard” | Aimée Bissonette | |
| 2022 | Young Adult Fiction & Nonfiction | Runaway Moon | Carole T. Beers | |
| 2023 | Multiform Fiction | Happy for You: A Novel | Claire Stanford | |
| 2023 | Historical Fiction | Woman of Light | Kali Fajardo-Anstine | |
| 2023 | Romance | Henley | Shanna Hatfield | |
| 2023 | Creative Nonfiction | Brave Hearted: The Women of the American West | Katie Hickman | |
| 2023 | Scholarly Nonfiction | The Widowed Ones: Beyond the Battle of the Little Bighorn | Chris Enss and Howard Kazanjian with Chris Kortlander | |
| 2023 | Children’s Fiction & Nonfiction | The Other Side of the River | Alda P. Dobbs | |
| 2023 | Young Adult Fiction & Nonfiction | Meg and the Rocks | Katy Hammel | |
| 2023 | Poetry | Prairie Midden | Athena Kildegaard | |
