= Margaret Coel =

American historian and mystery writer

- Born: October 11, 1937 (age 88); Denver, Colorado, U.S.
- Education: Marquette University
- Occupations: Historian; writer
- Writing career
- Notable awards: Colorado Book Award (x6); WILLA Literary Award

Signature
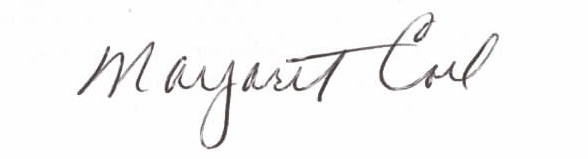

Margaret Coel (born October 11, 1937, in Denver, Colorado) is an American historian and mystery writer who lives in Boulder, Colorado. Coel is a fourth-generation Coloradan and grew up in Denver. She graduated in journalism from Marquette University in 1960 and worked on the Boulder Daily Camera. Coel has received six Colorado Book Awards and one WILLA Literary Award.

== Wind River Mysteries ==
This series—20 books published from 1995 to 2016—is set in Wyoming's Wind River Reservation and adjacent towns. The story lines are based on actual crimes and injustices. Vicky Holden, an Arapaho lawyer, and Father John O'Malley, a Jesuit priest, collaborate to solve the crimes and rectify the injustices.

== Works ==
- Chief Left Hand. University of Oklahoma Press, Norman, Oklahoma, 1988. ISBN 978-0-8061-2030-0.
- Goin' Railroading: Two Generations of Colorado Stories as told by Sam Speas. University of Oklahoma Press, Norman, Oklahoma, 1985. ISBN 0-87081-497-4/978-0-87081-497-6.
- The Eagle Catcher. A Vicky Holden, Father John O'Malley book. 1995
- The Ghost Walker. A Vicky Holden, Father John O’Malley book. 1996
- The Dream Stalker. A Vicky Holden, Father John O'Malley book. 1997
- The Story Teller. A Vicky Holden, Father John O’Malley book. 1998
- The Lost Bird. A Vicky Holden, Father John O’Malley book. 1999
- The Spirit Woman. A Vicky Holden, Father John O’Malley book. 2000
- The Thunder Keeper. A Vicky Holden, Father John O’Malley book. 2001
- The Shadow Dancer. A Vicky Holden, Father John O’Malley book. 2002
- Killing Raven. A Vicky Holden, Father John O'Malley book. 2003
- Wife of Moon. A Vicky Holden, Father John O'Malley book. 2004
- Eye of Wolf. A Vicky Holden, Father John O'Malley book. 2005
- The Drowning Man. A Vicky Holden, Father John O’Malley book. 2006
- The Girl with Braided Hair. A Vicky Holden, Father John O'Malley book. 2007
- Blood Memory. A Catherine McLeod book. 2008
- The Silent Spirit. A Vicky Holden, Father John O'Malley book. 2009
- The Spider's Web. A Vicky Holden, Father John O'Malley book. 2010
- The Perfect Suspect. A Catherine McLeod book. 2011
- Buffalo Bill's Dead Now. A Vicky Holden, Father John O’Malley book. 2012
- Killing Custer. A Vicky Holden, Father John O'Malley book. 2013
- Night of the White Buffalo. A Vicky Holden, Father John O'Malley book. 2014
- The Man Who Fell from the Sky. A Vicky Holden, Father John O'Malley book. 2015
- Winter's Child. A Vicky Holden, Father John O'Malley book. 2016, final book in the Wind River Reservation series.
