= Henry Huggins =

Fictional character

- Cover of Henry Huggins
- First appearance: Henry Huggins (1950)
- Last appearance: Ramona and Her Father (1977)
- Created by: Beverly Cleary
- Portrayed by: Hutch Dano (Ramona and Beezus)

In-universe information
- Gender: Male

Henry Huggins is a character appearing in a series of children's literature novels by Beverly Cleary, illustrated by Louis Darling, and first appearing in Henry Huggins. He is a young boy living on Klickitat Street in Portland, Oregon. In the novels, he is in elementary school. The novels take place in the 1950s, which is when Cleary wrote most of the books. The books describe adventures that he experiences in his neighborhood and his interactions with other neighborhood children. He has a dog named Ribsy and a part-time job doing a paper route in North Portland.

Cleary, a librarian, wrote the first Henry Huggins book in 1950, in response to the boys in her library searching for books "about boys like us." Cleary later launched a new series about one of the supporting characters, Ramona Quimby. The Ramona series ultimately surpassed the Henry Huggins series in popularity. Henry appeared only rarely in the Ramona series, as a supporting character. He was portrayed by Hutch Dano in the movie Ramona and Beezus.

== Books in the Henry Huggins series ==
- Henry Huggins, published in 1950
- Henry and Beezus, published in 1952
- Henry and Ribsy, published in 1954
- Henry and the Paper Route, published in 1957
- Henry and the Clubhouse, published in 1962
- Ribsy, published in 1964

== Characters in Henry Huggins series ==
- Henry Huggins: Henry is a red-headed 11 year old, but starts out as an 8 year old.
- Ribsy: Ribsy is Henry's dog; the dog was named "Ribsy" because when Henry found him, he was so thin, his ribs were showing.
- Nosy: Nosy is Henry's cat. The cat was named "Nosy" because he was pecking his wet nose at Henry's dad when there were four kittens.
- Beezus Quimby: Beezus, whose real name is Beatrice, is one of the children in Henry's neighborhood. In Henry's opinion, she's "pretty sensible for a girl". Beezus acquired her nickname because her younger sister, Ramona, was unable to say "Beatrice" when she was learning to talk. Everyone in the neighborhood, including Beezus and her family, adopted Ramona's pronunciation.
- Ramona Quimby: Ramona is Beezus's younger sister. She wants to do everything her sister and Henry do, but because she is so young, the older children perceive her as a pest. In her preschool days, her favorite TV show was the Sheriff Bud show, a fictionalization of Howdy Doody.
- Robert: Henry's best friend. Surname is unknown.
- Scooter McCarthy: An older boy with a paper route; Henry is often irritated by Scooter's upperclassman attitudes.
- Byron "Murph" Murphy: An older boy who is a genius, and friends with Henry. Murph moves to Henry's neighborhood in Henry and the Paper Route.
- Mary Jane: A girl who lives down the street who is friends with Beezus. Surname is unknown. Henry does not really like her because she is too prissy.
- The Grumbies: The Hugginses' neighbors. Henry gets along with Mr. Grumbie but dislikes Mrs. Grumbie because she does not like Ribsy, which is "the same thing as not liking Henry".
