= Laura Pritchett =

American writer (born 1971)

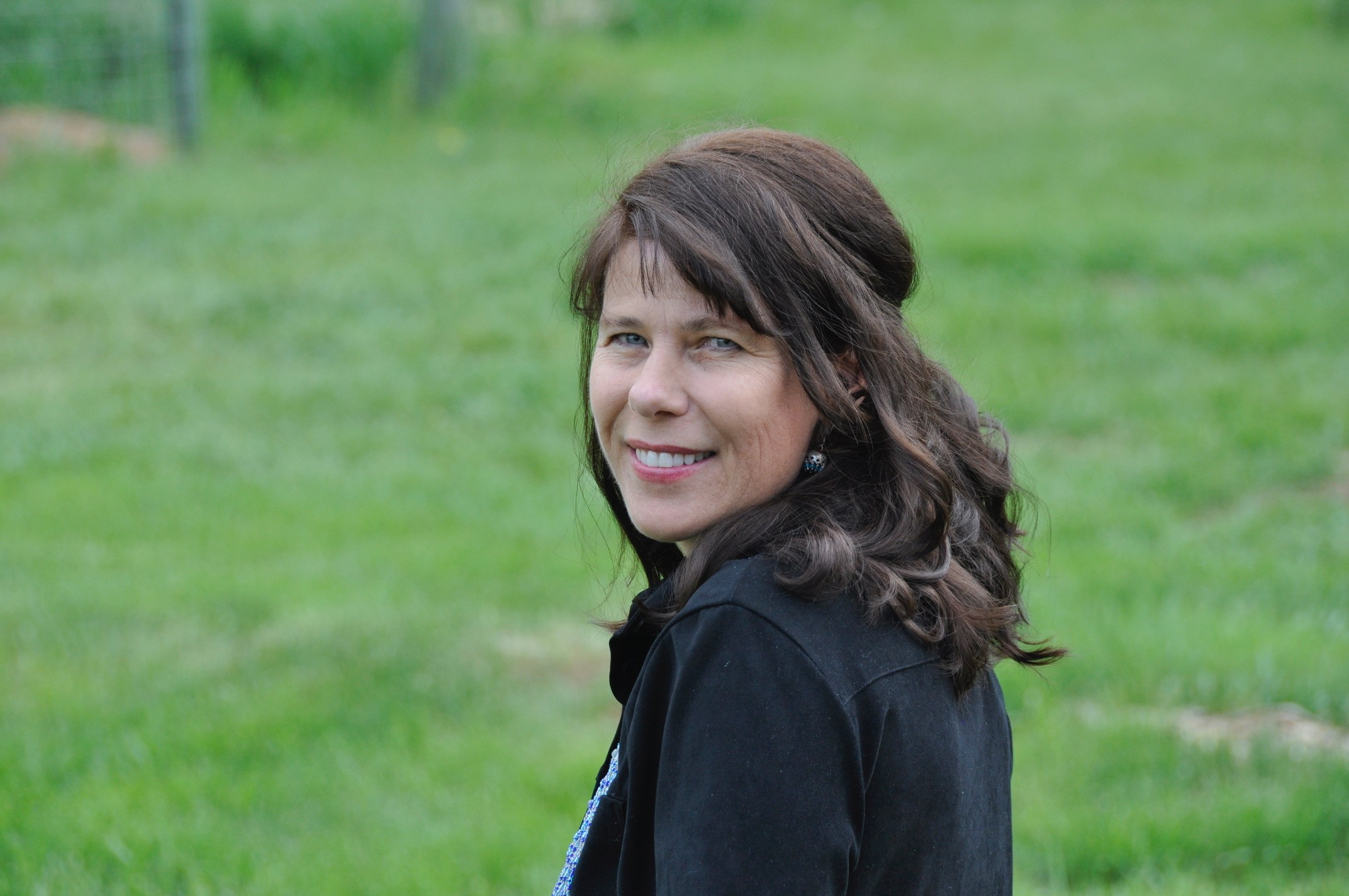
- Born: 1971, Fort Collins, Colorado
- Occupation: Author
- Education: B.A., M.A. Colorado State University, PhD Purdue University
- Genre: Literary Fiction
- Website: www.laurapritchett.com

Laura Pritchett is an American author whose work is rooted in the natural world. Known for championing the complex and contemporary American West and giving voice to the working class, her books have garnered the PEN USA Award, the Milkweed National Fiction Prize, the WILLA, the High Plains Book Award, and others. Both her fiction and nonfiction often focus on issues of ecology, conservation, climate change, and social justice issues.

Primarily a novelist, her seven works of fiction hail from various presses, including Ballantine, Counterpoint, Milkweed Editions, and Torrey House. She cites her childhood on a ranch in northern Colorado as a primary influence on both her writing and environmental ethic.

== Biography ==
Laura Pritchett grew up on a small ranch in northern Colorado. She received her BA and MA in English at Colorado State University in 1995. She has a PhD in English with an emphasis in Contemporary American Literature and Creative Writing from Purdue University.

In 2024 she released two books: Playing with (Wild)Fire, released by Torrey House Press and Three Keys, released by Ballantine. Her 2014 novel, Stars Go Blue, released by Counterpoint, was heavily inspired by her father's struggle with Alzheimer's disease and the impact of his disease on her extended family. The book had an enthusiastic critical reception, including starred reviews from Booklist, and Library Journal. It won the High Plains Literary Award and was a finalist for several others. Her other novels include The Blue Hour, Red Lightning, Sky Bridge, and Hell's Bottom, Colorado, which won the PEN USA Award for Fiction and the Milkweed National Fiction Prize.

Pritchett also writes for several magazines, most often about environmental issues in the American West. She was a regular columnist with The Colorado Sun.

She teaches for writing programs around the United States and is the Director of the Nature Writing MFA program at Western Colorado University.

== Awards ==
- Milkweed National Fiction Prize, Hell's Bottom, Colorado, 2001.
- PEN USA West Literary Award for Fiction, Hell's Bottom, Colorado, 2002.
- WILLA Literary Award for Sky Bridge, 2006.
- Colorado Book Award, Home Land: Ranching and a West That Works, 2007. (anthology)
- High Plains Book Awards, Stars Go Blue, 2015.
- Booklist Editor's Choice, The Blue Hour, 2017.
- Colorado Book Award, The Blue Hour, 2018

== Works ==
=== Fiction ===
- Hell's Bottom, Colorado Milkweed Editions. 2001. ISBN 978-1-57131-036-1
- Sky Bridge Milkweed Editions. 2005. ISBN 978-1-57131-054-5
- Stars Go Blue Counterpoint. 2014. ISBN 978-1-61902-308-6
- Red Lightning Counterpoint. 2015. ISBN 978-1-61902-533-2
- The Blue Hour Counterpoint. 2017. ISBN 978-1-61902-889-0
- Playing with Wild(fire) Torrey House Press. 2024. ISBN 1948814900
- Three Keys Ballantine Books. 2024. ISBN 9780593724200

=== Nonfiction ===
==== Books ====
- Great Colorado Bear Stories Riverbend Publishing. 2012. ISBN 978-1-60639-051-1
- Making Friends with Death: A Field Guide for Your Impending Last Breath (to be read, ideally, before it's imminent!) Simon and Schuster. 2017. ISBN 9781632280602

==== As Editor/Contributor ====
- Pulse of the River: Colorado Writers Speak for the Endangered Cache la Poudre Co-editor, contributor. Big Earth Publishing. 2007. ISBN 978-1-55566-392-6
- Home Land: Ranching and a West that Works Co-editor, contributor. Johnson Books. 2007. ISBN 978-1-55566-400-8
- Going Green: True Tales from Gleaners, Scavengers, and Dumpster Divers Editor, contributor. University of Oklahoma Press. 2009. ISBN 978-0-80614-013-1

=== Short stories ===
- "Dry Roots," The Sun, June 1999.
- "Last Bid," The Sun, March 2000.
- "Under the Apple Tree," The Sun, August 2006.
- "Painting the Constellations," The Normal School, Issue 1, 2008. Nominated for a Pushcart Prize
- "The Color of the Impression," The Rocky Mountain News, November 2008. Adapted for Stories on Stage in "A Colorado Collection".
- "The Sky Behind the Trees," The Pinch, Spring 2010.
- "Plan B," High Desert Journal, Fall 2010.
- "I Am the Devil," The Normal School, Spring 2011.
- "Imaginary Me," Split Infinitive, September 2013.
- "One, Two, Three," The Normal School, Spring 2019.
- "Spring Thunderstorm," Tiny Seed Literary Journal, December 2020.
- "Calling Mother Earth," Camas, Winter 2021.
- "Bluestem," Santa Fe Literary Review, June 2022.
- "Sleeping Bear Speaks to Nova," Terrain, February 2024.
- "Deer in the Poppies," Ecotone, 2024.

=== Essays ===
- "Resurrecting J. Thomas," High Country News, March 2006.
- "Wildfire Stars," High Desert Journal, Issue 10, Fall 2009.
- "The Bird at the Window," The Sun Magazine, Issue 409, January 2010.
- "Little Doses of Danger," High Country News, May 2010.
- "The Western Lit Blues," High Country News, September 2010.
- "Drag," The Sun Magazine, November 2011.
- "Can an Old Mine be a Work of Art?" High Country News, November 2011.
- "I Don't Love My Dog," High Country News, February 2012.
- "Seven Days on Playa's New Planet: Notes From the Edge of the Writing World," Poets & Writers, March/April 2012.
- Pritchett, Laura (July 26, 2012). "When the fires came for us". Salon. Archived from the original on July 26, 2012.
- "Sustainable Living Fair: Bridging the Gap," 5280: The Denver Magazine, September 2012.
- "An Ode to Snow," High Country News, February 2014.
- "Caregiving: I'll do it my way," O Magazine, November 2014.
- "The Last Memory," Tin House, June 2014.
- "A QA with Native American Author Erika Wurth," High Country News, September 2015.
- "My father's death did not have dignity (so I threw a party)," Writers on the Range, 2015.
- "An Ode to Gardens and Dirt," High Country News, November 2015.
- "No sound, no fury, no marriage." New York Times, Modern Love. May 2016.
- "A Writer's Tip for Writing Better Sex Scenes," Publishers Weekly, January 2017.
- "Breathing Again," High Country News, Writers on Range, February 2017.
- "The Middle Ages: Sex Scenes of the Middle Aged in Literature," Bloom, February 2017.
- "The Great West Has More than One Story to Tell," Literary Hub, February 2017.
- "Thoughts on the End of the World," co-written with Ana Maria Spagna, High Country News, November 2017.
- "On Love in Death Valley: And What's Been Lost," High Country News, February 2018.
- "Migrations," Wildness Literary Journal, February 2018.
- "The West on Wheels: Climbing Colorado's Mountains," Cowboys and Indians Magazine, March 2019.
- "Write On, Colorado," The Colorado Sun, March 2020.
- "Wildfires Need a Collective Fix," Writers on the Range, October 2020.
- "Play, Hands," The Sun Magazine, January 2021.
- "Dieback, Beetlekill," Deep Wild, June 2021. Nominated for a Pushcart.
- "Ten Seconds," Terrain, October 2021.
- "GenDread writers try to tell the truth about the way we live now," Writers on the Range, November 2021.
- "Renovations," Creative Nonfiction, Spring 2022. Nominated for a Pushcart.
- "In Defense of Facebook," cowritten with CMarie Fuhrman, Orion Magazine, 2023.
- "Bear v. Man," USA Today, June 2, 2024.
- "The Wild and Urgent Power of Words: Capturing Climate Chaos in Fiction," She Writes, July 2024.
- "Opinion: When it comes to the U.S.-Mexico border, can people think beyond politics?" Los Angeles Times, August 2024.

=== Play ===
- Dirt: A Terra Nova Expedition premiered at Bas Bleu Theatre. 2018.

== In the Media ==
=== Interviews ===
- "How to Beat Writer's Block," Colorado Public Radio, June 2014.
- "Grafting Experiences Like Hides: A Conversation with Laura Pritchett," Fiction Writers Review, June 2014.
- "Laura Pritchett on Sex, Writing Without Limits and Bringing Back Grizzly Bears," Westword, September 2018.
- "Jaipur Literature Festival," Colorado & Company, September 2018.
- "Laura Pritchett's fiction spurred empathy for real wildfire experience," The Colorado Sun, February 2024.
- "Colorado author Laura Pritchett talks about her new novel "Playing with (Wild)fire,"" The Daily Sun-Up, February 2024.
- "During climate chaos, a witness and champion of the West," High Country News, February 2024.
- "Laura Pritchett discusses her new novel Playing with Wild(fire)," KVNF, March 2024.
- "Wildfires and shared traumas of 2020 inspired Colorado Author Laura Pritchett's new novel," Colorado Public Radio, June 10, 2024.
- "The Wild and Urgent Power of Words: Capturing Climate Chaos in Fiction," She Writes, July 2024.
- "Laura Pritchett considered a life of crime — but only in a kind, fictional way," The Colorado Sun, July 14, 2024.
- "Dear Reader Column," Dear Reader, July 16, 2024.
- "Laura Pritchett celebrates her new novel, Three Keys," KVNF, July 16, 2024.

=== Articles ===
- "5 books that will make you think about what it means to be human," PBS News Hour, March 2017.
- "19 Books You HAVE To Read Before You Die," Fupping, 2018.
- "A map of 1,001 novels to show us where to find the real America," Los Angeles Times, May 2023.
- "The best delightful books about Mama Earth," Shepherd, July 2024.
- "Read Your Way Around Denver," New York Times, August 2024.

=== Critical reception ===
Playing with Wild(fire)

- Starred review from Booklist
- Starred Review from Foreward
