= Shortridge =

Shortridge is a surname. Notable people with the name include

- Clara Shortridge Foltz (1849–1934), American lawyer
- Belle Hunt Shortridge (1858–1893), American author
- Eli C. D. Shortridge (1830–1908), American politician, Governor of North Dakota
- Guy C. Shortridge (1880–1949), South African mammalogist and curator
- Jennie Shortridge (born 1959), American novelist and musician
- Pat Shortridge, American lobbyist
- Samuel M. Shortridge (1861–1952), American politician from California
- Stephen Shortridge (born 1951), American actor

== See also ==
- Shortridge Academy, residential secondary school in Milton, New Hampshire, United States
- Shortridge High School, public high school located in Indianapolis, Indiana, United States
- Shortridge–Meridian Street Apartments Historic District, national historic district located at Indianapolis, Indiana, United States
