= Poet Laureate of Wyoming =

- Incumbent; Eugene M. Gagliano since 2016
- Type: Poet Laureate
- Formation: 1981
- First holder: Peggy Simson Curry

The poet laureate of Wyoming is the poet laureate for the U.S. state of Wyoming. The position of poet laureate was created by executive order in 1981 with a variable term of service. The post became a customary two-year term starting on statehood day (July 10).

== List of poets laureate ==
- Peggy Simson Curry (1981 – 1987)
- Charles L. Levendosky (1988 – 1995)
- Robert Roripaugh (1995 – 2003)
- David Romtvedt (2004 – 2011)
- Patricia Frolander (2011 – 2013)
- Echo Roy Klaproth (2013 – 2015)
- A. Rose Hill (2015 – 2016)
- Eugene M. Gagliano (2016–2023)
- Barbara Smith (2023– )

== See also ==
- Poet laureate
- List of U.S. state poets laureate
- United States Poet Laureate
