= Yevgeny Zharinov =

Russian literary critic (born 1954)

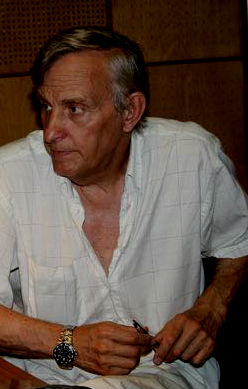

Yevgeny Viktorovich Zharinov (Russian: Евгений Викторович Жаринов; born 26 June 1954) is a Russian writer, literary critic, publicist, translator. Professor of the Department of World Literature, Faculty of Philology, Moscow State Pedagogical University.

== Biography ==
Yevgeny was born on 26 June 1954 in Moscow. In 1971 he graduated from school. In 1972-1973 he studied at the Moscow Aviation Institute. In 1974 he entered Moscow State Pedagogical University's Faculty of Philology, in 1979 he graduated with an Honors Diploma, and began teaching in school. In 1985 he defended his thesis on the works of Leo Tolstoy. Engaged in the translation from English of modern novels, in particular, is known as one of Ursula Le Guin's translators of A Wizard of Earthsea, and the detectives of Phillip Margolin. In 1999 he defended his doctoral thesis on Western fiction. Member of the Union of Writers of Russia.

=== Personal life ===
He is married, he has two sons, Nikolai and Stanislav.
