= David Herter =

American author

David Herter is an American author. His first novel was Ceres Storm (2000), chosen as one of the ten best books of 2000 by the Elliott Bay Book Company, followed by Evening's Empire in 2002. Ceres Storm is a far-future space opera, telling of a boy's quest across a solar system ravaged by a nano-plague. Evening's Empire, set on the Oregon coast, concerns a bereaved opera composer drawn to the small town of Evening, and to mysteries that accord strangely with his current project, an adaptation of Jules Verne's 1870 novel Twenty Thousand Leagues Under the Seas.

Real-life composers figure heavily in Herter's First Republic trilogy (comprising On the Overgrown Path (2006), The Luminous Depths (2008) and One Who Disappeared). Set in interbellum Czechoslovakia, the trilogy stars Leoš Janáček, Pavel Haas, Arnold Schoenberg and Igor Stravinsky, as well as the writer Karel Čapek and his artist-brother Josef Čapek. The narrative employs modes of science fiction, fantasy and horror found in the works of Čapek and Franz Kafka, among others, and weaves a story that crosses and recrosses the fault lines of the short-lived Czechoslovak Republic. Critic and author Brian Stableford says in his introduction to One Who Disappeared, "David Herter’s trilogy, to which One Who Disappeared provides a spectacular and moving conclusion, does not fall; on the contrary, it remains perfectly suspended, sturdy and elegant—and by virtue of its topography, it does not, like more myopic literary projects, taper off into soothing closure, but opens wide to an even vaster and more glorious universe of possibility."

Herter lives in Seattle, Washington.

== Bibliography ==
=== Novels and novellas ===
- Ceres Storm (Tor, 2000)
- Evening's Empire (Tor, 2002)
- October Dark (Earthling Publications, 2010)

==== "First Republic" trilogy ====
- On the Overgrown Path (PS Publishing, 2006)
- The Luminous Depths (PS Publishing, 2008)
- One Who Disappeared (PS Publishing, 2011)

=== Short stories ===
"Black and Green and Gold"

- Featured in Postrscripts 3 edited by Peter Crowther (PS Publishing, 2005)
- Also featured in The Mammoth Book of Best New Horror: The Year's Best Terror Tales edited by Stephen Jones (Running Press, 2006) ISBN 0-7867-1833-1

"Islands Off the Coast of Capitola, 1978"

- A Tor.com Original

== References and links ==
- David Herter's blog
- Entry on David Herter in the Science Fiction Encyclopedia
