= Confessions of a Teen Sleuth =

Book by Chelsea Cain

Confessions of a Teen Sleuth: A Parody
- Author: Chelsea Cain
- Language: English
- Subject: Nancy Drew
- Genre: Parody
- Published: 2005
- Publisher: Bloomsbury
- Publication place: United States
- Media type: Print (hardback, paperback), ebook
- Pages: 208 pages
- ISBN: 978-1582345116 First edition hardback

Confessions of a Teen Sleuth: A Parody is a 2005 parody novel by American writer Chelsea Cain. The book is a parody of the Nancy Drew mystery series published under the collective pseudonym Carolyn Keene and created by Edward Stratemeyer. The novel purports to be the true story of Nancy Drew, who claims that Keene was a former college roommate who plagiarized her life story while also misrepresenting Drew in the process. It incorporates characters from the mystery series while also including or mentioning characters from other series such as The Hardy Boys, Cherry Ames, and Encyclopedia Brown.

== Synopsis ==
In the novel Drew claims that she and Carolyn Keene were roommates together during college and that Keene was very jealous of her. Keene later went on to plagiarize Drew's life story in a series of popular mystery novels, which Drew stated took a large amount of liberty with the truth. When she complained to the publisher, Drew was told that Keene was a pseudonym and not a real person.

As the book progresses Drew participates in several adventures and mysteries, many of which cause her to cross paths with Frank Hardy. The two share a deep love with one another, however Nancy chooses to remain with Ned Nickerson because he offers her stability that Frank cannot due to the danger and requirements of his military career. This causes strain in her relationship with Ned, particularly as she and Frank periodically meet up with one another when participating in various adventures. During the course of her marriage with Ned she has two children, one of whom is implied to be the result of an affair with Frank. She and Ned ultimately make peace with each other and remain married, as they truly do love one another, parting only when Ned dies from a heart attack.

An elderly Drew eventually meets up with Keene after learning that she will be one of the authors at an anniversary party for the publisher of the Nancy Drew series. Keene tells her that Edward Stratemeyer is the actual creator of the Nancy Drew series and that she was just hired to write them - and that he also created a number of other series, one of which is The Hardy Boys. Unable to gain Keene's admission that she took Drew's life story, Drew is determined to write her own autobiography and finishes her memoirs in a week's time. The book ends with Nancy reconnecting with Frank, the two finally free to be together romantically.

== Release ==
Confessions of a Teen Sleuth was first published in the United States in hardback and ebook format in 2005 through Bloomsbury.

== Reception ==
Critical reception for Confessions of a Teen Sleuth were generally positive. Melanie Rehak of The New York Times reviewed the book upon its release, writing that "Chelsea Cain's gleeful parody "Confessions of a Teen Sleuth" affectionately hits all the formulaic high points of a Nancy Drew mystery, sending up and yet saluting America's favorite girl detective." NPR and January Magazine also reviewed Confessions of a Teen Sleuth, with the former stating "Cain's love of the Nancy Drew books and her ability to draw out and twist every ridiculous morsel from the originals combine to make for an hour or two of tremendously entertaining reading." The reviewers for The Ledger were mixed, as they "were split on whether the book is an affectionate spoof or a nasty, nostalgia-wrecking insult to the world’s best-known fictional girl detective."
