= Louis Darling =

American illustrator and conservationist

- Darling (published 1963)
- Born: April 26, 1916; Stamford, Connecticut
- Died: January 21, 1970 (aged 53); Norwich, Connecticut
- Occupation: Illustrator
- Spouse: Lois MacIntyre Darling (1917–1989)

Louis Darling, Jr. (April 26, 1916 – January 21, 1970) was an American illustrator, writer, and environmentalist, best known for illustrating the Henry Huggins series and other children's books written by Beverly Cleary. He and his wife Lois provided illustrations for the first edition of Silent Spring.

== Biography ==
Darling was born in Stamford, Connecticut, and would live in Connecticut for most of his life. He attended the Grand Central School of Art in New York City. After graduation and two years of private study, he worked at an agency for a time before enlisting in the Army Air Force in 1942. He served in the Air Force as a photographer for four years.

He married zoologist and artist Lois MacIntyre in 1946. They would remain married until his death, and frequently collaborated on both writing and illustration. They had no children. His mother-in-law, Grace, was a painter as well.

Also in 1946, Darling was hired by William Morrow and Company to illustrate Roderick Haig-Brown's book A River Never Sleeps. Subsequently, he began illustrating, and then writing, children's books, mostly for Morrow. He was assigned to Beverly Cleary's first book, Henry Huggins, in 1950, which began his best-known association; he would illustrate most of Cleary's books until his death. The character of Huggins was called a "modern Tom Sawyer" in the 1950s.

He wrote his first book, Greenhead, in 1954. He would later write: "I started to write my own books because it seemed to me that there was seldom enough cooperation between author and illustrator. The best way to get this cooperation was to become the author myself."

In 1962, the Darlings' friend Roger Tory Peterson suggested to Rachel Carson that they be hired to illustrate her forthcoming book, Silent Spring. Their illustrations would be used on the chapter headings and the title page of the first edition.

Darling wrote and illustrated The Gull's Way, a book about American herring gulls on an island in Maine, which was published in 1965. To research it, he had camped alone on the uninhabited island for six weeks, observing and photographing the gulls. The book won the John Burroughs Medal in 1966.

His final collaboration with Lois was A Place in the Sun: Ecology and the Living World, published in 1968. Darling died of cancer in 1970 with Cleary dedicating her book Runaway Ralph to him.

== Environmental activism ==
Darling had been interested in nature and the outdoors his entire life, and was an early environmentalist and conservationist. He was the president of Connecticut Conservationists, a consortium of environmentalist groups formed to oppose the dredging of Long Island Sound for the Connecticut Turnpike. The organization unsuccessfully sued the state of New York in 1956 to prevent the action, although they were successful in reducing the size of a planned parking lot that was to be built in a Connecticut salt marsh.

== Awards ==
- 1966: John Burroughs Medal, for The Gull's Way

== Published books ==
One of Darling's illustrations for Beverly Cleary's 1962 book Henry and the Clubhouse.

As writer and illustrator

- Darling, Louis (1954). Greenhead. New York: Wm. Morrow. OCLC 1594142.
- Darling, Louis (1955). Chickens and How to Raise Them. New York: Wm. Morrow. OCLC 299182795.
- Darling, Louis (1955). Seals and Walruses. New York: Wm. Morrow. OCLC 1408226.
- Darling, Louis (1956). Penguins. New York: Wm. Morrow. OCLC 1295097.
- Darling, Louis (1958). Kangaroos and Other Animals with Pockets. New York: Wm. Morrow. OCLC 1409914.
- Darling, Lois; Darling, Louis (1959). Before and After Dinosaurs. New York: Wm. Morrow. OCLC 896781.
- Darling, Lois; Darling, Louis (1960). Sixty Million Years of Horses. New York: Wm. Morrow. OCLC 1260106.
- Darling, Lois; Darling, Louis (1961). The Science of Life. Cleveland: World Pub. Co. OCLC 1593449.
- Darling, Lois; Darling, Louis (1962). Bird. Boston: Cambridge Riverside Press. OCLC 486821752.
- Darling, Louis (1962). Turtles. New York: Wm. Morrow. OCLC 676809.
- Darling, Lois; Darling, Louis (1963). Coral Reefs. Cleveland: World Pub. Co. OCLC 1409527.
- Darling, Louis (1965). The Gull's Way. New York: Wm. Morrow. OCLC 556202.
- Darling, Lois; Darling, Louis (1965). The Sea Serpents Around Us. Boston: Little, Brown. OCLC 1417527.
- Darling, Lois; Darling, Louis (1968). A Place in the Sun: Ecology and the Living World. New York: Wm. Morrow. ISBN 0-688-21485-1. OCLC 182940270.
- Darling, Lois; Darling, Louis (1972). Worms. New York: Wm. Morrow. OCLC 706332.

As illustrator only

- Haig-Brown, Roderick (1946). A River Never Sleeps. Toronto: Collins. OCLC 624324789.
- Dudley, Ruth (1949). Hank and the Kitten. New York: Wm. Morrow. OCLC 558156459.
- Beim, Jerrold (1950). Swimming Hole. New York: Wm. Morrow. OCLC 299379.
- Cleary, Beverly (1950). Henry Huggins. New York: Wm. Morrow. OCLC 4999826.
- Cleary, Beverly (1951). Ellen Tebbits. New York: Wm. Morrow. OCLC 503222613.
- Cook, Marion Belden (1951). Waggles and the Dog Catcher. New York: Wm. Morrow. OCLC 1577443.
- Beim, Jerrold (1952). Country Garage. New York: Wm. Morrow. OCLC 469497.
- Cleary, Beverly (1952). Henry and Beezus. New York: Wm. Morrow. OCLC 1417088.
- Beim, Jerrold (1953). Eric on the Desert. New York: Wm. Morrow. OCLC 1621631.
- Cleary, Beverly (1953). Otis Spofford. New York: Wm. Morrow. OCLC 299530.
- Beim, Jerrold (1954). Shoeshine Boy. New York: Wm. Morrow. OCLC 12553763.
- Cleary, Beverly (1954). Henry and Ribsy. New York: Wm. Morrow. OCLC 426226131.
- Beim, Jerrold (1955). Country School. New York: Wm. Morrow. OCLC 12420079.
- Cleary, Beverly (1955). Beezus and Ramona. New York: Wm. Morrow. OCLC 1417040.
- Beim, Jerrold (1956). Thin Ice. New York: Wm. Morrow. OCLC 469561.
- Butterworth, Oliver (1956). The Enormous Egg. Boston: Little, Brown and Co. ISBN 0-316-11920-2. OCLC 299175.
- Beim, Jerrold (1957). Time for Gym. New York: Wm. Morrow. OCLC 1621668.
- Cleary, Beverly (1957). Henry and the Paper Route. New York: Wm. Morrow. OCLC 6019646.
- Goetz, Delia (1957). Tropical Rain Forests. New York: Wheaton. OCLC 223063797.
- Cameron, Eleanor (1958). Mr. Bass's Planetoid. Boston: Little, Brown and Co. OCLC 907282.
- Goetz, Delia (1958). The Arctic Tundra. New York: Wm. Morrow. OCLC 1267500.
- Constant, Alberta Wilson (1959). Miss Charity Comes to Stay. New York: Crowell. OCLC 1219116.
- Goetz, Delia (1959). Grasslands. New York: Wm. Morrow. OCLC 305464.
- Leonard, Jonathan N. (1959). Exploring Science. Cleveland: World Pub. Co. OCLC 1304200.
- McClung, Robert M. (1960). Shag. New York: Wm. Morrow. OCLC 469394.
- Goetz, Delia (1961). Swamps. New York: Wm. Morrow. OCLC 305491.
- Adler, Bill (1961). Kids' Letters to President Kennedy. New York: Wm. Morrow. OCLC 1078280.
- Carson, Rachel (1962). Silent Spring. Cambridge, Mass.: Riverside Press. OCLC 561302.
- Cleary, Beverly (1962). Henry and the Clubhouse. New York: Wm. Morrow. OCLC 254363281.
- Goetz, Delia (1962). Mountains. New York: Wm. Morrow. OCLC 305489.
- Cleary, Beverly (1964). Ribsy. New York: Wm. Morrow. OCLC 179215.
- Cleary, Beverly (1965). The Mouse and the Motorcycle. New York: Wm. Morrow. OCLC 299528.
- Cleary, Beverly (1968). Ramona the Pest. New York: Wm. Morrow. OCLC 426226140.
- Cleary, Beverly (1970). Runaway Ralph. New York: Dell. OCLC 429583247.
- Goetz, Delia (1970). Islands of the Ocean. New York: Wm. Morrow. OCLC 48167999.
