= Henry and Beezus =

Novel by Beverly Cleary

- First edition
- Author: Beverly Cleary
- Illustrator: Louis Darling
- Language: English
- Series: Henry Huggins
- Publisher: Morrow
- Publication date: 1952
- Publication place: United States
- Pages: 192 pp
- Preceded by: Henry Huggins
- Followed by: Henry and Ribsy

Henry and Beezus is the second book in the Henry Huggins series. This humorous children's novel was written by Beverly Cleary and published in 1952. Henry comes up with many ways to earn money for the new red bicycle he wants, but they all seem to end up with him in trouble. Finally his friend Beezus gives him an idea that actually works.

== Plot overview ==
Henry Huggins really wants a bicycle, but his family can't afford one this year. One of the older boys in the neighborhood, Scooter McCarthy, has a new red bike, and Henry imagines himself riding one up and down Klickitat Street just like Scooter. So he decides to start a bicycle fund, and save up the $59.95 himself. But he only earns a penny for every empty Coke bottle turned in for recycling, so it will take a long time to get that bike. Each chapter centers around Henry's ideas to get a bicycle, including selling boxes of bubble gum he found abandoned in an alley and buying a bike from an auction.

One day Henry and his family attend the grand opening of the town's new supermarket. At the event, Henry's name is drawn in a raffle to receive $50 worth of beauty-treatment coupons at the supermarket's beauty parlor. After his friend Beezus Quimby asks to buy one of the coupons from him, Henry manages to turn his initial humiliation at winning what he had considered a useless prize into a windfall; he agrees to sell Beezus the coupon she wants, and his mother helps to stir up interest amongst her friends and acquaintances for the majority of the rest. After Henry raises nearly $50 selling the coupons, Mr. Huggins decides to make up the difference, and Henry triumphantly rides home from the bicycle shop on his shiny new bike.

== Reception ==
Reviewers appreciated the humorous situations in Henry and Beezus. The reviewer for the Chicago Tribune called it "A very funny sequel to Henry Huggins." Children's book expert May Hill Arbuthnot noted that it "involves some hilarious situations". Kirkus Reviews gave Henry and Beezus a starred review for "books of remarkable merit", saying, "There's the kind of adventure with which any small boy could identify himself; there's humor and a basic understanding of children." It also called the book "A minor classic".

== Illustrations ==
The original illustrations were by Louis Darling. Later editions were illustrated by Tracy Dockray. The 2014 edition had illustrations by Jacqueline Rogers.
