= Henry and the Paper Route =

Novel by Beverly Cleary

- First edition
- Author: Beverly Cleary
- Cover artist: Louis Darling
- Language: English
- Series: Henry Huggins
- Publisher: Morrow
- Publication date: 1957
- Publication place: United States
- Preceded by: Henry and Ribsy
- Followed by: Henry and the Clubhouse

Henry and the Paper Route is a book of Henry Huggins series that was written by Beverly Cleary and illustrated by Louis Darling. It was written in 1957 and focused on the main character Henry Huggins' attempts to get a paper route, despite his young age.

== Plot ==
The book opens with Henry's desiring to do "something important." His older friend Scooter McCarthy rides by on his paper route, and he asks Henry if he knows of any boys who might be interested in delivering papers. Henry eagerly volunteers, but Scooter points out that all paper boys must be 11 years old. Henry is ten and a half, but Scooter still refuses.

Henry decides to visit Mr. Capper, the manager of the local paper routes, and ask him for a job. On the way, he stops at a rummage sale and ends up buying some kittens. These cause him some embarrassment when he visits Mr. Capper, who tells him he's not old enough for a route. In an attempt to impress Mr. Capper and get the job, Henry decides to sell subscriptions to the newspaper. He offers the kittens as free gifts to new subscribers. This idea doesn't work out, and he gives the kittens to the local pet store. Henry ends up buying back one of the kittens - with his father's permission - and names it Nosy. Henry is worried how his dog Ribsy will react, but Ribsy actually takes to Nosy quite well.

During the school's paper drive, Scooter asks Henry to take over his route for an afternoon. Henry uses Scooter's newspapers to advertise for the paper drive. Scooter, enraged at Henry's stewardship of his route, makes it into a competition. However, Henry, with his friends' help, wins the Paper Drive for the school. Unfortunately, it's a bit too successful for Henry's taste, and he vows not to advertise the following year.

Henry soon turns eleven years old, and later discovers that Scooter has caught chicken pox. Scooter once again asks him to take over his route; as a result, he and Henry become good friends again. Henry then learns that one of the older boys will be giving up his route soon, and Henry hopes to take it over. In the meantime, he meets a new neighbor named Murph, whom he suspects is a genius.

Henry is later dismayed to learn that he doesn't get to take over the older boy's route; it's been given to Murph instead. Eventually, though, Murph gives up the route because he doesn't know how to handle Ramona Quimby, who is taking the papers off of each customer's lawn and throwing them onto random lawns because she too wants to be a "paper boy".

Murphy lets Henry have the route, and at first Henry is worried that he might lose it because of Ramona's antics. He eventually outsmarts Ramona, though, and continues with his new route.
