= Katie Hickman =

English novelist, historian and travel writer

Katie Hickman FRSL
- Born: 1960 (age 65–66); Wellington, New Zealand
- Education: Wycombe Abbey; Pembroke College, Oxford (B.A.), (M.A.)
- Occupations: Novelist; historian; travel writer
- Children: 2
- Website: katiehickman.com

Katie Hickman (born 1960) is an English novelist, historian and travel writer. She was born in Wellington, New Zealand, to the diplomat and author John Kyrle Hickman and Jennifer Olive (Love) Hickman. She is the author of ten books, including two best-selling history books, which between them have sold more than a quarter of a million copies worldwide. Her travel book A Trip to the Light Fantastic was one of The Independent's Books of the Year (1993) and was short-listed for the Thomas Cook Travel Book Award (1994). Her fiction works have earned a nomination for the Sunday Times Young British Writer of the Year Award (The Quetzal Summer, 1993) and her trilogy of historical novels The Aviary Gate (2008), The Pindar Diamond (2011) and The House at Bishopsgate (2016) have been translated into 20 languages. She is featured in the Oxford University Press guide to women travellers, Wayward Women.

Hickman was elected a Fellow of the Royal Society of Literature (FRSL) in 2026.

== Biography ==
Hickman was born into a diplomatic family in 1960 and spent the first twenty-five years of her life living abroad in Spain, Ireland, Singapore and South America. The influence of travel on her life and being the daughter of a diplomatic spouse played a big part in her choice of subject matter as a writer. She was educated at Wycombe Abbey school, in England where she was a scholar, and at Pembroke College, Oxford, where she read English Literature, graduating with a B.A. and an M.A.

In 1987, she married the photographer Tom Owen Edmunds, with whom she had travelled across Bhutan, inspiring her first book: Dreams of the Peaceful Dragon, together they had a son: Luke Owen Edmunds. Their marriage ended and Hickman married the philosopher A. C. Grayling in 1999, together they had a daughter, Madeleine Grayling. Their marriage ended in 2017. Hickman now lives on a converted barge on the River Thames in London with her partner, the designer Matthew Ruscombe-King.

== Writing career ==
After Oxford, Hickman began to travel and to write. Her first book, Dreams of the Peaceful Dragon (1987), is an account of her journey across Bhutan on horseback. Finding inspiration in a culture largely untouched by the trappings of the 20th century, she became one of the first white women ever to travel to the furthest eastern regions of Bhutan.

In 1992, Hickman published her first novel The Quetzal Summer, which was shortlisted for the Sunday Times Young British Writer of the Year Award. Set in South America and London, this is the story of an English girl whose native Indian nurse means more to her than her mother.

In 1993, she followed it with A Trip to the Light Fantastic, an account of a year spent living and working with a Mexican circus, eventually performing in the circus herself. A Trip to the Light Fantastic was shortlisted for the Thomas Cook Travel Book Award and was reissued in 2014 as Travels with a Mexican Circus.

Hickman then turned to write history books. Daughters of Britannia: The Lives and Times of Diplomatic Wives (1999) rose to number two in the Sunday Times Bestseller list and was serialised on the BBC Radio 4 series Woman's Hour. Drawing on letters, private journals, and memoirs, Daughters of Britannia explores three centuries of British diplomacy as seen through the eyes of nearly 100 diplomatic wives, sisters and daughters.

Hickman followed this with her second history book, Courtesans: Money, Sex and Fame in the Nineteenth Century (2003), exploring the parallel world of 18th and 19th-century courtesans, telling the exceptional stories of five outstanding women.

Five years later, Hickman produced her second novel: The Aviary Gate (2008), the first in a trilogy set in the early seventeenth century Constantinople, Venice, London, and rural Wiltshire, which became a bestseller in Italy, selling more than 50,000 copies in hardback alone. This was followed by the second in the trilogy, The Pindar Diamond (2011), concluding with The House at Bishopsgate (2016).

More recently, Hickman returned to writing about history with She-Merchants, Buccaneers and Gentlewomen (2019), a recounting of the stories of the first British women to set foot in India in the early 17th century and her latest: Brave Hearted: The Dramatic Story of Women of the American West (2022), which won the 2023 WILLA Literary Award in Creative Nonfiction.

== Titles ==
Travel

- Dreams of the Peaceful Dragon: A Journey Into Bhutan (1987)
- A Trip to the Light Fantastic (1993) (republished in 2014 as Travels with a Mexican Circus)

Historical

- Daughters of Britannia: The Lives and Times of Diplomatic Wives (1999)
- Courtesans: Money, Sex and Fame in the Nineteenth Century (2003)
- She-Merchants, Buccaneers and Gentlewomen: British women in India 1600 – 1900 (2019)
- Brave Hearted: The Dramatic Story of Women of the American West (2022)

Fiction

- The Quetzal Summer (1992)
- The Aviary Gate (2008)
- The Pindar Diamond (2011)
- The House at Bishopsgate (2016)
