= Evening's Empire =

2002 novel by David Herter

- Author: David Herter
- Cover artist: Shelley Eshkar
- Language: English
- Genre: Science fiction
- Publisher: Tor Books
- Publication date: June 2002
- Publication place: United States
- Media type: Hardcover
- Pages: 352
- ISBN: 978-0-312-87034-8
- OCLC: 48966730
- Dewey Decimal: 813/.6 21
- LC Class: PS3558.E7938 E94 2002

Evening's Empire is a science fiction novel by American writer David Herter, published in 2002. It is the author's second novel after 2000's Ceres Storm.

== Plot introduction ==
The book follows the travels of a man to the small town of Evening, Oregon, where his beloved wife was killed in a freak accident the year before. The novel relies heavily on surrealism and a lolling suspense that is never realized in any sort of actual climax. Nonetheless, the book retains a small following of fans that greatly admire its "mature" style and few reviewers have considered it a poor effort.

== Literary significance and reception ==
Regina Schroeder in her review for Booklist said, "Herter's blending of contemporary fantasy and Kent's Verne opera-in-progress is seamless and intense, and his creation of Downstairs fascinating but terrible. An exquisite, subtle performance." Charles De Lint reviewing for Fantasy & Science Fiction said, "there is far more to praise in Evening's Empire than to criticize. It's true that I couldn't help but be a little disappointed that its early promise of wonder and character depth, sustained through most of the book, didn't resolve with a similar flair and innovation. Yet even if the end doesn't quite measure up to Herter's ambitions, at least he made the effort to break some new ground. And mostly he succeeded." Peter Cannon reviewing for Publishers Weekly said, "while the novel's promotional copy compares it with Gene Wolfe's Peace and Charles de Lint's Newford stories, the cop-out ending is not one either of those pros would have chosen. But all the good writing that goes before suggests that Herter should gain the necessary mastery of his craft in due course."
