= Henry and Ribsy =

Novel by Beverly Cleary

- First edition
- Author: Beverly Cleary
- Cover artist: Louis Darling
- Language: English
- Series: Henry Huggins
- Published: 1954 (Morrow)
- Publication place: United States
- Pages: 192 pp
- Preceded by: Henry and Beezus
- Followed by: Henry and the Paper Route

Henry and Ribsy is the third book in the Henry Huggins series of humorous children's novels written by American author Beverly Cleary. First published in 1954, Henry and Ribsy was originally illustrated by American illustrator Louis Darling. In the book, Henry's dad has promised to take him salmon fishing on one condition – he has to keep his dog Ribsy out of trouble for two months. That's not easy to do, especially when Ramona Quimby gets involved.

== Plot ==
Henry wants to go on a salmon-fishing trip with his father. However, Ribsy has been causing a lot of trouble for the family. For example, after Henry got the job of taking out the garbage, whenever the garbage man comes, Ribsy tries to prevent the garbage man from taking away the trash because Ribsy thinks it belongs to Henry. Henry's father says that Henry can only come salmon fishing if he can keep Ribsy out of trouble for a month. Henry is able to do this, and Ribsy actually helps him catch an enormous 30 pounder salmon at the end of the day.
