= K. L. Cook =

American writer

K. L. Cook is an American writer from Texas. He is the author of Last Call (2004), a collection of linked stories spanning thirty-two years in the life of a West Texas family, the novel, The Girl From Charnelle (2006), and the short story collection, Love Songs for the Quarantined (2011). His most recent books are a collection of short stories, Marrying Kind (2019), a collection of poetry, Lost Soliloquies (2019), and The Art of Disobedience: Essays on Form, Fiction, and Influence (2020). He co-directs the MFA Program in Creative Writing & Environment at Iowa State University and teaches in the low-residency MFA in Writing Program at Spalding University.

== Last Call ==
Last Call (University of Nebraska Press 2004) was the inaugural winner of the Prairie Schooner Book Prize in Fiction. Stories in the collection were originally published in literary journals such as Threepenny Review, American Short Fiction, Shenandoah, and Post Road. Two of the stories won the Grand Prize in the 2002 Santa Fe Writers Project Literary Arts Series.

Set mostly in Texas and the American Southwest, the stories sympathetically depict the blue-collar lives of oil riggers, railroad and steel construction workers, x-ray technicians, waitresses, and a con man who tries to buy Costa Rica and examine themes of multi-generational family dynamics, adolescence, and the tension between work and personal relationships.

== The Girl from Charnelle ==
The Girl from Charnelle (William Morrow 2006/Harper Perennial 2007) deals with the same family of characters in 1960, focusing on the middle daughter, Laura Tate, who is left to take care of her father and brothers after the mother of the family mysteriously disappears. Set in the fictional Texas Panhandle town of Charnelle, against the backdrop of the Kennedy/Nixon presidential election, the novel examines the intellectual and erotic coming of age of a young woman, as well as the legacy of parental abandonment.

The Girl from Charnelle was on several 2006 "best books" lists. It won the WILLA Literary Award for Contemporary Fiction, was an Editor's Choice selection of the Historical Novel Society, and was named a Southwest Book of the Year, a School Library Journal Best Adult Book for High School Students, and a Mississippi Press/Gulf Coast Live Top Three Books of the Year. It was also a finalist for the James Jones First Novel Award.

== Love Songs for the Quarantined ==
Love Songs for the Quarantined (Willow Springs Editions 2011) won the 2010 Spokane Prize for Short Fiction. It includes sixteen stories, most of which were previously published in literary journals, including Glimmer Train and One Story; a number of the individual stories won prizes in their own right. "Filament," which initially appeared in One Story, was included in Best American Mystery Stories 2012, selected by Robert Crais. "Bonnie and Clyde in the Backyard," which originally appeared in Glimmer Train, won the Best Short Fiction Award from the Western Writers of America, was cited as a distinguished story in Best American Short Stories 2010, and selected for inclusion in the anthology Best of the West 2011.

== Marrying Kind ==
Marrying Kind (Ice Cube Press 2019), Cook's third collection of linked stories, explores the people, vocations, and places we wed ourselves to. Several of the nine stories revisit the working class, hardscrabble characters and themes of Cook's earlier books (including Laura Tate, the title character from The Girl from Charnelle). This collection also moves into new narrative and thematic territory and includes stories from the perspective of a Shakespearean actor ("Portrait of a Shakespearean Actor as a Young Man"), a disgraced academic couple seeking refuge in Florida ("Morning of the Shark"), and a pair of stories about an historian and his wife, an attorney ("Day of the Dean" and "Puppy").

== Lost Soliloquies ==
Lost Soliloquies (Ice Cube Press 2019), Cook's debut collection of poems, consists primarily of dramatic monologues, persona poems, and soliloquies in the voices of both historical and fictional characters, including Clyde Barrow, Frank Lloyd Wright, and secondary and off-stage characters from Othello and Macbeth.

== The Art of Disobedience ==
The Art of Disobedience: Essays on Form, Fiction, and Influence (Ice Cube Press 2020) collects eighteen essays on the process, art, and craft of writing, drawn from Cook's decades of teaching. "The best art is always disobedient," Cook argues in the introductory essay. "The creative works that move us, compel us, provoke us, haunt us, and transform us--the works that matter most to us and that we cherish--break the rules in significant ways. Certainly, characters act out, act up, transgress, and misbehave. But the writer must also surprise, subvert, deconstruct, and engage in serious mischief in terms of genre, form, or sensibility, in order to make the familiar strange and the strange familiar."

The essays in the first section, "Habits of Art," explore the methods writers use to motivate themselves, thirty theories about the aim and purpose of fiction, twenty ways to artistically misbehave as a fiction writer, workshop philosophy and practice, and point-of-view strategies. The essays in the second section, "Forms of Fiction," examine ways of conceptualizing form in narrative writing and include notable essays on secrecy plots ("The Secret Story"), narrative strategy and dramatic design, stories as love songs ("Every Story Is a Love Song"), and the form that most of Cook's own books have taken—short story cycles, linked stories, and novels-in-stories. The final section, "Under the Influence," investigates both literary and nonliterary influences and includes ambitious essays that combine memoir with literary criticism, especially essays on the late Larry McMurtry (fellow Texan writer who Cook wrote his master's thesis in literature about) and Sena Jeter Naslund (the bestselling author of Ahab's Wife and founding director of Spalding University's low-residency MFA in Writing Program, where Cook has been a member of the graduate faculty since 2004). The final and most personal essay, "My Hamlet," tracks Cook's intimate thirty-five year relationship with Shakespeare's play—as a student, actor, English professor, writer, son, father, brother, and heart-attack survivor.

== Journal and anthology publications ==
Cook has published essays, poetry, reviews, and other stories in such journals and magazines as Glimmer Train, One Story, Prairie Schooner, The Threepenny Review, Poets & Writers, Writer's Chronicle, American Short Fiction, Harvard Review, Shenandoah, and The Louisville Review and contributed to several anthologies, including Best American Mystery Stories 2012, Teachable Moments: Essays on Experiential Education (2006), Now Write: Fiction Exercises from Today's Best Writers and Teachers (2006) and When I Was a Loser: Essays on (Barely) Surviving High School (2007).

== Additional honors ==
Cook is the recipient of an Arizona Commission on the Arts fellowship for fiction, several Pushcart Prize nominations, and artist colony fellowships to the MacDowell Colony, Yaddo, Ucross, and Blue Mountain Center.

== Personal ==
Cook was born in Dumas, Texas. He is married to the playwright and poet, Charissa Menefee, who is a professor of English and Theatre at Iowa State University. They have four children and live in Ames, Iowa.

== Teaching ==
Since 2013, he has taught at Iowa State University, where he currently co-directs the MFA Program in Creative Writing & Environment. In 2021, he received a College of Liberal Arts & Sciences Award for Excellence in Graduate Teaching from ISU and was named the Dean's Faculty Fellow in the Arts. From 1992 to 2013, he taught creative writing and literature at Prescott College in Arizona, where for several years he served as the Arts & Letters Chair and Associate Dean of Academic Affairs. Since 2004, he has been a member of the graduate faculty at the Spalding University low-residency MFA in Writing Program.
