= Ron Silverman =

American actor, film and television producer and writer (1932–2025)

- Born: October 13, 1932
- Died: July 23, 2025 (aged 92); Medford, Oregon, U.S.
- Education: University of Arizona
- Occupations: Film and television producer; television writer; actor
- Years active: 1957–1988
- Employer: American Film Institute
- Organization: Southern Oregon PBS; Rogue Valley Symphony; Craterian Theater
- Children: 2

Ron Silverman (October 13, 1932 – July 23, 2025) was an American actor, film and television producer and television writer, who later became the dean of studies at the American Film Institute. He attended the University of Arizona. He began his career as a writer for The Wild Wild West and other United Artists programs and pilots, before transitioning into films.

Silverman died in Medford, Oregon, on July 23, 2025, at the age of 92. His death was not announced until two months later, on September 30.

== Producing credits ==
- Stoney Burke (1963, associate, 3 episodes)
- OK Crackerby! (1965–66, associate, 11 episodes)
- Buster and Billie (1974)
- Lifeguard (1976)
- Brubaker (1980)
- Krull (1983)
- The Last Innocent Man (1987, TV movie)
- Shoot to Kill (1988)
