= The Last Innocent Man =

- 1995 VHS cover
- Genre: Thriller
- Based on: The Last Innocent Man by Phillip M. Margolin
- Screenplay by: Dan Bronson
- Directed by: Roger Spottiswoode
- Starring: Ed Harris; Roxanne Hart
- Theme music composer: Brad Fiedel
- Country of origin: United States
- Original language: English

Production
- Executive producer: Maurice Singer
- Producers: Dan Bronson; Donna Dubrow; Ron Silverman
- Production location: Portland, Oregon
- Cinematography: Alexander Gruszynski
- Editors: Lois Freeman-Fox; Paul Seydor
- Running time: 109 minutes
- Production company: HBO Pictures

Original release
- Network: HBO
- Release: April 19, 1987

The Last Innocent Man is a 1987 American made-for-television thriller film directed by Roger Spottiswoode that aired on HBO. The teleplay by Dan Bronson is based on the novel by Phillip M. Margolin.

== Plot ==
A criminal defense attorney is seduced by a beautiful woman and reluctantly takes on the defense of her estranged husband who is charged with murder, but finds his career threatened because of the circumstances.

== Cast ==
- Ed Harris as Harry Nash
- Roxanne Hart as Jenny Stafford
- David Suchet as Jonathan Gault
- Bruce McGill as Burt Matson
- Darrell Larson as Philip Stafford
- Clarence Williams III as D.J. Johnson
- Rose Gregorio as Monica Powers
- Robert Lesser as Jerry Landau
- Joe Mays as Lester Grimes
- Meshach Taylor as Crosby
- Michael Durrell as District Attorney
- Frank Koppala as Tony Seals
- Charles Lampkin as Judge Clement Autley
- Robert Biheller as Thorp
- Lance Rosen as District Attorney

== Production ==
Filming took place in Portland, Oregon.

== Broadcast ==
It was first broadcast on HBO on April 19, 1987.
