= Lois Darling =

American author & illustrator (1917-1989)

Lois Darling (born MacIntyre)
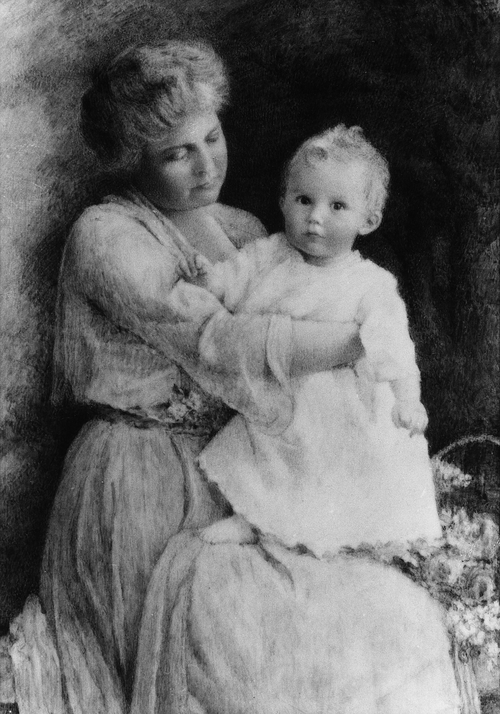
- Grace Hamilton McIntyre holding a young Lois MacIntyre (Darling). Painting by Grace Hamilton McIntyre, 1918.
- Born: August 15, 1917; New York City, New York
- Died: December 19, 1989 (aged 72); Old Lyme, Connecticut
- Occupations: Author and Illustrator
- Spouse: Louis Darling (m. 1946; died 1970)
- Mother: Grace Hamilton McIntyre

Lois MacIntyre Darling (August 15, 1917 – December 19, 1989) was an American author, illustrator and researcher. She was an accomplished yachtswoman.

== Biography ==
Lois MacIntyre was born in 1917 in New York City and grew up around Riverside, Connecticut. MacIntyre's father, Malcolm, was a mechanical engineer whilst her mother Grace (born Hamilton) was a skilled artist. She was keen on sailing and won the 1941 National Women's Sailing Championship.

During the Second World War, Darling worked for the U.S. Navy where she combined her artistic skills and her interest in sailing by creating models of warships. In 1946 she met and married her husband, Louis Darling, which launched a lifelong collaboration. Both also worked independently too. He worked in children's books and she created illustrations which included covers for the magazine Yachting.

In 1959 she became involved in work to commemorate the centenary of Charles Darwin's On the Origin of Species and she was intrigued by the ship that had carried Darwin on his original research. Darling built a model of HMS Beagle for the American Museum of Natural History and then continued to gather information on the vessel. For twenty years she continued her research publishing her findings in articles. Her work culminated in her first solo book which was published in 1977. Her model of the Beagle is still part of the museum's collection.

She illustrated a number of books although many were in collaboration with her husband Louis. Her book on the Beagle followed twenty years of research. The depth of her research was proved when a professional artist used her expertise to enable him to create a picture of FitzRoy's Beagle which allowed for the many modifications made to the ship to prepare her for Captain Robert FitzRoy's voyages of discovery.

In 1962, the Darlings' friend Roger Tory Peterson suggested to author Rachel Carson that Louis and Lois be hired to illustrate her forthcoming book, Silent Spring. Their illustrations would be used on the chapter headings and the title page of the first edition.

Her final collaboration with her husband was A Place in the Sun: Ecology and the Living World, published in 1968. Louis died of cancer in 1970.

Darling died at age seventy-two on December 19, 1989, of leukemia at Lawrence and Memorial Hospital in New London, Connecticut.

== Works ==
=== Illustrations ===
- Sou’West and by West (1948) (by Llewellyn Howland)
- Evolution of the Vertebrates (1955) (by Edwin H. Colbert)
- Before and After the Dinosaurs (1959)
- Sixty Million Years of Horses (1960)
- The Science of Life (1961)
- Bird (1962)
- Silent Spring (1962) (by Rachel Carson)
- Coral Reefs (1963)
- The Sea Serpents Around Us (1965)
- The Appalachians (1965) (by Maurice Brooks)
- General Ecology (1967)
- A Place in the Sun (1968)
- Dos Uno (1969)
- Worms (1972)

== Author ==
- H.M.S. Beagle: Further Research, or Twenty Years a-Beagling (1977)
