= Melanie Benjamin (author) =

American author

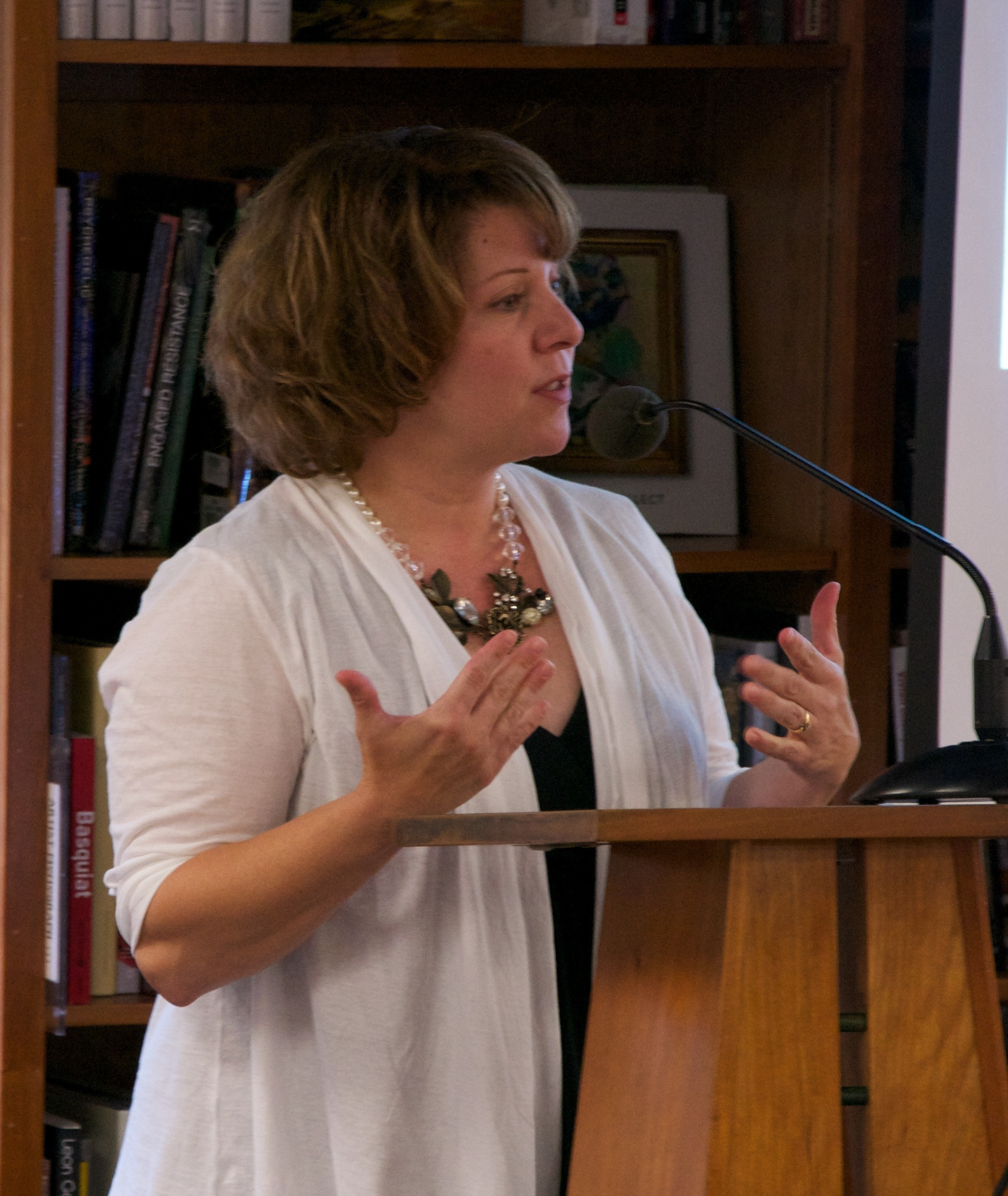
- Benjamin in 2011

Melanie Benjamin (born November 24, 1962) – is the pen name of American writer Melanie Hauser (née Miller).

== Personal life ==
Born November 24, 1962, in Indianapolis, Indiana, Melanie is one of three children. Melanie attended Indiana University--Purdue University at Indianapolis then married Dennis Hauser in 1988; they presently reside in the Chicago, Illinois area with their two sons. Melanie is a member of the Random House Speakers Bureau.

== Publishing history ==
As Melanie Hauser, she published short stories in the In Posse Review and The Adirondack Review. Her short story "Prodigy on Ice" won the 2001 "Now Hear This" short story competition that was part of a WBEZ (Chicago Public Radio) – program called Stories on Stage, where short stories were performed and broadcast.

When Melanie sold her first of two contemporary novels, she had to add Lynne to her name (Melanie Lynne Hauser) – to distinguish her from the published sports journalist Melanie Hauser. The first of Melanie's contemporary novels, Confessions of Super Mom was published with Dutton in 2005; the sequel Super Mom Saves the World was published by New American Library in 2007. In addition to her two contemporary novels, Melanie also contributed an essay to the anthology IT'S A BOY and maintained a popular mom blog called The Refrigerator Door.

Under the pen name Melanie Benjamin (a combination of her first name and her son's first name), she shifted genres to historical fiction. Her third novel, Alice I Have Been, was inspired by Alice Liddell's life. Published in 2010 by Delacorte Press, Alice I Have Been was a national bestseller and reached the extended list of The New York Times Best Seller list. In 2011, Benjamin fictionalized another historical female. Her novel The Autobiography of Mrs. Tom Thumb focuses on the life of Lavinia Warren, a proportionate dwarf featured in P. T. Barnum's shows. Meredith Eaton optioned the film rights for The Autobiography of Mrs. Tom Thumb in December 2011.

Melanine Benjamin published a third historical fiction novel in 2013. The Aviator's Wife revolves around the historic personage of Anne Morrow Lindbergh. It was a New York Times bestseller in both hardcover and paperback. In addition it was a USA Today bestseller as well as an Indie Next List choice in both hardcover and paperback. The Aviator's Wife has been optioned for film by Vandalia Films, Jennifer Garner's production company.

In 2021 Melanie Benjamin published The Children's Blizzard, which won the 2022 WILLA Literary Award in Historical Fiction.

== Bibliography ==
As Melanie Hauser:

- Confessions of Super Mom (2005) – ISBN 978-0525949107
- Super Mom Saves the World (2007) – ISBN 0-45122-036-6

As Melanie Benjamin:

- Alice I Have Been (2010) – ISBN 978-0385344142
- The Autobiography of Mrs. Tom Thumb (2011) – ISBN 978-0385344159
- The Aviator's Wife (2013) – ISBN 978-0345528674
- The Swans of Fifth Avenue (2016) – ISBN 978-0345528698
- Girls in the Picture (2018) – ISBN 978-1101886809
- Mistress of the Ritz (2019) – ISBN 978-0399182242
- The Children's Blizzard (2021) – ISBN 978-0399182280

== See also ==
- Supermom
