= Tucket's Gold =

1999 novel by Gary Paulsen

- Tucket's Gold first edition cover.
- Author: Gary Paulsen
- Cover artist: Jos. A. Smith
- Language: English
- Series: The Tucket Adventures
- Genre: Western novel Juvenile fiction
- Publisher: Delacorte Books
- Publication date: September 7, 1999
- Publication place: United States
- Media type: Print (hardback & paperback)
- Pages: 112 pp (first edition)
- ISBN: 978-0-385-32501-1
- OCLC: 40645786
- LC Class: PZ7.P2843 Tt 1999
- Preceded by: Tucket's Ride
- Followed by: Tucket's Home

Tucket's Gold is the fourth novel in The Tucket Adventures series by American author Gary Paulsen, first published in 1999. It features the main character Francis Tucket and his adopted children struggling to stay out of reach of the Comancheros.

== Background ==
Paulsen originally got the idea for the character of Francis Tucket through an urge to cover the West with a single person. Tucket's Gold was first published in 1999 by Delacorte Books. It was the fourth novel in the Tucket Adventures saga and was followed by the fifth and final novel in the series, Tucket's Home.

Fours years later after it was first published, Random House republished it in a five-part omnibus entitled Tucket's Travels. The omnibus included the five novels from the Tucket Adventures saga, which were published over a timeframe of 1994 to 2000.

== Synopsis ==
Tucket's Gold is mainly about Tucket and his adventures to escape the Comancheros. He is in need of food and water when the story begins, but his luck gets better. He finds a deer for food and moccasins, and finds gold, showing that he is having a change of fortune.

== Reception ==
Tucket's Gold was favorably received by critics and the mainstream press. It was praised for its invigorating story; a reviewer from publishers weekly said that it had superb characterizations and an evoked setting.
