= Grace Hamilton McIntyre =

American painter (1878–1962)

- Born: 1878
- Died: 1962 (aged 83–84)
- Education: Veltin School for Girls
- Occupation: Painter
- Style: Portrait miniature
- Spouse: Malcolm McIntyre (m. 1910)
- Children: Lois

Grace Hamilton McIntyre (1878–1962) was an American painter of portrait miniatures.

What little is known of McIntyre's life comes from a manuscript biography written by her daughter, Lois Darling. She was a native of Staten Island who moved with her family to Nebraska, where her father was one of the founders of the first beet-sugar business in the United States. By 1893 she was back in New York City at the Veltin School for Girls on the Upper West Side. She did well in china painting, and later also studied the painting of miniatures. In 1899 she traveled to Europe with her neighbors, the Fabers; on her return she painted miniatures on commission from family and friends. She married Malcolm McIntyre, a mechanical engineer, in 1910, and ceased painting after Lois, the couple's only child, was born in 1917. Her work was shown at the National Academy of Design as part of exhibitions by the American Society of Miniature Painters in 1915 and 1916; after the family moved to Riverside, Connecticut, she exhibited in local libraries several times. A number of her pieces are currently in the collection of the Metropolitan Museum of Art.
