= Doomsday Plus Twelve =

1984 novel by James D. Forman

- Author: James D. Forman
- Language: English
- Genre: post-apocalyptic
- Publisher: Charles Scribner's Sons
- Publication date: 1984
- Publication place: United States
- Media type: Novel (hardcover)
- Pages: 230
- ISBN: 0-684-18221-1
- OCLC: 11159100
- LC Class: PZ7.F76 Do 1984
- Preceded by: Call Back Yesterday

Doomsday Plus Twelve is a 1984 post-apocalyptic novel by James D. Forman.

== Plot introduction ==
The story is set in 2000, twelve years after the world nuclear war known as "Doomsday." A group of Oregon teenagers seek to use peaceful protest to stop militarists in San Diego from using the nuclear missiles on a captured nuclear submarine against Japan.

== Plot ==
In 1988, an incident in Saudi Arabia touches off World War III between the United States and the Soviet Union. Things get out of hand and nuclear weapons are used; U.S. deaths number 120 million. The effects of EMP, ozone, and epidemics (California was dusted with anthrax) are depicted.

Twelve years later people living in a rural Oregon have survived with their only contact with the outside world coming from Japanese merchants who have built a base near them. They are later, however, visited by representatives from San Diego, one of the few U.S. cities to survive the war. The visitors preach their plan to restore the United States by driving out the Japanese with a nuclear submarine that survived the war and ask for volunteers to join their army. Most people are not interested in their message but when the militants launch an attack on the Japanese merchant base it inspires a trek to San Diego led by a charismatic young girl to peacefully protest their actions.

On the way they meet various groups of survivors: a gang of Hells Angels bikers who join up with them, monks living in a still functioning observatory, and refugees in the desert living in abandoned military vehicles.

When they arrive in San Diego they find the city in ruins (the missile that was supposed to hit exploded in the ocean causing a tsunami that destroyed the city). They peacefully march into the base discovering that the militants were too afraid of their own soldiers to provide them with ammo and the nuclear submarine they boasted about had long since sunk to the ocean floor.

== Major themes ==
Critics have compared the novel to Kim Stanley Robinson's The Wild Shore and have remarked on its pacifist theme.

== See also ==
- The Postman
