= Tucket's Home =

2000 novel by Gary Paulsen

- First edition
- Author: Gary Paulsen
- Audio read by: John Randolf Jones
- Language: English
- Series: The Tucket Adventures
- Publisher: Random House
- Publication date: 2000
- Publication place: United States
- Media type: Print (hardback & paperback)
- Preceded by: Tucket's Gold

Tucket's Home is the fifth novel in The Tucket Adventures by American author Gary Paulsen, published in 2000 by Random House. The audiobook is narrated by John Randolf Jones.

It was later turned into a five-part omnibus, entitled Tucket's Travels, along with the rest of the novels in The Tucket Adventures by Random House and released in 2003.

== Plot ==
Francis finally recovers from a rattlesnake bite, and he continues the trek to Oregon with Lottie and Billy. On their way they encounter a greenhorn English adventurer and his servants, Jason Grimes, murderous outlaws, and a wagon train of men heading west to establish farms for their families. At the end of the novel, they find Francis's family and start businesses with the gold and silver they had found in the Spaniard's grave. Billy becomes a sailor. Francis and Lottie develop feelings for each other, get married, run the businesses, and farm the land. It ends by saying that Francis thinks about Mr. Grimes before he sleeps every night.
