= Ribsy =

1964 novel by Beverly Cleary

- First edition
- Author: Beverly Cleary
- Illustrator: Louis Darling
- Language: English
- Series: Henry Huggins
- Publisher: William Morrow & Co.
- Publication date: September 1, 1964
- Publication place: United States
- Pages: 128 pp
- Preceded by: Henry and the Clubhouse

Ribsy is a children's book by Beverly Cleary. It is the sixth and final book in the Henry Huggins series. Henry plays a minor role in the story, however, inasmuch as the narrative focuses primarily on his dog, Ribsy.

== Plot ==
Like most of the Henry Huggins books, the incidents in this one follow an ongoing plot line. In it, the Hugginses get a new car, and go out shopping. Ribsy, denied a ride, chases it at up to 25 miles per hour, and is finally allowed inside. At the mall he is left in the car, but manages to lower the electric window by pressing a button.

After exploring on his own, Ribsy eventually wants to return to await Henry, and gets into the first new-smelling car he finds. But a different family with several young daughters and a toddler son get in it and take him home with them. He endures a bubble bath and escapes, wandering in search of Henry.

Ribsy finds an old lady named Mrs. Frawley who tells him to go away, but when he raises his paw in greeting she invites him in. After she feeds him dinner, he sleeps while she goes out to shop for her new pet. He dislikes wearing a coat and colorful leash, so he escapes. Soon after, he finds himself becoming the unofficial mascot for a class of elementary school students, until he is kicked out over an incident with a squirrel.

Later, Ribsy sneaks into a high school football game, wanders onto the field, and helps win the game by accidentally tripping a player. He is caught by a boy who, pleased at the attention he gets for people thinking it was his dog who won the game, takes him in. The newspaper coverage of the game gains the attention of the Hugginses, who attempt to retrieve him. However after hearing Henry's voice on the phone, he runs off in search of him.

Later, Ribsy is found by a boy with a tennis ball, who lives in an apartment building. He decides to adopt him, but panics when confronted by his landlady and hides him on a fire escape. There, he is spotted by the Hugginses as they drive through the neighborhood in search of him. Mr. Huggins manages to retrieve him with the help of some nearby workmen, and he is happily reunited with Henry. The Hugginses offers the boy, whose name is Larry, a portion of the reward and help him deal with his landlady. Ribsy sits beside Henry in the car as they drive home, finally reunited.
