= Henry and the Clubhouse =

Novel by Beverly Cleary

- First edition
- Author: Beverly Cleary
- Illustrator: Louis Darling
- Series: Henry Huggins
- Genre: Children's Realistic Fiction
- Publisher: Dell/Yearling
- Publication date: 1962
- ISBN: 9780380709151
- Preceded by: Henry and the Paper Route
- Followed by: Ribsy

Henry and the Clubhouse, by Beverly Cleary, is the fifth book in Henry Huggins series. Now that he has the paper route he wanted so badly in the previous book, Henry and the Paper Route, Henry finds that it's harder than he expected. His earnings are going for the clubhouse he and his friends are building. One of the boys insists that it be a "Boys Only" club, and that causes trouble with Henry's friend Beezus Quimby and her little sister Ramona. Henry and the Clubhouse was published in 1962.

== Plot ==
Henry Huggins is the youngest boy in town to have a paper route. He takes his job very seriously, and works hard to make his father proud of him. He likes the responsibility, but he doesn't like the "collecting" aspect of the job; trying to get his customers to pay him on time. And when he goes to the new neighbor's house to sell her a subscription, his dog Ribsy embarrasses him by starting a fight with her Dalmatian. When little Ramona Quimby starts following him around trying to help, the other paper deliverers make fun of them, and all of his ideas to get rid of her seem to backfire.

Henry and his two friends Robert and Murph decide to build the world's best clubhouse in Henry's backyard, using wood donated by one of Henry's customers. The only problem is, Murph can't stand girls, and he insists that it be a "Boys Only" clubhouse. Henry doesn't like excluding his good friend Beezus Quimby, but he agrees to go along anyway. One day, Ramona locks Henry in the clubhouse and he can't get out until he reveals the secret password to Beezus, whom Ramona had gone to for help.

It isn't easy to have a job, a major building project, and friends who don't get along. But one winter day Henry feels sorry for Ramona, following him around in the deep snow, and takes her home on his sled before finishing his paper route. His kindness is noticed by one of his customers, who writes a letter to the editor praising him, and Henry ends up making his father proud.

== Critical reception ==
Critics appreciated Cleary's humor, characterization and realistic plot, as seen in this review. "Beverly Cleary continues to provide a measure of relief from the suffocating flood of books about unreal talking animals and stock characters in the way of dogs and ponies and horses -- for her cast of characters can be matched in any average town and recognized as the children `round the block... But the things that happen seem real and there's humor for all ages in the story." About both the Ramona and Henry Huggins series, Choosing Books for Kids write, "Cleary's characters, situations, and dialogue ring true and deal with recognizable problems eights and nines have at school and at home."

== Adaptations and editions ==
Television programs based on Henry Huggins in Japanese, Spanish, and Swedish;

Audio formats: Henry and the Clubhouse is available on audiobook and CD from HarperAudio and cassette from Recorded Books;

Print/English: Braille editions available from Avon, eBook from Dell Publishing, large print through HarperTrophy;

Worldwide: As of 2010 Henry and the Clubhouse is available in 70 editions in seven languages.
