= Craig Lesley =

American novelist (born 1945)

- Born: 1945 (age 80–81); The Dalles, Oregon, U.S.
- Education: Whitman College; University of Kansas; University of Massachusetts Amherst
- Occupations: Memoirist; novelist
- Spouse: Kathryn Stavrakis
- Children: 3
- Writing career
- Notable awards: Pacific Northwest Booksellers Association Award (x3); Oregon Book Award (2000)
- Website: www.craiglesley.com

Craig Lesley (born 1945) is a memoirist and novelist of the modern American west. He has been nominated twice for the Pulitzer Prize, first for his novel The Sky Fisherman in 1996, and again for Storm Riders in 2001. He has received three Pacific Northwest Booksellers Association Awards, and an Oregon Book Award. His novel Winterkill was the first to win the Golden Spur award for Best Novel and Medicine Pipe Bearer's for Best First Novel from the Western Writers of America He has been the recipient of several national fellowships and holds a Doctorate of Humane Letters from Whitman College.

== Biography ==
Born in 1945 in The Dalles, Oregon, Lesley was educated at Whitman College, the University of Kansas, and the University of Massachusetts Amherst. Prior to his life in academia, Lesley was a river guide, a longshoreman, and a farmworker, nearly losing his life at the age of 15 when his pelvis was crushed in an accident with a mint harvester. Lesley's working-class background informs his writing, and is an integral part of his re-interpretation of the myths of the American West. Lesley is currently Senior Writer in Residence at Portland State University, and a faculty member in the Pacific University low-residency MFA program.

He lives in Portland, Oregon with his wife Kathryn Stavrakis. He has three adult children; two daughters and a son.

== Works ==
- Burning Fence: A Western Memoir of Fatherhood, New York: Picador, 2005. ISBN 978-0-312-42625-5
- Storm Riders, New York: Picador, 2000. ISBN 0-312-24554-8
- The Sky Fisherman, New York: Picador, 1995. ISBN 0-312-14738-4
- River Song, New York: Picador, 1989. ISBN 0-312-24491-6
- Winterkill, New York: Picador, 1984. ISBN 0-312-15244-2

Lesley has edited two collections of short stories:

- Talking Leaves: Contemporary Native American Short Stories, New York: Random House, 1991. ISBN 0-385-31272-5
- Dreamers and Desperados: Contemporary Fiction of the American West. ISBN 0-440-50517-8
