= Gone, But Not Forgotten (novel) =

1993 novel by Phillip Margolin

- Author: Phillip Margolin
- Language: English
- Publisher: Doubleday
- Publication date: September 1, 1993
- Publication place: United States
- Pages: 376
- ISBN: 0-385-47002-9
- OCLC: 30817765
- Dewey Decimal: 813/.54 20
- LC Class: PS3563.A649 G66 1993

Gone, But Not Forgotten is a 1993 novel written by attorney Phillip Margolin and set in Portland, Oregon. The book was later adapted to a television miniseries.

== Plot summary ==
Elizabeth "Betsy" Tannenbaum is a successful defense lawyer coming off a domestic violence case win when she is hired by reclusive and mysterious businessman Martin Darius to defend him against allegations that he murdered several women and a private investigator and dumped the bodies at a construction site. Unfortunately, Darius' past misdeeds are revealed and Betsy is in a race against time to find out who the real killer is before he — or she — strikes again.

== Characters ==
=== Major ===
- Elizabeth "Betsy" Tannenbaum: Defense attorney hired by Martin Darius to defend him. Mother of Kathy, estranged wife of Rick.
- Martin Darius: Alter ego of accused but pardoned serial killer Peter Lake, who falsely imprisoned and tortured several women, then tried to cover it up by murdering his wife and daughter and framing another. He moves to Portland after being pardoned by the Governor of New York and starts his life over undisturbed, before "the rose killer" begins striking again. Eventually on his way to being convicted of murdering a private investigator to cover up an affair.
- Alan Page: District Attorney for Multnomah County, Oregon, including Portland. He prosecutes Darius, but always finds himself a step behind.
- Samantha Reardon: The Portland "Rose Killer", she duplicates Darius' crimes in Hunter's Point, New York, to get even with him for torturing her. She is declared insane and committed.
- Raymond Colby: Former Governor of New York, he awarded a pardon to Lake after the Hunter's Point killings, allowing him to go free. Despite his best efforts to find him, Lake disappears and Colby jealously guards the secret — until he becomes a U.S. Senator and pursues the job of Chief Justice of the Supreme Court.
- Nancy Gordon: Detective in the Hunter's Point Police Department (HPPD), she always thought Lake was the culprit and chased him for many years until she was coopted by Reardon.

=== Secondary ===
==== In Hunter's Point ====
- Anne Hazelton: Lake's first victim. She committed suicide after being freed.
- Gloria Escalante: Lake's second victim. Lives a reclusive life with husband Pedro, a doctor.
- Patricia Cross: Lake's third victim. Found butchered in Henry Waters' basement.
- Sandra and Melody Lake: Peter's final victims. Found in his house, Sandra defaced, Melody's neck broken.
- Henry Waters: A deliveryman of slow mental faculties mistakenly believed to be the killer and shot by police in his house during questioning.
- Simon Reardon: Samantha's estranged husband, who committed and then divorced her after she attacked him.
- Pedro Escalante: Gloria's husband, who is very protective of her.
- Frank Grimsbo: Detective on the HPPD who investigates the case, later made head of security at Colby's company, Marlin Steel.
- Wayne Turner: Case investigator on the HPPD task force and later Colby's administrative assistant.
- John O'Malley: Chief of HPPD, retired after disappearances.
- Glen Michaels: Criminologist and forensics expert on the HPPD task force

==== In Portland ====
- Laura Farrar, Wendy Reiser and Victoria Miller: In order, the three women Reardon killed during her Portland spree.
- Samuel Oberhurst: A private investigator hired by Lisa Darius-Ryder to find evidence of Martin cheating.
- Lisa Darius: Martin's frightened wife.
- Oscar Montoya: He takes over the case after Reardon confesses.
- Victor Ryder: Oregon Supreme Court Justice and Lisa's father.
- Patrick Norwood: Case judge.
- Reggie Stewart: Betsy's investigator.
- Randy Highsmith: Multnomah County DA Office prosecutor.
- Detective Ross Barrow: Portland policeman working Rose Killer case.
- Rick Tannenbaum: Betsy's estranged husband, killed by Reardon.
- Kathy Tannenbaum: Betsy's daughter, who wants to grow up to be a detective. Kidnapped by Reardon to force Betsy to set up Darius.

== TV adaptation ==
The novel was adapted in a similarly titled American television miniseries, Gone But Not Forgotten. It starred Brooke Shields as Betsy Tannenbaum and Lou Diamond Phillips as Alan Page. Although the novel was set in Portland, Oregon, the miniseries was set in Sacramento, California. The miniseries was filmed in 2004 and was originally intended to broadcast on Hallmark Channel but ended up going direct-to-DVD the next year, and then premiered on Lifetime in 2006.
