= Ceres Storm =

2000 novel by David Herter

- First edition (publ. Tor Books); Cover art by Alan Pollack
- Author: David Herter
- Genre: Science fiction
- Publisher: Tor Books
- Publication date: November 4, 2000
- ISBN: 978-0-312-87493-3

Ceres Storm is a 2000 science fiction novel by American author David Herter.

In the distant future on a terraformed Mars, Daric discovers that he is a clone of a former Emperor of Earth named Darius. Daric is kidnapped by Kay-Tee agents in an attempt to bring him to earth to open Darius' complex that was sealed long ago. He escapes and begins a journey that takes him to an asteroid, Triton and Pluto's moon Charon.

Ceres Storm received reviews from Fantasy and Science Fiction, Kirkus Reviews, Library Journal, and Publishers Weekly.
