= Jane Kirkpatrick =

American novelist

- Education: University of Wisconsin–Milwaukee
- Occupations: Writer; speaker; teacher; mental health director
- Spouse: Jerry
- Writing career
- Language: English
- Period: 1991–present
- Genres: Inspirational, Historical
- Website: www.jkbooks.com

Jane Kirkpatrick is an American writer from Oregon who has written many inspirational fiction and non-fiction books.

== Background ==
Jane Kirkpatrick attended University of Wisconsin–Milwaukee, where she initially majored in English before switching to social work, eventually earning a master's degree. She went on to work in this field for three decades. When visiting Oregon while looking for a job, she fell in love with the area and moved to Bend in 1974.

After selling several freelance articles, she quit her job and moved with her husband to a 160 acre ranch near the John Day River. When the ranch required more money than anticipated, she found a part-time job in social work at the reservation of Warm Springs where she worked for 17 years. It was a two-hour commute, so she would live in a trailer for a few days a week at the reservation. There, she would write every night. Back at the ranch, she wrote from 5 to 7 o'clock in the morning before chores. In 1991 she wrote her first book, Homestead about her experience building the ranch.

While at the reservation, she heard a story about a woman and her husband who started a hotel along the Deschutes River and sought out to write a biography of the woman, Jane Sherar. When she couldn't find enough original source material, she decided to write a novel instead. Sweetness to the Soul was the result. Published in 1996, it was named the outstanding Western novel of 1996 by the Oklahoma-based Western Heritage Center. Since then, she has researched and written at least one book a year.

In 2010, her husband Jerry had a stroke, and although he recovered, they had to move back to Bend where they currently reside. In addition to writing, she continues to promote her books, often up to three weekends a month.

== Writing philosophy ==
=== Historical fiction ===
Kirkpatrick describes the factual history in a book as "the spine of the book" and dialogue as "approximate speech". Characters who are based on real people are "enhanced", while others are created.

When she gets an idea or suggestion for a book, she puts it in storage files. Sometimes she spends years collecting information before she writes her books. Once she has settled on an idea, she spends months researching. This can take her to rural libraries, museums, and even interviewing relatives of the people she is writing about. Often she will stumble across something that will give her an idea for another book. What she collects goes into binders and files in boxes she keeps in a bedroom closet.

Right before beginning to write, she asks herself three questions: "What is the story about; what is my attitude toward the story; and what is my purpose for writing it?" Then, she comes up with a theme statement in three sentences that is attached to her computer screen. After that, she writes a timeline and plans characters. When she finally gets to writing the book, she says, "I have an idea for the start and end and then I just start writing."

=== Religious fiction ===
"I am a Christian, but I'm hopeful that anyone can read these and find inspiration," Kirkpatrick says about her books. Her original editor, Dudley Delffs, attributes her popularity to being different from other Christian fiction authors by focusing on her story rather than the message.

== Published works ==
=== Series ===
==== Dreamcatcher ====
- A Sweetness to the Soul (1995)
- Love to Water My Soul (1996)
- A Gathering of Finches (1997)
- Mystic Sweet Communion (2013)

==== Kinship And Courage ====
- All Together In One Place (2000)
- No Eye Can See (2001)
- What Once We Loved (2001)

==== Tender Ties ====
- A Name of Her Own (2002)
- Every Fixed Star (2003)
- Hold Tight the Thread (2004)

==== Change And Cherish ====
- A Clearing in the Wild (2006)
- A Tendering in the Storm (2007)
- A Mending At the Edge (2008)
- Emma of Aurora: The Complete Change and Cherish Trilogy (omnibus) (2013)

==== Portraits of the Heart ====
- A Flickering Light (2009), winner of the 2010 WILLA Literary Award in Original Softcover Fiction (Trade or Mass Market)
- An Absence So Great (2010)

=== Stand-alone novels ===
- A Land of Sheltered Promise (2005)
- The Daughter's Walk (2011)
- Barcelona Calling (2011)
- Where Lilacs Still Bloom (2012)
- One Glorious Ambition (2013)
- A Light In The Wilderness (2014)
- The Memory Weaver (2015)
- This Road We Traveled (2016)
- All She Left Behind (2017)
- Everything She Didn't Say (2018)
- One More River to Cross (2019)
- Something Worth Doing (2020)
- The Healing of Natalie Curtis (2021)

=== Omnibus ===
- The Midwife's Legacy (2012) (with Rhonda Gibson, Pamela Griffin and Trish Perry)

=== Collection ===
- A Log Cabin Christmas (2011) (with Margaret Brownley, Wanda E Brunstetter, Kelly Eileen Hake, Liz Johnson, Debra Ullrick and Erica Vetsch)

=== Non-fiction ===
- Homestead (1991)
- The Burden Shared: Words to Encourage Your Days (1998)
- When the Stars Danced (2001) (with Crying Wind)
- A Simple Gift of Comfort: Healing Words for Difficult Times (2013)
- Aurora: An American Experience in Quilt and Craft (2008)
- Barcelona Calling (2011)
- Promises of Hope for Difficult Times (2013)
