= Chelsea Cain =

American journalist and writer

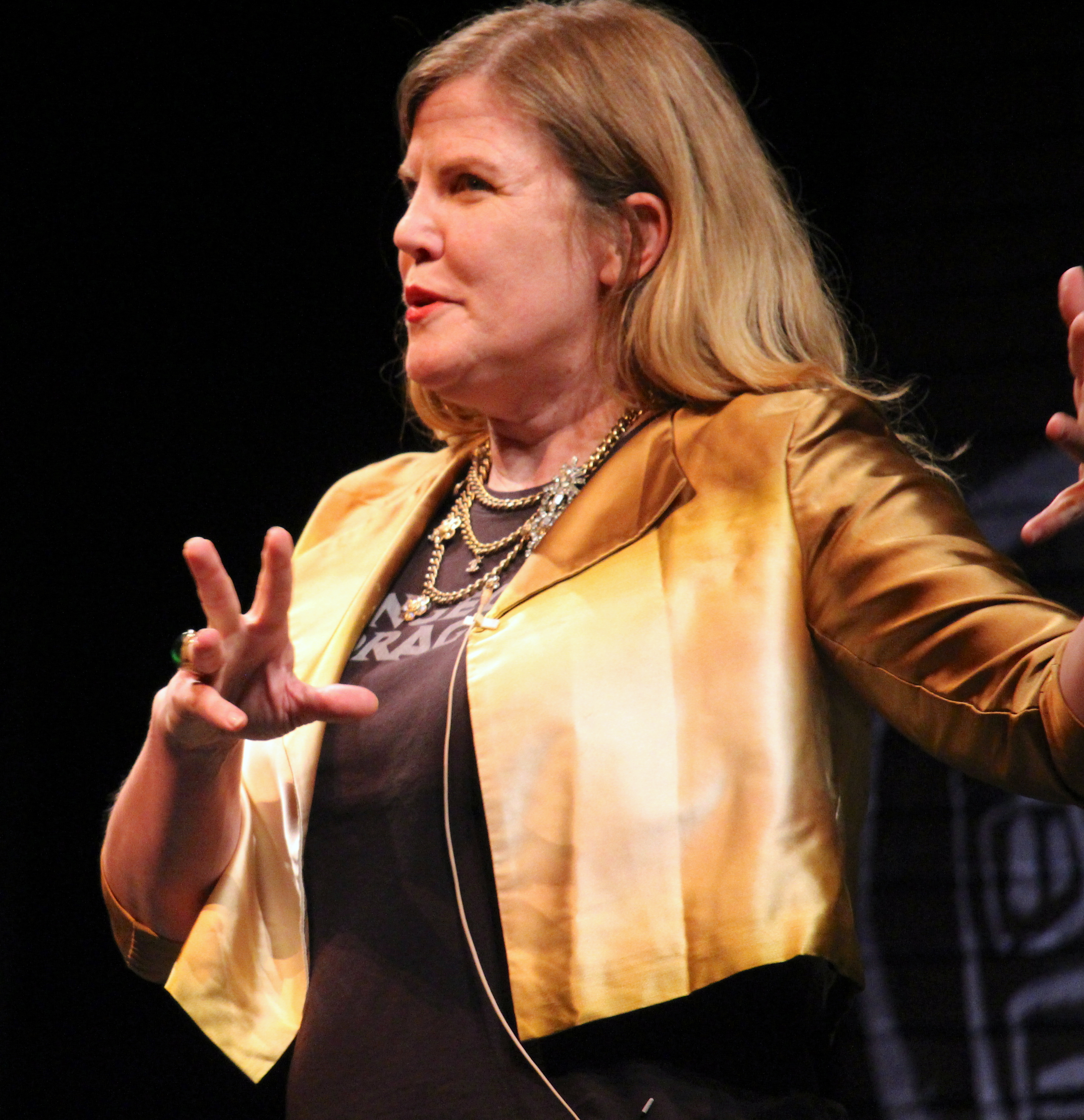
- Cain in 2015
- Born: February 5, 1972 (age 54); Iowa City, Iowa, U.S.
- Education: University of California, Irvine; University of Iowa
- Occupations: Novelist, columnist
- Writing career
- Period: 1996–present
- Notable works: Sweetheart, Heartsick, Evil at Heart
- Website: chelseacain.com

Chelsea Snow Cain (born February 5, 1972) is an American novelist. Her novel, "Heartsick", won the 2007 Edgar Award for Best First Novel. She is best known for her Archie Sheridan-Gretchen Lowell series of thrillers, which feature a Portland homicide detective with a troubled past.

== Biography ==
Cain was born February 5, 1972, in Iowa City, Iowa, and spent her early childhood on a hippie commune outside of Iowa City. Her father dodged the Vietnam draft and her parents lived "underground" for several years.

Cain studied political science at the University of California, Irvine, where she wrote for the New University newspaper and became the opinion editor. After graduating in 1994, she attended the graduate school of journalism at the University of Iowa.

While at Iowa, she wrote a weekly column for The Daily Iowan. Her master's thesis at the University of Iowa became Dharma Girl, a memoir about Cain's early childhood on the hippie commune. One of her professors presented it to several editors for review, and Seal Press picked it up as Cain's first published work. She was 24 years old.

Cain is married to Marc Mohan, a former video store owner and film critic for The Oregonian. They have lived in Southeast Portland since 2006. They have one daughter.

=== Career ===
After working as a creative director at a public relations firm in Portland for several years, Cain began writing humor books, including The Hippie Handbook: How to Tie-Dye a T-Shirt, Flash a Peace Sign, and Other Essential Skills for the Carefree Life (Chronicle Books, 2004), Confessions of a Teen Sleuth (Bloomsbury, 2005), and Does this Cape Make Me Look Fat? Pop-Psychology for Superheroes (Chronicle Books, 2006), which Cain co-wrote with her husband. Cain was, for a time, a weekly columnist for both Portland's alternative newspaper, The Portland Mercury, and Oregon's largest newspaper, The Oregonian.

She wrote her first thriller, Heartsick, in 2004, and it was published on September 4, 2007. In a review in The New York Times, critic Janet Maslin wrote, "In a genre that is rife with copycatting, Ms. Cain deserves some credit for having gotten a potentially interesting new series off the ground." In a blurb for the book, author Chuck Palahniuk wrote, "Chelsea Cain gives us the most compelling, most original serial killer since Hannibal Lecter.”

Sweetheart and Evil at Heart: A Thriller followed as the second and third in the series, respectively. The New York Times critic called Sweetheart "sensual and engulfing."

In March 2016, Cain began writing a new Marvel Comics series, Mockingbird, the first solo series about the character. The series ran for eight issues before cancellation.

Cain is the creator of the comic book series Man-Eaters for Image Comics along with artists Kate Niemczyk and Lia Miternique. Man-Eaters was criticized for failing to account for trans experiences as the plot revolves around a disease that impacts people based on sex-specific symptoms. Cain's response was to print tweets criticizing her in subsequent issues of the book, which resulted in harassment and threats being aimed at her critics, and called into question the legality of publishing tweets. She went on to ask for volunteers to do sensitivity reading, as she stated the book was expensive to produce and she could not offer any pay for the job. Simon & Schuster published Man-Eaters: Tomorrow Belongs to You! in March 2020 and an additional five issue miniseries called Man-Eaters: The Cursed in July 2021.

== Accolades ==
- Named 6th best book of the year (2008) by Stephen King in Entertainment Weekly for Heartsick and Sweetheart
- Amazon Mystery/Thriller of 2007 for Heartsick
- Named one of Four Hot Authors for Fall 2007 by Entertainment Weekly
- Heartsick optioned as a film in September 2007
- Booksense 76 Pick for Heartsick
- Barnes & Noble Developing Writer pick for Heartsick
- New York Times Book Review editor's choice for Heartsick and Confessions of a Teen Sleuth: A Parody

== Bibliography ==
- Dharma Girl (1996)
- Wild Child: Girlhoods in the Counterculture (1999)
- The Hippie Handbook: How to Tie-Dye a T-Shirt, Flash a Peace Sign, and Other Essential Skills for the Carefree Life (2004)
- Confessions of a Teen Sleuth: A Parody (2005)
- Does This Cape Make Me Look Fat? Pop-Psychology for Super Heroes (2006)
- Mockingbird – S.H.I.E.L.D. 50th Anniversary #1 (2015)
- Mockingbird #1–8 (2016)

Gretchen Lowell Series

- Heartsick (2007)
- Sweetheart (2008)
- Evil At Heart (2009)
- The Night Season (2011)
- Kill You Twice (August 2012)
- Let Me Go (August 2013)

Kick Lannigan Series

- One Kick (August 2014)
- Kick Back (unpublished)
