= Robin Cody =

American writer from Oregon

Robin Duncan Cody is an American writer from Oregon. His works include fiction and non-fiction books about nature.

== Biography ==
Robin Cody was born in St. Helens, Oregon. When he was five, his family moved to Estacada, Oregon when his father, Robert Edward Cody, was hired as the grade school principal there. The Codys remained in Estacada for nearly 50 years. Cody graduated from Yale University, taught in the American School of Paris, France, and was the Dean of Admissions for Reed College. In 1984 he became a writer with The Oregonian and one of his stories won the Western Writers of America’s Silver Spur Award for short non-fiction in 1986. Cody joined the Bonneville Power Administration (BPA) as a freelance writer for a time. It was during an assignment for the BPA that he was inspired to canoe the Columbia River from its source to its mouth. The 82-day trip gave birth to his book, Voyage of a Summer Sun, which won the Oregon Book Award in 1995. He teaches seminars and workshops around Portland, Oregon mostly about nature writing.

== Ricochet River ==
Ricochet River, Cody's second book, was first published in 1992 by Blue Heron Publishing, with later editions published by Ooligan Press. It deals with the lives of three high school students in the fictional small town of Calamus, Oregon in the 1960s. The town in the book was based on Oregon.

The book has generated controversy because of what some considered to be "sexually explicit language" not appropriate for high school readers. Parents from Clackamas High School in Oregon attempted to have the book banned in the North Clackamas School District. After student and parent outcry against the banning, the school board voted to keep the book. In response to the criticisms, Cody and publisher Ooligan Press released a new version of the book without the controversial paragraphs.

Ricochet River was one of one hundred works chosen by the Oregon Cultural Heritage Commission for "exemplifying Oregon’s rich literary heritage from the years 1800 to 2000".

Ricochet River was made into a 1998 film starring Kate Hudson which the author did not like.

== Published works ==
1. Umbrella Guide to Bicycling the Oregon Coast (Friday Harbor, WA: Umbrella Books, 1990) ISBN 0-914143-25-5
2. Ricochet River (New York, NY: Knopf, 1992) ISBN 0-679-40431-7
3. Voyage of a Summer Sun (New York, NY: Alfred A. Knopf Incorporated, 1995) ISBN 0-679-41768-0
4. Another Way the River Has: Taut True Tales from the Northwest (Corvallis, OR: Oregon State University Press, 2010) ISBN 978-0-87071-583-9
