= Phillip Margolin =

American writer of legal thrillers

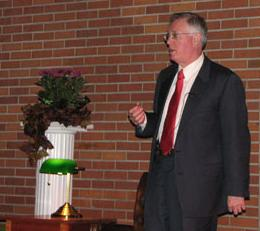
- Born: 1944 (age 81–82); New York City, U.S.
- Education: American University (BA); New York University School of Law
- Occupation: Novelist
- Writing career
- Genre: Legal thriller
- Website: PhillipMargolin.com

Phillip Margolin (born 1944) is an American writer of legal thrillers.

== Biography ==
Margolin was born in New York City in 1944. After receiving a B.A. in government in 1965, from American University in Washington, D.C., he worked as a Peace Corps volunteer in Liberia until 1967. He graduated from the New York University School of Law in 1970, and has worked for 25 years as a criminal defense attorney, an occupation of choice inspired by the Perry Mason books. He started to work in 1970 at the Oregon Court of Appeals.

He published his first story, a short story titled "The Girl in the Yellow Bikini", in 1974, and became a full-time writer in 1996. He has written 12 books as of January 2007. He lists as his favourite writer Joseph Conrad, and among his favourite books War and Peace by Leo Tolstoy and Stone City by Mitchell Smith.

Philip Margolin was married to Doreen Stamm in 1968. They had two children, Ami and Daniel. Doreen, also an attorney, died from cancer in January 2007. In 2018, he married Melanie Nelson.

Phillip Margolin is also the president of Chess for Success, a non-profit organisation "dedicated to helping children develop skills necessary for success in school and life by learning chess".

== Bibliography ==
Title	Year	Publisher	ISBN	Remarks
The Girl in the Yellow Bikini	1974			Short story in Mike Shayne Mystery Magazine
Heartstone	1978	HarperTorch	ISBN 978-0-06-073969-0	
The Last Innocent Man	1981	HarperTorch	ISBN 978-0-06-073968-3	Adapted into the 1987 HBO film The Last Innocent Man starring Ed Harris
Gone, But Not Forgotten	1993	Doubleday	ISBN 978-0-385-47002-5	Translated into more than 20 languages, sold over 1.5 million copies, adapted into the 2005 Warner Bros. TV film Gone But Not Forgotten starring Brooke Shields and Scott Glenn
After Dark	1995	Doubleday	ISBN 978-0-385-47548-8	
The Burning Man	1996	Doubleday	ISBN 978-0-385-48053-6	
Smokescreen	1997	Meulenhoff	ISBN 90-743-3636-1	Only published in Dutch as Rookgordijn, published by Meulenhoff
The Undertaker's Widow	1998	Doubleday	ISBN 978-0-385-48054-3	
Angie's Delight	1998	Delacorte Press		Short story in Murder For Revenge; turned into a 2006 13-minute short film
The Jailhouse Lawyer	1998			Short story in Legal Briefs
Wild Justice	2000	HarperCollins	ISBN 978-0-06-019624-0	Amanda Jaffe Book 1
The Associate	2002	HarperCollins	ISBN 978-0-06-019625-7	
Ties That Bind	2003	HarperCollins	ISBN 978-0-06-008324-3	Amanda Jaffe Book 2
Sleeping Beauty	2004	HarperCollins	ISBN 978-0-06-008326-7	
Lost Lake	2005	HarperCollins	ISBN 978-0-06-073502-9	
Proof Positive	2006	HarperCollins	ISBN 978-0-06-073505-0	Amanda Jaffe Book 3
Executive Privilege	2008	HarperCollins	ISBN 978-0-06-123621-1	Brad Miller and Dana Cutler Book 1
Fugitive	2009	HarperCollins	ISBN 978-0-06-123623-5	Amanda Jaffe Book 4
Supreme Justice	2010	HarperCollins	ISBN 978-0-06-192651-8	Brad Miller and Dana Cutler Book 2
Capitol Murder	2012	HarperCollins	ISBN 978-0-06-206988-7	Brad Miller and Dana Cutler Book 3
Sleight of Hand	2013	HarperCollins	ISBN 978-0-06-206991-7	Brad Miller and Dana Cutler Book 4
Worthy Brown's Daughter	2014	HarperCollins	ISBN 978-0-06-219534-0	Stand-alone Novel
Woman With a Gun	2014	HarperCollins	ISBN 978-0062266521	Stand-alone Novel
Violent Crimes	Feb. 2016	HarperCollins	ISBN 978-0062266552	Amanda Jaffe Book 5
The Third Victim	2018	Minotaur Books	ISBN 978-1-25-011750-2	Robin Lockwood 1
The Perfect Alibi	2019	Minotaur Books	ISBN 978-1-250-11752-6	Robin Lockwood 2
A Reasonable Doubt	2020	Minotaur Books	ISBN 978-1-250-11754-0	Robin Lockwood 3
A Matter of Life and Death	2021	Minotaur Books	ISBN 978-1-250-25842-7	Robin Lockwood 4
The Darkest Place	2022	Minotaur Books	ISBN 9781250258441	Robin Lockwood 5
Murder at Black Oaks	2022	Minotaur Books	ISBN 9781250258465	Robin Lockwood 6
Betrayal	2023	Minotaur Books	ISBN 9781250885791	Robin Lockwood 7
An Insignificant Case	2024	Minotaur Books	ISBN 9781250885821	Stand-alone Novel
False Witness	2025	Minotaur Books	ISBN 9781250356895	Karen Wyatt 1

He has also co-authored Vanishing Acts (Madison Kincaid Mystery) with his daughter Ami Margolin Rome.

== Awards and recognitions ==
- 1978: nominated for an Edgar Award for best original paperback by the Mystery Writers of America for Heartstone
- 1999: the short story The Jailhouse Lawyer is published in the 1999 edition of The Best American Mystery Stories
