= Jennie Shortridge =

Jennie Shortridge (born September 23, 1959) is an American novelist and off-and-on musician.

== Biography ==
Born in Grand Forks, North Dakota Shortridge grew up in Maryland and Colorado before relocating to the Pacific Northwest. She now resides in Seattle, Washington with her Australian husband, Matt Gani.

Citing an unhappy home life with a mentally ill mother, Shortridge ventured out on her own at the age of seventeen and began to support herself through a series of office jobs, cooking jobs, and a stint as a plumber, all the while also performing in bands as a lead singer. A job with a small advertising firm began her marketing career, leading to a position as director of sales and marketing for a Denver visual imaging firm during the 1980s and early 1990s. In 1995, Shortridge "decided to climb back down," the corporate ladder as she says, and began to write full-time as a freelance magazine features writer. Her work appeared in local, regional, and national publications including Natural Home, Mademoiselle, and Glamour.

In 2003, Shortridge’s first novel, Riding with the Queen, was published by New American Library (New York City). The story of a young rock-and-roll singer who leaves home to escape a mentally ill mother, Riding with the Queen was not a fictionalized memoir, according to Shortridge, but rather a new story using her experiences with both. In 2005, she employed similar technique for her second published novel, Eating Heaven, again by NAL, the story of a disenfranchised food writer who comes to term with life by caring for a dying uncle. In her 2008 novel, Love and Biology at the Center of the Universe, NAL, a perfectionist middle-aged woman flees her home and life after discovering her husband has been less than perfect.

When She Flew, Shortridge's fourth novel, NAL Nov. 2009, was inspired by true events in Portland, OR, and tells the story of an Iraq-war vet raising his young daughter in the woods, and the policewoman who finds them and must find the courage to break the rules to help them.

In 2013, Shortridge's fifth novel, Love Water Memory, was published by Gallery Books, a division of Simon and Schuster. Inspired by a news story of an amnesiac and his fiancé, Shortridge wrote a fictional account of a woman who must become like a detective to remember who she is and what happened to her while grappling with a fiancé and the life she left behind.

In 2009, Shortridge founded Seattle7Writers with author Garth Stein, a nonprofit collective of authors who promote Northwest literature and raise money and awareness for literacy in their community. Thirty-six of the fifty-plus members collaborated on a novel as a fundraiser, and it was published by Open Road Media Group in 2010 as Hotel Angeline: A Novel in 36 Voices. Shortridge organized the event and penned the first chapter. All proceeds benefit literacy.

Shortridge also teaches both adults and children how to write, volunteering a good portion of her time to literacy organizations for children, including 826 Seattle.

== Bibliography ==
- Riding With the Queen (ISBN 0451210271 | 2003)
- Eating Heaven (ISBN 0451216431 | 2005)
- Love and Biology at the Center of the Universe (ISBN 0451223888 | 2008)
- When She Flew (ISBN 0451227980 | 2009)
- Hotel Angeline: A Novel in 36 Voices (ISBN 1453258272 | 2011)
- Love Water Memory (ISBN 1451684835 | 2013)
