= Colorado Book Awards =

- Awarded for: Colorado authors, editors, illustrators, and photographers who exemplify the best in their category in the state during a given year
- Sponsored by: Colorado Center for the Book
- Location: Colorado

The Colorado Book Awards are awards presented annually to Colorado authors, editors, illustrators, and photographers who exemplify the best in their category in the state during a given year. Awards have been presented since 1991. The awards are given by the Colorado Center for the Book, itself a program of Colorado Humanities. Awards are selected by a group of judges who are themselves selected on the basis of interest and competence. The common criteria for each category are content, originality, and widespread appeal; each category also has additional criteria appropriate to that category.

== Categories ==
- Fiction
- Non-fiction
- Poetry
- Mystery
- Science fiction
- Colorado & the West
- Biography/Memoir
- Advice
- Collections/Anthology
- Children
- Young Adult
