= Patricia Frolander =

American poet laureate

- Born: 1942 (age 83–84); Boston, Massachusetts, U.S.
- Occupation: Poet
- Children: 1 son, 2 daughters
- Writing career
- Language: English
- Notable works: Grassland Genealogy (2009); Married Into It (2011); Second Wind (2020)
- Notable awards: National Senior Poets Laureate Competition (2009); Neltje Blanchan Memorial Writing Award (2011)

Patricia Frolander (born 1942) is an American poet originally from Boston, Massachusetts. She was poet laureate of Wyoming from November 7, 2011, to June 9, 2013.

Frolander began writing poetry in the mid-1990s. She has written five poetry collections, including Grassland Genealogy (2009), Married Into It (2011), and Second Wind (2020). She won the 17th Annual National Senior Poets Laureate Competition in 2009. In 2011, she won the Neltje Blanchan Memorial Writing Award, sponsored by the Wyoming Arts Council.

She owns and lives on their family ranch in Sundance in the Black Hills area of Wyoming, where she has lived since 1969. She has one son, two daughters, and several grandchildren and great-grandchildren. She was widowed in October 2016.
