= Henry Huggins (novel) =

1950 book by Beverly Cleary

- First edition
- Author: Beverly Cleary
- Illustrator: Louis Darling
- Language: English
- Series: Henry Huggins
- Publisher: Morrow
- Publication date: 1950
- Publication place: United States
- Pages: 183
- Followed by: Henry and Beezus

Henry Huggins is the first book in the Henry Huggins series of children's novels, written by Beverly Cleary. Henry is an ordinary boy who manages to get into funny scrapes with his dog, Ribsy. It was originally illustrated by Louis Darling and later by Tracy Dockray. According to the author, Beverly Cleary, back in 1949, when she wrote it, she declared that she was surprised to having done so at all.

The book was a response to a letter from a child saying, "Where are the books about the kids like us?" One critic called the character of "Henry" the "modern Tom Sawyer."

The character of Henry Huggins returned in later books and also in a play which was written by Beverly Cleary and Cynthia J. McGean.
