= Arnold Lobel bibliography =

Arnold Lobel was a children's author and illustrator. He wrote:

- A Zoo for Mister Muster, in Lobel's Mister Muster series (1962), Lobel's first self-written and illustrated book
- A Holiday for Mister Muster, in Lobel's Mister Muster series (1963)
- Prince Bertram the Bad (1963)
- Giant John (1964)
- Lucille (1964)
- The Bears of the Air (1965)
- Martha the Movie Mouse (1966)
- The Comic Adventures of Old Mother Hubbard and Her Dog (1968)
- The Great Blueness and Other Predicaments (1968)
- Small Pig (1969)
- Ice-Cream Cone Coot, and Other Rare Birds (1971)
- On the Day Peter Stuyvesant Sailed Into Town (1971)
- The Man Who Took the Indoors Out (1974)
- Owl at Home (1975)
- How the Rooster Saved the Day (1977), illustrated by Anita Lobel
- Grasshopper on the Road (1978)
- A Treeful of Pigs (1979), illustrated by Anita Lobel
- Fables (1980) (A Caldecott Medal winner)
- Uncle Elephant (1981)
- On Market Street (1981), illustrated by Anita Lobel
- Ming Lo Moves the Mountain (1982)
- The Book of Pigericks: Pig Limericks (1983)
- The Rose in My Garden (1984), illustrated by Anita Lobel
- Whiskers & Rhymes (1985)
- The Turnaround Wind (1988)
- Odd Owls & Stout Pigs: A Book of Nonsense (2009), color by Adrianne Lobel

== Frog and Toad series ==
A series of books featuring Frog and Toad

- Frog and Toad Are Friends (1970)
- Frog and Toad Together (1972)
- Frog and Toad All Year (1976)
- Days with Frog and Toad (1979)
- The Frogs and Toads All Sang (2009), color by Adrianne Lobel

=== Omnibus editions ===
- The Frog and Toad Treasury (1996) includes Frog and Toad are Friends, Frog and Toad Together, and Frog and Toad All Year
- Adventures of Frog and Toad (2005) includes Frog and Toad are Friends, Frog and Toad Together, and Days with Frog and Toad
- Frog and Toad Storybook Treasury (2013) includes all four original books
- Frog and Toad: The Complete Collection (2016) includes all four original books

== Mouse series ==
- Mouse Tales (1972)
- Mouse Soup (1977) (Garden State Children's Book Award winner)

== As illustrator only ==
- Happy Times with Holiday Rhymes (1958) by Tamar Grand, a coloring and activity book about Jewish holidays
- My First Book of Prayers (1958) by Edythe Scharfstein, Sol Scharfstein, Ezekiel Schloss
- The Book of Chanukah Poems, Riddles, Stories, Songs, Things to Do (1959) by Edythe Scharfstein and Ezekial Schloss
- The Complete Book of Hanukkah (1959) by Kinneret Chiel
- Holidays are Nice: Around the Year with the Jewish Child (1960) by Robert Garvey and Ezekiel Schloss
- Red Tag Comes Back (1961) by Fred Phleger
- Something Old Something New (1961) by Susan Rhinehart
- Let's Be Indians (1962) by Peggy Parish
- Little Runner of the Longhouse (1962) by Betty Baker
- The Secret Three (1963) by Mildred Myrick
- The Quarreling Book (1963) by Charlotte Zolotow
- Terry and the Caterpillars (1963) by Millicent E. Selsam
- Greg's Microscope (1963) by Millicent E. Selsam
- Let's Be Early Settlers with Daniel Boone (1963) by Peggy Parish
- Miss Suzy (1964) by Miriam Young
- Red Fox and His Canoe (1964) by Nathaniel Benchley
- Dudley Pippin (1965) by Phil Ressner
- Let's Get Turtles (1965) by Millicent E. Selsam
- Someday (1965) by Charlotte Zolotow
- The Witch on the Corner (1966) by Felice Holman
- Oscar Otter (1966) by Nathaniel Benchley
- Benny's Animals and How He Put Them in Order (1966) by Millicent E. Selsam
- The Strange Disappearance of Arthur Cluck (1967) by Nathaniel Benchley
- The Star Thief (1968) by Andrea DiNoto
- Ants Are Fun (1968) by Mildred Myrick
- I'll Fix Anthony (1969) by Judith Viorst
- Sam the Minuteman (1969) by Nathaniel Benchley
- The Terrible Tiger (1970) by Jack Prelutsky
- Hildilid's Night (1971) by Cheli Duran Ryan
- Hansel and Gretel (1971) by The Brothers Grimm
- The Master of Miracle: A New Novel of the Golem (1971) by Sulamith Ish-Kishor
- Miss Suzy's Easter Surprise (1972) by Miriam Young
- Seahorse (1972) by Robert A. Morris
- Tot Botot and His Little Flute (1972) by Laura Cathon
- As I Was Crossing Boston Common (1973) by Norma Farber
- Good Ethan (1973) by Paula Fox
- Dinosaur Time (1974) by Peggy Parish
- The Clay Pot Boy (1974) by Cynthia Jameson
- Miss Suzy's Birthday (1974) by Miriam Young
- Circus (1974) by Jack Prelutsky
- Nightmares: Poems to Trouble Your Sleep (1976) by Jack Prelutsky
- Merry Merry Fibruary (1977) by Doris Orgel
- Gregory Griggs and Other Nursery Rhyme People (1978)
- The Mean Old Hyena (1978) by Jack Prelutsky
- Right as Right Can Be (1978) by Anne Rose
- Tales of Oliver Pig (1979) by Jean Van Leeuwen
- The Tale of Meshka the Kvetch (1980) by Carol Chapman
- The Headless Horseman Rides Tonight: More Poems to Trouble Your Sleep (1980) by Jack Prelutsky
- More Tales of Oliver Pig (1981) by Jean Van Leeuwen
- The Random House Book of Poetry for Children (1983) by Jack Prelutsky
- A Three Hat Day (1985) by Laura Geringer
- The Random House Book of Mother Goose (1986)
- Bear Gets Dressed (1986) by Harriet Ziefert
- Bear's Busy Morning (1986) by Harriet Ziefert
- Bear Goes Shopping (1986) by Harriet Ziefert
- Bear All Year (1986) by Harriet Ziefert
- The Devil and Mother Crump (1987) by Valerie School Carey
- Where's the Turtle? (1987) by Harriet Ziefert
- Sing a Song of Popcorn: Every Child's Book of Poems (1988) by Beatrice Schenk de Regniers
- Tyrannousaurus Was a Beast: Dinosaur Poems (1988) by Jack Prelutsky

=== Written by Lilian Moore ===
Books that Arnold Lobel illustrated for Lilian Moore:

- The Magic Spectacles and Other Easy-to-Read Stories (1965)
- Junk Day on Juniper Street and Other Easy-to-Read Stories (1969)

=== Written by Edward Lear ===
Books that Arnold Lobel illustrated for Edward Lear:

- The Four Little Children Who Went Around the World (1968)
- The New Vestments (1970)
