= Long Ago and Far Away (TV series) =

Television series

An opening screenshot from Long Ago and Far Away

Long Ago and Far Away is an American children's live-action/animated television series that aired on PBS Television from January 28, 1989 to December 5, 1992. It was created by WGBH, a public television broadcast service located in Boston, Massachusetts. WGBH is a member of PBS, which allowed for the series to be viewed on various other PBS stations.

After the last episode aired, the show went into reruns until September 4, 1994.

== Premise ==
Each episode began with host James Earl Jones sitting in a chair in a room with a table, lamp, and window. The walls were blue with white dots in order to make it appear as if the room was sitting out in space or the night sky.

James Earl Jones talks during the short opening section, then acts as narrator for the balance of an episode. The series presents stories based on traditional folk and fairy tales. A number of presentation methods were used to tell these stories, with stop motion animation, live action or traditional animation being used depending on the episode.

James Earl Jones only hosts in seasons one and two. Long Ago and Far Away also featured a number of guest narrators, including Tammy Grimes (who narrated "The Happy Circus"); Kim Loughran (who narrated "Bill and Bunny"); David Suchet (who narrated "The Fool of the World and the Flying Ship"); Mia Farrow (who narrated "Beauty and the Beast" and "Pegasus"); Peter Chelsom (who narrated Bill the Minder), Robert Hardy (who narrated "Pied Piper of Hamelin"); and Kevin Kline (who narrated "Merlin and the Dragons"). In the episode "Emperor's New Clothes", Regis Philbin provided the voice of the Emperor; in "The Wind in the Willows" David Jason provided the voice of Mr. Toad; and in "The Reluctant Dragon" Simon Callow provided the voice of the dragon.

== Awards ==
- National Education Association Award, Advancement of Learning through Broadcasting
- Action for Children's Television, Achievement in Children's Television Award
- National Catholic Association of Broadcasters and Communicators, Gabriel Award, Best National Children's Program
- International Film and Television Festival of New York, Gold Medal
- Connoisseur Magazine, Connie Award, Best National Children's Series
- International Reading Association, Broadcast Media Award

== Episodes ==
=== Season 1 (1989) ===
- The Pied Piper of Hamelin (January 28, 1989)
- The Reluctant Dragon (February 4, 1989)
- Abel's Island (February 11, 1989)
- The Happy Circus (February 18, 1989)
- Hungarian Folk tales (February 25, 1989)
- The Talking Parcel (March 4, 1989)
- The Talking Parcel (March 11, 1989)
- The Wind in the Willows (March 18, 1989)
- Svyatogor (March 25, 1989)
- The Sleeping Princess (April 1, 1989)
- As Long As He Can Count the Cows (April 8, 1989)
- The Man Who Planted Trees (April 15, 1989)
- The Silver Cornet (April 22, 1989)
- Bill and Bunny (April 29, 1989)
- Frog and Toad Are Friends (May 6, 1989)
- Frog and Toad Together (May 13, 1989)

=== Season 2 (1990) ===
- Beauty and the Beast (September 8, 1990)
- Noah's Ark (September 15, 1990)
- Rarg (September 22, 1990)
- Circus Dreams (September 29, 1990)
- More Hungarian Folktales (October 6, 1990)
- The Boy in the Oak Tree (October 13, 1990)
- Oh, Mr. Toad! Part 1 (October 20, 1990)
- Oh, Mr. Toad! Part 2 (October 27, 1990)
- Bill the Minder (November 3, 1990)

=== Season 3 (1991) ===
- The Fool of the World and the Flying Ship (October 5, 1991)
- The Fool of the World and the Flying Ship (October 12, 1991)
- The Emperor's New Clothes (October 19, 1991)
- Uncle Elephant (October 26, 1991)
- Jazztime Tale (November 2, 1991)
- Merlin and the Dragons (November 9, 1991)
- Pegasus the Flying Horse (November 16, 1991)

=== Season 4 (1992) ===
- Nightengale (November 21, 1992)
- Mouse Soup (November 28, 1992)
- The Talking Eggs (December 5, 1992)
