= Minnie and Moo: The Attack of the Easter Bunnies =

Children's picture book in the Minnie and Moo series written by Denys Cazet

- Author: Denys Cazet
- Illustrator: Denys Cazet
- Series: Minnie and Moo
- Genre: Children's Literature
- Publisher: HarperCollins
- Publication date: 2004
- ISBN: 9780060005085

Minnie and Moo: The Attack of the Easter Bunnies is a children's picture book in the Minnie and Moo series and is written and illustrated by Denys Cazet.

== Plot ==
Minnie hears the farmer saying that he is too old to be the Easter Bunny. The cows try to find a substitute because the grandchildren are expecting an egg hunt. When all the animals turn them down, the job goes to Minnie and Moo, but the other animals soon join them.

== Reception ==
School Library Journal's Marilyn Taniguchi reviewed the book saying, "Cazet's springlike pastels and comically cartoony figures illuminate the fun goings-on, but it's the silly dialogue that carries the day. Cazet's lovably offbeat characters follow in the "hoof" steps of Bernard Wiseman's Morris the Moose and James Marshall's Fox."

A Kirkus Reviews review wrote, "Cazet's cockeyed good cheer is in fine form here--a simple pleasure of verbal dexterity--as is his art: Elvis the chicken's costume--bedraggled rabbit ears crowning his scrawny head--is worth framing."

Carolyn Phelan of Booklist called the book "funny" and "treat for independent readers," specifically noted that it is a great read-aloud for preschoolers at Easter."
