= Mae D. Huettig =

American economist

Mae Dena Huettig (born July 18, 1911 in Michigan; died February 8, 1996) was an American economist, who wrote Economic Control of the Motion Picture Industry: A Study in Industrial Organization (1944), the first book to analyze Hollywood's system of oligopolistic control.

== Early life ==
Mae Dena Huettig was born Emma Dena Solomon, in Michigan, on July 18, 1911. Huettig moved from Michigan to Los Angeles as a child. She attended the University of California Los Angeles and graduated in 1931 at the age of nineteen. Huettig received a Bachelor of Arts in economics from UCLA and went on to pursue a graduate degree at the University of Pennsylvania's Wharton School from 1930 to 1932, where she studied industrial economics at the Industrial Research Unit under the supervision of Dr. Anne Bezanson.

== Career ==
During 1933–1939, Huettig worked for the Twentieth Century Fund. She then worked on the Motion Picture Research Project, funded by the Rockefeller Foundation. Her work in Hollywood influenced her decision to write a dissertation on the history and industrial development of the American motion picture business.

In 1941, she completed her dissertation. Her research was used to analyze the industrial relationships that regulated the film industry and as part of the Paramount Case provided data for litigation that forced studios to divest themselves of theater chains.

After graduation, Huettig worked as president of Diamonds Production, Inc. located in New York City before returning to Southern California. According to her daughter, filmmaker Joan Churchill, Huettig "was an activist who was named by the Senate McClellan committee as one of the 10 most subversive people in the country. She was considered a Commie and was harassed by HUAC. We had to move to Ojai, a valley directly east of Santa Barbara, when I was 11. We basically got run out of town." After the Watts uprising in 1965, Huettig became involved in political activism, focusing on police violence and voting abuses, researching and providing information to train young people to recognize and report discriminatory behavior by the police or other public agencies. Huettig also worked on campaigns to desegregate Pasadena Public Schools and to disband the LAPD's Public Disorder and Intelligence Division.

== Personal life ==
In 1944, she returned to Southern California, where she divorced Lester Huettig. With her second husband, Robert Churchill, founder of Churchill Films (which produced educational films), she had two children, Joan and Jim.
