= Anita Lobel =

Polish-American children's illustrator

- Born: Anita Kempler; June 2, 1934 (age 92); Kraków, Poland
- Education: Pratt Institute
- Occupation: Illustrator
- Spouse: Arnold Lobel (m. 1955; died 1987)
- Children: 2, including Adrianne Lobel
- Writing career
- Genre: Children's picture books
- Notable works: On Market Street; A New Coat for Anna; Alison's Zinnia; No Pretty Pictures (memoir)
- Website: anita-lobel.com

Anita Lobel (née Kempler; born June 2, 1934) is a Poland-born American illustrator of children's books, including On Market Street, written by her husband Arnold Lobel and a Caldecott Honor Book for illustration, A New Coat for Anna, Alison's Zinnia, and This Quiet Lady. One Lighthouse, One Moon, one of three books she created about her cat, Nini, is a New York Times Best Illustrated Book. Her childhood memoir, No Pretty Pictures, was a finalist for the National Book Award.

== Biography ==
She was born in Kraków, Poland, to a Jewish merchant family. When she was five years old, World War II began and she, her brother and their nanny, whom they called Niania, were forced into hiding for the next four and a half years, first in the countryside, then in a ghetto, and finally in a convent, where the Nazis caught them. She and her brother were then sent to a concentration camp in Germany. They were rescued in 1945 by the Swedish Red Cross and reunited with their parents in 1947. Though she could read and write, Lobel did not begin school until age 13. In 1952, her family moved from Sweden to New York City where she graduated from Washington Irving High School and earned a B.F.A. in fine arts from Pratt Institute. While taking part in a school play at Pratt, she met her future husband, Arnold Lobel, who was the play's director.

After graduation, she worked for several years as a textile designer until Susan Hirschman asked her to make a book. Published in 1965, Sven's Bridge was the first book she wrote and illustrated. The illustrations include examples of Swedish folk designs from the author's childhood. Her third book, Potatoes, Potatoes, is based partly on her childhood in Poland, and her fourth book, The Troll Music, "was mainly inspired by the bottom parts of medieval tapestries with all the vegetation and little animals running around."

For many years, she worked with her husband, writer-illustrator Arnold Lobel. They had two children – daughter Adrianne and son Adam – and three grandchildren. Their first and second collaborations were How the Rooster Saved the Day and A Treeful of Pigs. She received a Caldecott Honor in 1982 for another, On Market Street.

After her husband's death in 1987, she went on to write and illustrate Alison's Zinnia and Away from Home, a companion piece focusing on boys rather than girls. In 1998, she produced No Pretty Pictures, which is a memoir of her childhood. The story begins in 1939, when she was five years old, and continues through 1947, when she and her brother were reunited with their parents. After that, she illustrated a counting book, One Lighthouse, One Moon. Throughout this time, she has illustrated works of other authors, including Charlotte S. Huck and Kevin Henkes.

== Awards ==
The memoir No Pretty Pictures was one of five finalists for the 1998 National Book Award for Young People's Literature. It won a Judy Lopez Memorial Medal for Children's Literature, an Orbis Pictus Award, a Golden Kite Award, a Sydney Taylor Award Honor Book, a Booklist editor's choice, a River Bank Review Children's Books of Distinction finalist, an American Library Association Best Books for Young Adults citation, and a Gradiva Award for Best Memoir.

Two picture books created by Arnold and Anita Lobel were Boston Globe–Horn Book Award runners-up (one of three Honor Books in each case): On Market Street in 1981 and The Rose in My Garden in 1984. On Market Street was also a finalist for the Caldecott Medal (children's picture book illustration, Anita Lobel) and National Book Award (hardcover picture books, both authors).

Anita Lobel has received three Best Illustrated Book selections from The New York Times Book Review, in 1965 for Sven's Bridge, in 1981 for On Market Street, and in 2000 for One Lighthouse, One Moon. How the Rooster Saved the Day is a New York Times Outstanding Book selection for 1977.

== Published books ==
As writer only

- No Pretty Pictures: A Child of War (Greenwillow Books, 1998; ISBN 0688159354) – "The author, known as an illustrator of children's books, describes her experiences as a Polish Jew during World War II and for years in Sweden afterwards.", OCLC 38061586

As illustrator

- Sven's Bridge, 1965.
- Cock-a-Doodle Doo! Cock-a-Doodle Dandy!: A New Songbook for the Newest Singers (1966), Paul Kapp – "for piano, with words and added chord symbols", OCLC 1409658
- The Troll Music, 1966.
- Puppy Summer (1966), written by Meindert DeJong.
- The Wishing Penny and Other Stories (1967), anthology
- Potatoes, Potatoes, 1967.
- The Wisest Man in the World: A Legend of Ancient Israel (1968), Benjamin Elkin.
- The Little Wooden Farmer (1968), Alice Dalgliesh.
- Indian Summer (1968), F. N. Monjo
- Someone Small (1969), Barbara Borack
- Under a Mushroom, 1970.
- Three Rolls and One Doughnut: Fables from Russia (1970), retold by Mirra Ginsburg
- The Uproar (1970), Doris Orgel
- The Seamstress of Salzburg, 1970.
- How the Tsar Drinks Tea (1971), Benjamin Elkin.
- One for the Price of Two (1972), Cynthia Jameson
- Soldier, Soldier, Won't You Marry Me? (1972), compiled by John Langstaff.
- Little John (1972), Theodor Storm, retold by Doris Orgel
- A Birthday for the Princess, 1973.
- Clever Kate (1973), Brothers Grimm, adapted by Elizabeth Shub
- Christmas Crafts: Things to Make the 24 Days Before Christmas (1974), Carolyn Meyer
- King Rooster, Queen Hen (1975), retold.
- Peter Penny's Dance (1976), Janet Quin-Harkin.
- Fanny's Sister (1980), Penelope Lively
- How the Rooster Saved the Day (1977), Arnold Lobel
- The Pancake (1978), retold
- The Dwarf Giant, 1991.
- A Treeful of Pigs (1979), Arnold Lobel
- On Market Street (1981), Arnold Lobel – "A child buys presents from A to Z in the shops along Market Street."; Caldecott Honor Book, OCLC 6666069
- Singing Bee!: A Collection of Favorite Children's Songs (1982), anthology – later issued as Sing a Song of Sixpence! The Best Song Book Ever
- The Straw Maid (1983), adapted
- Once: A Lullaby (1986), B. P. Nichol
- The Rose in My Garden (1984), Arnold Lobel
- The Night Before Christmas (1984), Clement Clarke Moore [1823]
- A New Coat for Anna (1986), Harriet Ziefert
- Princess Furball (1989), retold by Charlotte Huck
- Looking for Daniela: A Romantic Adventure (1988), Steven Kroll
- Alison's Zinnia, 1990.
- Sulla strada del mercato (Milan: Emme, 1990), Nico Orengo – verse adaptation of On Market Street, LCCN 91-179602
- This Quiet Lady (1992), Charlotte Zolotow
- Pierrot's ABC Garden, 1992.
- Away from Home, 1994.
- The Cat and the Cook and Other Fables of Krylov (1995), Ivan Krylov, retold by Ethel L. Heins
- Toads and Diamonds (1995), retold by Charlotte Huck
- Not Everyday an Aurora Borealis for Your Birthday: A Love Poem (1998), Carl Sandburg
- Mangaboom (1997) Charlotte Pomerantz
- My Day in the Garden (1999), Miela Ford
- One Lighthouse, One Moon, 2000.
- The Stable Rat and Other Christmas Poems (2001), Julia Cunningham
- The Black Bull of Norroway: A Scottish Tale (2001), retold by Charlotte Huck
- All the World's a Stage (2003), Rebecca Piatt Davidson
- My Grandmother's Stories: A Collection of Jewish Folk Tales (2003), Adèle Geras
- So Happy! (2005), Kevin Henkes
- Animal Antics: A to Z, 2005.
- Nini Here and There, 2007
- Hello, Day!, 2008
- Nini Lost and Found, 2010
- 10 Hungry Rabbits: Counting and Coloring Concepts, 2012
- Lena's Sleep Sheep: A Going-to-Bed Book, 2013
- Taking Care of Mama Rabbit, 2014
- Playful Pigs from A to Z, 2015, LCCN 2014-33874
- Ducks on the Road: A Counting Adventure, 2021
- Good Morning, Good Night, 2023
