= Churchill Films =

Film production company

SVE & Churchill Media
- Formerly: Churchill Wexler Film Productions (1948–1961)
- Type: Private
- Industry: 16mm Films
- Founded: 1948; 78 years ago
- Founders: Robert Churchill; Sy Wexler
- Defunct: 1996; 30 years ago
- Fate: Folded into Discovery
- Successor: Discovery Education

Churchill Films, also called Churchill Media, was an American Film producer and distributor of direct-to-video/educational films founded by Robert Churchill (1911-1997) and Sy Wexler (1916–2005) in 1948 as Churchill Wexler Film Productions. They have produced The Mouse and the Motorcycle (1986) based on the 1965 book by Beverly Cleary and many other award-winning children's films.

Churchill Films was acquired by American Educational Products in 1994. The Churchill Films catalog is now part of Discovery Education.

In December 2009, The Jungle (1967), a film distributed by Churchill Films in 16mm for the educational film market, was named to the National Film Registry.

== History ==
=== Origins ===
Churchill Films was Founded in 1948, by Robert Churchill and Sy Wexler. Churchill was a Harvard law graduate and former fashion photographer who pivoted to cinematography during World War II, making training films for the U.S. Army Signal Corps.

The studio originally launched under the name Churchill Wexler Film Productions when Both Churchill and Wexler met

Operating out of Los Angeles, California, the duo produced their first educational short, Wonders in Your Own Backyard, in 1948 on a budget of $836 ($11,583 adjusted for inflation)

In 1961, the partnership dissolved, and the company was officially rebranded as Churchill Films.

== Buyouts ==
In 1994, co-founder Robert Churchill sold the company to American Educational Products.

In 1996, Churchill Media was integrated under AMEP and was merged into another major acquisition to form SVE & Churchill Media, continuing to distribute 16mm films, multimedia, and direct-to-video educational content to schools and libraries.

In 2004, SVE & Churchill Media was merged with another educational media distributor, Clearvue/eav. Following this merger, the "Churchill" name was dropped from the corporate branding, and the new entity operated under the name Clearvue & SVE.

By 2008, Discovery Bought the Combined entity and it was merged into Discovery's Operations between 2008 and 2009.

== Filmography ==
Year	Title	Starring	Director	Producer(s)	Runtime	Notes
1967	The Jungle	Charlie "Brown" Davis, Reginald "Reggie" Ackridge David "Bat" Williams Jimmy "Country" Robinson	Charlie "Brown" Davis, Jimmy "Country" Robinson David "Bat" Williams		22:00	Made under the direction of the Temple University professor Harold Haskins.
1971	Hopscotch	June Foray, Jane Webb, Kimie Calvert, Joan Drake, Barbara Baldwin, Lillian Peel, Faith Peel	Spencer Peel, Alan Zaslove, Robert Churchill	Robert Churchill	12:00	
1975	Sooper Goop	Robert Ridgely, Julie McWhirther Fred Wolf	Charles Swenson	Robert Churchill	13:00 10:00 (1989 short version)	The music is composed by Joseph Byrd who is known as a composer and the leader of the short-lived experimental band The United States of America. It was considered for an Academy Award in 1976, which did not make the cut.
1983	Curious George Goes to the Hospital	Ruth Buell, Corey Burton Bobbie Speidel	John Clark Matthews	Robert Churchill, George McQuilkin	15:15	Based on Curious George Goes to the Hospital (1966) by Margret Rey and H. A. Rey.
1984	Curious George	Corey Burton, June Foray	John Clark Matthews	Robert Churchill, George McQuilkin	14:33	Based on Curious George (1941) by Margret Rey and H. A. Rey.
1985	Frog and Toad Are Friends	Hal Smith, Will Ryan, Jan Colmar	John Clark Matthews	Robert Churchill, George McQuilkin	17:54	Based on Frog and Toad Are Friends (1970) by Arnold Lobel.
1985	Frog and Toad: Behind the Scenes	John Clark Matthews	John Clark Matthews	Robert Churchill, George McQuilkin	9:23	Based on Frog and Toad Are Friends (1985) by Churchill Films
1986 1987 (Home video)	The Mouse and the Motorcycle	Philip Waller, Mimi Kennedy, Ray Walston, Thom Sharp	Ron Underwood	George McQuilkin, John Clark Matthews	40:54	Based on The Mouse and the Motorcycle (1970) by Beverly Cleary
1987	Frog and Toad Together	Hal Smith (Toad), Will Ryan (Frog)	John Clark Matthews	Robert Churchill, George McQuilkin	17:34	Based on Frog and Toad Together (1971, 1972) by Arnold Lobel.
1988	Runaway Ralph	Fred Savage, Conchata Ferrell, Sara Gilbert	Ron Underwood	George McQuilkin, John Clark Matthews	40:11	Based on Runaway Ralph (1970) by Beverly Cleary
1989	Morris Goes to School	Will Ryan, Diane Michelle	John Clark Matthews	George McQuilkin	14:37	Based on Morris Goes to School (1970) by Bernard Wiseman.
1989	Stanley and the Dinosaurs	Will Ryan, Jim Cummings, Corey Burton	John Clark Matthews	George McQuilkin	15:42	Based on Stanley (1962) by Syd Hoff.
1990	Ralph S. Mouse	Robert Oliveri, Britt Leach, Lou Cutell	Thomas G. Smith	George McQuilkin, John Clark Matthews	41:35	Based on Ralph S. Mouse (1982) by Beverly Cleary
1991	Uncle Elephant	Will Ryan, Pat Musick, June Foray, Corey Burton	John Clark Matthews	John Clark Matthews	25:53	Based on Uncle Elephant (1981) by Arnold Lobel. Made with WGBH Educational Foundation
1992	Mouse Soup	Buddy Hackett, Will Ryan, Hal Rayle, Pat Musick, Dawnn Lewis	John Clark Matthews	John Clark Matthews	25:48	Based on Mouse Soup (1977) by Arnold Lobel.
1993	Commander Toad in Space	Cory Miller, James Murray Bruce Lanoil Mark Hamill Nichelle Nichols Mary McDonald Lewis	John Clark Matthews	John Clark Matthews	23:21	Based on Commander Toad in Space (1980) by Jane Yolen Made for the ABC Weekend Specials TV show
1993	Morris Has a Cold	Will Ryan, Hal Smith, Pat Musick	John Clark Matthews	John Clark Matthews	13:39	Based on Morris Has a Cold (1978) by Bernard Wiseman
