= Frog and Toad =

Books by Arnold Lobel

- Front cover of the first book with seal affixed: Caldecott Honor Book (1971)
- Author: Arnold Lobel (also illustrator)
- Country: United States
- Genre: Children's picture book, short story collection
- Publisher: Harper & Row
- Published: 1970–1979
- No. of books: 4

Frog and Toad is a series of easy-reader children's books, written and illustrated by American author Arnold Lobel.

Each book contains five simple, often humorous short stories chronicling the exploits of an anthropomorphic frog and toad. The situations in which they find themselves are a cross between the human and animal worlds. Some of their adventures include attempting to fly a kite, cleaning Toad's dirty house, and finding out different reasons for isolation.

== Characters ==
- Frog is taller with a green shade and is more cheery and relaxed than Toad.
- Toad is shorter and stout with a brown shade and, while just as caring and friendly as Frog, is also the more serious and uptight of the duo.

== Origins ==
When Lobel was sick and out of school for much of second grade, he kept himself busy by drawing. He used his animal drawings as a way of coping with the social insecurity of his return and to make friends. His books about animal friends, such as Frog and Toad, were drawn from these experiences. Lobel himself wrote, "Frog and Toad are really two aspects of myself". In The New Yorker, his daughter Adrianne Lobel suggested "that there's another dimension to the series' sustained popularity. Frog and Toad are of the same sex, and they love each other". Lobel was a closeted gay man for much of his life; he came out to family four years following the publication of the first book of the series.

== Books ==
- Frog and Toad Are Friends (1970), LCCN 73-105492
- Frog and Toad Together (1972), LCCN 73-183163
- Frog and Toad All Year (1976), LCCN 76-2343
- Days With Frog and Toad (1979), LCCN 78-21786

=== Omnibus editions ===
- The Frog and Toad Treasury (1996), ISBN 0060267887
  includes Frog and Toad are Friends, Frog and Toad Together, and Frog and Toad All Year
- Adventures of Frog and Toad (2005), ISBN 0760771049
  includes Frog and Toad are Friends, Frog and Toad Together, and Days with Frog and Toad
- Frog and Toad Storybook Treasury (2013), ISBN 0062292587
  includes all four original books
- Frog and Toad: The Complete Collection (2016) ISBN 000813622X
  includes all four original books

=== Later releases ===
In 2008, three of Arnold Lobel's uncolored, unpublished Frog and Toad books were discovered in an estate sale. They were consolidated into two books and colored by Lobel's daughter Adrianne Lobel. They are written, illustrated, and delivered in a manner different from the original four books.

- The Frogs and Toads All Sang (2009), color by Adrianne Lobel, LCCN 2008-51768
- Odd Owls and Stout Pigs: A Book of Nonsense (2009), color by Adrianne Lobel, LCCN 2009-1406

== Reception ==
Frog and Toad is valued by experts in children's literature for its portrayal of the value of friendship.

Frog and Toad are Friends was a Caldecott Honor Book, or runner-up for the annual American Library Association (ALA) Caldecott Medal, which recognizes children's picture book illustration. In 2012, it was ranked number 15 among the "Top 100 Picture Books" in a survey published by School Library Journal.

Frog and Toad Together was a Newbery Honor Book, which recognizes children's literature.

Frog and Toad All Year won a Christopher Award in 1977 – one of five, at a time when books for young people was the only award category. The awards recognize "media that 'affirm the highest values of the human spirit' ... Award winners encourage audiences to see the better side of human nature and motivate artists and the general public to use their best instincts on behalf of others".

In 2023, Frog and Toad was repopularized as part of the cottagecore trend.

== Adaptations ==
In the 1980s, Churchill Films produced 18-minute adaptations of the first two books using clay animation. Both films were directed by John Clark Matthews, credited also as theme music composer and one principal animator. Frog and Toad were voiced by Will Ryan and Hal Smith respectively. Only Frog and Toad Are Friends was narrated by Lobel. Frog and Toad Are Friends was released on May 23, 1985, while Frog and Toad Together was released on September 3, 1987. They were distributed to the home market only (direct-to-video).

The Frog and Toad books inspired a Broadway musical, A Year with Frog and Toad. The musical was commissioned by Lobel's daughter, Adrianne Lobel, played off-Broadway, and ran briefly on Broadway in 2003. It was nominated for three Tony Awards. Prior to this, the books had inspired a non-musical play, "Frog and Toad (Forever)", written by Y York, and performed at Seattle Children's Theatre in 1998 and First Stage Children's Theater in Milwaukee in 1999.

An animated series based on the books premiered on Apple TV on April 28, 2023. It stars Nat Faxon as Frog and Kevin Michael Richardson as Toad. It also features Ron Funches, Fortune Feimster, Yvette Nicole Brown, Margaret Cho, Cole Escola, Tom Kenny and Aparna Nancherla. The show was developed by Rob Hoegee with Sarah Johnson as the Supervising Director. A Christmas special was released on December 1, 2023. The second season was released on May 31, 2024.
