= Minnie and Moo: The Night of the Living Bed =

2003 children's picture book by Denys Cazet

The Night of the Living Bed
- Author: Denys Cazet
- Cover artist: Cazet
- Language: English
- Series: Minnie and Moo
- Genre: Children's books, Halloween, Comedy
- Publisher: HarperCollins
- Publication date: August 5th 2003
- Media type: Print

Minnie and Moo: The Night of the Living Bed is a 2003 children's picture book from the Minnie and Moo series and is written by Denys Cazet.

== Plot ==
After having a nightmare about a giant mouse eating the last piece of chocolate in the world, Minnie grabs Moo and the two cows fall out of the bed which causes the bed to start rolling away. They run after it and then they jump on, grabbing other animals on the way down a hill. When they finally come to a stop in town, Moo realizes it is Halloween night. The animals do many tricks so they can get chocolate. When Minnie returns home, the cow is contented and ready to sleep.

== Reception ==
Anne Knickerbocker, of School Library Journal, reviewed the book saying, " Humorous color illustrations accompany the text, helping to make this holiday book a delight to read any day of the year." A Kirkus Reviews review says, "When the sheep accidentally get wet, a woman tries to identify the crew at her Halloween door: "Don't tell me!" she said. "I know! Sponges! Four cows, a pig, and two walking sponges! You children are so clever." Clever and hilarious". Stephanie Zvirin, of Booklist, reviewed the book saying, "This isn’t quite as funny or as strongly plotted as some of the duo’s previous books in the I Can Read series, but there are still some funny exchanges that new readers will easily pick up on. Large type and lots of art that breaks up the words will help as well."
