= Minnie and Moo: Will You Be My Valentine? =

Book by Denys Cazet

- Author: Denys Cazet
- Illustrator: Cazet
- Series: Minnie and Moo
- Published: 2003
- Publisher: HarperCollins
- Media type: Children’s Picture book
- Preceded by: Minnie and Moo Meet Frankenswine
- Followed by: Minnie and Moo Go To The Moon

Minnie and Moo: Will You Be My Valentine? is a children's picture book from the Minnie and Moo series by Denys Cazet, first published in 2003.

== Plot ==
Moo decides to create "love poems for the needy". So Minnie and Moo dress up as cupids. The cows have just the right outfits in the barn. Dressed up as cupids, they use Moo's poems to bring love to the barnyard. The poems do not always end up in the right hands, claws, or hooves. Farmer John thinks that the cows were the ones sending the poetry. His wife replied that cows can't write.

== Reception ==
Elaine Lesh Morgan, of School Library Journal, reviewed the book saying, " Chock-full of humorous verses and silly illustrations, this title is sure to be a hit with newly independent readers". A Kirkus Reviews review says, "The farmer's wife takes her shot: "Cows don't write poems," she tells her husband. Young readers will know better, especially if they have read Click, Clack, Moo. Keep 'em moooving, Minnie and Moo". Betty Carter, of Horn Book Magazine, reviewed the book saying, "Outrageous and silly, this series insists on taking nothing seriously, except the unobtrusive aids (simplified vocabulary; spot on, zany illustrations; clever language; and a fast-moving plot) it provides beginning readers".
