= The Perfect Pumpkin Pie =

2005 children's picture book by Denys Cazet

- Author: Denys Cazet
- Language: English
- Subject: Halloween
- Genre: Children's picture book
- Published: 2005
- Publisher: HarperCollins
- Publication place: United States

The Perfect Pumpkin Pie is a 2005 children's picture book by Denys Cazet, creator of the Minnie and Moo series.

== Plot ==
On Halloween, Mrs. Wilkerson bakes a perfect pie for her grouchy husband and reminds him that when they die, there will be no pie. After she said that, her husband yells that he isn't going then. Soon after, he falls dead into his pumpkin pie. The widow buries him in the yard and moves away. Jack and his grandmother move in, and they bake a pie. The husband returns as a ghost to eat some pumpkin pie. He rejects the first, but he eats the third one and then goes underground. He comes back above the ground when he smells apple pie.

== Reception ==
A Publishers Weekly review says, "He rejects the first, but three's the charm, and the fellow goes back underground--until an apple pie scent wafts his way. Playful type and a mix of full-spread compositions and silhouette sequences keep a brisk pace. Youngsters will happily join in the ghost's refrain." A Kirkus Reviews review says, "No recipe, but still a mouthwatering crowd-pleaser, at Halloween or any other time." Gillian Engburg, of Booklist, reviewed the book saying, "A few sensitive kids may find Wilkerson's abrupt death upsetting, but most will delight in this rollicking, sometimes gruesome Halloween story."
