= Morris Goes to School =

- Directed by: John Clark Matthews
- Screenplay by: John Clark Matthews
- Based on: "Morris Goes to School" by Bernard Wiseman
- Produced by: George McQuilkin
- Starring: Will Ryan; Diane Michelle
- Music by: Steve Kohn
- Production company: Churchill Films
- Release date: April 13, 1989
- Running time: 14 minutes 37 seconds
- Country: United States
- Language: English

Morris Goes to School is a short stop-motion animated children's film released in 1989. It is based on the children's picture book of the same name written and illustrated by B. Wiseman, and was produced by Churchill Films. In 1993, the company created another short film based on Morris the Moose called Morris Has a Cold.

== Plot ==
Morris the moose is happily strolling through the countryside, when he finds a penny, and stashes it with his others. He decides to head into town and buy something.

He mistakenly enters a fish market ("It's Mel's Fish"), and asks the cashier for candy. The cashier explains that it is a fish market, and discovers that Morris can't read, and points him to the candy store.

At the candy store, the candyman discovers that Morris can only count to four. After helping him with getting candy, he takes Morris to the local school (Wiseman Elementary School).

The candyman introduces Morris to the teacher, Miss Fine (who is first seen reading "Spring" from Frog and Toad Are Friends to her students), and Morris takes a seat with the rest of the students. While learning the alphabet, the letter B reminds Morris of a stinging bee. The letter C then reminds Morris of how much he loves the sea. Miss Fine tells him not to interrupt again and that he needs to raise his hand (of his hoof in his case) when he wishes to speak. Morris then has to go to the bathroom, but accidentally goes into the girls' bathroom, since he can't read.

Later on, while spelling words, Morris is upset that they didn't spell "moose". Miss Fine asks if any of her students can spell "moose". Some of them spell it wrong, so Miss Fine spells "moose" the right way.

It is then time for lunch, and recess. Morris plays ball and jumps rope with the other students. Next it's time for art, and the students are fingerpainting. During art, Miss Fine explains the grammar of the phrase "this is fun".

Next it's time to count. Miss Fine shows Morris that he can count all the way to 12 using his antlers. Then it's music time and they all sing a song called "Feed Your Brain". After that, they play "make-believe".

When school is over, Morris decides to celebrate his first day by buying gumdrops from the candy store, this time doing all the reading and counting himself. Morris tells the candyman about everything he learned at school that day, including some he didn't know.

== Voice cast ==
The following information is directly from the credits of the film.

- Will Ryan as Morris, the Fish store clerk, the Candy store clerk
- Diane Michelle as Miss Fine
- Cindy Hahn, Jimmy Guardino, Renee Roman, Kari Doyle, Ryan Polisky, Nigel Matthews, and Nathan Matthews as the children.

== Crew ==
Most of the following information is directly from the credits of the film.

- John Clark Matthews - Writer, Director, Producer, Songwriter, Production Designer, Character Sculpture
- George McQuilkin - Executive Producer
- Steve Kohn – Music Composition
- Will Ryan – Songwriter
- Escott O. Norton – Production Designer, Model & Set Construction, Lighting Setups
- Justin Kohn - Animation, Armature
- Joel Fletcher – Animation, Character Sculpture
- Gail Vandermerwe - Animation
- Jeremy Bishop - Model & Set Construction
- George Wong - Model & Set Construction
- Doug Beswick – Armature
- Peter Marinello – Armature
- Anthony Scott – Graphic Animation
- Niki Matthews – Puppet Construction
- Steve Koch – Character Sculpture

== Awards ==
- C.I.N.E. Golden Eagle
- First Prize - Chicago International Festival of Children's Films
- Gold Award - Parent's Choice
- Gold Medal - International Film & TV Festival of New York
- Booklist Non-Print Editor's Choice
- Four Stars - ABC - CLIO Video Rating Guide for Libraries
- Second Prize - Los Angeles International Animation Celebration
- U.S. News & World Report Critic's Choice
- Birmingham International Educational Film Festival - ACE Nominee - Best Children's Show
