= Ralph S. Mouse =

1982 novel by Beverly Cleary

- First edition
- Author: Beverly Cleary
- Illustrator: Paul O. Zelinsky
- Cover artist: Paul O. Zelinsky
- Language: English
- Series: The Mouse and the Motorcycle
- Genre: Children's novel
- Publisher: William Morrow
- Publication date: 1982
- Publication place: United States
- Media type: Print (hardcover and paperback)
- Pages: 139 pp
- ISBN: 0-241-10883-7
- OCLC: 16592488
- Preceded by: Runaway Ralph

Ralph S. Mouse is the third in a children's novel trilogy that was written by Beverly Cleary. It features Ralph, a mouse with the ability to speak, but only with certain people who tend to be loners. It was first published in 1982, illustrated by Paul O. Zelinsky.

A film adaptation was broadcast in the ABC Weekend Special series in 1991.

== Plot ==
Ralph, now an adult, still lives at the Mountain View Inn, a fading ski resort near Cucaracha, California. Ralph spends his days hiding under the grandfather clock and waiting for nighttime, when he can race through the halls on his motorcycle. However, Ralph's motorcycle is showing signs of overuse. His relatives beg him to give them rides on his motorcycle, but their constant demands annoy him.

Ralph has befriended a young boy named Ryan, the son of housekeeper Mrs. Bramble. As they watch a car stunt show, Ryan says he has a classmate named Brad who races motorcycles, and Ralph thinks he might like to meet him. Matt, the inn's custodian, can also communicate with Ralph, and he helps him and his other indoor relatives evade the inn's owner, Mr. Minch. One night after a snowstorm, guests arrive and leave melted snow puddles in the lobby. Ralph races through them, excited by the crests of water, but his relatives soon overtake him and beg for rides. Matt helps shoo away the throng, but they leave behind their droppings. The next morning, Minch scolds Matt for not doing his job and threatens to fire him if he does not eradicate all the mice in the inn. Ralph feels terrible for causing Matt stress and feels he must leave the inn. Ralph begs Ryan to take him and his motorcycle to school and hitches a ride in Ryan's pocket.

Ryan presents Ralph to his classmates; his teacher, Miss K, suggests that the class will research mice and conduct a Mice Exhibit, which will conclude with Ralph running a maze to demonstrate his intelligence. Ralph despises being put on display and feels anxious about running the maze. He begs Ryan to help him, but Ryan wants his classmates to be impressed by what his pet mouse can do, so he tells Ralph he cannot leave and cannot have his motorcycle until he runs the maze. Ralph, angry, demands to return the motorcycle, but Ryan refuses and leaves Ralph alone at school overnight.

On the day of the exhibit, Ralph is so overstimulated that he cannot detect the scent of the peanut butter and struggles in the maze. Using his creativity, Ralph scales the wall and traverses the top of the maze to the end reward. Ryan and his classmate begin arguing, which escalates into a fight. After Miss K defuses the conflict, Ryan realizes that Ralph's motorcycle was destroyed in the tussle. Miss K forces Ryan and Brad to apologize to one another for the fight, but they still argue over who is at fault for breaking the motorcycle. Brad thinks Ryan's family has the means to replace it since he lives in a hotel, but Ryan explains that he only lives there because his mother is an employee. Brad's tone changes and the boys' relationship begins to grow.

Ralph decides to speak to Brad and reprimands him for breaking his motorcycle. Enchanted by Ralph, Brad gives him a tiny sportscar, which he uses as a replacement for his motorcycle. Ryan reads the newspaper and sees that in response to the class's letters, the reporter printed a retraction to the mouse infestation story. Ralph's relatives then show up, eager for a ride in his new car. Ralph uses the skills he learned at school from Miss K to teach the mice to form an orderly line. Ralph reflects on all he endured at school but decides it was worth it if Ryan made a new friend and he learned to better communicate with his relatives. Eventually, Ryan's mother and Brad's father meet, marry, and move to a new home. Ralph remains at the inn, safely tucked away under the grandfather clock during the day to avoid Brad's dog Arfy and racing during the night.

== Series ==
- The Mouse and the Motorcycle (1965)
- Runaway Ralph (1970)
- Ralph S. Mouse (1982)

== Film adaptation ==
Churchill Films produced an adaptation of Ralph S. Mouse in 1990, directed by Thomas G. Smith, and animation directed by John Clark Matthews, starring Robert Oliveri as Ryan and featuring Ray Walston as Matt, reprising his role from the previous adaptations. It was produced by George McQuilkin. It aired as part of the ABC Weekend Special in 1991.
