= Ming Lo Moves the Mountain =

Book by Arnold Lobel

- Author: Arnold Lobel
- Illustrator: Arnold Lobel
- Cover artist: Arnold Lobel
- Language: English
- Genre: Children's books Picture books
- Publisher: Greenwillow/William Morrow
- Publication date: 1982
- Publication place: United States
- Media type: Print

Ming Lo Moves the Mountain is a children's picture book by Arnold Lobel, published in 1982.

== Plot ==
A mountain towers over the little house where Ming Lo and his wife live, blocking sunlight and attracting rain. Ming Lo's wife tells Ming Lo that he must move the mountain. They follow the local wise man's advice without success. Finally, he tells them to perform a long dance with closed eyes while carrying all they possess, including the sticks of which their house is built. When they open their eyes, they find that the mountain has moved and happily rebuild their home.

== Reception ==
The book is an ALA Notable Children's book. A New York Times review said, "The tone of the story and the look of the book are as inseparable as Ming and the Mrs.: restrained and amusing, a measured dance to the accompaniment of gentle laughter." It is used as a lesson in schools in the book Literacy Instruction for Culturally and Linguistically Diverse Students and the book Great Teaching with Graphic Organizers. The book is also talked about in the book Balancing Acts.
