= Emilie Boon =

Dutch-American children's author and illustrator

- Born: The Netherlands
- Education: Royal Academy of Art, The Hague
- Known for: Children's book illustrator, author and educator
- Website: www.emilieboon.com

Emilie Boon is a Dutch-American children's author and illustrator. She was born in the Netherlands and has studied at the Royal Academy of Art at The Hague. Her books include Belinda's Balloon and the Peterkin series. The first in the series, Peterkin Meets a Star, has been made into an iPad and iPhone application. Boon has had books published by a number of publishers and in 8 languages. She has illustrated many books in collaboration with children's author, Harriet Ziefert, including the "Little Hippo" series. Boon has worked for Houghton Mifflin to illustrate online leveled readers that teach reading skills and improve content knowledge attainment. She teaches children's book illustration at the Rhode Island School of Design.

== Personal life ==
Boon was born in The Netherlands, she moved at an early age and was subsequently raised in many countries including Mexico where she lived for ten years. She attended the Royal Academy of Art where she majored in graphic design.

Boon is married with two children and lives in Newton, Massachusetts.

== Publishing ==
After graduation, she moved to London where she began writing and illustrating children's book. Her first book, Peterkin Meets a Star, was published by William Heinemann in England in 1983 and by Random House in North America a year later. She has written a total of seven books and then primarily focused on illustrating. She has often collaborated with author Harriet Ziefert.

Her method for creating illustrations is to use a combination of watercolors and a crayon resist technique.

=== Collaboration with Harriet Ziefert ===
==== Benji books ====
One of the 1996 published books, Benjy Bear's Halloween, was made for children from 3 to 6 years-of-age. It comes with reusable stickers that allow the little one's to pretend and play with different Halloween scenarios. They can select an emotion for the carved pumpkin's face, determine proportions for candy giving, and dress the bear for trick-or-treating.

==== Board books ====
Ziefert and Boon have made "board books" for preschoolers, which combine elements of a game and book reading to help children learn. In Timothy's Numbers, the book is packaged with "stiff colored foam" numbers that children insert into specific slots in the book as the illustrated rabbit, Timothy, helps them count. There is another book, Timothy's Shapes, which helps children discern shapes. The book boards are part of a trend in children's book publishing to combine merchandise and books.

==== Little Hippo books ====
Ziefert and Boon have collaborated on a series of "Little Hippo" books, the first of which was published in 1988 by Viking Penguin. The books have been written for children between 1 1/2 to 5 years-of-age. They are intended to help children deal with change, like the addition of a new baby to the family or moving to a new house. The hippo is drawn distinctively with stylized features, smudged outlines and light-gray coloring. In 1997, Boon saw a new series of "Little Hippo" books published by Scholastic, Inc. and claims that the characters are a take-off of her distinctive illustrations, use "Little Hippo" for its name and dress the hippo as she has. Further, Scholastic sought to trademark the image of the hippo for a line of books. Some of the titles of the little hippo books are: "Daddy Can You Play With Me?" "Little Hippo's New Baby," "Little Hippo's New House," and "Mummy Where Are You?"

Boon later obtained an attorney, Seth Salinger, through the Boston non-profit, "Volunteer Lawyers for the Arts." In 1999, Salinger filed a suit on Boon's behalf in Boston's federal court against Scholastic. Chuck Wentzel, a spokesman for Scholastic spokesman said, "Scholastic believes, based on our investigation, there was no copying done and that we will be successful in the litigation."

=== Online leveled readers ===
Boon has illustrated Houghton Mifflin online leveled readers, which combine written and audio technology to teach students to read and attain content knowledge. Fiction, math, science and social studies books are written and produced for specific English-language learner (ELL) levels. She is a "Little Book Illustrator" for Houghton Mifflin's Leveled Literacy Intervention program.

=== Digital books ===
The first book that Boon wrote and illustrated, Peterkin Meets a Star, has been made into an app for iPads and iPhones. The application provide sounds appropriate to the storytelling. For instance, the sound of Peterkin's boots on the snow make a crunching sound. PicPocket Bis the publisher of the app.

== Rhode Island School of Design ==
Boon has taught children's book illustration at the Rhode Island School of Design.

== Illustration events ==
Boon conducts sessions with children where she reads a book to the children and then takes them though how a book is made. Using an accordion-folded book the children use watercolors and crayons to write and illustrate the story.

== Professional organizations ==
She is a member of the Society of Children's Book Writers and Illustrators, Children's Book Artists and Picture Book Artists.

== Published works ==
Her books have been published in English, Norwegian, Swedish, Finnish, Dutch, French, Spanish, and Japanese. Publishers of her books include Knopf, Random House, Zonderkidz, Candlewick Press, D.K. Publishers, Sterling Publishing, Orchard Books, Cartwheel Books and Puffin Books.

=== Writer and illustrator ===
- Peterkin Meets a Star (1983)
- Peterkin's Wet Walk (1983)
- Belinda's Balloon (1985)
- It's Spring, Peterkin (1986)
- 1 2 3 How Many Animals Can You See? (1987)
- Peterkin's Very Own Garden (1987)
- Hannah's Helpers (1993)

=== Illustrator ===
Written by Harriet Ziefert

- Daddy Can You Play With Me? (1988)
- Mommy Where Are You? (1988)
- Benjy Bear's Halloween (1996)
- Benjy Bear's Christmas (1996)
- Timothy's Numbers (1996)
- Timothy's Shapes (1996)
- Little Hippo's New Baby (1997)
- Little Hippo's New House (1997)
- Little Hippo's New Friend (1999)
- Little Hippo's New School (1999)
- No Kiss for Grandpa (2001)
- Grandma, Where Are You? (2005)
- Grandpa, Will You Play With Me? (2005)

Written by other authors

- Ruth McCarthy, Katie and the Smallest Bear (1985)
- Joyce Dunbar, A Bun for Barney (1987)
- Orchard Books, The Orchard Children’s Treasury for Children of all Ages (1997)
- Orchard Books, The Orchard Baby and Toddler Collection (1999)

Houghton Mifflin online leveled books

- Bo Grayson, How the Coyote Stole Fire
- Regina Velazquez, How People Got Fire
