= Merlin and the Dragons =

- Directed by: Dennis Woodyard; Hu Yihong
- Written by: Jane Yolen
- Produced by: Joshua M. Greene
- Narrated by: Kevin Kline
- Edited by: Mo Pu Zhong
- Music by: Michel Rubini
- Production company: Lightyear Entertainment
- Distributed by: PBS
- Release date: November 9, 1991 (United States)
- Running time: 37 minutes
- Country: United States
- Language: English

Merlin and the Dragons is a 1991 animated film adapted from a story by Jane Yolen and illustrations by Alan Lee. It was directed by Dennis Woodyard (as Dennis J. Woodyard) and Hu Yihong and includes a musical score by composer Michel Rubini. The production is a retelling of the Arthurian legend, with Merlin the magician, based on material from Nennius and Geoffrey of Monmouth. Yolen is a prolific author of Arthurian-themed texts, and this production continues her series of retellings of the Merlin story. The half-hour film is narrated and voiced by Kevin Kline and was originally broadcast as an episode of the PBS program Long Ago and Far Away, which first aired on November 9, 1991.

The film has been released on VHS, DVD, and CD by Lightyear Entertainment as part of the "Stories to Remember" series; the CD includes the narration only and adds illustrations by Iain McCraig.

The story was later adapted by Yolen and illustrated by Li Ming, under the title Merlin and the Dragons (Cobblehill Books, 1995).

== Plot summary ==
A young King Arthur is woken from sleep by dreams questioning his right to rule, and consults Merlin, who narrates a story of his own of a young boy capable of precognition. The boy, called Emrys, is feared in his village and therefore called a demon. Eventually, King Vortigern forces his village to build him a fortress, which repeatedly collapses, whereupon his prophets advise the sacrifice of Emrys' life to support it. When Emrys is brought before Vortigern, he reveals a pool of water eroding the foundations of the fortress. When the pool is exposed, two dragons emerge from the stones therein, and the red is slain by the white. Time passes, and Emrys perceives an army coming to kill Vortigern. Soon after, Vortigern is defeated, and the story ends with Merlin revealing that he is Emrys and that Arthur's father is Uther Pendragon, whereupon Merlin and Arthur return to his mother.
