= Millicent Selsam =

American writer

- Born: Millicent Ellis Selsam; May 30, 1912; New York City, New York, U.S.
- Died: October 12, 1996 (aged 84)
- Education: Brooklyn College
- Occupation: Children’s author
- Spouse: Howard Selsam
- Children: 1

Millicent Ellis Selsam (May 30, 1912 – October 12, 1996) was an American children's author.

== Background ==
Selsam was born May 30, 1912, in New York City. She became interested in biology during her high school years. She took this interest to college when she studied biology at Brooklyn College. She was then offered a fellowship teaching at Columbia University while completing an M.A. in botany.

== Career ==
After receiving her M.A., Selsam taught high school science before deciding to write science discovery books for children in 1946. Her first book was Egg to Chick. After that her work found outlets at Harper & Row, Morrow, Macmillan, Doubleday and Walker, among other publishers. For some years she taught biology at Brooklyn College and in New York City high schools.

Selsam wrote over a hundred children's books and was married to the philosopher Howard Selsam. During her career, she was the recipient of many awards, including the 1965 Thomas Alva Edison Mass Media Award for best children's science book, Biography of an Atom.

== Personal life and death ==
Selsam married Howard Selsam. They had one child, Robert.

She died age 84 on October 12, 1996.

== Selected works ==
- Greg's Microscope, illustrated by Arnold Lobel
- A First Look at Animals With Horns, with Joyce Hunt, illustrated by Harriett Springer
- A First Look at Ducks, Geese, and Swans, with Joyce Hunt, illustrated by Harriett Springer
- A First Look at Bats, with Joyce Hunt, illustrated by Harriett Springer
- A First Look at Animals That Eat Other Animals, with Joyce Hunt, illustrated by Harriett Springer
- A First Look at Dinosaurs, with Joyce Hunt, illustrated by Harriett Springer
- Big Tracks, Little Tracks: Following Animal Prints, illustrated by Marlene Hill Donnelly
- Questions and Answers About Horses, illustrated by Sandy Rabinowitz
- Birth of an Island
- Tony's Birds
- Biography of an Atom, with Jacob Bronowski (1965 Edison Foundation winner for best children's science book)
- Mushrooms, illustrated by Jerome Wexler
- Egg to Chick, illustrated by Barbara M. Wolff
- Seeds and More Seeds
- How to Be a Nature Detective, illustrated by Ezra Jack Keats
- More Potatoes!, pictures by Ben Schecter
- Benny's Animals and How He Put Them in Order
- How Puppies Grow, with photographs by Esther Bubley
- How Kittens Grow, with photographs by Neil Johnson
- Terry and the Caterpillars, illustrated by Arnold Lobel
- Plenty of Fish
- Sea Monsters of Long Ago
- Stars, Mosquitoes, and Crocodiles : the American Travels of Alexander von Humboldt
- Let's Get Turtles
- Benny's Animals and How He Put Them in Order
- Birth of an Island, illustrated by Winifred Lubell
- Big Tracks, Little Tracks: Following Animal Prints, illustrated by Marlene Hill Donnelly
- The 'Don't Throw It, Grow It' Book of Houseplants
- Keep Looking!, with Joyce Huntby, illustrated by Normand Chartier
- Backyard Insects
- All Kinds of Babies, illustrated by Symeon Shimin
- See Through the Sea
- See Through the Forest
- See Through the Jungle
- See Through the Lake
- Around the World with Darwin, illustrated by Anthony Ravielli
- All About Eggs and How They Change Into Animals, illustrated by Helen Ludwig
- Birth of a Forest illustrated by Barbara Wolff
- Up, Down and Around: the force of gravity
- The Plants We Eat, photographs by Jerome Wexler
- The Tomato and Other Fruit Vegetables
- Land of the Giant Tortoise: The Story of the Galapagos illustrated with photographs by Les Line
- You and the World Around You illustrated by Greta Elgaard
- Doubleday First Guide to Wild Flowers
- Hidden Animals
- The Tiger: Its Life in the Wild
- How Puppies
- Is this a Baby Dinosaur? and Other Science Picture Puzzles
- The Apple and Other Fruits
- How Kittens Grow
- Tony's Birds
- Animals as Parents
- The Courtship of Animals
- How Animals Live Together
- How Animals Tell Time
- The Language of Animals
- Maple Tree
- Microbes at Work
- Milkweed
- Peanut
- Plants that Heal
- Plants that Move
- The Plants We Eat
- Play with Plants
- Play with Seeds
- Play with Trees
- Underwater Zoos
- The Amazing Dandelion with pictures by Jerome Wexler
- Bulbs, Corms and Such with pictures by Jerome Wexler
- Eat the Fruit, Plant the Seed with pictures by Jerome Wexler
- The Harlequin Moth, Its Life Story with pictures by Jerome Wexler
- Maple Tree with pictures by Jerome Wexler
- Mimosa, the Sensitive Plant with pictures by Jerome Wexler
- Peanut with pictures by Jerome Wexler
- Popcorn with pictures by Jerome Wexler
- Vegetables from Stems and Leaves with pictures by Jerome Wexler
- How Kittens Grow
- How Puppies Grow
- All Kinds of Babies
- Questions and Answers about Ants
- Questions and Answers about Horses
- A First Look at Animals with Backbones
- Hidden Animals

== See also ==
- Howard Selsam
