= Curious George (1984 film) =

- Directed by: John Clark Matthews
- Based on: Curious George by H. A. Rey
- Produced by: Robert Churchill; George McQuilken
- Starring: Corey Burton
- Music by: Michael Convertino; David Newman; John Clark Matthews
- Production company: Churchill Films
- Release date: May 25, 1984
- Running time: 14 minutes, 33 seconds
- Country: United States
- Language: English

Curious George (sometimes called Curious George: George Goes to the Zoo) is a 1984 short stop-motion animated children's film, and is based on H. A. Rey's 1941 book of the same name. The film is directed by John Matthews and was produced by Churchill Films. The company also produced Curious George Goes to the Hospital one year prior in 1983. The two films are often paired together and collectively called The Adventures of Curious George.

== Plot ==
Curious George is a monkey living in the African jungle. "The Man in the Yellow Hat" meets George and decides to take him to the city. The two begin riding home on a big ship, but George gets distracted by seagulls and falls into the water and must be rescued by the crew of the ship. After reaching the man's home, George eats a good meal and smokes a pipe before going to sleep in large, human-sized pajamas.

The next morning, the man telephones the zoo. George being curious, wants to use the telephone. After the man leaves, George uses the telephone, but accidentally calls the fire department. The firemen think there is an emergency, locate the call, and ride in their fire trucks to the house. When they don't find any fire, they arrest George for the false alarm. They tell George that since he fooled the fire department they will have to shut him up where he cannot do anymore harm. As a result, they take him away and shut him in a prison, where he starts making noise and grabbing at the window trying the bars struggling to get out. At that moment a watchman comes in and climbs on a wooden bed to catch him by trying to get him down, However he is heavy that the bed tips over and pins him against the wall. George is able to slip past and escape through the open door. George walks across the power lines. He finds a man selling balloons outside the prison wall, grabs the balloons, and floats over the city before landing on a traffic light. The Man in the Yellow Hat sees George from his car and gets him down. The man pays the balloon man for the balloons, then drives George to his wonderful new home at the zoo.

== Credits ==
- H. A. Rey – Co-writer of Curious George books
- John Clark Matthews – Director, Principal Animation, Original Themes, Puppets
- Robert Churchill – Executive Producer
- George McQuilken – Executive Producer
- Margret Rey – Story Consultant
- S. S. Wilson – Principal Animation
- Justin Segal – Other Animation, Props
- Anthony Alderson – Other Animation
- Gail Anderson – Other Animation, Props
- Richard Barkus – Other Animation
- Michael Convertino – Music
- David Newman – Music
- June Foray – Narration
- Corey Burton – Character Voices
- Jim Rice – Sound Effects
- Lisa Brenneis – Sound Effects
- Niki Matthews – Puppets
- Christine Mitchell – Props
- Ans Ellis – Props
- Anthony Alderson – Props
- Escott Norton – Props
- Jason Cardwell – Props
- Nan Lillith – Props
