= Howard Selsam =

American philosopher

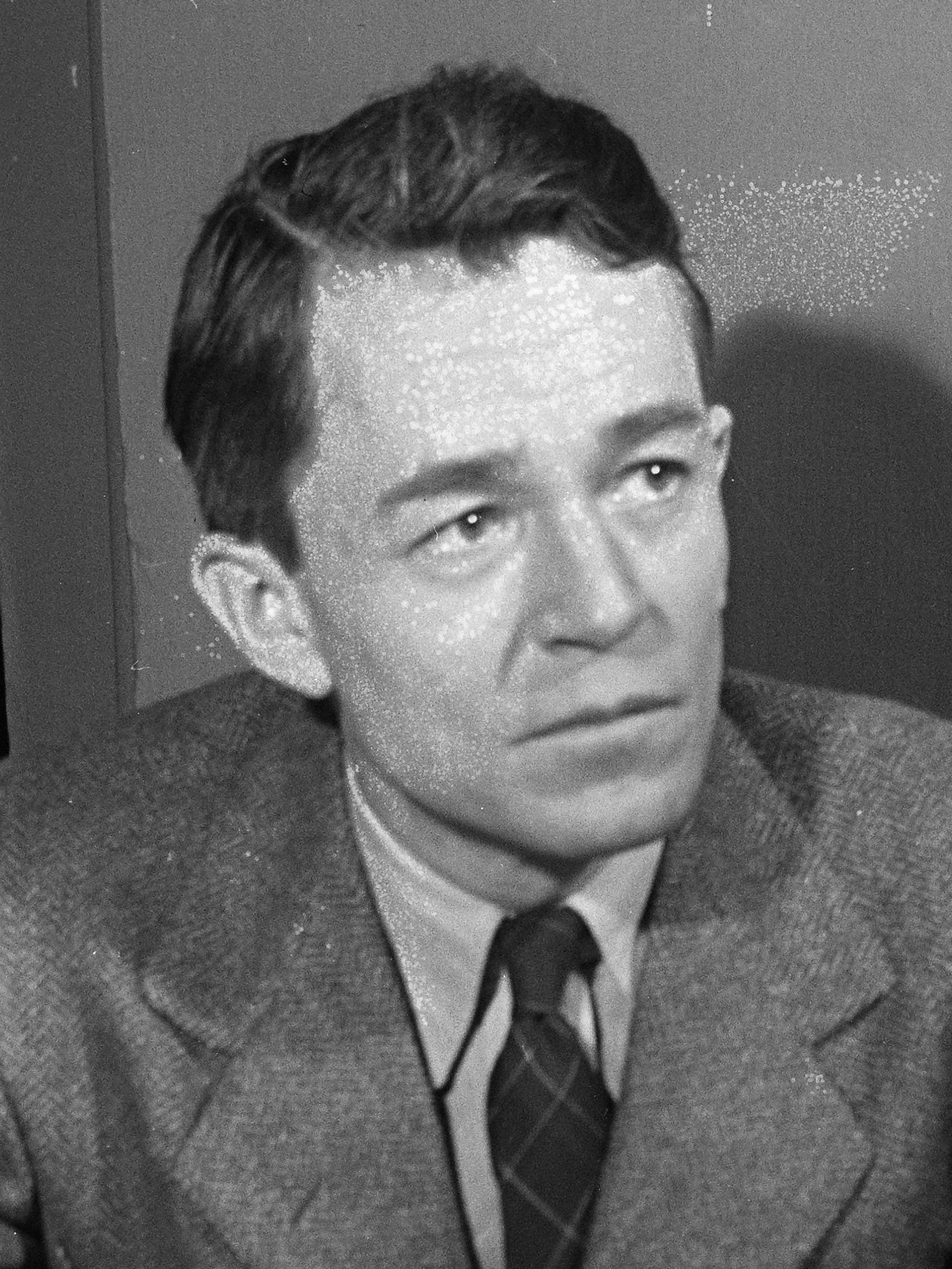
- Selsam in 1944
- Born: Howard Brillinger Selsam; June 28, 1903; Harrisburg, Pennsylvania, U.S.
- Died: September 7, 1970 (aged 67); New York City, New York, U.S.
- Education: Franklin & Marshall College; Columbia University
- Occupations: Instructor; Philosopher
- Spouse: Millicent Selsam
- Children: 1

Howard Selsam (born Howard Brillinger Selsam; 28 June 1903 – 7 September 1970) was an American Marxist philosopher.

== Background ==
Howard Brillinger Selsam was born on 28 June 1903 in Harrisburg, Pennsylvania. His parents were John T. Selsam, a grocer, and his mother was Flora Emig Selsam.

Selsam's education began in public schools in the Harrisburg area. Later, Selsam received his undergraduate degree in 1924 from Franklin & Marshall College, Lancaster, Pennsylvania. From 1924 through 1927, he taught at the American University of Beirut. Later, Selsam did graduate work in philosophy at Columbia University. At Columbia, he received both his MA (1928) and PhD (1931). Selsam's master's thesis dealt with Baron d'Holbach, and his dissertation concerned the English Hegelian philosopher Thomas Hill Green.

== Career ==
In 1931, after receiving his PhD, Selsam served as an instructor and later as an assistant professor at Brooklyn College, where he worked for 10 years. Active politically, Selsam participated in anti-war events on campus and took "an active part in the social struggles of his day on the side of the communist movement." Selsam's involvement is echoed in a contemporary newspaper article where Selsam is associated with Communist Party USA activities, yet he was careful not to impose his political beliefs on students. Nevertheless, Selsam published articles in left-wing periodicals such as The New Masses, although Selsam used the pseudonym "Paul Salter." The political activities of Selsam and other Brooklyn College faculty members attracted the attention of governmental investigation. Despite their denials of Communist association to reporters, Selsam and other faculty members later lost their teaching positions due to the Rapp-Coudert Committee investigations into Communist involvement in public education in New York State. That Selsam refused to testify at the hearings and faced contempt charges likely made his resignation unavoidable.

=== Communist schools ===
Circa 1941, Howard Selsam was one of the founders of the School for Democracy, an educational facility located at 13 Astor Place in New York and associated with the Communist Party USA.

In 1944, Selsam became the director of the Jefferson School of Social Science, a "Marxist adult education facility" whose faculty included "leftist academics dismissed from the City University of New York." He held this position from 1944-1956. Under Selsam's leadership (1944-1956), there was a steady flow of students at the Jefferson School. Even during the hey-day of Senator Joseph McCarthy's well publicized investigations into Communist subversion, the Jefferson School had an enrollment of 5,000 students each term. Nevertheless, the school received criticism claiming that students simply received dogmatic instruction. For example, a Rutgers University economics professor, Alexander Balinky enrolled in the school and took some classes. Based on his experiences at the school, Balinky wrote a newspaper article and claimed that the students received political indoctrination at the school.

In early December 1947 when news that the Jefferson School of Social Science had appeared on the Attorney General's List of Subversive Organizations (AGLOSO), Selsam told the New York Times:

There is nothing subversive about the Jefferson School. Its organization and teaching are open and above board. Its aims and purposes are clearly defined in its bulletin of courses and other material it issues. If the school is subversive, then any teaching of social science that differs from the beliefs of J. Edgar Hoover (chief of the Federal Bureau of Investigation) is to be labeled subversive.

Due to tensions caused by the Cold War, Anti-communism, and McCarthyism, the Jefferson School was subject to Congressional hearings and Selsam and others received summons to testify on several occasions. For example, Selsam, represented by Joseph Forer, testified before the U.S. Senate's Internal Security Subcommittee on 8 April 1953, and, during Selsam's testimony, he often invoked the Fifth Amendment.

Selsam and other school administrators denied that the school was a Communist front and fought against having it so officially labeled. Given the political radicalism of the faculty members and the Marxist-oriented instruction at the school, and facing external political pressure against the school, declining student enrollment, and publication in the West of Nikita Khrushchev's secret speech—a speech which described in detail Stalin's crimes and political purges —all of these factors ultimately forced the school administrators to close down the school in 1956.

=== SISS testimony ===
On April 8, 1953, represented by attorney Joseph Forer, Selsam accused the committee as much as it accused him. He blamed congressional committees for creating an "atmosphere of repression and terror." "Every witness... knows full well the meaning of your subpoena server's knock... dismissal from his job."

=== Khrushchev speech ===
Khrushchev's secret speech and its aftermath caused considerable turmoil within the Communist Party USA, and Selsam and other Jefferson School faculty members openly quit the Party in a joint letter published in the May 6, 1956 issue of the Daily Worker.

=== Later life ===
With the closure of the Jefferson School of Social Science, Selsam devoted much of his time lecturing and writing. He wrote a number of books on Marxist topics for International Publishers. Many of these books were republished in Canada, England, and India. In addition, Selsam's books were translated into a variety of languages, including Spanish, Arabic, Polish, Russian, German, Hungarian, and Japanese.

Besides writing books, Selsam wrote articles and reviews for periodicals, including The New Masses, and Marxism Today. He worked closely and collaborated with his wife Millicent Selsam, a botanist and high school teacher who was well known as an author of science books for young people.

Besides writing for The New Masses and Marxism Today, Selsam was an editorial board member for the Marxist journal Science & Society, and he was a founder of the American Institute for Marxist Studies.

Selsam had correspondence with prominent intellectuals and writers, including historian and civil rights activist W.E.B. Du Bois

== Personal life and death ==
Selsam married Millicent Selsam, a botanist and high school teacher

During his last years Selsam had a heart ailment, and he died in New York on September 7, 1970. He was survived by his wife, Millicent Selsam, a son, Robert, and his sister Mrs. Esther Garman.

== Partial bibliography of published works ==
- Selsam, Howard. 1930. T.H. Green: critic of empiricism. New York: [s.n.].
- Selsam, Howard. 1935. Spinoza: art and the geometric order. New York: Columbia University Press.
- Selsam, Howard. 1943. Socialism and Ethics. New York: International Publishers.
- Rozental, M. M., P. Yudin, and Howard Selsam. 1949. Handbook of Philosophy. New York: International Publishers.
- Selsam, Howard. 1953. The Negro people in the United States: facts for all Americans. New York: Jefferson School of Social Science.
- Selsam, Howard. 1957. Philosophy in Revolution. New York: International Publishers.
- Selsam, Howard, and Harry Martel. 1963. Reader in Marxist philosophy: from the writings of Marx, Engels, and Lenin. New York: International Publishers.
- Selsam, Howard. 1962. What is Philosophy? A Marxist Introduction. New York: International Publishers.
- Selsam, Howard. 1965. Ethics and Progress: New Values in a Revolutionary World. New York: International Publishers.
- Selsam, Howard, David Goldway, Harry Martel. 1970. Dynamics of Social Change: A Reader in Marxist Social Science, from the Writings of Marx, Engels and Lenin. New York: International Publishers.

== See also ==
- Anti-Communism
- Communism
- Dialectical materialism
- Ethics
- International Publishers
- Marxism
- McCarthyism
- Maurice Cornforth
- House Committee on Un-American Activities
- Rapp-Coudert Committee
- Socialism
- Subversion
- United States Senate Subcommittee on Internal Security
- Millicent Selsam
