= Stories to Remember =

Stories to Remember was a compilation of 6 animated stories made in the late 1980s and early-to-mid 1990s.

== The Stories ==
- Noah's Ark (1989)

Voiced by James Earl Jones

- Beauty and the Beast (1990)

Voiced by Mia Farrow

- Pegasus, The Flying Horse (1990)

Voiced by Mia Farrow

- Merlin and the Dragons (1991)

Voiced by Kevin Kline

- The Snow Queen (1992)

Voiced by Sigourney Weaver

- The Wild Swans (1994)

Voiced by Sigourney Weaver
