= The Mouse and the Motorcycle =

1965 children's novel by Beverly Cleary

- First edition
- Author: Beverly Cleary
- Illustrator: Louis Darling
- Language: English
- Series: The Mouse and the Motorcycle
- Publisher: William Morrow
- Publication date: 1965
- Publication place: United States
- Media type: Print (hardcover and paperback)
- Pages: 186
- OCLC: 22460783
- Followed by: Runaway Ralph

The Mouse and the Motorcycle is a children's novel written by Beverly Cleary, illustrated by Louis Darling and published in 1965. It is the first in a trilogy featuring Ralph S. Mouse, a house mouse who can speak to humans (though typically only children), goes on adventures riding his miniature motorcycle, and who longs for excitement and independence while living with his family in a run-down hotel.

The story and characters were inspired both by Cleary's son, who while recovering from a fever played with miniature cars and motorcycles, and by a neighbor who had shown Cleary a small mouse that had been trapped in a bucket.

The book was released as a selection of the Weekly Reader Children's Book Club (Intermediate Division) and won the William Allen White Children's Book Award in 1968. Cleary went on to write two more books featuring the Ralph S. Mouse character in the following decades, and a film adaptation of The Mouse and The Motorcycle was produced in 1986.

== Plot summary ==
Ralph is a mouse who lives in the run-down Mountain View Inn, a battered resort hotel in the Sierra Nevada mountain range of California. Ralph longs for a life of danger and speed, wishing to get away from his relatives, who worry about the mice colony being discovered. One day a boy named Keith Gridley and his family visit the hotel on their way through California. Keith leaves a toy motorcycle on his bedside table. While Keith is away, Ralph attempts to ride it, but cannot figure out how to start it. Startled by a telephone ring, both Ralph and the motorcycle fall into a metal wastebasket.

Keith discovers his missing motorcycle in the wastebasket. Although Ralph's mother worries that he is in contact with humans, Keith shows Ralph how to start the motorcycle—make an engine-like noise—and lets Ralph ride it at night. While Keith and his family explore California, Ralph recklessly rides the motorcycle through the depths of the hotel. One night he is spotted by Keith's mother, who initially thinks she is imagining things, but later is sure that she saw a mouse riding a motorcycle. Ralph and the motorcycle are almost sucked up by a maid's vacuum cleaner, but Ralph escapes, riding into a pile of linen and dirty bedsheets. He escapes by chewing holes in the sheets, forced to leave the precious vehicle behind.

After Ralph loses the motorcycle, Keith loses trust in him, though he still brings the mice colony food. One night Keith becomes very sick, because his parents do not have any more aspirin and are unable to obtain one until morning. To regain Keith's trust, Ralph searches the hotel for an aspirin tablet, at risk to himself, for the medicine could prove fatal to a small mouse if ingested (in fact, Ralph's father was taken down with a bad cold and died in spite of all they could do). Ralph is able to find an aspirin tablet and borrows Keith's toy ambulance to retrieve it. When Ralph succeeds, Keith's health is restored, and a housekeeper even finds his motorcycle hidden among the linens Ralph had used to escape. In gratitude, Keith gives Ralph the motorcycle to keep, Ralph uses the space under the television set in the lobby as a garage.

== Series ==
- The Mouse and the Motorcycle (1965)
- Runaway Ralph (1970)
- Ralph S. Mouse (1982)

== Film adaptation ==
Churchill Films produced an adaptation of The Mouse and the Motorcycle directed by Ron Underwood in 1986, featuring Mimi Kennedy and Ray Walston, which aired as an episode of ABC Weekend Special. The stop motion animation was done by John Matthews. The film was produced by George McQuilkin. The film received a Peabody Award.

The film was distributed on home video in 1987 by Strand VCI Entertainment, Golden Book Video under the "GoldenVision" label, and Weston Woods Studios.

Awards
Preceded by The Grizzly	Winner of the William Allen White Children's Book Award; 1968	Succeeded by Henry Reed's Baby-Sitting Service
