= Runaway Ralph =

Novel by Beverly Cleary

- First edition
- Author: Beverly Cleary
- Illustrator: Louis Darling
- Language: English
- Series: The Mouse and the Motorcycle
- Publisher: William Morrow
- Publication date: 1970
- Publication place: United States
- Media type: Print (hardcover and paperback)
- Pages: 175 pp
- ISBN: 0-380-70953-8
- OCLC: 25097417
- Preceded by: The Mouse and the Motorcycle
- Followed by: Ralph S. Mouse

Runaway Ralph is the second in a children's novel trilogy that was written by Beverly Cleary. First published in 1970, it is the last book by Cleary that Louis Darling illustrated before his death. The book features the titular character, Ralph S. Mouse, a house mouse that can talk to humans, and goes on adventures on his miniature motorcycle.

The book was given the Nene Award by the Hawaii Library Association in 1972.

== Plot summary ==
Fed up with his bratty family, Ralph the mouse hops onto his toy motorcycle and speeds down the road away from the Mountain View Inn toward Happy Acres Camp, where he encounters Sam, a nosy watchdog, and is captured by a boy named Garfield (or Garf) and kept as a pet. Separated from his motorcycle, Ralph must endure life in a cage with an annoying hamster named Chum. Over time, Ralph and Garf form a relationship similar to the one Ralph and Keith had in the original book in the series.

Ralph's adventures at Happy Acres Camp include escapades with an evil cat, the return of a missing watch, the escape from his cage, and being reunited with his beloved motorcycle. He eventually begins feeling homesick and strikes a bargain with Garf: return the motorcycle and bring him back to the Mountain View Inn, in exchange for clearing Garf's name (the rest of the children at Happy Acres Camp believe Garf was the one who took the missing watch). Eventually, the watch is returned, and Garf reassures Ralph that he will go back home the next day.

== Series ==
- The Mouse and the Motorcycle (1965)
- Runaway Ralph (1970)
- Ralph S. Mouse (1982)

== Film adaptation ==
Churchill Films produced an adaptation of Runaway Ralph directed by Ron Underwood in 1988, starring Fred Savage as Garf and featured Ray Walston reprising his role as Matt from the adaptation of The Mouse and the Motorcycle, airing as a two-part special on the ABC Weekend Special. The animation was done by John Matthews. The producer was George McQuilkin. The film received Emmy nominations for Outstanding Children Special, Best Directing and Writing Special Class. The film was distributed by Strand VCI Entertainment in 1991 and by Anchor Bay Entertainment in 1999.
