= Mouse Soup =

1977 picture book by Arnold Lobel

- Cover
- Author: Arnold Lobel
- Illustrator: Arnold Lobel
- Series: I Can Read!
- Genre: Picture book
- Publisher: Harper & Row
- Publication date: 1977
- Pages: 64 pp.
- ISBN: 978-0-06-023967-1
- OCLC: 2542419

Mouse Soup is a 1977 picture book by noted illustrator Arnold Lobel. Beginning with the simple sentence "A mouse sat under a tree", the book goes on to tell the story of a mouse who has to trick a weasel from turning him into mouse soup. He does that by telling stories about Bees and the Mud, Two Large Stones, The Crickets, and The Thorn Bush, and tells the weasel to put them into his soup. It is soon revealed that the mouse got away and the weasel was seriously injured.

== Plot ==
A male mouse leaves his house to sit under a tree to read a book. While he reads, a weasel suddenly captures him. The weasel then takes the mouse back to his home, thinking of making mouse soup with the mouse. Just as the weasel puts the mouse into the pot, the rodent tells the crafty weasel that the soup will not taste good without any stories in it at all. The weasel does feel hungry, but agrees to let the mouse tell him four stories that will go in the pot, all of which features a mouse as a main or side character.

The Bees and the Mud

A mouse is walking along when a beehive falls on his head. He tries to reason with the bees to go away, but the bees decide to use his head as their new home due to them liking his head. The mouse then comes up with a plan to submerge himself in a mud hole, claiming to the bees that it is his home. He keeps wading in deeper, describing each depth as a room in his house, but the bees approve and remain on his head. Finally, when the rodent submerges his head under the mud, passing it off as his bed, the bees finally decide that they dislike his bed and they go away, allowing the mouse to go home to take a bath.

Two Large Stones

Two large stones sit on a hill and wonder what's on the other side, as they can't move from the spot where they sit. When they ask a bird to check, the avian soon returns and tells them about buildings, cities, mountains, and valleys on the other side. The thought of not being able to see those things makes the stones sad. A hundred years soon pass and then a mouse passes by, and the stones ask him to check the other side of the hill. The rodent soon tells them that it is the same as the side the stones reside on. This makes the stones feel glad that they are not missing anything, but they wonder whether the mouse or the bird was right.

The Crickets

In the third story, a cricket gets the urge to play music in the middle of the night, but his singing disturbs a female mouse, who is trying to get some sleep. Each time the lady mouse demands not to hear any more music, the cricket, who can't hear her over his loud music, thinks she said she does want more music and so calls over a lot of friends. Soon, the crickets are making so much noise with their singing that the lady mouse simply shouts at them to go away, to which the cricket wonders why she did not say so before. After the crickets go away to play their music somewhere else, the mouse goes back to bed, although the newfound quietness proves to be a new distraction.

The Thorn Bush

In the fourth story, a mouse police officer comes to the home of an old and female mouse because she is crying. She shows him a thorn bush that is growing out of her chair. Initially, the officer offers to dispose of it so the lady can sit again, but she explains that she does not care about sitting, and she is crying because she loves the bush and it is dying. He advises her to throw some water on the thorn bush right away, which causes it to grow into a bunch of roses. To thank the officer, the old female mouse gives him both a kiss on the cheek and some of the roses as his payments.

After finishing his stories, the mouse tells the weasel to bring in the things that were associated with the stories: a bee's nest, some mud, two stones, ten crickets, and a thorn bush. The weasel leaves his house, without closing the door on the way out, allowing the mouse to escape and follow the weasel at a distance. The rodent then witnesses the predator suffering for his fool's errand. After getting stung by bees, gathering up wet sticky mud, struggling with two heavy stones, jumping to catch crickets, and getting pricked by a thorn bush, the weasel now thinks he will have a tasty soup. Upon arriving home, the weasel sees the empty pot and realizes he has been tricked. The mouse, by this time, has safely returned to his own house and, after having some dinner, finishes reading his book.

== Audio recording ==
In 1978, Scholastic Records issued a 7-inch 33 1/3 r.p.m. record (SCC 2807) of the author reading the story. It was directed by Bernice Chardiet, produced by Robert Mack, and contained music by Albert Hague.

== Stop motion film ==
In 1992, the book was made into a 26-minute musical stop motion animated film for the TV series Long Ago and Far Away by Churchill Films, directed by John Clark Matthews and starring Buddy Hackett as the voice of Mouse and Will Ryan as the voice of Weasel.
