= Days With Frog and Toad =

American children's book

- Cover art for Days With Frog and Toad
- Author: Arnold Lobel
- Illustrator: Arnold Lobel
- Language: English
- Series: Frog and Toad
- Subject: Friendship
- Genre: Children's picture book
- Publisher: Harper & Row (I Can Read)
- Publication date: January 1, 1979
- Publication place: United States
- Pages: 64
- ISBN: 9781094255323
- OCLC: 4515430
- LC Class: PZ7.L7795 Day
- Preceded by: Frog and Toad All Year

Days With Frog and Toad is an American children's picture book, written and illustrated by Arnold Lobel and published by Harper & Row in 1979. It is the fourth and final book in the Frog and Toad series. Like the other three books, it comprises five easy-to-read short stories. It has received positive reviews, and is used in classroom settings. It contains themes of friendship, adventure, and solitude.

== Summary ==
=== "Tomorrow" ===
Toad wakes up and realizes that he has a lot of work to do, which he decides to leave for tomorrow. Frog proceeds to tell Toad about his work, such as cleaning the house or taking care of his plants. This upsets Toad, and now he cannot stop thinking about the amount of work he has for tomorrow. Toad then realizes that if he does the work today, he will not have to do it tomorrow. He readily does all of the work he planned for the next day so tomorrow he can enjoy himself.

=== "The Kite" ===
Frog and Toad decide they want to fly a kite on a windy day. Toad tried to fly the kite, but it comes back down. Robins in a nearby bush make fun of Toad. He tries to give up, but Frog convinces him to try again, this time shaking the kite, which fails, further amusing the robins. Again and again, Toad tries to give up but Frog continues to convince him to try again. Eventually, Frog suggests trying shouting "Up kite up!". This causes the kite to soar high into the air, and Frog and Toad sit and watch. The robins, feeling mocked, attempt to fly higher than the kite, but the birds are unable to.

=== "Shivers" ===
On a cold and dark night, Frog tells an uncertain Toad a ghost story which gives them both the shivers. Frog's story begins with walking with his parents for a picnic, but on the way home they lose their way and they warn their son of the Old Dark Frog who eats children for dinner. He is left alone while his parents search for a path home and the Old Dark Frog appears in front of Frog. Toad questions Frog about the story authenticity, but Frog shrugs it off and continues. The Dark Frog told Frog he is not hungry now, but after he jump ropes one hundred times, he will be. He demands Frog to turn the rope so the Dark Frog can jump. When the Dark Frog gets to 90, Frog ties the Dark Frog to the tree with the rope, runs away, and makes it home safe with his parents.

=== "The Hat" ===
Frog gives Toad a hat on his birthday, which is too big, and Frog offers to fix it. Toad says he likes it the way it is, but he trips and falls because he cannot see. Toad is upset, and Frog tells Toad to think very big thoughts to make his head grow. While Toad dreams of giant sunflowers, mountains, and trees, Frog sneaks into Toad's house while he sleeps and takes his hat. He pours water on the hat and lets it dry so the hat would shrink and returns it to Toad. Toad is amazed when the hat fits in the morning. Frog and Toad go for a walk while Toad wears the hat, and he does not run into anything.

=== "Alone" ===
Frog writes to Toad that he wants to be alone, but Toad finds Frog on an island and assumes he is sad. Toad makes a picnic and tries to get Frog's attention, but he does not notice. Toad rides a turtle out to Frog and apologizes for whatever he has done to hurt Frog. He falls off the turtle, ruining the picnic, and Frog pulls him out of the water. Frog tells Toad he is happy and likes having him as a friend. He wanted to be alone to think about how good life is. Toad understands and they eat the soggy sandwiches and enjoy their afternoon.

== Style and theme ==
Like the other books in the series, Days With Frog and Toad portrays Frog and Toad as cartoony amphibians with green, tan, and brown watercolors. The friends are humorous and warm. The book contains relatable experiences for children and the themes of adventure and friendship, making it engaging to young readers. The story "Shivers" has themes of ghosts and spooky creatures, and the story "Alone" has themes of solitude.

== Publication ==
Days With Frog and Toad was written and illustrated by Arnold Lobel and published on January 1, 1979 by Harper & Row. It is the fourth book in the Frog and Toad series. It is available in paperback, hardcover, audio, and eBook formats. It is also included as a part of Frog and Toad: A Complete Reading Collection.

== Analysis ==
Days With Frog and Toad is a children's picture book and a Level Two I Can Read book. The book is recommended for ages 4–7. It is used in elementary classrooms and lesson plans to teach children to read and to model problem solving and divergent thinking. Frog and Toad are portrayed as a "straight man" (calm and reasonable) and a "clown" (goofy and over dramatic) respectively, which is a common comedic pairing.

== Reception ==
Days With Frog and Toad received mostly positive reviews and won the Zilveren Penseel award in 1983. Mary Dixon Weidler from Common Sense Media states that Days With Frog and Toad is written in a "simple, yet engaging fashion" and that "their adventures… are so down-to-earth that young readers relate instantly". She warns parents that the story "Shivers" is a "bit edgy" for the series, but says that children are typically captivated by ghosts and goblins.
