= Fables (Lobel book) =

1980 picture book by Arnold Lobel

- First edition.
- Author: Arnold Lobel
- Illustrator: Arnold Lobel
- Cover artist: Lobel
- Genre: Children's picture book
- Publisher: Harper & Row
- Publication date: August 6, 1980
- Publication place: United States
- ISBN: 978-0-06-023973-2
- OCLC: 5829958
- LC Class: PZ8.2.L6 Fab

Fables is a children's picture book written and illustrated by American author Arnold Lobel. Released by Harper & Row in 1980, it was the recipient of the Caldecott Medal for illustration in 1981.

For each of the twenty fables, Lobel's text occupies one page, with his color illustration on the facing page. He gives a moral to each, but while the moral is genuine, the tone of the fables is cheerful and playful rather than moralistic. For instance, in the first fable a bed-loving crocodile admires the orderly pattern of flowers on his bedroom wallpaper. When confronted with the riot of flowers in Mrs. Crocodile's garden he retreats to his bed in distress, where he is comforted by the neat floral rows of the wallpaper. After that he seldom leaves his bed, becoming a sickly shade of green. The moral is, "Without a doubt, there is such a thing as too much order."

== List of Fables ==
- The Crocodile in the Bedroom:
  - Plot: A crocodile enjoys the orderly flowered wallpaper in his bedroom, over his wife's messy garden, but becomes sickly upon never leaving.
  - Moral: Without a doubt, there is such a thing as too much order.
- The Ducks and the Fox:
  - Plot: Two ducks meet a seemingly friendly fox, while taking their regular path to their pond. But when the fox shows his true colors, they decide to search for a new safer path.
  - Moral: At times, a change of routine can be most healthful.
- King Lion and the Beetle:
  - Plot: An arrogant lion king demands that everybody, including a tiny beetle, bow to him. However the King receives a humiliating blow, upon inspecting the beetle's bow.
  - Moral: It is the high and mighty who have the longest distance to fall.
- The Lobster and the Crab:
  - Plot: An adventurous lobster takes a timid crab on a boat ride through an ocean storm, and both end up enjoying themselves.
  - Moral: Even the taking of small risks will add excitement to life.
- The Hen and the Apple Tree:
  - Plot: A hen finds a talking apple tree outside her house. The "tree" invites her out to enjoy its company, but several obvious clues, such as a furry trunk of legs and a mouth of sharp teeth, suggest there's an ulterior motive.
  - Moral: It is always difficult to pose as something that one is not.
- The Baboon's Umbrella:
  - Plot: A baboon with an umbrella is advised by a friend to cut holes in it, so he can enjoy the beautiful weather, but things end up going terribly wrong after that.
  - Moral: Advice from friends is like the weather. Some of it is good; some of it is bad.
- The Frogs at the Rainbow's End:
  - Plot: Three frogs travel to the end of the rainbow to secure its treasure, but find another unexpected surprise instead.
  - Moral: The highest hopes may lead to the greatest disappointments.
- The Bear and the Crow:
  - Plot: A bear is determined to impress the townspeople with his fancy dress, but falls for some bad fashion tips from a troublemaking crow and ends up humiliated.
  - Moral: When the need is strong, there are those who will believe anything.
- The Cat and his Visions:
  - Plot: A cat has great visions of a fish feast while fishing, but they gradually wane as time goes by without a nibble.
  - Moral: All's well that ends with a good meal.
- The Ostrich in Love:
  - Plot: A shy ostrich takes great measures to show his love for a female, but can't bring himself to tell her how he feels.
  - Moral: Love can be its own reward.
- The Camel Dances:
  - Plot: A camel teaches herself how to dance, but is not able to impress anyone but herself with her skills.
  - Moral: Satisfaction will come to those who please themselves.
- The Poor old Dog:
  - Plot: A homeless dog with shabby clothing finds a ring and wishes for better conditions. Things do eventually work out, but not in the way he expects.
  - Moral: Wishes, on their way to coming true, will not be rushed.
- Madame Rhinoceros and her Dress:
  - Plot: A rhinoceros is enamored with a dress she sees, and buys it. However she has second thoughts upon trying it on, and receives mixed reviews from others.
  - Moral: Nothing is harder to resist than a bit of flattery.
- The Bad Kangaroo:
  - Plot: When the school principal becomes fed up with a young kangaroo's pranks, he wishes to meet with the kangaroo's parents, but is in for an even bigger surprise.
  - Moral: A child's conduct will reflect the ways of his parents.
- The Pig at the Candy Store:
  - Plot: After a dream of candy, a pig wakes up with a craving for some, and darts to the candy store. When it turns out to be closed, the pig decides it was for the best.
  - Moral: A locked door is very likely to discourage temptation.
- The Elephant and His Son:
  - Plot: A young elephant's singing distracts his cigar-smoking father, who's so focused on reading his newspaper, he doesn't even notice another disaster happening right in front of him.
  - Moral: Knowledge will not always take the place of simple observation.
- The Pelican and the Crane:
  - Plot: A crane invites an outcast pelican to tea, and learns there's a reason he's an outcast.
  - Moral: When one is a social failure, the reasons are as clear as day.
- The Young Rooster:
  - Plot: After the death of his father, a rooster initially struggles to assume the responsibility of waking the sun every morning, but his second attempt shocks everyone.
  - Moral: A first failure may prepare the way for later success.
- The Hippopotamus at Dinner:
  - Plot: A hungry hippopotamus greedily overindulges at a restaurant, and ends up regretting it, when he's trapped by his enlarged gut.
  - Moral: Too much of anything often leaves one with a feeling of regret.
- The Mouse at the Seashore:
  - Plot: A young mouse endures several hardships on a journey from his parents to the ocean, but declares it was worth it.
  - Moral: All the miles of a hard road are worth a moment of true happiness.

== Reception ==
ALA wrote "Short, original fables with fresh, unexpected morals poke subtle fun at human foibles through the antics of animals. . . . The droll illustrations, with tones blended to luminescent shading, are complete and humorous themselves.", while Kirkus Reviews found "there's not a jot of wit, wisdom, style, or originality in these 20 flat and predictable items. The illustrations ... suffer for having less to illustrate." Horn Book wrote, "the author-illustrator has invented twenty animal fables with an original flavor" and "Each miniature narrative occupies a page by itself and is balanced by a full-page picture which reflects the crucial event of the fable and portrays the joyfully conceived characters." Publishers Weekly called the book "the most remarkable of the author-illustrator's 60-plus, bestselling award winners." In a retrospective essay about the Caldecott Medal-winning books from 1976 to 1985, Barbara Bader wrote that "in Lobel's natural hand, in spontaneous, cartoony sketches or comic stylizations, the work would have had more sparkle and less ponderousness."

Awards
Preceded by Ox-Cart Man	Caldecott Medal recipient 1981	Succeeded by Jumanji
