= Bernard Wiseman =

American author

Bernard Wiseman

Bernard Wiseman (26 August 1922 – 11 January 1995) was an American author and illustrator of children's books along with cartoons for adults. Between 1958 and 1995, Wise wrote and illustrated dozens of humorous picture books including the popular Morris and Boris series.

== Life ==
Wiseman was born in the Canarsie section of Brooklyn, New York on August 26, 1922, to Abraham Z. Wiseman and Yetta Goldtein Wiseman. Wiseman was interested in drawing cartoons from a young age and was the art director for his high school yearbook.

He joined the U.S Coast Guard during World War II and rose to the rank of bosun's mate, seeing action in the Atlantic Ocean on a destroyer escort. During Wiseman's time in the Coast Guard he continued drawing cartoons, even selling some of them to magazines. He said he'd think of cartoon ideas while on watch and then draw and mail them to his mother, who submitted them to different magazines.

In 1977, Wiseman and his wife Susan and stepson Peter moved to Melbourne, Florida. There he had two sons of his own, Michael and Andrew.

Wiseman died in 1995. He is interred in Arlington National Cemetery.

== Career ==
After being honorably discharged in 1946, Wiseman began working as a cartoonist in New York City. Known as "an amiable professional," Wiseman worked for numerous publications and editors with his cartoons and illustrations frequently appearing in The New Yorker, Playboy, Punch, The Saturday Evening Post, and other publications. He also drew advertisements for various clients and illustrated short pieces in two early issues of Mad magazine. In addition, Wiseman created a series for Boys' Life magazine called Sir Nervous Norman, which were humorous stories about an insecure medieval knight.

Wiseman also illustrated booklets for Radio Free Europe that were dropped by balloons into Communist countries in eastern Europe.

Wiseman worked under a contract for The New Yorker for 12 years after leaving the Coast Guard. However, after the magazine's co-founder and editor Harold Ross passed away, he shifted his focus to writing and illustrating early reader children's books. In all, Wiseman published over 80 books. He described his method of writing and illustrating picture books by saying, "I work slowly when I think them out, fast when I write them, and polish most slowly of all. The drawing part of it is a pleasure for me and I relax a bit when I get to that."

== Morris and Boris series ==
Morris and Boris: Three Stories (1974) Front Cover

Wiseman is mainly remembered for his Morris and Boris series of easy reader picture books for young children, with the first book in the series, Morris the Moose, published in 1959. A dozen books in the series were eventually published.

In the series, Morris and his friend Boris the Bear experience numerous Abbott and Costello-style adventures. The books are noted for using simple puns, repeated misunderstandings, and "the escalating antagonism between the bright but ignorant Morris, who takes everything literally, and the impatient ever-explaining Boris." While Boris is frequently infuriated by Morris, the books end happily "with the friends having a good laugh."

In 1989, Churchill Films released a stop-motion animated adaptation of Morris Goes to School, which was noted for emphasizing to children the positive advantages of learning to read and write. Four years later, the studio released a cartoon based on Morris Has a Cold.

== Critical reception ==
Wiseman's picture books were noted for their comedy-team dynamic, with his stories about Morris the Moose and Boris the Bear being called "absolutely hilarious" by Joseph Stanton. School Library Journal said of the book Morris and Boris that the dialogue was "reminiscent of a Smothers Brothers routine, and the exuberant cartoon illustrations will keep young readers giggling." In another review, the publication said that "Wiseman has a successful formula" with the Morris and Boris books, in that "Morris is the perpetual child, self-centered and a bit greedy yet totally guileless and unself-conscious. Boris is the perfect straightman."

Wiseman's book Morris the Moose was praised by philosopher Gareth Matthews, who called the book a "delightful thought experiment" and added that "The plot of this little story could hardly be simpler; yet the questions it raises are very profound." Matthews observed that the book covered the distinction "between essential and accidental properties" and that "whimsical questions" of the sort posed in Morris the Moose "can serve to introduce a thoughtful discussion of the practical and philosophical problems of taxonomy." Wiseman's book has also been analyzed as an example of how to demonstrate philosophical logic to children because Morris draws a false conclusion from true premises, namely believing a cow is actually a moose because they both have four legs, a tail and horns.
