= Bill the Minder =

- VHS cover from 1987
- Created by: Timothy Forder; Based on the book by W. Heath Robinson
- Voices of: Peter Chelsom
- Country of origin: United Kingdom
- Original language: English
- No. of episodes: 15

Production
- Running time: 5 minutes

Original release
- Network: ITV
- Release: 17 February – 7 March 1986

Bill the Minder is a book and television series that tells of the adventures of a 15-year-old boy and his cousins Boadicea and Chad. In the process of their adventures they meet many strange people and help solve their unique problems with the use of fantastic machines which Bill is capable of crafting in a short time.

The original book was written and illustrated by W. Heath Robinson and published in 1912. The televised series contains a large number of the fantastic machines that Robinson is famed for. The short series was produced at Bevanfield Films for ITV Central and shown on ITV. All 15 episodes were released on one VHS tape by Channel 5 Video.

Bill the Minder was awarded at the London Film Festival in 1986 for "Outstanding Film of the Year".

== Episode summaries ==
After the brief title sequence with title music the narrator introduces the characters (the same way each episode except for the first), and his introduction goes like this:

Bill the minder looked after his cousins Boadicea and Chad.
They wandered with him everywhere, even in his dreams.

At the end of the episode the same basic title page is displayed but with more credits and the same title music is played. The theme music is the "Triumphal March" from Verdi's opera Aida.

- Episode 1 – "Old Crispin"

Bill visits his uncle Crispin, a mushroom picker who is so skilled that he can hear the mushrooms popping up from the ground, but Old Crispin is growing unhappy and has taken ill. He is sent on a holiday but that does not help. His wife tries to feed him but he refuses, until one day she feeds him jelly. He eats so much jelly that he becomes too fat to pick mushrooms. Bill builds a machine which Old Crispin can use to lose weight. Bill agrees to take on his two cousins Boadicea and Chad to keep them out of the way.

- Episode 2 – "The King"

Bill and his companions come across an unhappy king while walking over the downs. The King tells them that he was such a good king, the kingdom prospered and his subjects held him so highly they would not visit him. He grew lonely and sad. One day, his prime minister took him away to the chicken shed, where the king and his ministers played cards and dominoes all through the night and roasted one of the chickens. In the morning, the old cock would call, and they would return to the palace. This went on for a while until they had eaten all the hens, so they cooked the old cock. This caused them to forget the time, and they were discovered by the subjects. The king fled in shame at being found in a chicken house. Bill makes the lazy king a chair and agrees to take him back to his kingdom.

- Episode 3 – "The Navigator"

Bill, Boadicea, Chad and the king discover a lonesome man. He introduces himself as Ron, the navigator aboard the 'Turnip of Göteborg'. He explains that he is in love with the beautiful Jane Osbaldistone de Trevor de Boulogne, but the woman finds him dull, so he uses his advantageous position as a seaman to find unusual things from all over the world. He has found a seed of the rare 'Australian nose plant' which produces the loveliest scent, but he cannot grow it as it requires very specific conditions. Bill builds a machine which gives the seed the perfect growing conditions and the flower grows perfectly. Ron the Navigator becomes happy, until the postman delivers a letter from Jane Osbaldistone de Trevor de Boulogne telling him she has married. Ron the Navigator agrees to join the children's adventures.

- Episode 4 – "Aunt Galladia"

Bill meets his aunt, who is calling to her beloved Norris, a rare 'Green toed button crane of Baraboo', who is high up in a tree. Bill advises her to tie a 'Peruvian yak bean' to a hook on a stick, but this fails, so Bill devises a machine which will catch the bird. The machine makes a loud honking sound next to the bird, which jumps in shock into the cage at the other side. Aunt Galladia is so pleased that she gives the bird to Bill.

- Episode 5 – "The Respectable Gentleman"

The gang is walking and spots an ice-cream seller. The king grows more and more annoying in his desire to have one. They meet a gentleman and Bill asks him if he will get them one for the king. He agrees and the king gets his ice-cream, but he sucks so powerfully that a spot of chocolate sauce lands on the gentleman's overcoat, causing the gentleman to faint. Boadicea and Chad both try to remove the stain but fail, so Bill makes a machine to clean the jacket. The gentleman becomes happy and, as it is getting late, agrees to take the king home.

- Episode 6 – "Chloe"

Bill, Boadicea and Chad go home. Boadicea and Chad go to their mother's house. Their mother (Chloe) is a remarkable woman who can do anything, but Boadicea and Chad are constantly taking her things and generally getting under her feet. Bill helps out their mother by tying a piece of fishing line to all of her items so that whenever she may need them all she has to do is reel them back in. Bill agrees to take Boadicea and Chad out on an adventure to keep them out of the way.

- Episode 7 – "The Doctor"

Bill and his companions are walking through some thick grass when they come across the famous doctor Ebeneezer Sprout, who is miserable. The Doctor tells Bill that he was such a successful doctor that people came night and day to get his fantastic remedies. Before long, the streets were deserted and the factories and shops were all abandoned because the people were going to see him. The doctor was so overworked that he left his practise and came to the downs, and now he is sad because he has no patients. Bill comes up with a fantastic "Doctors' friend", which is a seasick making machine which the doctor himself tries. The machine is so good the doctor has to use the sick bag after a few moments. The doctor agrees to come along and search for patients with the gang.

- Episode 8 – "The Sicilian Cleaning Lady"

Bill and his companions come across a Sicilian cleaning lady, who tells them a story which Bill translates. She is a professional household cleaner working for the 'Petigrew' family, but they are not very nice, they complain all the time and are unreasonable. She says that the worst thing for her is the child, Basil Herbert Petigrew. His singing annoys her to the point of insanity, but none of her methods can shut him up. Bill makes a machine which wheels Basil out of the window and covers him in cold water. This works, but the Petigrews move away and leave the cleaning lady unemployed, so she joins the gang on their adventure.

- Episode 9 – "The Button Crane of Baraboo"

Bill and his friends meet with the respectable gentleman named Norris, the 'green toed button crane of Baraboo', who burps every time he is fed with 'Peruvian yak bean'. Doctor Sprout writes him a prescription that does not work, so the cleaning lady gives him some of her ancient family recipe but that does not work either. Bill makes a machine which slaps the birds back and gives him water. It works, but now the bird lets out some flatulence whenever he is given a bean.

- Episode 10 – "The Waiter"

While walking through the downs, the Sicilian cleaning lady stops and sits down, refusing to move. She tells the story of when she was back in Florence and fell in love with a waiter. She thought that she would never see him again until she got a letter from him in the morning. When the letter was torn from her hand by a sudden gust of wind, she dropped the corner she was holding on to and chased after the letter. She managed to recover the letter, but the lost corner contained the gentleman's address. Bill asks her to point out the exact spot she lost the corner and as she does, he notices that the corner is stuck in her stockings. To save embarrassment for all parties, he devises a machine made of mirrors. The lady looks into it, sees the corner piece, and writes to the gentleman. The waiter comes and she says goodbye to the gang.

- Episode 11 – "Bosworth"

The gang returns home and Bill goes down to fields to watch Uncle Crispin gathering his mushrooms. Crispin is getting lonely and he creates an imaginary friend called 'Bosworth', who soon causes trouble and Crispin thinks that Bosworth is everywhere. Bill then designs a machine that makes loud noises and believes that this will scare Bosworth. Bill chases Bosworth into the match stick model of St Paul's Cathedral (which his wife hates) and soon destroys his cathedral. Bill then takes Boudicea and Chad out for another hike.

- Episode 12 – "The Musician"

Bill hears music and, after a brief walk, the gang finds a musician playing a squeeze box. Bill asks him why he is sitting there all alone. The musician tells them that he has been dedicated to music all his life, and it had always been his ambition to have one of his pieces played in a large concert hall. He toiled for years on his masterpiece and finally finished it. It was so good that he was invited to conduct a great orchestra, but when he was ready to conduct, his emotions took over and he sobbed, tears running down his face and onto his score sheets, ruining his work. He ran out of the concert hall in shame. He tells the gang that he has composed an even better symphony but cannot find an orchestra who will play it. Boadicea says if he plays his squeeze box they will play whatever instruments they can make. He agrees and Bill makes a machine to play for them, but the machine sounds horrible, so they ask the musician if he wishes to come with them and they can find an orchestra together.

- Episode 13 – "The Real Soldier"

Bill, Boadicea, Chad, and the musician walk over the downs. They meet a real soldier, who tells them that he is looking for one of his medals. Boadicea is impressed and asks how he got his medal. The soldier was a member of the Gallant 53rd assigned to an island to defend it from the ghastly Reginald Benbrisket. The president of the island makes a speech while the soldiers are having dinner. Reginald Benbrisket demands the instant surrender of the island, which he claims was left to him by his aunt Martha Grub. The president looks over the aunt's will and agrees she left the island to him but it was not hers to give. The soldier gets ready for the battle and takes a walk along the beach. He comes across a changing hut and decides to sleep under it. The soldier then hears someone coming out of the hut and it is Reginald Benbrisket, who goes for a swim, so the soldier nails up the back door. When Reginald Benbrisket returns, the soldier nails up the seaward door and pushes the hut into the sea. The soldier then tells how his medal is for saving Reginald Benbrisket from a watery grave, because it turns out that it was his island and is made the new president. Bill makes a machine which rakes the grass toward a magnet and it succeeds in finding the medal. The soldier joins the adventure.

- Episode 14 – "Basil Herbert"

While the adventurers are walking over the downs, Bill gets the feeling he is being followed. He goes to investigate and the ghastly Basil Herbert jumps out on him. He announces that he will join their orchestra as he can play several instruments. This gets Chad angry and he shouts no. Later, the ghastly Basil Herbert appears again and proceeds to play his clarinet, but Boadicea tells him to go away and Basil has a temper tantrum. Even later, Basil appears again, this time playing a violin. Bill goes into the forest and makes a strange musical instrument. Basil plays it and causes the yellow bird that is tied to the bowling ball to fly away, then the ball drops, hits a plank and fires Basil into the air and away from the gang forever.

- Episode 15 – "The Pilot"

Bill and his companions meet a crashed pilot who tells them that he and his wife are looking for a house. He had found the right place but when he made a dive to get closer to the house, his controls stuck and he crashed, destroying his plane and the house. He calls his wife over and she gets upset that they will never find their ideal home. Bill ties a balloon and pedals to the remains of the plane so that the pilot can continue his search and he flies off happily.

== Cast and crew ==
- Written by: Timothy Forder
- Narrated by: Peter Chelsom
- Produced by: Mary Swindale
- Directed by: Timothy Forder
- Edited by: Mike Murray
- Production co-ordinator: Steve Flack
- Assistant producer: Lorrie Horde-Brown
- Animation: Mike Davies
- Backgrounds: Denny Sutton
- Artwork: Hierographics
- Painting & tracing: Martin Dray
- Rostrum camera: Julian Hollaway & Bob Skeggs
- Sound: Trevor Barber
- Music: Barrie Guard
