= Adrianne Lobel =

American scenic designer and producer

- Born: December 10, 1955 (age 70); Brooklyn, New York, U.S.
- Occupations: Scenic designer; theatrical producer
- Years active: 1979-present
- Spouse: Mark Linn-Baker (m. 1995; div. 2009)
- Children: 1
- Relatives: Arnold Lobel (father); Anita Lobel (mother)

Adrianne Lobel (born December 10, 1955) is an American scenic designer and producer for theatre, opera, and dance known for her "very daring and creative sets."

== Life and career ==
Lobel was born and raised in Brooklyn and took classes at the art school at the Brooklyn Museum, then worked as a draftsman at film studios. She later attended the Yale Drama School, where she studied with set designer Ming Cho Lee.

Lobel has designed sets for Broadway, off-Broadway, and regional theater productions and has worked with the Yale Repertory Theatre, Arena Stage, and the Guthrie Theatre. She designed the sets for the 1987 Houston Grand Opera production of Nixon in China and the television broadcast the following year, as well as the 1991 PBS Great Performances: Dance in America staging of The Hard Nut by Mark Morris. Additionally, she designed the sets for the 2005 Metropolitan Opera adaptation of the Theodore Dreiser classic An American Tragedy directed by Francesca Zambello the 1988 Mark Morris Dance Group work "L'Allegro, il Penseroso ed il Moderato." and 1991 Mark Morris Dance Group work "The Hard Nut".

Lobel's first producing credit, the musical A Year With Frog and Toad, was a family affair (workshopped 2000, premiered 2002). It was based on books, Frog and Toad, by her late father, children's author Arnold Lobel, and starred her then-husband Mark Linn-Baker, to whom she was married from 1995 to 2009.

== Awards and nominations ==
Lobel was nominated for the Drama Desk Award for Outstanding Set Design for Passion and the Tony Award for Best Musical for A Year With Frog and Toad. She is the recipient of the 1984 Obie Award for Scenic Design for her contributions to All Night Long and The Vampires and the 1998 Lucille Lortel Award for Outstanding Scenic Design for On the Town.

== Other stage credits ==
- The King of Schnorrers (1979)
- A... My Name Is Alice (1983)
- My One and Only (1983)
- Passion (1994)
- Twelve Dreams (1995)
- The Diary of Anne Frank (1997)
- On the Town (1998)
- The Alchemist (2000)
- Little House on the Prairie (2008)

== Published works ==
- Small Sheep in a Pear Tree, written and illustrated by Lobel (Harper & Row, 1977)
- Danby and George, written by Betty Baker (Greenwillow Books, 1981)
- The Frogs and Toads All Sang, wr. and illus. by Arnold Lobel, color by Adrianne Lobel (HarperCollins, 2009) — featuring Frog and Toad
- Odd Owls & Stout Pigs, by Arnold Lobel, color by Adrianne Lobel (Harper, 2009) — nonsense rhymes
