= Harriet Ziefert =

American children's author (born 1941)

- Born: July 7, 1941 (age 85); North Bergen, New Jersey, U.S.
- Occupation: Author
- Writing career
- Genre: Children's literature

Harriet Ziefert (born July 7, 1941) is an American children's author. Ziefert was born in North Bergen, New Jersey. She has written several hundred children's books, including the Little Hippo series. Notable illustrators of her books include Emilie Boon and Santiago Cohen.

== Collaboration with Emilie Boon ==
=== Board books ===
Ziefert and Boon have made "board books" for preschoolers which are a combination game and book to help children learn. In Timothy's Numbers, the book is packaged with "stiff colored foam" numbers that children insert into specific slots in the book as the illustrated rabbit, Timothy, helps them count. There is another book, Timothy's Shapes, which helps children discern shapes. The book boards are a trend in children's book publishing to combine merchandise and books.

=== Little Hippo books ===
Ziefert and Boon have collaborated on a series of "Little Hippo" books, the first of which was published in 1988 by Viking Penguin. The books are written for children between 1 1/2 to 5 years-of-age. They are intended to help children deal with change, like the addition of a new baby to the family or moving to a new house. The hippo is drawn distinctively with stylized features, smudged outlines and light-gray coloring. In 1997, Boon saw a new series of "Little Hippo" books published by Scholastic, Inc. and claims that the characters are a take-off of her distinctive illustrations, use "Little Hippo" for its name and dress the hippo like hers. Further, Scholastic also sought to trademark the image of the hippo for a line of books. Some of the titles of the little hippo books are: "Daddy Can You Play With Me?" "Little Hippo's New Baby," "Little Hippo's New House," and "Mummy Where Are You?"

Boon later obtained an attorney, Seth Salinger, through the Boston non-profit, "Volunteer Lawyers for the Arts." In 1999, Salinger filed a suit on Boon's behalf in Boston's federal court against Scholastic. Chuck Wentzel, a spokesman for Scholastic spokesman said, "Scholastic believes, based on our investigation, there was no copying done and that we will be successful in the litigation."

On the 3rd of July, the court ruled that Boon failed to prove her case, and was ordered to pay £635 to Scholastic.

== Notable books ==
Illustrated by Emilie Boon

- Bear All Year (1986)
- Bear Gets Dressed (1986)
- Bear Goes Shopping (1986)
- Max and Diana and the Shopping Trip (1987)
- Daddy Can You Play With Me? (1988)
- Mommy Where Are You? (1988)
- My Clothes and My Food (1996)
- Benjy Bear's Halloween (1996)
- Benjy Bear's Christmas (1996)
- Timothy's Numbers (1996)
- Timothy's Shapes (1996)
- Little Hippo's New Baby (1997)
- Little Hippo's New House (1997)
- Little Hippo's New Friend (1999)
- Little Hippo's New School (1999)
- No Kiss for Grandpa (2001)
- Grandma, Where Are You? (2005)
- Grandpa, Will You Play With Me? (2005)
