= Minnie and Moo =

Children's picture book series

Minnie and Moo is a series of children's picture books by Denys Cazet. The series is about two cows that go on adventures. They are best friends and they live on a farm together. The series have been reviewed by major book reviewers such as Publishers Weekly, Kirkus Reviews, and Booklist.

== Books ==
- Minnie and Moo Meet Frankenswine

On a dark and stormy night, something in the barn glows. The scared animals think that it's a monster, Frankenswine's monster.

- Minnie and Moo: Will You Be My Valentine?

It's Valentine's Day and love is everywhere thanks to Minnie and Moo.

- Minnie and Moo Go To The Moon

Minnie and Moo dress up in clothes and act human. They take off on a tractor, and they think that they are on the moon when it stops.

- Minnie and Moo Go Dancing

Minnie thinks that people can dance because they have thumbs so they get dressed up and dance all night.

- Minnie and Moo and the Thanksgiving Tree

On Thanksgiving morning, the turkeys are nervous so the cows send them to hide in a tall oak tree.

- Minnie and Moo and the Musk of Zoro

Moo thinks about the old days when heroes like Zorro ruled the land. The two dress up as masked men.

- Minnie and Moo: The Night of the Living Bed

Minnie and Moo ride on a bed down the hill and they also go trick or treating.

- Minnie and Moo: The Attack of the Easter Bunnies

Minnie hears the farmer say that he can't be the Easter bunny this year, so the cows try to find a substitute so that the grandchildren will be happy.

- Minnie and Moo and the Haunted Sweater

It's the farmer's birthday and the cows decide to get him a present. They knit a sweater, but Elvis the chicken gets knitted right into the sweater.

- Minnie and Moo and the Potato from Planet X

Minnie and Moo are surprised by a package delivering alien that has one eye and looks like an alien. His name is Spud. He needs a new spaceship and five gallons of "space fuel" so that he can make a delivery.

- Minnie and Moo and the Seven Wonders of the World

Moo thinks that she heard the farmer talk about selling the farm. She gets the help of Minnie to carry out a fund-raising scheme so that they can get donations from other animals.

- Minnie and Moo Go to Paris

Minnie and Moo go on a bus that they think is for a world tour, but it is really for the neighborhood.

- Minnie and Moo Save the Earth

Minnie and Moo try to get rid of "space invaders".

- Minnie and Moo: The Case of the Missing Jelly Donut

Minnie thinks that her jelly donut was stolen and Moo tries to catch the thief.

- Minnie and Moo: The Night Before Christmas

The farmer forgets where he hid his grandchildren's presents.

- Minnie and Moo: Wanted, Dead or Alive

The cows dress up in clothes and go to the bank to ask for some money so that they can help out the farmer.
