= Frog and Toad All Year =

1976 children's book by Arnold Lobel

- First edition
- Author: Arnold Lobel
- Illustrator: Arnold Lobel
- Series: Frog and Toad
- Subject: Friendship
- Genre: Children's picture book, short story collection
- Publisher: Harper & Row (I Can Read)
- Publication date: August 1, 1976
- Publication place: United States
- Pages: 64 pp.
- ISBN: 9780060239503
- OCLC: 873644795
- LC Class: PZ7.L7795 Fq3
- Preceded by: Frog and Toad Together
- Followed by: Days With Frog and Toad

Frog and Toad All Year is an American picture book written and illustrated by Arnold Lobel, published by Harper & Row in 1976. It is the third book in the Frog and Toad series, whose four books completed by Lobel each comprises five easy-to-read short stories.

== Characters ==
The two friends, Frog and Toad, are portrayed by the author with human-like personalities and amphibian appearance. The situations in which they find themselves are a cross between the human and animal worlds. Along with Lobel's other Frog and Toad books, Frog and Toad All Year is valued by experts in children's literature for its portrayal of the value of friendship.

== Summary ==
Friends Frog and Toad, who have quite different personalities, have adventures through the seasons.

=== Down the Hill ===
Frog invites Toad to go sledding with him. While Toad does not want to, he is forced to join against his will. The trip doesn't go as planned after Frog falls off the sled as it goes out of control. Afterwards, Toad opts to continue spending Winter indoors.

=== The Corner ===
One rainy day in Frog's house, Frog recalls how he searched for Spring around various corners when he was very young, but found nothing. He eventually found it around the corner of his house. This prompts him and Toad to do another search around Frog's house after the rain clears.

=== Ice Cream ===
Toad finds himself in a sticky situation when he buys ice cream cones for himself and Frog one hot summer day. The ice cream pours over him, making him look like a monster that scares away nearby animals. He eventually falls into the lake, washing the ice cream. He and Frog buy new cones soon afterwards.

=== The Surprise ===
Frog and Toad secretly sneak out to rake the other's leaves, but an autumn wind gives the two an even bigger surprise.

=== Christmas Eve ===
Toad becomes concerned when Frog is late for their Christmas celebration, and considers some horrific possibilities, such as thinking that Frog either fell into a hole, got lost in the woods, or was attacked and possibly eaten by a coyote. Deciding to help, he finds a rope to get Frog out of the hole, a lantern to help Frog find his way out of the woods, and a frying pan to hit the coyote with to make its teeth fall out. Once outside, he finds Frog alive and well. It turns out Frog had simply taken some extra time to wrap a Christmas present. Once inside, Toad opens his present, which is a new clock to replace his broken old one. The two then spend the holiday together.

== Adaptations ==
The book has been adapted as a musical, written by Willie and Robert Reale and entitled A Year with Frog and Toad, opened on Broadway, and was also performed by the Second Story Repertory, by Children's Theatre Company in Minneapolis, and by the Chicago Children's Theatre, among others. The stories have also been produced as an audio book.

== Reception ==
Frog and Toad All Year won a Christopher Award in 1977. It is listed in The New York Times Parent's Guide to the Best Books for Children.

Kirkus Reviews wrote: "We miss some of the resonant psychological heft of this pair's previous experiences, but Frog and Toad can still transform the most ordinary seasonal activities into celebrations".
