= Santiago Cohen =

Latinx cartoonist, animator, illustrator, and fine artist

Santiago Cohen (born 1954) is a cartoonist, animator, illustrator, and fine artist based in Jersey City, New Jersey. He studied Communications design in the Metropolitan University in Mexico followed by a MFA in Pratt Institute.

Fantagraphics realised in 2025 Santiago Cohen's latest graphic novel "Secrets of a Lost Diary" Cohen illustrated the Latino graphic novel Angelitos by Ilan Stavans, which The New York Times listed among New and Noteworthy books in 2018. Cohen animated episodes of "Troubles the Cat" for The Cartoon Network and Children's Television Network. He also animated short films for children which aired on HBO and designed openers for the French TF! He has illustrated children's books for a wide-ranging of publishing companies, including Marshall Cavendish, Viking, GP Putnam, Zanner-Bloser, Houghton Mifflin, Warner, Golden Books, Zondervan, Chronicle, and Skypony. Among the Blue Apple children's books that he illustrated is "This is Passover".

Cohen has directed film animation for the Ink Tank, including: "Troubles the Cat" shorts for the Cartoon Network and Sesame Workshop; segments for HBO specials; bumpers for TELE-TV; and spots for The Long Island Savings Bank and Toys R' Us. He has also created three 15-second segments for Sesame Street. He designed the original Comedy Central logo. His graphic novel "The Fifth Name" received a grant from the Xeric Foundation. In 2014 he finished his Exvida Project, made of 1150 oil paintings telling his life in an ex-voto style.

He has been the artistic director the Day of the Dead Parade for the Jersey City since 2014.
