= Denys Cazet =

American writer

- Born: March 22, 1938 (age 88); Oakland, California, U.S.
- Occupations: Author, illustrator, educator
- Writing career
- Language: English
- Years active: 1980s–present
- Genre: Children's literature
- Notable works: Minnie and Moo series, The Perfect Pumpkin Pie

Denys Cazet (March 22, 1938), is a French-American illustrator and writer of at least 40 children's picture books, including the Minnie and Moo series for beginning readers.

== Biography ==
Cazet was born in Oakland, California and lives there with his family. Cazet taught at the elementary and middle school levels, served as president of the Napa Valley School Board and was credential school librarian of the Napa Valley School District in California.

Cazet says he grew up in an extended family, "a group of 25 adults, all French, from the old country". He recalls that his Uncle Felix would take him on walks, "and go on and on and on about philosophy". He says: "you know it was real funny because I had no clue what he was talking about. I was a child included in a very comforting and respecting family. I never felt left out."

== Selected works ==
- Are There Any Questions?
- The Attack of the Easter Bunnies
- Bob and Tom
- Born in the Gravy
- Christmas Moon
- Dancing
- Daydreams
- December 24th
- Elvis The Rooster Almost Goes To Heaven
- A Fish In His Pocket
- Frosted Glass
- Great-Uncle Felix
- Minnie and Moo series
- Mother Night
- Never Spit on Your Shoes
- Nothing At All
- The Perfect Pumpkin Pie
- Saturday
- Sunday
- Will You Read To Me?
