= Frog and Toad Are Friends =

1970 children's book by Arnold Lobel

Frog and Toad are Friends
- Front cover with Caldecott Honor seal
- Author: Arnold Lobel
- Illustrator: Arnold Lobel
- Series: Frog and Toad
- Genre: Children's picture book, short story collection
- Publisher: Harper & Row (I Can Read)
- Publication date: 1970
- Publication place: United States
- Pages: 64
- ISBN: 9780060239572
- OCLC: 97746
- LC Class: PZ7.L7795 Fr
- Followed by: Frog and Toad Together

Frog and Toad Are Friends is an American children's picture book, written and illustrated by Arnold Lobel and published by Harper & Row in 1970. It inaugurated the Frog and Toad series, whose four books each comprise five easy-to-read short stories.

== Summaries ==
=== Spring ===
Frog rushes over to Toad's house one fine spring morning in April, but Toad is not eager to get up. Frog eventually gets Toad up out of bed, and no sooner does he explain about the whole new year they will have together than Toad decides to go back to bed. Since Toad has slept since November, he asks Frog to come back to wake him up when it is half past May. Not wanting to be lonely until that time, Frog takes advantage of the fact that Toad has not changed his calendar since November and rips off the month pages until he reaches April, but rips off the April page as well and manages to get Toad out of bed to admire the beauty of Spring.

=== The Story ===
One summer day, Toad notices that Frog is not feeling well and helps him to bed. Frog requests a story, but Toad has difficulty trying to come up with a story to tell his friend. Walking up and down the porch, standing on his head, pouring water over his head, and banging his head against the wall fail to get Toad anywhere, but the latter makes him quite unwell. By then, however, Frog feels better and allows Toad to get in bed, so he can tell him a story. Frog tells a story detailing what Toad did for him throughout the chapter, but by the time Frog finishes, Toad is already fast asleep.

=== A Lost Button ===
Frog and Toad decide to go on a long walk. After they return, Toad notices a button has fallen off his jacket. Retracing their steps, the two return to the meadow, the woods, and the stream where they had walked. With assistance from a sparrow and a raccoon, Frog finds five buttons, but none of them are Toad's missing button, which was a big, round, thick, white button with four holes. Eventually, Toad gets so angry over not finding his button that he runs home and discovers his missing button had fallen off before the walk. To make it up to Frog for the wild goose chase, not only does Toad sew his button back on his jacket, but sews on the other buttons they found as well and gives it to Frog the next day.

=== A Swim ===
Frog and Toad go down to the stream to go swimming. Toad goes behind a rock to change into his bathing suit, but tells Frog, who opts not to wear a bathing suit to swim, not to look at him until he is in the water because he is sensitive about how he looks in his bathing suit. Frog agrees and the two go for their swim. A turtle comes by, prompting Toad to ask Frog to tell the turtle to leave, but even though Frog explains the situation, the turtle, plus some lizards, a grass snake, a pair of dragonflies, and a field mouse, all become curious to see Toad's bathing suit. Toad decides to stay in the water until everybody leaves, but eventually he has to come out when he begins to shiver and sneeze. As soon as he gets out, everyone (including Frog) laughs at him. Toad agrees that he looks funny, and he quietly picks up his clothes and goes home.

=== The Letter ===
While coming by Toad's house for a friendly visit, Frog notices Toad looking sad. Toad explains that it is the time when he has to wait for the mail because he never gets any mail. Feeling sad for his friend, Frog goes home, writes a letter addressed to Toad, and asks a snail to deliver the letter to Toad's house. Returning to Toad's house, Frog tries to convince Toad to try again at waiting for the mail, but ends up waiting for it himself. When Toad asks why, Frog mentions the letter and describes what he wrote in it, which cheers up Toad enough to wait for the letter. It takes four days for the snail to reach Toad's house, but he eventually arrives with Toad's letter, and Toad is very happy to know that receiving the letter was worth the wait.

== Reception ==
Kirkus Reviews stated that Frog and Toad are Friends "(does) for friendship something of what Little Bear does for kinship".

It was a Caldecott Honor book, which recognizes the year's best illustration in an American children's picture book, and was a finalist for the 1980 National Book Award for Children's Books in the paperback category.

School Library Journal included the book at #15 on their "Top 100 Picture Books" list in 2012.

== Adaptation ==
Frog and Toad Are Friends was adapted as a film by Churchill Films with Will Ryan and Hal Smith providing the voices of Frog and Toad with Lobel narrating. It received a CINE Golden Eagle.
