= Frog and Toad Together =

1972 children's book by Arnold Lobel

- First edition
- Author: Arnold Lobel
- Illustrator: Arnold Lobel
- Series: Frog and Toad
- Subject: Friendship
- Genre: Children's picture book, short story collection
- Publisher: Harper & Row (I Can Read)
- Publication date: April 1972
- Publication place: United States
- Pages: 64 pp.
- ISBN: 9780060239602
- OCLC: 436317436
- LC Class: PZ10.3.L787 Fr
- Preceded by: Frog and Toad Are Friends
- Followed by: Frog and Toad All Year

Frog and Toad Together is an American children's picture book, written and illustrated by Arnold Lobel and published by Harper & Row in 1972. It is the second book in the Frog and Toad series. Like each of the other books in the series, it contains five easy-to-read short stories.

== Summaries ==
=== A List ===
Toad writes a list of activities for himself and Frog for the day, but after a strong wind blows the list away during a hike, the two spend the rest of the day trying to remember what the rest of the activities were. At night, Toad remembers the final one was "Go to sleep" and the two do so, now content.

=== The Garden ===
Toad admires Frog's garden, and wishes to grow one of his own. After expending considerable effort to grow his seeds without success, Toad almost gives up. At the end, he realizes that they are finally starting to sprout; Toad agrees that gardening is hard work.

=== Cookies ===
Frog and Toad indulge in some home-baked cookies, but decide to use will-power to resist eating too many. Eventually they take it too far, by feeding the remainder of them to the birds. Toad opts to not worry so much about willpower, and goes home to bake a cake.

=== Dragons and Giants ===
After reading some adventurous stories, Frog and Toad embark on an adventure of their own by climbing a large mountain. Encountering several dangers along the way, such as a snake, an avalanche, and a hawk, they return home in fear and hide; Frog hides in the closet and Toad hides under the covers, still commending each other for their bravery.

=== The Dream ===
Toad is a performer known as "The Great Toad". He performs to an audience consisting solely of Frog, doing such feats as walking a high wire and asking if Frog can do, which he cannot. After each feat, however, Frog gradually shrinks until he is microscopic, much to Toad's horror. He silences the announcer and desperately tries to find Frog, saying he will be lonely without him. He awakens and then sees Frog unharmed, relieved that he had only been in a nightmare.

== Reception ==
Frog and Toad Together was a Newbery Honor Book, or runner-up for the American Library Association Newbery Medal, which recognizes the year's "most distinguished contribution to American literature for children".

== Adaptations ==
Frog and Toad Together was adapted into a film with Will Ryan and Hal Smith providing the voices of Frog and Toad. The first story, "A List", is not included.
