= John Clark Matthews =

John Clark Matthews is an American film director known for his work with stop motion animation.

== Filmography ==
=== Director ===
- Not-So-Rotten Ralph (1996)
- Rotten Ralph (1996)
- Pocahontas: The Girl Who Lived in Two Worlds (1995)
- Three Little Pigs Sing a Gig (1994)
- Goldilocks and the Three Bears Sing Their Little Bitty Hearts Out (1994)
- Mouse Soup (1993)
- Uncle Elephant (1991)
- Stanley and the Dinosaurs (1990)
- Morris Goes to School (1989)
- Frog and Toad Together (1987)
- Frog and Toad Are Friends (1985)
- Curious George (1984)
- The Adventures of Curious George (1982)
- Curious George (1980)
