= The Voyagers: Being Legends and Romances of Atlantic Discovery =

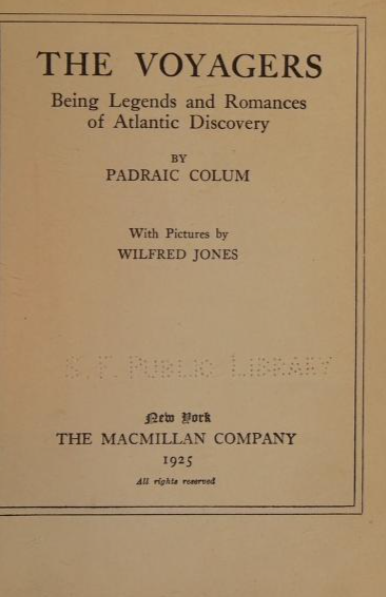
- Title page for The Voyagers: Being Legends and Romances of Atlantic Discovery (1925)
- Author: Padraic Colum
- Illustrator: Wildred Jones
- Language: English
- Genre: Children's literature / Exploration
- Publisher: Macmillan
- Publication date: 1925
- Publication place: United States

Vignette from the 1925 edition

The Voyagers: Being Legends and Romances of Atlantic Discovery is a 1925 children's book written by Padraic Colum and illustrated by Wilfred Jones. It is a collection of legendary and historical stories about Atlantic exploration, from the story of Atlantis to the naming of America. The titular voyagers are Maelduin, Saint Brendan, the children of Eric the Red, Christopher Columbus, Ponce de Leon, colonists of Virginia, and Amerigo Vespucci. Their stories are told within a framing sequence of Henry the Navigator's interest in exploration.

The book was a Newbery Honor recipient in 1926, Colum's second honor after The Golden Fleece and the Heroes Who Lived Before Achilles in 1922.

== Stories ==
- The Tower Above the Ocean
- The Legend of Atlantis
- The Voyage of Maelduin
- The Voyage of Saint Brendan
- The Children of Eric the Red
- On the Tower
- The Great Admiral
- The Fountain of Youth
- Virginia
- The Naming of the Land
