= The Railroad to Freedom =

1932 book by Hildegarde Swift

The Railroad to Freedom: A Story of the Civil War
- Author: Hildegarde Swift
- Illustrator: James Daugherty
- Language: English
- Genre: Children's literature / historical fiction
- Publisher: Harcourt
- Publication date: 1932
- Publication place: United States

The Railroad to Freedom: A Story of the Civil War is a 1932 children's historical fiction book written by Hildegarde Swift and illustrated by James Daugherty. It is a fictionalized biography of Araminta Ross (later known as Harriet Tubman) from 1833 to the end of the U.S. Civil War, covering her early life as a slave and her later work on the Underground Railroad. The book earned a Newbery Honor in 1933, Hildegard's second Honor after Little Blacknose in 1929.
