= What Hearts =

1992 novel by Bruce Brooks

- Author: Bruce Brooks
- Language: English
- Genre: Children's literature
- Publication date: October 1, 1992
- Publication place: United States
- Awards: John Newbery Medal

What Hearts (1992) is a 1992 Newbery Honor-winning children's novel by Bruce Brooks. It contains four interrelated stories about a 12-year-old boy, Asa, who faces different challenges through stages of his childhood.

== Plot ==
The book tells four stories of Asa's childhood. When Asa comes home with straight A's and hand-grown radishes in the first grade, he learns that his parents are getting a divorce. He moves with his mother to meet her boyfriend Dave, with whom he does not get along, due to Dave's being mean to him. They move to North Carolina to Dave's home. In the second story, he is in the fourth grade where he makes a lot of friends. His mother is now married to Dave, but Asa has difficulty accepting Dave as his stepfather. One day at school, Asa is assigned to recite a poem called "Little Blue Boy" with his friend Joel. He does not like the poem, so he plans to recite "The Highwayman." Joel agrees to recite the longer, more difficult poem. At first, Joel is excited, but he has difficulty remembering the lines. Joel's mother and Asa agree on Asa's reciting the poem alone while Joel's mother takes him away, unaware of Asa's solo recitation. Joel shows up on the day of the recital, and Asa, for sake of his friendship, switches back to "Little Blue Boy," which Joel remembers perfectly.

Another turning point takes place when Asa is eleven. He tries out for Little League Baseball after practicing with his stepfather and his mother for weeks. A day before his tryout, his mother has an accident with pills. It is later revealed that his mother is suffering from depression. The family moves to Raleigh, and Asa misses his chance to play baseball.

In the fourth story, Asa is in love with Jean, his classmate since the fifth grade whom he finally befriends in the seventh grade. Asa confesses his love to Jean and just as he reaches home that day, he learns that he and his mother are moving, due to his mother's separation from Dave. The next day, Jean confesses her love to Asa by giving him two candy hearts that say "I love you, I love you," only to find out that Asa would no longer be with her. Asa later calls Jean on the phone but Jean pretends as if nothing has happened between them. When Asa mentions the heart candies, Jean asks, "What Hearts?" Asa realizes the world is ever changing, and that he has to learn to adjust with it.

== Characters ==
Asa: Asa is the main character, going through different turning points as he learns to move with the changes.

Asa's Mother: Asa's mother has a difficult relationship with Asa's father, and later with Dave, Asa's stepfather. She falls into depression because of this.

Dave: Dave is Asa's mother's childhood sweetheart, whom she marries after divorcing Asa's father. Dave is mean and does not like his stepson Asa.

Joel: Joel is Asa's friend in the fourth grade.

Jean: Jean is Asa's love interest from the fifth grade, to whom he finally confesses his feelings in the seventh grade.

== Awards ==
1993 Newbery Honor 1993 ALA Notable Books for Children 1993 Best Books for Young Adults (ALA) 1993 (The Horn Book) Fanfare Honor List 1993 Teachers' Choices (IRA) 1993 Books for the Teen Age (NY Public Library)

== Critical reception ==
What Hearts received positive responses from critics. Publishers Weekly claimed, "Effectively revealing the psychological burdens of an intelligent, sensitive child, this book remains honest and intense from beginning to end." Horn Book Magazine reports that the book is "Original in structure and subtle in scope."
