= The Noonday Friends =

1965 children's book

- Title page for The Noonday Friends (1965)
- Author: Mary Stolz
- Language: English
- Genre: Children's literature
- Publisher: Harper
- Publication date: 1975
- Publication place: United States

The Noonday Friends is a 1965 children's book by Mary Stolz. Set in Greenwich Village in the 1960s, it follows the friendship of two young girls, Franny Davis and Simone Orgella, who can only meet during lunchtime, and the struggles of their respective families. It was a Newbery Honor book in 1966.

== Reception ==
Despite earning a Newbery Honor, the New York Times review at release was less impressed, saying, "Because the author is a superior craftsman this is an attractive and readable book. But, with unconvincing characterization and a story line that often falters, the book is not Mary Stolz at her best".
