= The Dark Star of Itza =

1930 children's novel by Alida Malkus

The Dark Star of Itza: The Story of a Pagan Princess
- Author: Alida Malkus
- Illustrator: Lowell D. Houser
- Language: English
- Genre: Children's literature
- Publisher: Harcourt
- Publication date: 1930
- Publication place: United States

The Dark Star of Itza: The Story of a Pagan Princess is a 1930 children's historical novel written by Alida Malkus and illustrated by Lowell D. Houser. It portrays the way of life of a Mayan princess, Nicte, in 14th century Chichen Itza. The novel was a Newbery Honor recipient in 1931.
