= Alida Malkus =

American novelist

Alida Sims Malkus
- Born: Lyda Sims Malkus; September 19, 1888; Genesee River valley, New York
- Died: September 27, 1976 (aged 88); Concord, Massachusetts, US
- Occupation: Children's writer
- Writing career
- Genres: Children's literature, mainly historical fiction
- Subject: Geography

Alida Sims Malkus (September 19, 1888 – September 27, 1976) was an American writer of children's books, primarily nonfiction and historical novels "insubstantially tinged with fantasy". She was a Newbery Honor winner.

== Biography ==
Born September 19, 1888, Malkus was the eleventh child out of thirteen living in Bay City, Michigan, and spent most of her time swimming and riding horses for entertainment. During high school at the age of thirteen she wrote articles for the school newspaper, she also wrote plays and enjoyed putting on productions for her neighborhood friends. Two years later, her mother was not well and had to move to San Francisco. During her trip she fell deeply in love with the desert and decided to live in New Mexico, where she spent a great deal of time with the Native Americans living in the region. This is where she developed her interest in Southwest Native Americans, Mayan ruins and other pre-Columbian civilizations which inspired most of her books.

Malkus was the mother of MIT professor Willem Malkus.

The Dark Star of Itza: The Story of a Pagan Princess was one runner-up for the 1931 Newbery Medal.

== Works ==
- Raquel of the Ranch Country (1927)
- The Dragon Fly of Zuñi (1928)
- Timber Line (1929)
- The Dark Star of Itza: The Story of a Pagan Princess, illustrated by Lowell Houser (1930)
- The Spindle Imp and Other Tales of Maya Myth and Folk Lore, illus. Erick Berry (1931), LCCN 31-22896
- Eastward Sweeps the Current: A Saga of the Polynesian Seafarers (1937)
- The Silver Llama (1939)
- The Citadel of a Hundred Stairways (1941)
- Constancia Lona (1947)
- The Story of Louis Pasteur (1952)
- The Story of Good Queen Bess (1953)
- We Were There at the Battle of Gettysburg (1955)
- The Story of Winston Churchill (1957)
- Young Inca Prince (1957)
- The Sea and Its Rivers (1957)
- Through the Wall (1962)
- There Really Was a Hiawatha (1963)
- Animals of the High Andes (1966)
- The Story of Jacqueline Kennedy (1967)
- The Amazon: River of Promise (1970)
