= Eloise Lownsbery =

American writer

- Born: April 16, 1888; Paw Paw, Illinois, U.S.
- Died: November 1, 1967 (aged 79)
- Occupation: Writer
- Writing career
- Genre: Children's Literature
- Notable work: Out of the Flame
- Notable awards: Newbery Honor; 1932

Eloise Lownsbery (April 16, 1888 – November 1, 1967) was the recipient of a Newbery Honor in 1932, for her book Out of the Flame. Lownsbey was raised in Paw Paw, Illinois by her parents, Alexander W. and Martha Fisher Lownsbery. She obtained her B.A. degree in 1911 at Wellesley College in Wellesley, Massachusetts, and continued on to publish her first book The Boy Knight of Reims.
