= The Wrong Way Home (novel) =

2024 children's book by Kate O'Shaughnessy

- Author: Kate O'Shaughnessy
- Cover artist: Shelley Couvillion
- Language: English
- Genre: Children's literature
- Publisher: Knopf
- Publication date: April 2, 2024
- Publication place: United States
- Pages: 336
- ISBN: 9780593650738

The Wrong Way Home is a 2024 children's novel written by American author Kate O'Shaughnessy. 12-year-old Fern lives with her mother in a doomsday commune, The Ranch, in upstate New York run by Dr. Ben, who espouses beliefs like no using technology, avoiding processed food and synthetic fabrics, and predicts upheaval from climate change. As Fern prepares for a rite of passage, her mother and Fern flee from the commune in the night, settling in California. Fern's mother gets a job at a motel, and Fern starts attending school, making new friends, all the while secretly planning to contact Dr. Ben so he can bring them back. As time passes away from the Ranch, however, Fern begins to question the teachings of Dr. Ben.

== Reception ==
The book earned a Newbery Honor in 2025, was named one of Kirkus Reviews Best Middle Grade of the Year books, and Booklist's Best Book of the Year list. Critics appreciated the realatability of Fern, the relationship between Fern and her mother, and the realistic portrayal of a teenager chafing against the authority figures in her life.
