= The Fearsome Inn =

1967 children's book

- Author: Isaac Bashevis Singer
- Illustrator: Nonny Hogrogian
- Language: English
- Genre: Children's literature /Children's fantasy
- Publisher: Scribener
- Publication date: 1975
- Publication place: London

The Fearsome Inn is a 1967 children's fantasy novel written by Isaac Bashevis Singer and illustrated by Nonny Hogrogian. Set in rural Poland, three young women are forced to work at the titular inn as servants for the witch Doboshova and her half-man, half-devil husband Lapitut, who hex and torture travelers. One night, three young men arrive at the inn and are forced to protect themselves from the witchcraft of Doboshova and her husband. It is Singer's second book for children and second Newbery Honor book (1968), following Zlateh the Goat and Other Stories which was honored in 1967.
