= The Undead Fox of Deadwood Forest =

2025 children's novel

- Author: Aubrey Hartman
- Illustrator: Marcin Minor
- Language: English
- Genre: Children's fantasy
- Publisher: Little, Brown and Company
- Publication date: February 25, 2025
- Publication place: United States
- Media type: Hardcover
- Pages: 320
- ISBN: 9780316575720

The Undead Fox of Deadwood Forest is a 2025 children's fantasy novel written by Aubrey Hartman and illustrated by Marcin Minor.

== Plot ==
Clare, a fox, lives in the titular forest, where he serves as a spirit guide for other animals, ushering them to one of four afterlives: Peace, Pleasure, Progress, or Pain. Clare's duties are thrown into disarray upon the arrival of Gingersnipes, a badger, as he struggles to place her into the correct afterlife. Searching for answers, Clare seeks out Hesterfowl, the guide for nearby Fernlight Forest, and Clare realizes he is being replaced.

== Reception ==
The book earned a Newbery Honor in 2026. Kirkus Reviews called the book "heartbreaking, marvelously funny, and generously redemptive", and the School Library Journal called the prose and imagery in the book beautiful. Publishers Weekly complimented Minor's "whimsical" illustrations.
