= Fighting Words (novel) =

2020 young adult novel about foster children and their struggles

- Author: Kimberly Brubaker Bradley
- Language: English
- Publisher: Dial Books
- Publication date: 2020
- Publication place: United States
- Pages: 269
- ISBN: 978-1-9848-1568-2

Fighting Words is a 2020 young adult novel written by Kimberly Brubaker Bradley. The story follows sisters Delicious "Della" Nevaeh Roberts and Suki as they process traumas stemming from their mother's drug addiction and imprisonment, Della's sexual assault at the hands of their mother's boyfriend, Suki's suicide attempt, and their lives in foster care. The book earned a Newbery Honor in 2021, Bradley's second.
