= One Big Open Sky =

2024 children's book by Lesa Cline-Ransome

- Author: Lesa Cline-Ransome
- Language: English
- Genre: Children's literature / historical fiction
- Publisher: Holiday House
- Publication date: Aug 19, 2025
- Publication place: United States
- Media type: Hardcover
- Pages: 304
- ISBN: 978-0-8234-5016-9

One Big Open Sky is a 2024 children's historical fiction novel written in verse by Lesa Cline-Ransome. Set in 1879 and told through the narratives of three women, young girl Lettie, Lettie's mother Sylvia, and traveler Philomena, it follows Lettie and her family as they relocate from Mississippi to Nebraska. Lettie's father, Thomas, is convinced that life in Nebraska will be better, as the family will no longer have to work on land owned by whites and can own their own land; Lettie's pregnant mother, Sylvia, is apprehensive about leaving their community in Mississippi behind. In Missouri, Philomena, an orphan hired to be the new teacher in North Platte, Nebraska, joins the family, offering her services as cook and washerwoman. As the group sets out on their journey, they're forced to brave the perils of the frontier and endure personal tragedies.

== Reception ==
The book earned a Coretta Scott King Award honor and a Newbery Honor in 2024. The School Library Journal praised Cline-Ransome's use of the three narrators, saying they added "depth and breadth to the storyline and character growth". Publishers Weekly's review was also positive but offered a small criticism, saying the three narratives eventually became repetitive. Kirkus Reviews, which named the book to its best of the year list, singled out the book for its "unique depiction of African American homesteaders".
