= Nora Burglon =

American author

Nora Buglon
- Born: April 28, 1896; Minnesota, U.S.
- Died: 1976
- Occupations: Author, Teacher, and World Traveler
- Writing career
- Genre: Children's Literature
- Notable work: Children of the Soil: A Story of Scandinavia
- Notable awards: Newbery Medal; 1933

Nora Burglon (born April 28, 1896 in Minnesota, died 1976) was an American author of children's literature. She grew up in an Amish community and in 1933, was nominated for the Newbery Medal.

== Bibliography ==
- Children of the Soil: A Story of Scandinavia (1933)
- Ghost Ship: A Story of Norway (1936)
- The Gates Swing In: A Story of Sweden (1937)
- Sticks Across the Chimney: A Story of Denmark (1938)
- Deep Silver: A Story of the Cod Banks (1938)
- Lost Island (1939)
- The Cuckoo Calls: A Story of Finland (1940)
- Around the Caribbean (1941)
- Shark Hole (1943)
- Slave Girl (1947)
- Christmas: A book of the Stories Old and New (1948)
- A Christmas Medley (1983)
- Diego Wins, and Other Caribbean Stories
