= Newbery Medal =

American children's literary award

- Awarded for: "The most distinguished contribution to American literature for children"
- Country: United States
- Presented by: Association for Library Service to Children, a division of the American Library Association
- First award: 1922; 104 years ago
- Currently held by: Renée Watson, All the Blues in the Sky
- Website: ala.org/alsc/newbery

The John Newbery Medal, frequently shortened to the Newbery, is a literary award given by the Association for Library Service to Children (ALSC), a division of the American Library Association (ALA), to the author of "the most distinguished contributions to American literature for children". The Newbery and the Caldecott Medal are considered the two most prestigious awards for children's literature in the United States. Books selected are often recognized and popular to the point of being widely carried by bookstores and libraries, the authors are often interviewed on television, and master's theses and doctoral dissertations have been written on winning works. Named for John Newbery, an 18th-century English publisher of juvenile books, the winner of the Newbery is selected at the ALA's Midwinter Conference by a fifteen-person committee. The Newbery was proposed by Frederic G. Melcher in 1921, making it the first children's book award in the world. The physical bronze medal was designed by Rene Paul Chambellan and is given to the winning author at the next ALA annual conference. Since its founding there have been several changes to the composition of the selection committee, while the physical medal remains the same.

Besides the Newbery Medal, the committee awards a variable number of citations to leading contenders, called Newbery Honors or Newbery Honor Books; until 1971, these books were called runners-up. As few as zero and as many as eight have been named, but from 1938 the number of Honors or runners-up has been one to five. To be eligible, a book must be written by a United States citizen or resident and must be published first or simultaneously in the United States in English during the preceding year. Seven authors have won two Newbery Medals each, several have won both a Medal and Honor, while a larger number of authors have won multiple Honors, with Laura Ingalls Wilder having won five Honors without ever winning the Medal.

== History ==
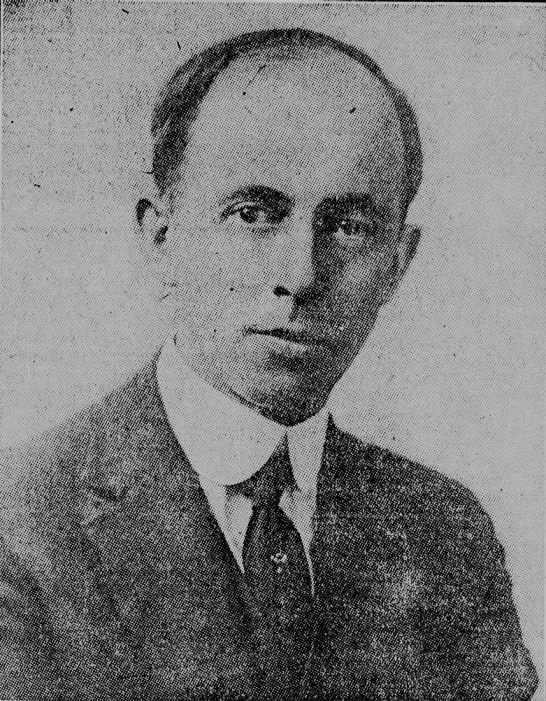
Frederic G. Melcher first proposed the idea for the Newbery Award.

The Newbery Medal was established on June 22, 1921, at the annual conference of the American Library Association (ALA). Proposed by Publishers Weekly editor Frederic G. Melcher, the proposal was well received by the children's librarians present and then approved by the ALA Executive Board. The award was administered by the ALA from the start, but Melcher provided funds that paid for the design and production of the medal. The Newbery Medal was inaugurated in 1922, considering books published in 1921. (Note: In retrospect it is officially dated 1922 and that convention is followed here.) According to The Newbery and Caldecott Awards Melcher and the ALA Board agreed to establish the award for several reasons that related to children's librarians. They wanted to encourage quality, creative children's books and to demonstrate to the public that children's books deserve recognition and praise. In 1932 the committee felt it was important to encourage new writers in the field, so a rule was made that an author would win a second Newbery only if the vote was unanimous. The rule was in place until 1958. Joseph Krumgold became the first winner of a second Newbery in 1960. Another change, in 1963, made it clear that joint authors of a book were eligible for the award. Several more revisions and clarifications were added in the 1970s and 1980s. Significantly in 1971, the term Newbery Honor was introduced. Runners-up had been identified annually from the start, with a few exceptions only during the 1920s; all those runners-up were named Newbery Honor Books retroactively.

=== Medal ===
The physical medal was designed by Rene Paul Chambellan and depicts an author giving his work (a book) to a boy and a girl to read on one side and on the other side the inscription, "For the most distinguished contribution to American literature for children". The bronze medal retains the name "Children's Librarians' Section", the original group responsible for awarding the medal, despite the sponsoring committee having changed names four times and now including both school and public librarians. Each winning author gets their own copy of the medal with their name engraved on it. Currently the Association for Library Service to Children (ALSC) is responsible for the award.

=== Committee ===
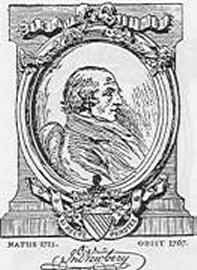
John Newbery, called "The Father of Children's Literature", was an English publisher of books who first made children's literature a sustainable and profitable part of the literary market.

As Barbara Elleman explained in The Newbery and Caldecott Awards, the original Newbery was based on votes by a selected jury of Children's Librarian Section officers. Books were first nominated by any librarian, then the jury voted for one favorite. Hendrik van Loon's non-fiction history book The Story of Mankind won with 163 votes out of 212. In 1924 the process was changed, and instead of using popular vote it was decided that a special award committee would be formed to select the winner. The award committee was made up of the Children's Librarian Section executive board, their book evaluation committee and three members at large. In 1929 it was changed again to the four officers, the chairs of the standing committees and the ex-president. Nominations were still taken from members at large.

In 1937 the American Library Association added the Caldecott Award, for "the artist of the most distinguished American picture book for children published in the United States". That year an award committee selected the Medal and Honor books for both awards. In 1978 the rules were changed and two committees were formed of fifteen people each, one for each award. A new committee is formed every year, with "eight elected, six appointed, and one appointed Chair". The Newbery Medal was named for eighteenth-century British bookseller John Newbery. It is awarded annually by the Association for Library Service to Children, a division of the American Library Association, to the author of the most distinguished contribution to American literature for children.

== Selection process ==
Committee members are chosen to represent a wide variety of libraries, teachers and book reviewers. They read the books on their own time, then meet twice a year for closed discussions. Any book that qualifies is eligible; it does not have to have been nominated. The Newbery is given to the "author of the most distinguished contribution to American literature for children published by an American publisher in the United States in English during the preceding year." Newbery winners are announced at the Midwinter Meeting of the American Library Association, held in January or February. The Honor Books must be a subset of the runners-up on the final ballot, either the leading runners-up on that ballot or the leaders on one further ballot that excludes the winner. The results of the committee vote are kept secret, and winners are notified by phone shortly before the award is announced. In 2015, K. T. Horning of the University of Wisconsin–Madison's Cooperative Children's Book Center proposed to ALSC that old discussions of the Newbery and Caldecott be made public in the service of researchers and historians. This proposal was met with both support and criticism by former committee members and recognized authors.

== Criticism ==
In October 2008, Anita Silvey, a children's literary expert, published an article in the School Library Journal criticizing the committee for choosing books that are too difficult for children. Lucy Calkins, of the Reading and Writing Project at Columbia University's Teachers College, agreed with Silvey: "I can't help but believe that thousands, even millions, more children would grow up reading if the Newbery committee aimed to spotlight books that are deep and beautiful and irresistible to kids". Then-ALSC President Pat Scales responded, "the criterion has never been popularity. It is about literary quality. How many adults have read all the Pulitzer Prize-winning books and... liked every one?" John Beach, associate professor of literacy education at St. John's University in New York, compared the books that adults choose for children with the books that children choose for themselves and found that in the 30 years before 2008 there was only a five percent overlap between the Children's Choice Awards (International Reading Association) and the Notable Children's Books list (American Library Association). He has also stated that "the Newbery has probably done far more to turn kids off to reading than any other book award in children's publishing."

== Recipients ==
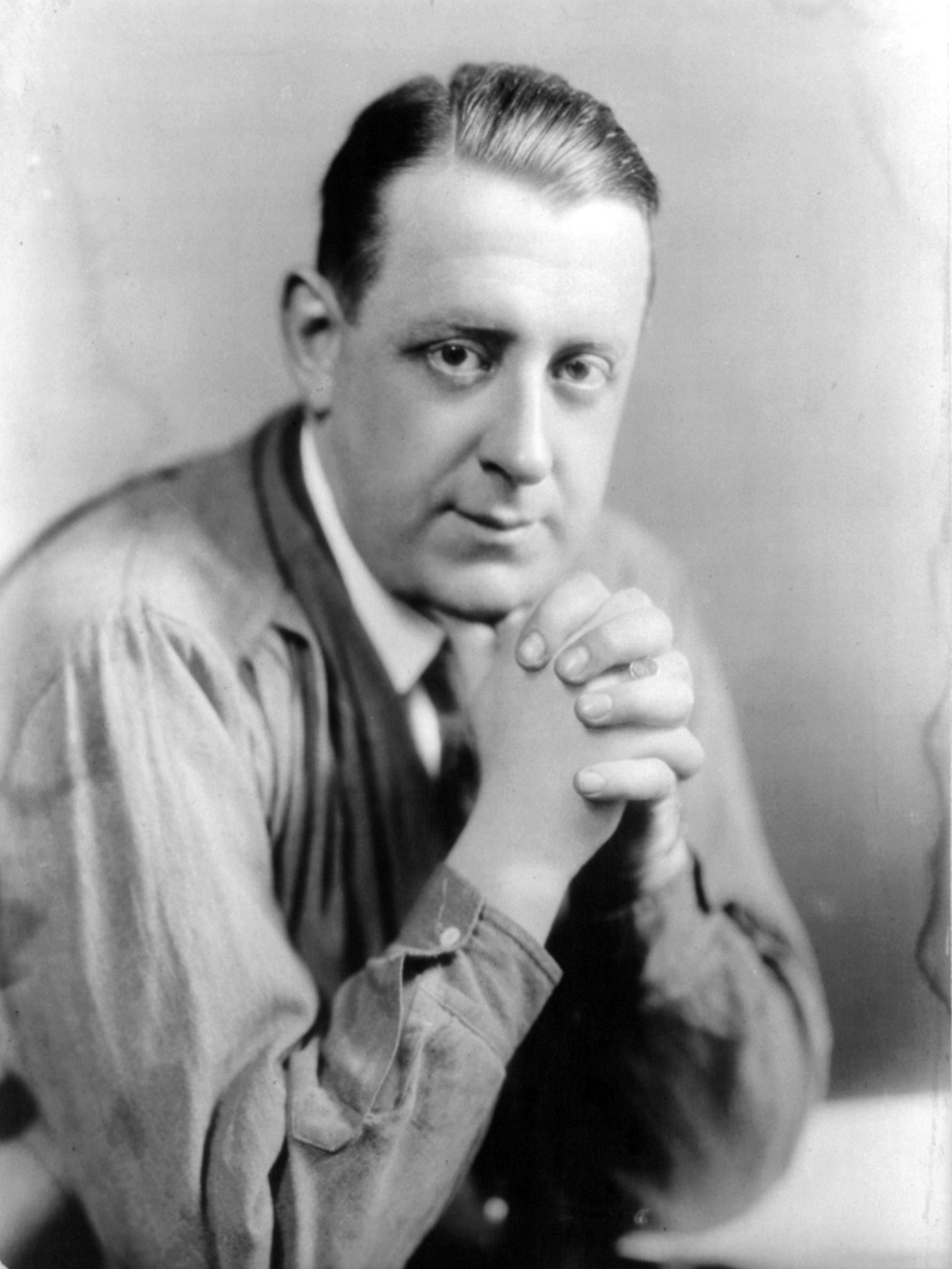
Hendrik Willem van Loon won the first Newbery Medal in 1922 for his book The Story of Mankind.

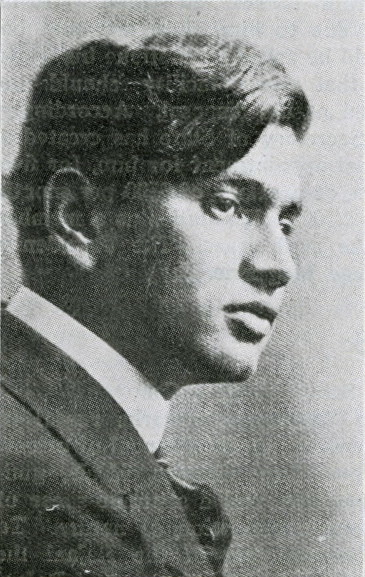
Dhan Gopal Mukerji was the first Indian American to win the Newbery Medal.

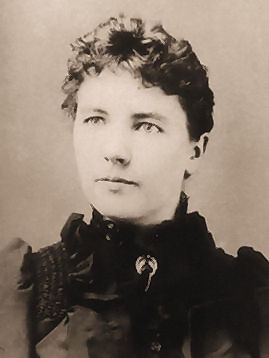
Laura Ingalls Wilder wrote five books each named a Newbery Honor between 1938 and 1944.

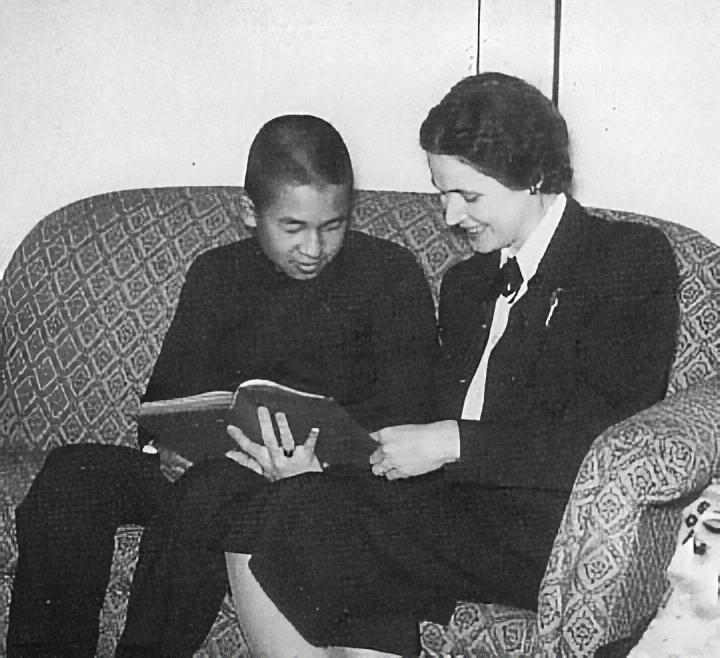
Elizabeth Gray Vining (right) won the Newbery Medal in 1943 for Adam of the Road, which was illustrated by Robert Lawson, who won the Newbery Medal himself in 1945.

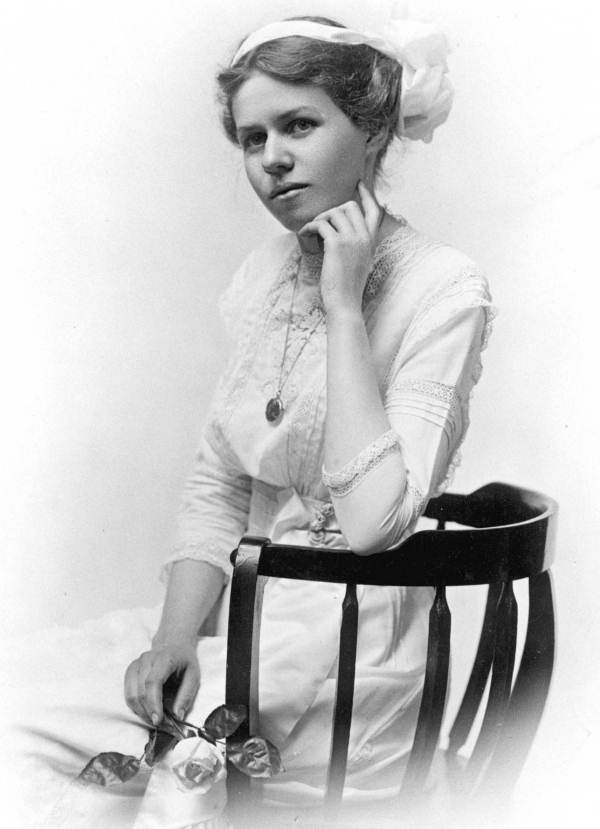
Lois Lenski, who won two Newbery Honors and one Newbery Medal, wrote series that were connected by themes rather than characters.

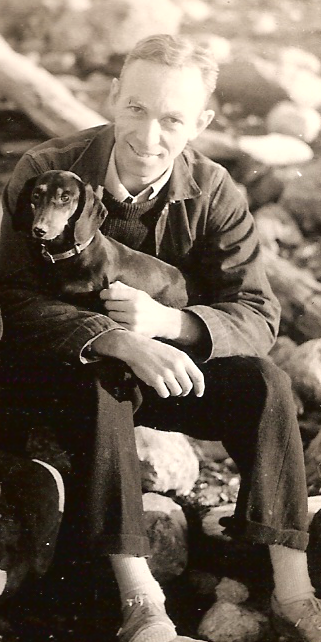
E. B. White won a Newbery Honor for Charlotte's Web for which he also recorded an unabridged audiobook.

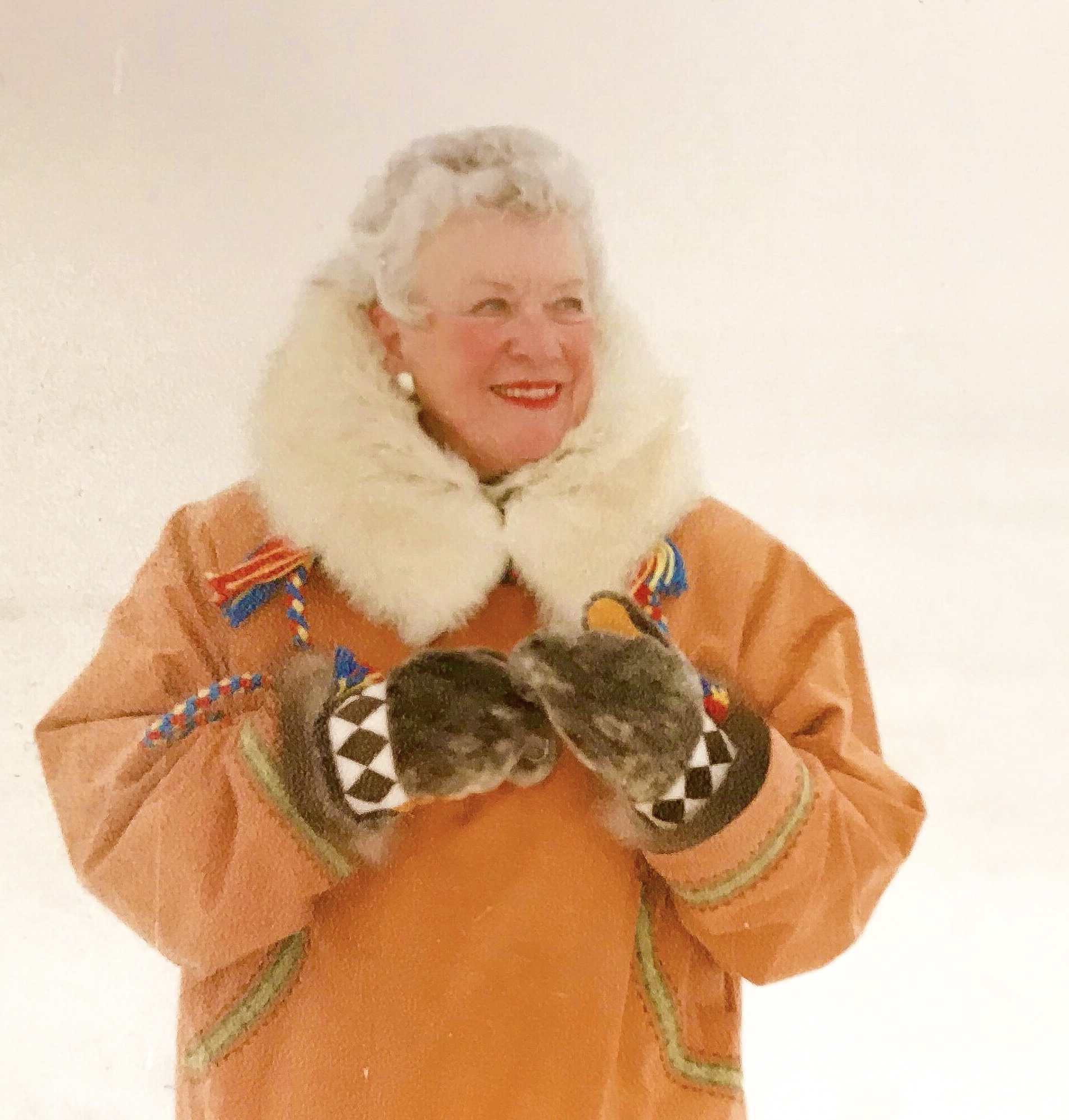
Jean Craighead George won both a Newbery Medal and Honor.

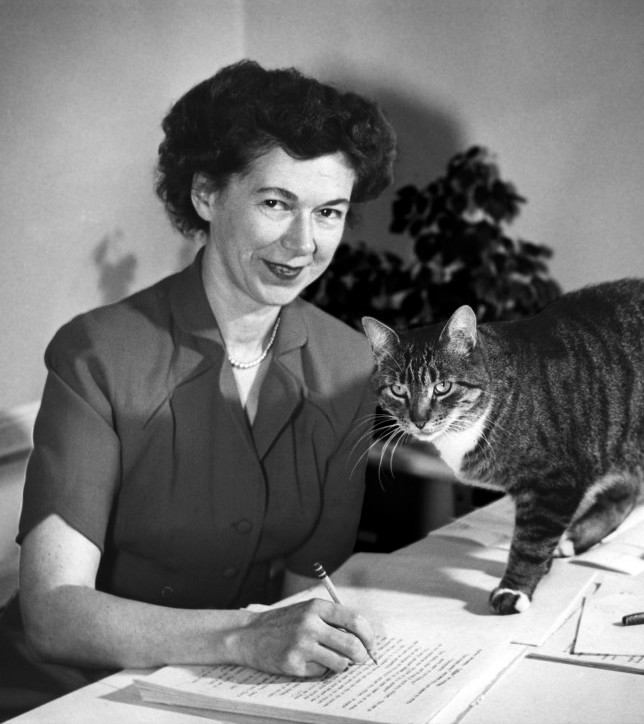
Beverly Cleary won two Newbery Honors for her Ramona series and the Medal for Dear Mr. Henshaw.

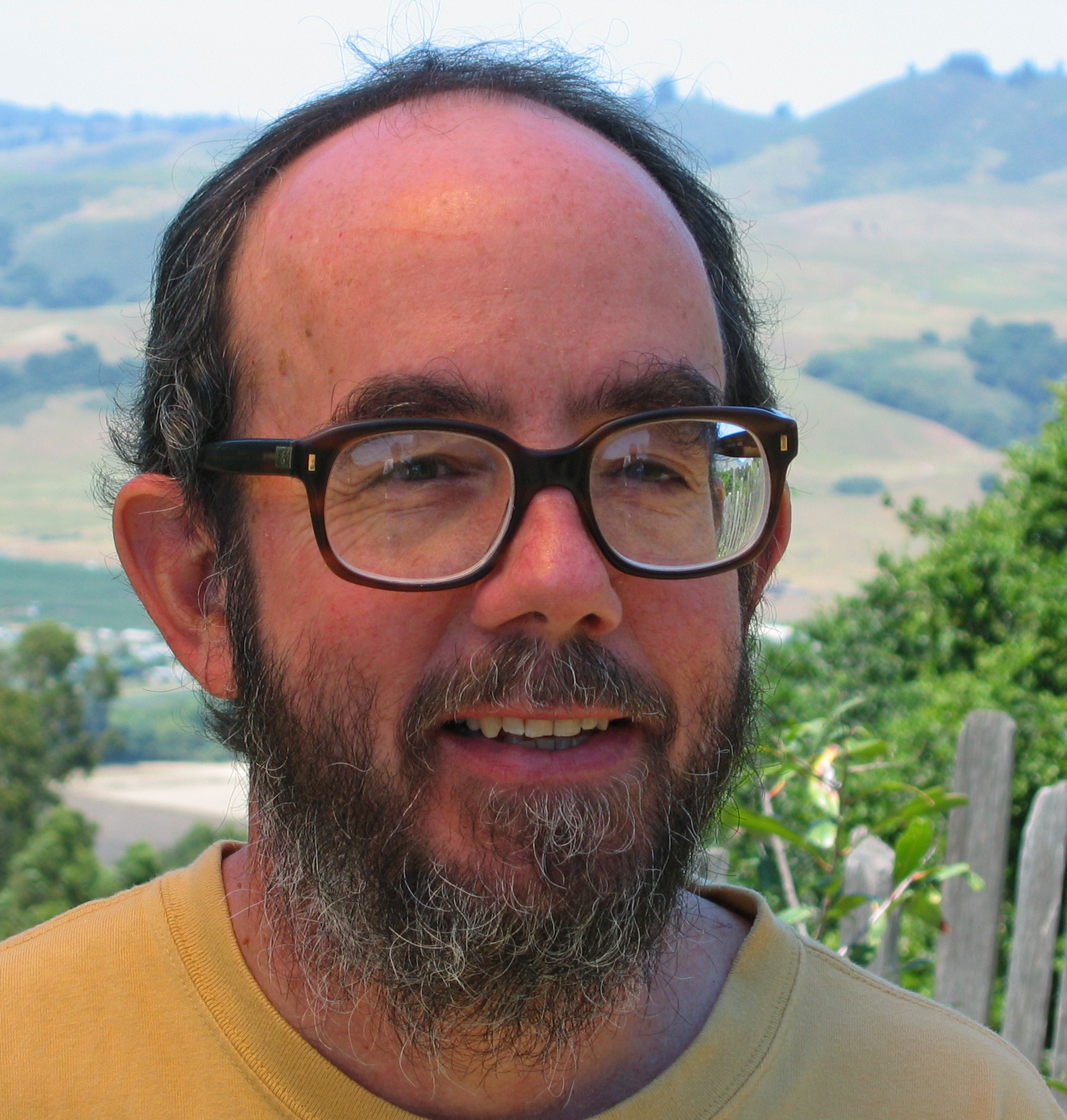
Paul Fleischman won the Newbery Medal in 1989, two years after his father Sid Fleischman won it.

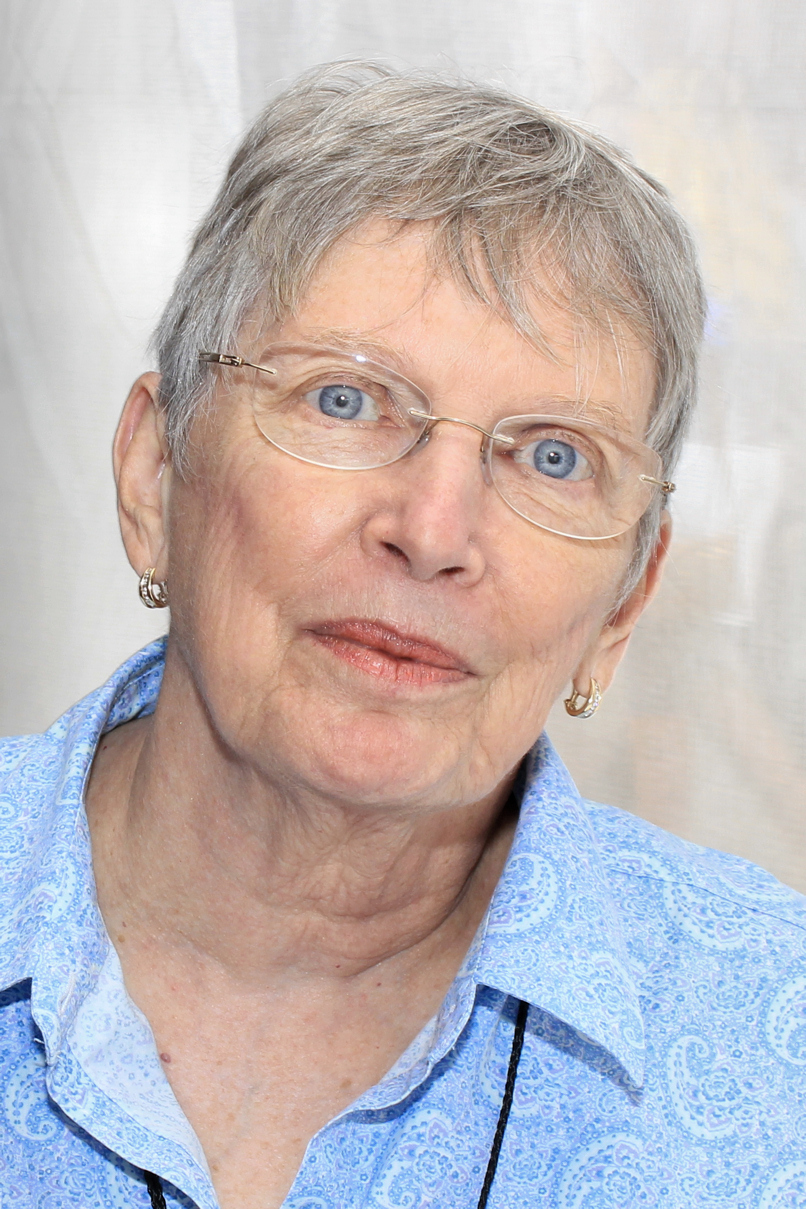
Lois Lowry won two Newbery Medals four years apart.

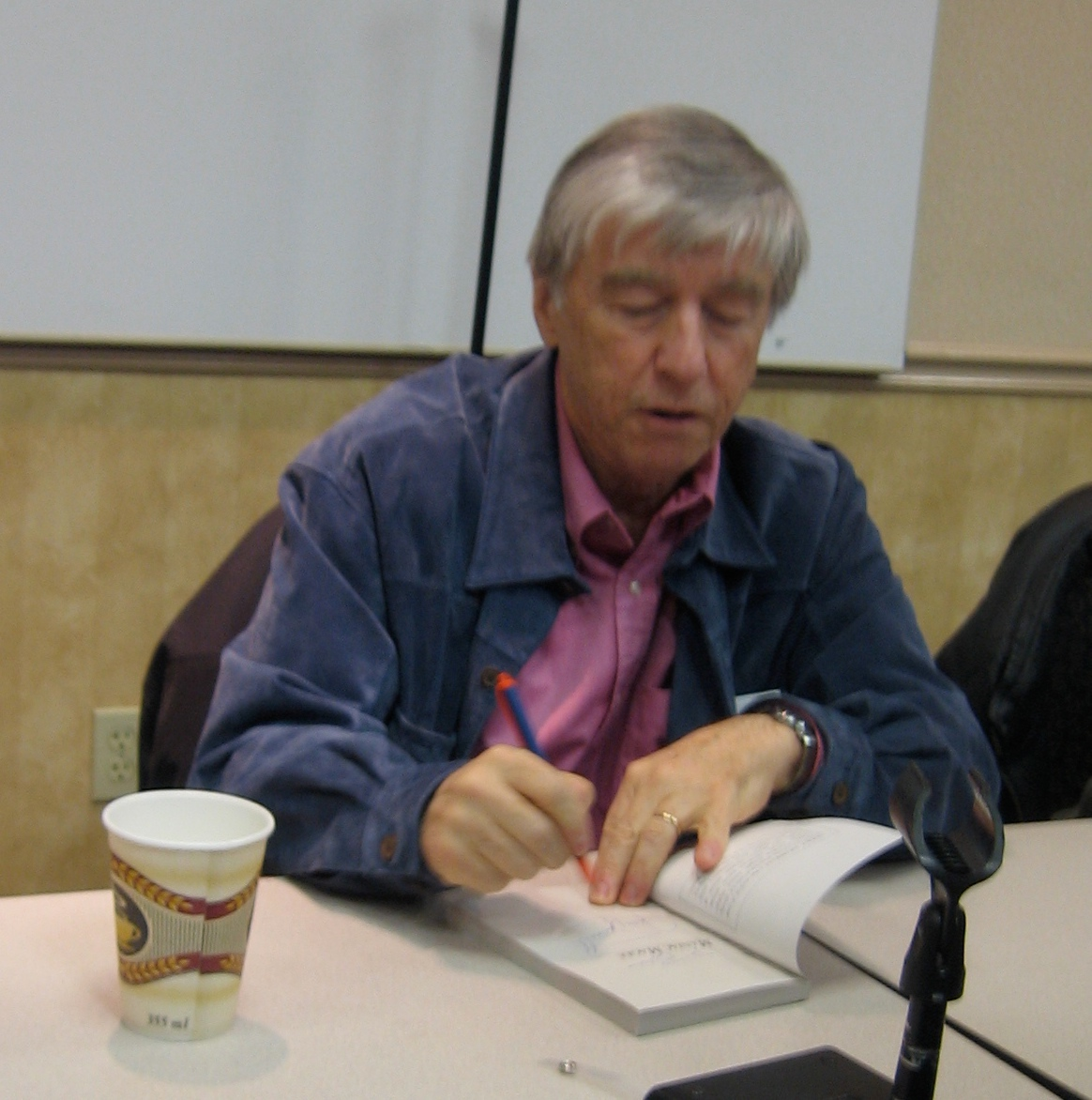
Jerry Spinelli is one of many authors to have been awarded both the Newbery Medal and Newbery Honor.

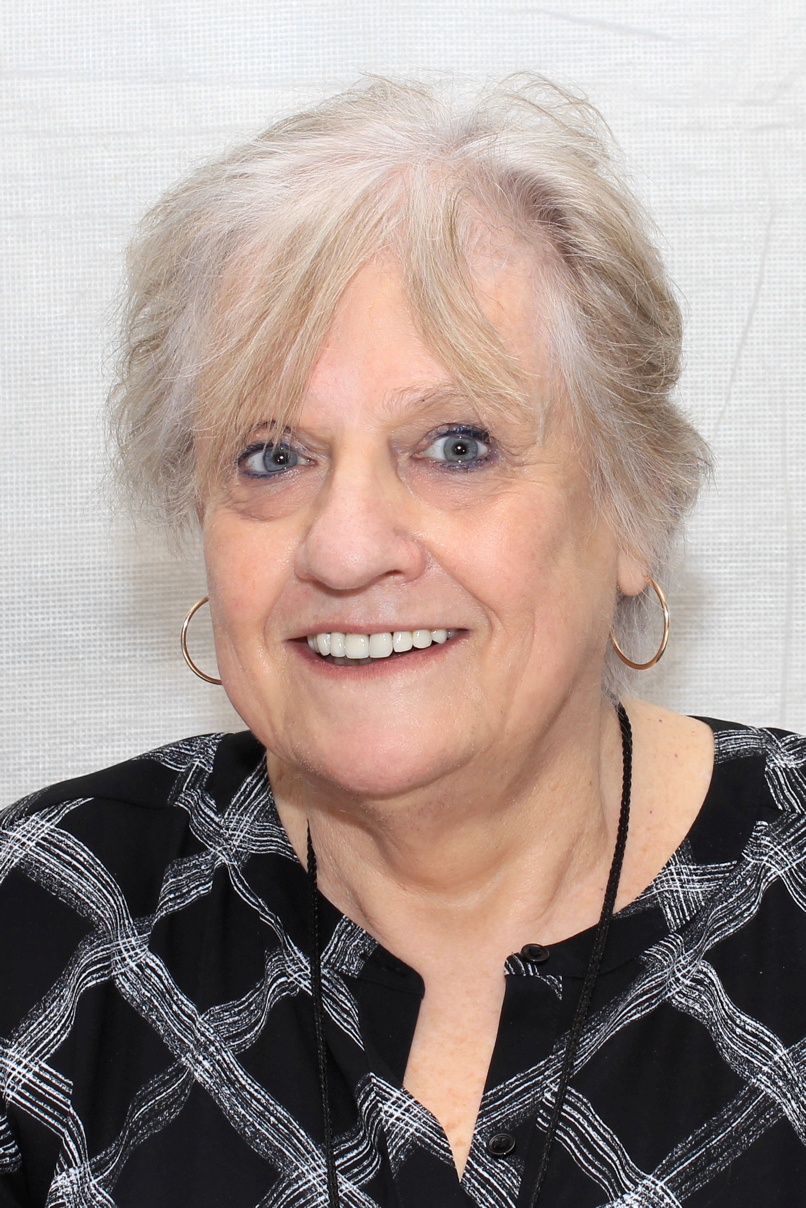
Karen Cushman followed her 1995 Newbery Honor with a 1996 Newbery Medal.

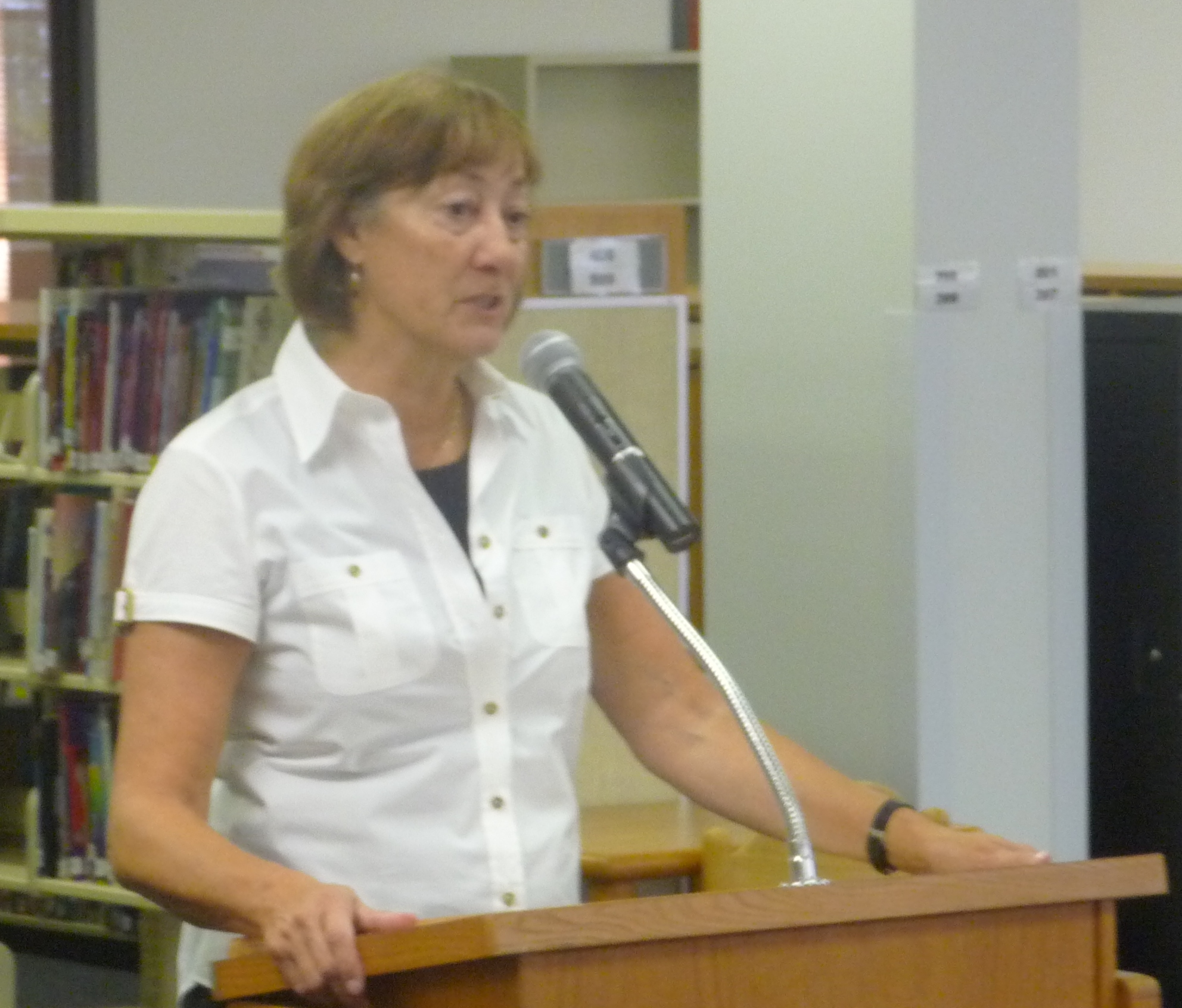
Sharon Creech has been both a winner and Honor recipient.

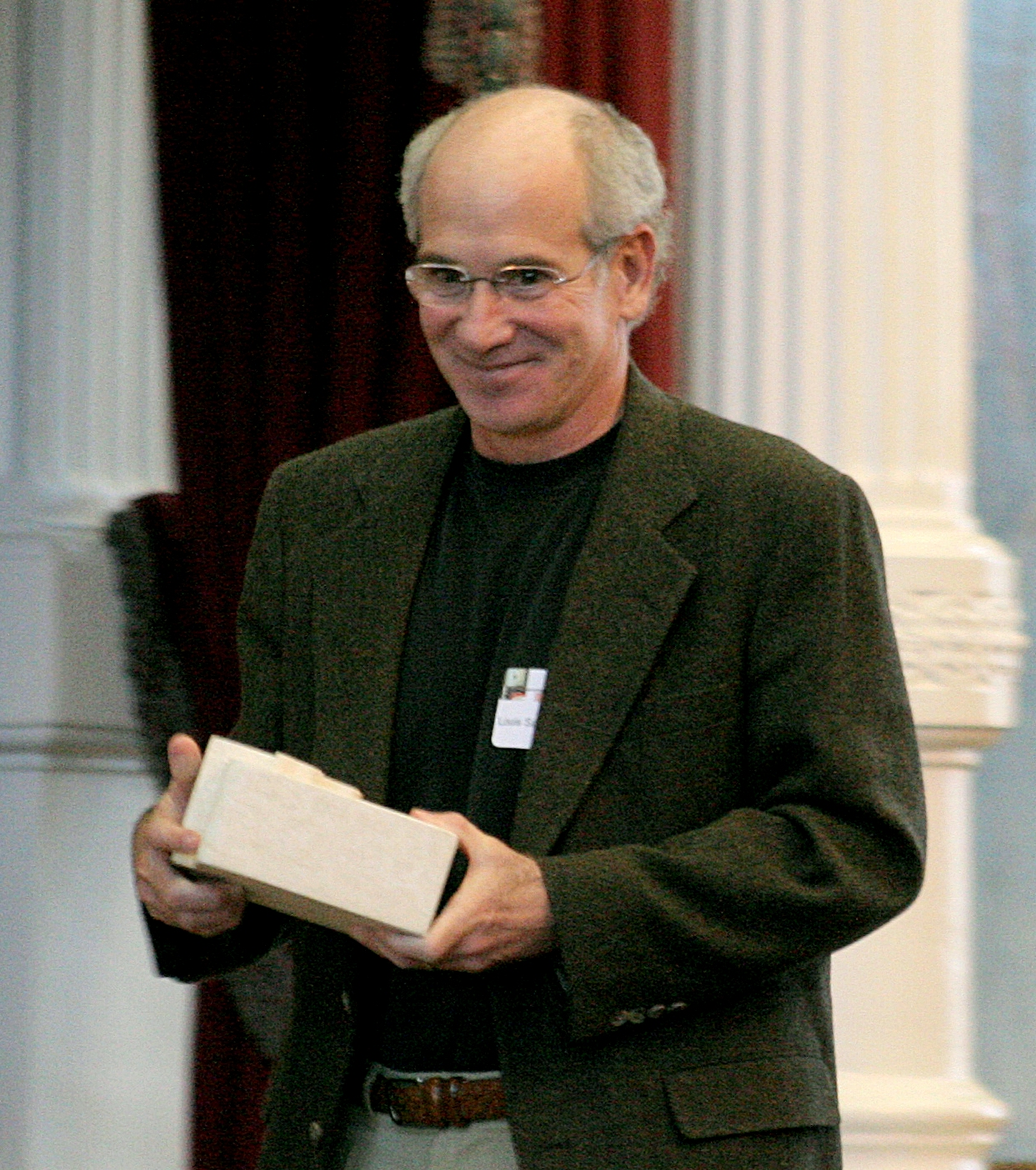
Louis Sachar won in 1999 for Holes.

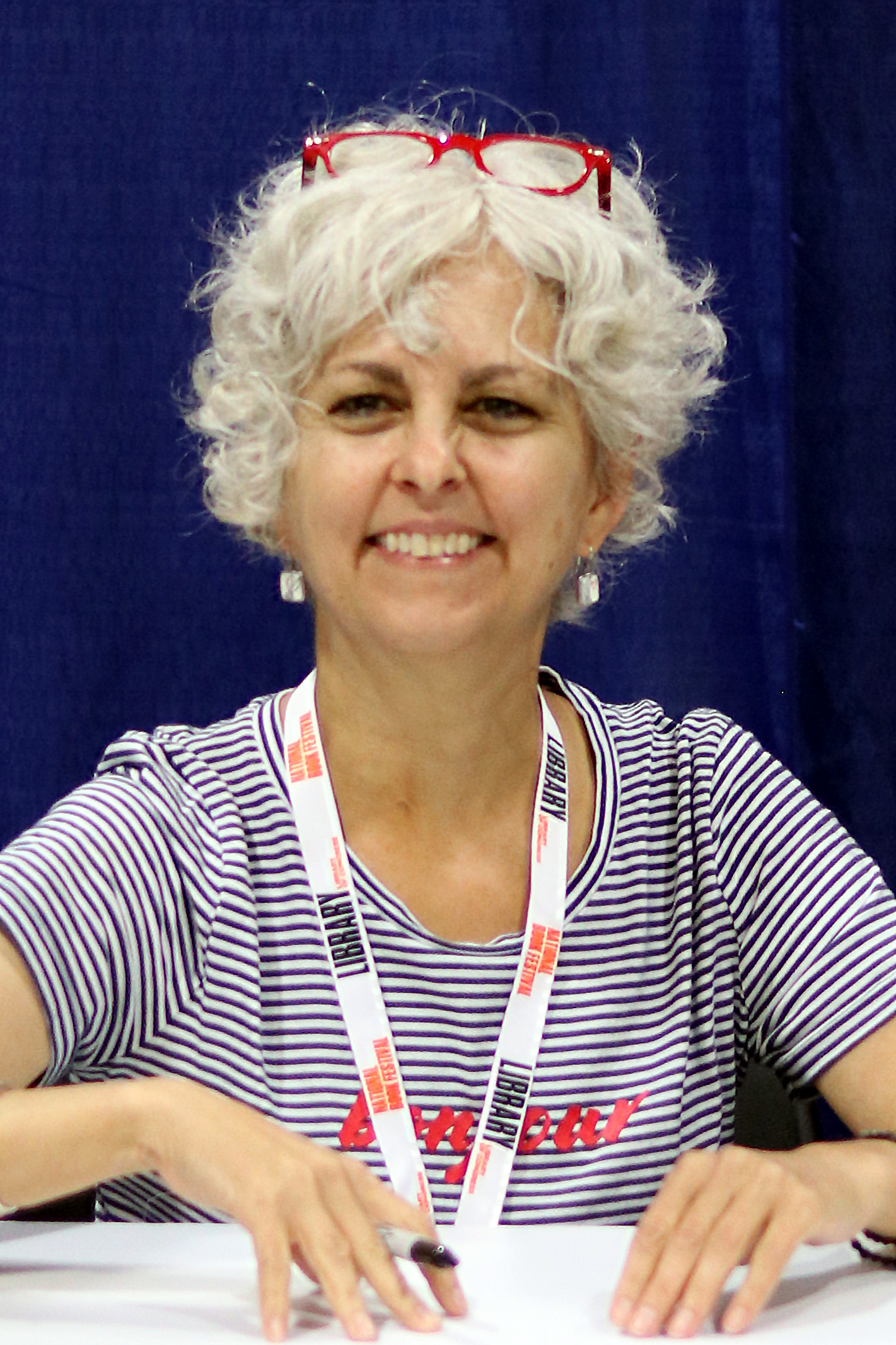
Kate DiCamillo is one of seven authors to have been a Newbery winner multiple times.

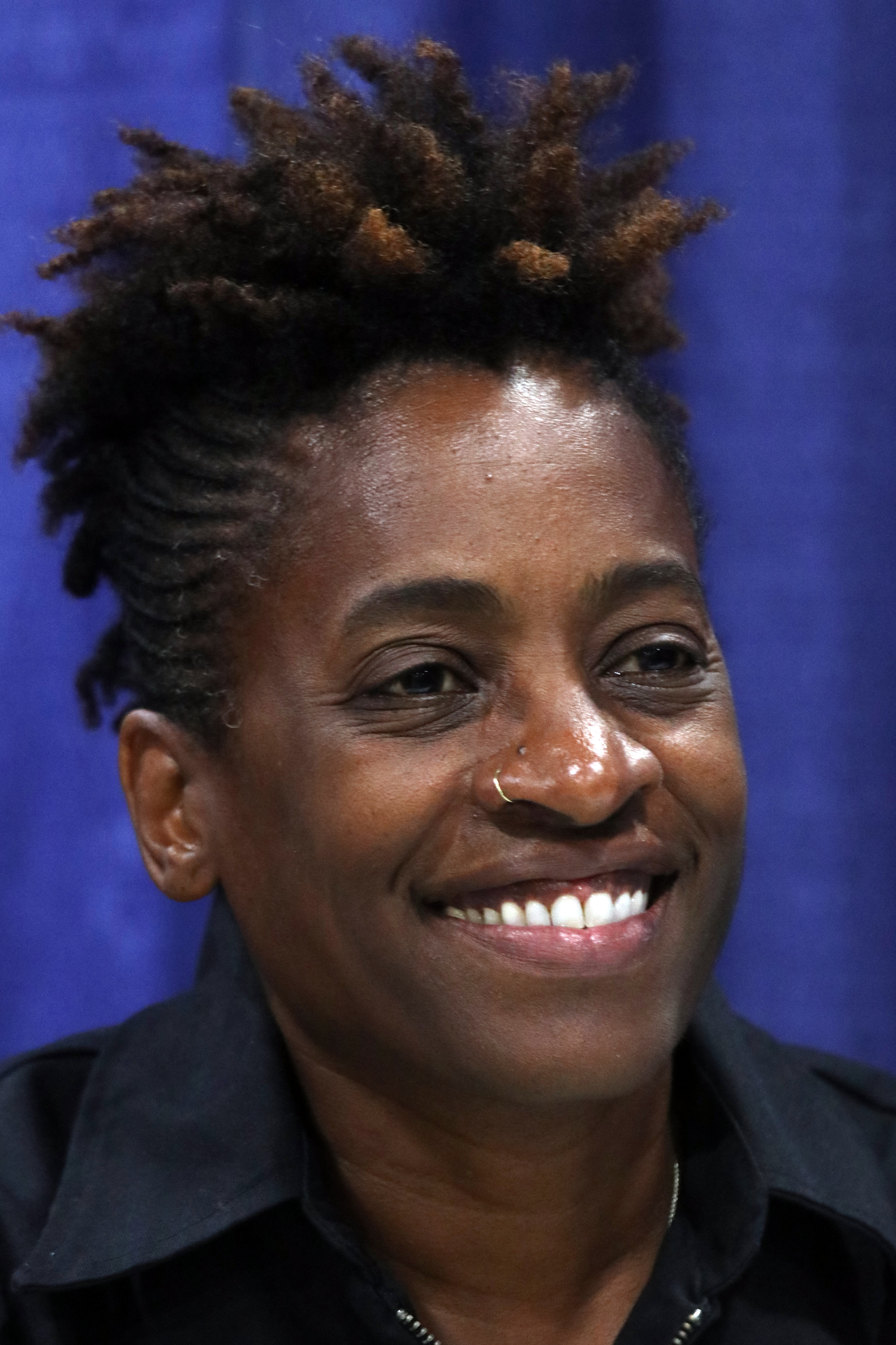
Jacqueline Woodson has been a Newbery Honor recipient four times.

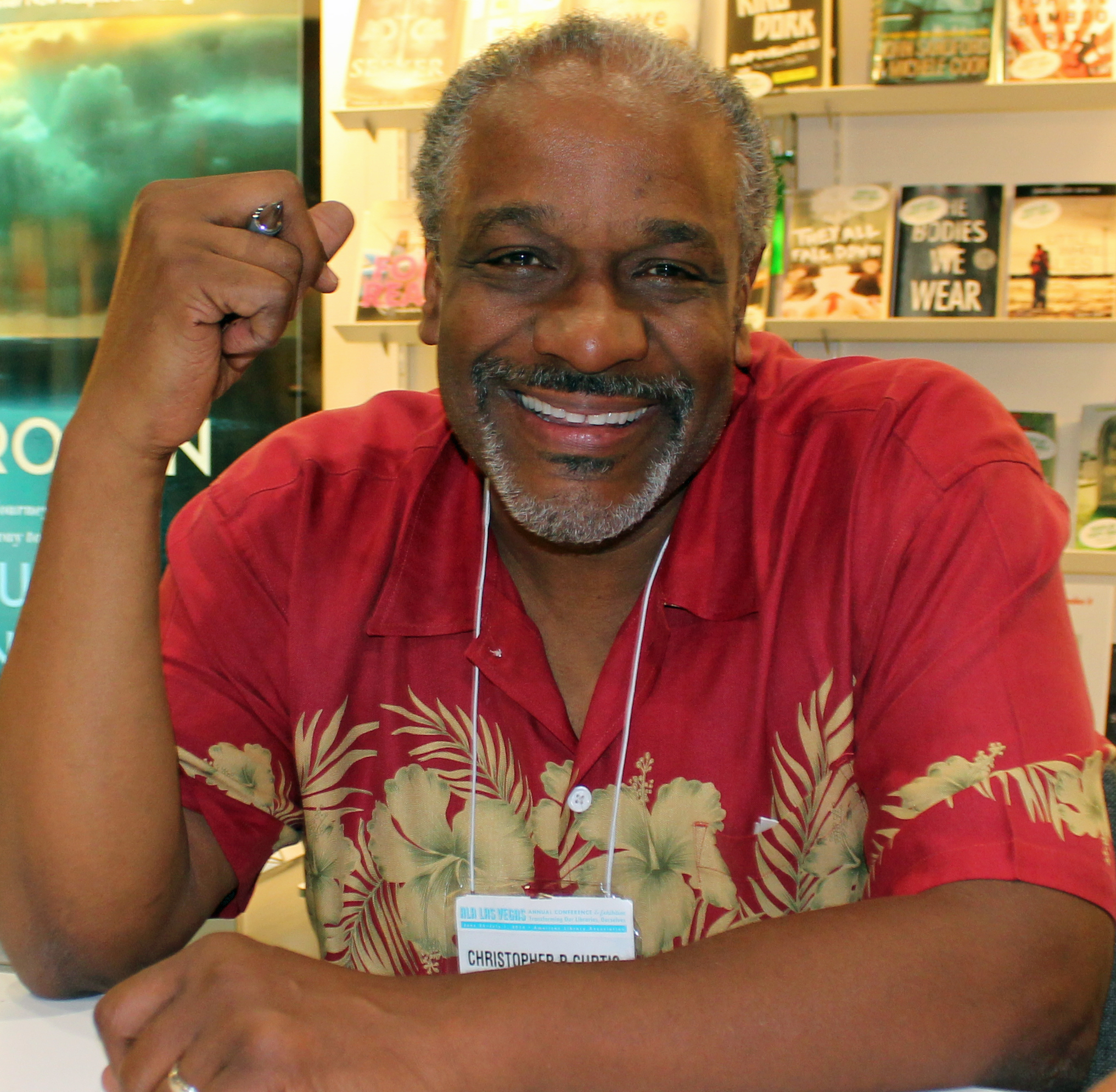
Christopher Paul Curtis won a Newbery Honor and Newbery Medal for the first two books he published, The Watsons Go to Birmingham – 1963 and Bud, Not Buddy.

Winners and Honor Books (Note: Until 1964, the Newbery Committee preferentially ranked Honor books, then called "runners-up". The default sorting of this table maintains that ranking. For example, in 1922, Cedric the Forester was the second runner-up after The Great Quest.)
Year	Author	Book	Award
1922	Hendrik Willem van Loon	The Story of Mankind	Winner
1922	Charles Boardman Hawes	The Great Quest	Honor
1922	Bernard Marshall	Cedric the Forester	Honor
1922	William Bowen	The Old Tobacco Shop: A True Account of What Befell a Little Boy in Search of Adventure	Honor
1922	Padraic Colum	The Golden Fleece and the Heroes Who Lived Before Achilles	Honor
1922	Cornelia Meigs	The Windy Hill	Honor
1923	Hugh Lofting	The Voyages of Doctor Dolittle	Winner
1924	Charles Boardman Hawes	The Dark Frigate	Winner
1925	Charles Finger	Tales from Silver Lands	Winner
1925	Anne Carroll Moore	Nicholas: A Manhattan Christmas Story	Honor
1925	Anne Parrish & Dillwyn Parrish (Note: Anne and Dillwyn Parrish jointly created The Dream Coach, one of two runners-up in 1925. But the title page of the first edition clearly states (all capitals except 'by'): "By Anne and Dillwyn Parrish * * With Pictures & A Map by The Authors". Anne is better known as a writer, Dillwyn as an artist and illustrator, and some sources credit them as writer and illustrator respectively. As of May 2016 the official list of Newbery Medal winners and runners-up cites Anne Parrish alone as the writer. (It cites no illustrator, and thus does not mention Dillwyn, because the Newbery is a literary award.) Anne Parrish alone wrote and illustrated Floating Island and The Story of Appleby Capple, Newbery runners-up in 1931 and 1951. Regarding the latter, Delaware book collector John P. Reid notes: "A juvenile, dedicated to her deceased younger brother Dillwyn and based on an alphabet game he and Anne had played as children." Reid briefly reviews their two jointly written and illustrated children's books, as well as Appleby Capple.)	The Dream Coach	Honor
1926	Arthur Bowie Chrisman	Shen of the Sea	Winner
1926	Padraic Colum	The Voyagers: Being Legends and Romances of Atlantic Discovery	Honor
1927	Will James	Smoky the Cowhorse	Winner
1928	Dhan Gopal Mukerji	Gay Neck, the Story of a Pigeon	Winner
1928	Ella Young	The Wonder Smith and His Son	Honor
1928	Caroline Snedeker	Downright Dencey	Honor
1929	Eric P. Kelly	The Trumpeter of Krakow	Winner
1929	John Bennett	The Pigtail of Ah Lee Ben Loo with Seventeen Other Laughable Tales and 200 Comical Silhouettes	Honor
1929	Wanda Gág	Millions of Cats	Honor
1929	Grace Hallock	The Boy Who Was	Honor
1929	Cornelia Meigs	Clearing Weather	Honor
1929	Grace Moon	Runaway Papoose	Honor
1929	Elinor Whitney Field	Tod of the Fens	Honor
1930	Rachel Field	Hitty, Her First Hundred Years	Winner
1930	Jeanette Eaton	A Daughter of the Seine: The Life of Madame Roland	Honor
1930	Elizabeth Cleveland Miller	Pran of Albania	Honor
1930	Marian Hurd McNeely	The Jumping-Off Place	Honor
1930	Ella Young	The Tangle-Coated Horse and Other Tales	Honor
1930	Julia Davis Adams	Vaino: A Boy of New Finland	Honor
1930	Hildegarde Swift	Little Blacknose: The Story of a Pioneer	Honor
1931	Elizabeth Coatsworth	The Cat Who Went to Heaven	Winner
1931	Anne Parrish	Floating Island	Honor
1931	Alida Malkus	The Dark Star of Itza: The Story of A Pagan Princess	Honor
1931	Ralph Hubbard	Queer Person	Honor
1931	Julia Davis Adams	Mountains Are Free	Honor
1931	Agnes Hewes	Spice and the Devil's Cave	Honor
1931	Elizabeth Gray Vining	Meggy MacIntosh	Honor
1931	Herbert Best	Garram the Hunter: A Boy of the Hill Tribes	Honor
1931	Alice Alison Lide and Margaret Alison Johansen	Ood-le-uk the Wanderer	Honor
1932	Laura Adams Armer	Waterless Mountain	Winner
1932	Dorothy P. Lathrop	The Fairy Circus	Honor
1932	Rachel Field	Calico Bush	Honor
1932	Eunice Tietjens	Boy of the South Seas	Honor
1932	Eloise Lownsbery	Out of the Flame	Honor
1932	Marjorie Hill Allee	Jane's Island	Honor
1932	Mary Gould Davis	Truce of the Wolf and Other Tales of Old Italy	Honor
1933	Elizabeth Foreman Lewis	Young Fu of the Upper Yangtze	Winner
1933	Cornelia Meigs	Swift Rivers	Honor
1933	Hildegarde Swift	The Railroad to Freedom: A Story of the Civil War	Honor
1933	Nora Burglon	Children of the Soil: A Story of Scandinavia	Honor
1934	Cornelia Meigs	Invincible Louisa	Winner
1934	Caroline Snedeker	The Forgotten Daughter	Honor
1934	Elsie Singmaster	Swords of Steel	Honor
1934	Wanda Gág	The ABC Bunny	Honor
1934	Erick Berry	Winged Girl of Knossos	Honor
1934	Sarah Lindsay Schmidt	New Land: A Novel for Boys and Girls	Honor
1934	Padraic Colum	The Big Tree of Bunlahy: Stories of My Own Countryside	Honor
1934	Agnes Hewes	Glory of the Seas	Honor
1934	Anne Dempster Kyle	Apprentice of Florence	Honor
1935	Monica Shannon	Dobry	Winner
1935	Elizabeth Seeger	Pageant of Chinese History	Honor
1935	Constance Rourke	Davy Crockett	Honor
1935	Hilda van Stockum	A Day on Skates: The Story of a Dutch Picnic	Honor
1936	Carol Ryrie Brink	Caddie Woodlawn	Winner
1936	Phil Stong	Honk, the Moose	Honor
1936	Kate Seredy	The Good Master	Honor
1936	Elizabeth Gray Vining	Young Walter Scott	Honor
1936	Armstrong Sperry	All Sail Set: A Romance of the Flying Cloud	Honor
1937	Ruth Sawyer	Roller Skates	Winner
1937	Lois Lenski	Phebe Fairchild: Her Book	Honor
1937	Idwal Jones	Whistler's Van	Honor
1937	Ludwig Bemelmans	The Golden Basket	Honor
1937	Margery Williams	Winterbound	Honor
1937	Agnes Hewes	The Codfish Musket	Honor
1937	Constance Rourke	Audubon	Honor
1938	Kate Seredy	The White Stag	Winner
1938	James Cloyd Bowman	Pecos Bill: The Greatest Cowboy of All Time	Honor
1938	Mabel Robinson	Bright Island	Honor
1938	Laura Ingalls Wilder	On the Banks of Plum Creek	Honor
1939	Elizabeth Enright	Thimble Summer	Winner
1939	Valenti Angelo	Nino	Honor
1939	Richard and Florence Atwater	Mr. Popper's Penguins	Honor
1939	Phyllis Crawford	Hello the Boat!	Honor
1939	Jeanette Eaton	Leader By Destiny: George Washington, Man and Patriot	Honor
1939	Elizabeth Gray Vining	Penn	Honor
1940	James Daugherty	Daniel Boone	Winner
1940	Kate Seredy	The Singing Tree	Honor
1940	Mabel Robinson	Runner of the Mountain Tops: The Life of Louis Agassiz	Honor
1940	Laura Ingalls Wilder	By the Shores of Silver Lake	Honor
1940	Stephen W. Meader	Boy with a Pack	Honor
1941	Armstrong Sperry	Call It Courage	Winner
1941	Mary Jane Carr	Young Mac of Fort Vancouver	Honor
1941	Doris Gates	Blue Willow	Honor
1941	Anna Gertrude Hall	Nansen	Honor
1941	Laura Ingalls Wilder	The Long Winter	Honor
1942	Walter D. Edmonds	The Matchlock Gun	Winner
1942	Laura Ingalls Wilder	Little Town on the Prairie	Honor
1942	Genevieve Foster	George Washington's World	Honor
1942	Lois Lenski	Indian Captive: The Story of Mary Jemison	Honor
1942	Eva Roe Gaggin	Down Ryton Water	Honor
1943	Elizabeth Gray Vining	Adam of the Road	Winner
1943	Eleanor Estes	The Middle Moffat	Honor
1943	Mabel Leigh Hunt	Have You Seen Tom Thumb?	Honor
1944	Esther Forbes	Johnny Tremain	Winner
1944	Laura Ingalls Wilder	These Happy Golden Years	Honor
1944	Julia Sauer	Fog Magic	Honor
1944	Eleanor Estes	Rufus M.	Honor
1944	Elizabeth Yates	Mountain Born	Honor
1945	Robert Lawson	Rabbit Hill	Winner
1945	Eleanor Estes	The Hundred Dresses	Honor
1945	Alice Dalgliesh	The Silver Pencil	Honor
1945	Genevieve Foster	Abraham Lincoln's World	Honor
1945	Jeanette Eaton	Lone Journey: The Life of Roger Williams	Honor
1946	Lois Lenski	Strawberry Girl	Winner
1946	Marguerite Henry	Justin Morgan Had a Horse	Honor
1946	Florence Crannell Means	The Moved-Outers	Honor
1946	Christine Weston	Bhimsa, the Dancing Bear	Honor
1946	Katherine Shippen	New Found World	Honor
1947	Carolyn Sherwin Bailey	Miss Hickory	Winner
1947	Nancy Barnes	The Wonderful Year	Honor
1947	Mary & Conrad Buff	Big Tree	Honor
1947	William Maxwell	The Heavenly Tenants	Honor
1947	Cyrus Fisher	The Avion My Uncle Flew	Honor
1947	Eleanore M. Jewett	The Hidden Treasure of Glaston	Honor
1948	William Pène du Bois	The Twenty-One Balloons	Winner
1948	Claire Huchet Bishop	Pancakes-Paris	Honor
1948	Carolyn Treffinger	Li Lun, Lad of Courage	Honor
1948	Catherine Besterman	The Quaint and Curious Quest of Johnny Longfoot	Honor
1948	Harold Courlander	The Cow-Tail Switch, and Other West African Stories	Honor
1948	Marguerite Henry	Misty of Chincoteague	Honor
1949	Marguerite Henry	King of the Wind	Winner
1949	Holling C. Holling	Seabird	Honor
1949	Louise Rankin	Daughter of the Mountains	Honor
1949	Ruth S. Gannett	My Father's Dragon	Honor
1949	Arna Bontemps	Story of the Negro	Honor
1950	Marguerite de Angeli	The Door in the Wall	Winner
1950	Rebecca Caudill	Tree of Freedom	Honor
1950	Catherine Coblentz	The Blue Cat of Castle Town	Honor
1950	Rutherford George Montgomery	Kildee House	Honor
1950	Genevieve Foster	George Washington	Honor
1950	Walter & Marion Havighurst	Song of the Pines: A Story of Norwegian Lumbering in Wisconsin	Honor
1951	Elizabeth Yates	Amos Fortune, Free Man	Winner
1951	Mabel Leigh Hunt	Better Known as Johnny Appleseed	Honor
1951	Jeanette Eaton	Gandhi, Fighter Without a Sword	Honor
1951	Clara Ingram Judson	Abraham Lincoln, Friend of the People	Honor
1951	Anne Parrish	The Story of Appleby Capple	Honor
1952	Eleanor Estes	Ginger Pye	Winner
1952	Elizabeth Baity	Americans Before Columbus	Honor
1952	Holling C. Holling	Minn of the Mississippi	Honor
1952	Nicholas Kalashnikoff	The Defender	Honor
1952	Julia Sauer	The Light at Tern Rock	Honor
1952	Mary & Conrad Buff	The Apple and the Arrow	Honor
1953	Ann Nolan Clark	Secret of the Andes	Winner
1953	E. B. White	Charlotte's Web	Honor
1953	Eloise Jarvis McGraw	Moccasin Trail	Honor
1953	Ann Weil	Red Sails to Capri	Honor
1953	Alice Dalgliesh	The Bears on Hemlock Mountain	Honor
1953	Genevieve Foster	Birthdays of Freedom, Vol. 1	Honor
1954	Joseph Krumgold	...And Now Miguel	Winner
1954	Claire Huchet Bishop	All Alone	Honor
1954	Meindert De Jong	Shadrach	Honor
1954	Meindert De Jong	Hurry Home, Candy	Honor
1954	Clara Ingram Judson	Theodore Roosevelt, Fighting Patriot	Honor
1954	Mary & Conrad Buff	Magic Maize	Honor
1955	Meindert De Jong	The Wheel on the School	Winner
1955	Alice Dalgliesh	The Courage of Sarah Noble	Honor
1955	James Ullman	Banner in the Sky	Honor
1956	Jean Lee Latham	Carry On, Mr. Bowditch	Winner
1956	Marjorie Kinnan Rawlings	The Secret River	Honor
1956	Jennie Lindquist	The Golden Name Day	Honor
1956	Katherine Shippen	Men, Microscopes, and Living Things	Honor
1957	Virginia Sorensen	Miracles on Maple Hill	Winner
1957	Fred Gipson	Old Yeller	Honor
1957	Meindert De Jong	The House of Sixty Fathers	Honor
1957	Clara Ingram Judson	Mr. Justice Holmes	Honor
1957	Dorothy Rhoads	The Corn Grows Ripe	Honor
1957	Marguerite de Angeli	Black Fox of Lorne	Honor
1958	Harold Keith	Rifles for Watie	Winner
1958	Mari Sandoz	The Horsecatcher	Honor
1958	Elizabeth Enright	Gone-Away Lake	Honor
1958	Robert Lawson	The Great Wheel	Honor
1958	Leo Gurko	Tom Paine: Freedom's Apostle	Honor
1959	Elizabeth George Speare	The Witch of Blackbird Pond	Winner
1959	Natalie Savage Carlson	The Family Under the Bridge	Honor
1959	Meindert De Jong	Along Came a Dog	Honor
1959	Francis Kalnay	Chucaro: Wild Pony of the Pampa	Honor
1959	William O. Steele	The Perilous Road	Honor
1960	Joseph Krumgold	Onion John	Winner
1960	Jean Craighead George	My Side of the Mountain	Honor
1960	Gerald W. Johnson	America Is Born: A History for Peter	Honor
1960	Carol Kendall	The Gammage Cup	Honor
1961	Scott O'Dell	Island of the Blue Dolphins	Winner
1961	Gerald W. Johnson	America Moves Forward: A History for Peter	Honor
1961	Jack Schaefer	Old Ramon	Honor
1961	George Selden	The Cricket in Times Square	Honor
1962	Elizabeth George Speare	The Bronze Bow	Winner
1962	Edwin Tunis	Frontier Living	Honor
1962	Eloise Jarvis McGraw	The Golden Goblet	Honor
1962	Mary Stolz	Belling The Tiger	Honor
1963	Madeleine L'Engle	A Wrinkle in Time	Winner
1963	Sorche Nic Leodhas	Thistle and Thyme: Tales and Legends from Scotland	Honor
1963	Olivia Coolidge	Men of Athens	Honor
1964	Emily Cheney Neville	It's Like This, Cat	Winner
1964	Sterling North	Rascal	Honor
1964	Ester Wier	The Loner	Honor
1965	Maia Wojciechowska	Shadow of a Bull	Winner
1965	Irene Hunt	Across Five Aprils	Honor
1966	Elizabeth Borton de Treviño	I, Juan de Pareja	Winner
1966	Lloyd Alexander	The Black Cauldron	Honor
1966	Randall Jarrell	The Animal Family	Honor
1966	Mary Stolz	The Noonday Friends	Honor
1967	Irene Hunt	Up a Road Slowly	Winner
1967	Scott O'Dell	The King's Fifth	Honor
1967	Isaac Bashevis Singer	Zlateh the Goat and Other Stories	Honor
1967	Mary Hays Weik	The Jazz Man	Honor
1968	E. L. Konigsburg	From the Mixed-Up Files of Mrs. Basil E. Frankweiler	Winner
1968	E. L. Konigsburg	Jennifer, Hecate, Macbeth, William McKinley, and Me, Elizabeth	Honor
1968	Scott O'Dell	The Black Pearl	Honor
1968	Isaac Bashevis Singer	The Fearsome Inn	Honor
1968	Zilpha Keatley Snyder	The Egypt Game	Honor
1969	Lloyd Alexander	The High King	Winner
1969	Julius Lester	To Be a Slave	Honor
1969	Isaac Bashevis Singer	When Shlemiel Went to Warsaw and Other Stories	Honor
1970	William H. Armstrong	Sounder	Winner
1970	Sulamith Ish-kishor	Our Eddie	Honor
1970	Janet Gaylord Moore	The Many Ways of Seeing: An Introduction to the Pleasures of Art	Honor
1970	Mary Q. Steele	Journey Outside	Honor
1971	Betsy Byars	Summer of the Swans	Winner
1971	Natalie Babbitt	Kneeknock Rise	Honor
1971	Sylvia Engdahl	Enchantress from the Stars	Honor
1971	Scott O'Dell	Sing Down the Moon	Honor
1972	Robert C. O'Brien	Mrs. Frisby and the Rats of NIMH	Winner
1972	Allan W. Eckert	Incident at Hawk's Hill	Honor
1972	Virginia Hamilton	The Planet of Junior Brown	Honor
1972	Ursula K. Le Guin	The Tombs of Atuan	Honor
1972	Miska Miles	Annie and the Old One	Honor
1972	Zilpha Keatley Snyder	The Headless Cupid	Honor
1973	Jean Craighead George	Julie of the Wolves	Winner
1973	Arnold Lobel	Frog and Toad Together	Honor
1973	Johanna Reiss	The Upstairs Room	Honor
1973	Zilpha Keatley Snyder	The Witches of Worm	Honor
1974	Paula Fox	The Slave Dancer	Winner
1974	Susan Cooper	The Dark Is Rising	Honor
1975	Virginia Hamilton	M. C. Higgins, the Great	Winner
1975	James Lincoln Collier & Christopher Collier	My Brother Sam Is Dead	Honor
1975	Bette Greene	Philip Hall Likes Me, I Reckon Maybe	Honor
1975	Elizabeth Marie Pope	The Perilous Gard	Honor
1975	Ellen Raskin	Figgs & Phantoms	Honor
1976	Susan Cooper	The Grey King	Winner
1976	Sharon Bell Mathis	The Hundred Penny Box	Honor
1976	Laurence Yep	Dragonwings	Honor
1977	Mildred D. Taylor	Roll of Thunder, Hear My Cry	Winner
1977	Nancy Bond	A String in the Harp	Honor
1977	William Steig	Abel's Island	Honor
1978	Katherine Paterson	Bridge to Terabithia	Winner
1978	Beverly Cleary	Ramona and Her Father	Honor
1978	Jamake Highwater	Anpao: An American Indian Odyssey	Honor
1979	Ellen Raskin	The Westing Game	Winner
1979	Katherine Paterson	The Great Gilly Hopkins	Honor
1980	Joan Blos	A Gathering of Days: A New England Girl's Journal	Winner
1980	David Kherdian	The Road from Home	Honor
1981	Katherine Paterson	Jacob Have I Loved	Winner
1981	Jane Langton	The Fledgling	Honor
1981	Madeleine L'Engle	A Ring of Endless Light	Honor
1982	Nancy Willard	A Visit to William Blake's Inn	Winner
1982	Beverly Cleary	Ramona Quimby, Age 8	Honor
1982	Aranka Siegal	Upon the Head of the Goat: A Childhood in Hungary 1939–1944	Honor
1983	Cynthia Voigt	Dicey's Song	Winner
1983	Paul Fleischman	Graven Images	Honor
1983	Jean Fritz	Homesick: My Own Story	Honor
1983	Virginia Hamilton	Sweet Whispers, Brother Rush	Honor
1983	Robin McKinley	The Blue Sword	Honor
1983	William Steig	Doctor De Soto	Honor
1984	Beverly Cleary	Dear Mr. Henshaw	Winner
1984	Bill Brittain	The Wish Giver	Honor
1984	Kathryn Lasky	Sugaring Time	Honor
1984	Elizabeth George Speare	The Sign of the Beaver	Honor
1984	Cynthia Voigt	A Solitary Blue	Honor
1985	Robin McKinley	The Hero and the Crown	Winner
1985	Bruce Brooks	The Moves Make the Man	Honor
1985	Paula Fox	One-Eyed Cat	Honor
1985	Mavis Jukes	Like Jake and Me	Honor
1986	Patricia MacLachlan	Sarah, Plain and Tall	Winner
1986	Rhoda Blumberg	Commodore Perry in the Land of the Shogun	Honor
1986	Gary Paulsen	Dogsong	Honor
1987	Sid Fleischman	The Whipping Boy	Winner
1987	Marion Dane Bauer	On My Honor	Honor
1987	Patricia Lauber	Volcano: The Eruption and Healing of Mount St. Helens	Honor
1987	Cynthia Rylant	A Fine White Dust	Honor
1988	Russell Freedman	Lincoln: A Photobiography	Winner
1988	Norma Fox Mazer	After the Rain	Honor
1988	Gary Paulsen	Hatchet	Honor
1989	Paul Fleischman	Joyful Noise: Poems for Two Voices	Winner
1989	Virginia Hamilton	In The Beginning: Creation Stories from Around the World	Honor
1989	Walter Dean Myers	Scorpions	Honor
1990	Lois Lowry	Number the Stars	Winner
1990	Janet Taylor Lisle	Afternoon of the Elves	Honor
1990	Gary Paulsen	The Winter Room	Honor
1990	Suzanne Fisher Staples	Shabanu, Daughter of the Wind	Honor
1991	Jerry Spinelli	Maniac Magee	Winner
1991	Avi	The True Confessions of Charlotte Doyle	Honor
1992	Phyllis Reynolds Naylor	Shiloh	Winner
1992	Avi	Nothing But The Truth: a Documentary Novel	Honor
1992	Russell Freedman	The Wright Brothers: How They Invented the Airplane	Honor
1993	Cynthia Rylant	Missing May	Winner
1993	Bruce Brooks	What Hearts	Honor
1993	Patricia McKissack	The Dark-Thirty	Honor
1993	Walter Dean Myers	Somewhere in the Darkness	Honor
1994	Lois Lowry	The Giver	Winner
1994	Jane Leslie Conly	Crazy Lady!	Honor
1994	Russell Freedman	Eleanor Roosevelt: A Life of Discovery	Honor
1994	Laurence Yep	Dragon's Gate	Honor
1995	Sharon Creech	Walk Two Moons	Winner
1995	Karen Cushman	Catherine, Called Birdy	Honor
1995	Nancy Farmer	The Ear, the Eye and the Arm	Honor
1996	Karen Cushman	The Midwife's Apprentice	Winner
1996	Carolyn Coman	What Jamie Saw	Honor
1996	Christopher Paul Curtis	The Watsons Go to Birmingham – 1963	Honor
1996	Carol Fenner	Yolonda's Genius	Honor
1996	Jim Murphy	The Great Fire	Honor
1997	E. L. Konigsburg	The View from Saturday	Winner
1997	Nancy Farmer	A Girl Named Disaster	Honor
1997	Eloise Jarvis McGraw	The Moorchild	Honor
1997	Megan Whalen Turner	The Thief	Honor
1997	Ruth White	Belle Prater's Boy	Honor
1998	Karen Hesse	Out of the Dust	Winner
1998	Patricia Reilly Giff	Lily's Crossing	Honor
1998	Gail Carson Levine	Ella Enchanted	Honor
1998	Jerry Spinelli	Wringer	Honor
1999	Louis Sachar	Holes	Winner
1999	Richard Peck	A Long Way from Chicago	Honor
2000	Christopher Paul Curtis	Bud, Not Buddy	Winner
2000	Audrey Couloumbis	Getting Near to Baby	Honor
2000	Jennifer L. Holm	Our Only May Amelia	Honor
2000	Tomie dePaola	26 Fairmount Avenue	Honor
2001	Richard Peck	A Year Down Yonder	Winner
2001	Joan Bauer	Hope Was Here	Honor
2001	Sharon Creech	The Wanderer	Honor
2001	Kate DiCamillo	Because of Winn-Dixie	Honor
2001	Jack Gantos	Joey Pigza Loses Control	Honor
2002	Linda Sue Park	A Single Shard	Winner
2002	Polly Horvath	Everything on a Waffle	Honor
2002	Marilyn Nelson	Carver: A Life in Poems	Honor
2003	Avi	Crispin: The Cross of Lead	Winner
2003	Nancy Farmer	The House of the Scorpion	Honor
2003	Patricia Reilly Giff	Pictures of Hollis Woods	Honor
2003	Carl Hiaasen	Hoot	Honor
2003	Ann M. Martin	A Corner of the Universe	Honor
2003	Stephanie S. Tolan	Surviving the Applewhites	Honor
2004	Kate DiCamillo	The Tale of Despereaux	Winner
2004	Kevin Henkes	Olive's Ocean	Honor
2004	Jim Murphy	An American Plague: The True and Terrifying Story of the Yellow Fever Epidemic of 1793	Honor
2005	Cynthia Kadohata	Kira-Kira	Winner
2005	Gennifer Choldenko	Al Capone Does My Shirts	Honor
2005	Russell Freedman	The Voice That Challenged a Nation: Marian Anderson and the Struggle for Equal Rights	Honor
2005	Gary D. Schmidt	Lizzie Bright and the Buckminster Boy	Honor
2006	Lynne Rae Perkins	Criss Cross	Winner
2006	Alan Armstrong	Whittington	Honor
2006	Susan Campbell Bartoletti	Hitler Youth: Growing Up in Hitler's Shadow	Honor
2006	Shannon Hale	Princess Academy	Honor
2006	Jacqueline Woodson	Show Way	Honor
2007	Susan Patron	The Higher Power of Lucky	Winner
2007	Jennifer L. Holm	Penny from Heaven	Honor
2007	Kirby Larson	Hattie Big Sky	Honor
2007	Cynthia Lord	Rules	Honor
2008	Laura Amy Schlitz	Good Masters! Sweet Ladies! Voices from a Medieval Village	Winner
2008	Christopher Paul Curtis	Elijah of Buxton	Honor
2008	Gary D. Schmidt	The Wednesday Wars	Honor
2008	Jacqueline Woodson	Feathers	Honor
2009	Neil Gaiman	The Graveyard Book	Winner
2009	Kathi Appelt	The Underneath	Honor
2009	Margarita Engle	The Surrender Tree: Poems of Cuba's Struggle for Freedom	Honor
2009	Ingrid Law	Savvy	Honor
2009	Jacqueline Woodson	After Tupac and D Foster	Honor
2010	Rebecca Stead	When You Reach Me	Winner
2010	Phillip Hoose	Claudette Colvin: Twice Toward Justice	Honor
2010	Jacqueline Kelly	The Evolution of Calpurnia Tate	Honor
2010	Grace Lin	Where the Mountain Meets the Moon	Honor
2010	Rodman Philbrick	The Mostly True Adventures of Homer P. Figg	Honor
2011	Clare Vanderpool	Moon Over Manifest	Winner
2011	Jennifer L. Holm	Turtle in Paradise	Honor
2011	Margi Preus	Heart of a Samurai	Honor
2011	Joyce Sidman	Dark Emperor & Other Poems of the Night	Honor
2011	Rita Williams-Garcia	One Crazy Summer	Honor
2012	Jack Gantos	Dead End in Norvelt	Winner
2012	Thanhha Lai	Inside Out & Back Again	Honor
2012	Eugene Yelchin	Breaking Stalin's Nose	Honor
2013	Katherine Applegate	The One and Only Ivan	Winner
2013	Laura Amy Schlitz	Splendors and Glooms	Honor
2013	Steve Sheinkin	Bomb: The Race to Build—and Steal—the World's Most Dangerous Weapon	Honor
2013	Sheila Turnage	Three Times Lucky	Honor
2014	Kate DiCamillo	Flora & Ulysses: The Illuminated Adventures	Winner
2014	Holly Black	Doll Bones	Honor
2014	Kevin Henkes	The Year of Billy Miller	Honor
2014	Amy Timberlake	One Came Home	Honor
2014	Vince Vawter	Paperboy	Honor
2015	Kwame Alexander	The Crossover	Winner
2015	Cece Bell	El Deafo	Honor
2015	Jacqueline Woodson	Brown Girl Dreaming	Honor
2016	Matt de la Peña	Last Stop on Market Street	Winner
2016	Kimberly Brubaker Bradley	The War That Saved My Life	Honor
2016	Victoria Jamieson	Roller Girl	Honor
2016	Pam Muñoz Ryan	Echo	Honor
2017	Kelly Barnhill	The Girl Who Drank the Moon	Winner
2017	Ashley Bryan	Freedom Over Me: Eleven Slaves, Their Lives and Dreams Brought to Life by Ashley Bryan	Honor
2017	Adam Gidwitz	The Inquisitor's Tale: Or, The Three Magical Children and Their Holy Dog	Honor
2017	Lauren Wolk	Wolf Hollow	Honor
2018	Erin Entrada Kelly	Hello, Universe	Winner
2018	Derrick Barnes	Crown: An Ode to the Fresh Cut	Honor
2018	Jason Reynolds	Long Way Down	Honor
2018	Renée Watson	Piecing Me Together	Honor
2019	Meg Medina	Merci Suárez Changes Gears	Winner
2019	Veera Hiranandani	The Night Diary	Honor
2019	Catherine Gilbert Murdock	The Book of Boy	Honor
2020	Jerry Craft	New Kid	Winner
2020	Kwame Alexander	The Undefeated	Honor
2020	Christian McKay Heidicker	Scary Stories for Young Foxes	Honor
2020	Jasmine Warga	Other Words for Home	Honor
2020	Alicia D. Williams	Genesis Begins Again	Honor
2021	Tae Keller	When You Trap a Tiger	Winner
2021	Kimberly Brubaker Bradley	Fighting Words	Honor
2021	Erin Entrada Kelly	We Dream of Space	Honor
2021	Christina Soontornvat	All Thirteen: The Incredible Cave Rescue of the Thai Boys' Soccer Team	Honor
2021	Christina Soontornvat	A Wish in the Dark	Honor
2021	Carole Boston Weatherford	Box: Henry Brown Mails Himself to Freedom	Honor
2022	Donna Barba Higuera	The Last Cuentista	Winner
2022	Rajani LaRocca	Red, White, and Whole	Honor
2022	Darcie Little Badger	A Snake Falls to Earth	Honor
2022	Kyle Lukoff	Too Bright to See	Honor
2022	Andrea Wang	Watercress	Honor
2023	Amina Luqman-Dawson	Freewater	Winner
2023	Andrea Beatriz Arango	Iveliz Explains It All	Honor
2023	Christina Soontornvat	The Last Mapmaker	Honor
2023	Lisa Yee	Maizy Chen's Last Chance	Honor
2024	Dave Eggers	The Eyes and the Impossible	Winner
2024	M.T. Anderson	Elf Dog and Owl Head	Honor
2024	Erin Bow	Simon Sort of Says	Honor
2024	Nasuġraq Rainey Hopson	Eagle Drums	Honor
2024	Pedro Martín	Mexikid: A Graphic Memoir	Honor
2024	Daniel Nayeri	The Many Assassinations of Samir, the Seller of Dreams	Honor
2025	Erin Entrada Kelly	The First State of Being	Winner
2025	Ruth Behar	Across So Many Seas	Honor
2025	Lesa Cline-Ransome	One Big Open Sky	Honor
2025	Chanel Miller	Magnolia Wu Unfolds It All	Honor
2025	Kate O'Shaughnessy	The Wrong Way Home	Honor
2026	Renée Watson	All the Blues in the Sky	Winner
2026	María Dolores Águila	A Sea of Lemon Trees: The Corrido of Roberto Alvarez	Honor
2026	Karina Yan Glaser	The Nine Moons of Han Yu and Luli	Honor
2026	Aubrey Hartman	The Undead Fox of Deadwood Forest	Honor
2026	Daniel Nayeri	The Teacher of Nomad Land: A World War II Story	Honor

== Multiple award winners ==
Listed below are all authors who have won at least two Newbery Medals or who have two or more Medals and/or Honors. Won a Newbery Medal and Honor

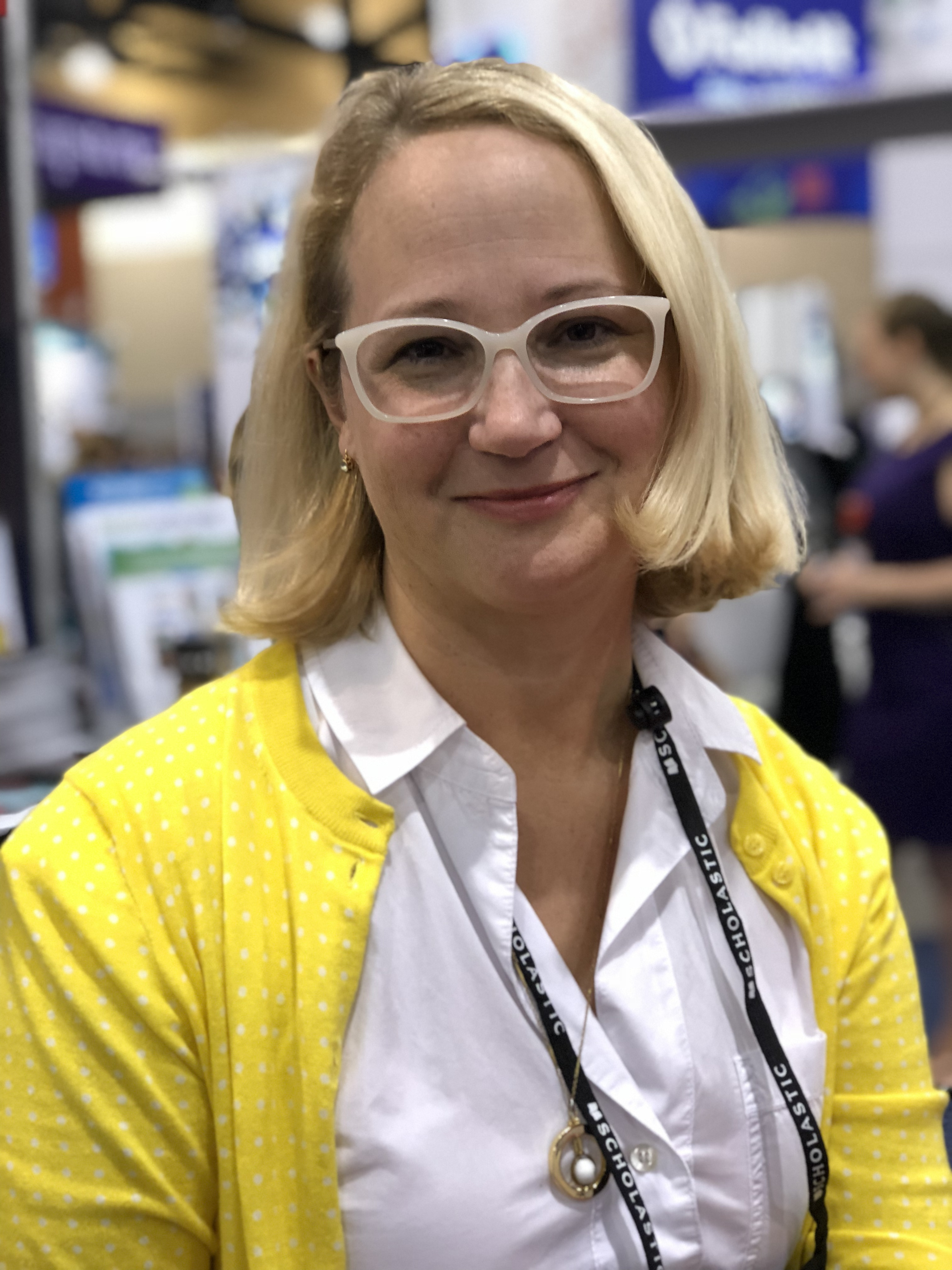
Jennifer Holm's first book, Our Only May Amelia, was sparked by her great aunt's diaries and won a Newbery Honor.

Author	Total number of Medals and Honors	Number of Newbery Medals	Newbery Medals	Number of Newbery Honors	Newbery Honors
Avi	3	1	2003	2	1991, 1992
Mary and Conrad Buff	3			3	1947, 1952, 1954
Beverly Cleary	3	1	1984	2	1978, 1982
Padraic Colum	3			3	1922, 1926, 1934
Susan Cooper	2	1	1976	1	1974
Christopher Paul Curtis	3	1	2000	2	1996, 2008
Alice Dalgliesh	3			3	1945, 1953, 1955
Meindert De Jong	5	1	1955	4	1954, 1954, 1957, 1959
Kate DiCamillo	3	2	2004, 2014	1	2001
Jeanette Eaton	4			4	1930, 1939, 1945, 1951
Eleanor Estes	4	1	1952	3	1943, 1944, 1945
Nancy Farmer	3			3	1995, 1997, 2003
Laura Amy Schlitz	2	1	2008	1	2013
Genevieve Foster	4			4	1942, 1945, 1950, 1953
Russell Freedman	4	1	1988	3	1992, 1994, 2005
Elizabeth Gray Vining	4	1	1943	3	1931, 1936, 1939
Virginia Hamilton	4	1	1975	3	1972, 1983, 1989
Charles Boardman Hawes	2	1	1924	1	1922
Marguerite Henry	3	1	1949	2	1946, 1948
Agnes Hewes	3			3	1931, 1934, 1937
Jennifer L. Holm	3			3	2000, 2007, 2011
Clara Ingram Judson	3			3	1951, 1954, 1957
Erin Entrada Kelly	3	2	2018, 2025	1	2021
E. L. Konigsburg	3	2	1968, 1997	1	1968
Joseph Krumgold	2	2	1954, 1960		
Lois Lenski	3	1	1946	2	1937, 1942
Lois Lowry	2	2	1990, 1994		
Eloise Jarvis McGraw	3			3	1953, 1962, 1997
Cornelia Meigs	4	1	1934	3	1922, 1929, 1933
Scott O'Dell	4	1	1961	3	1967, 1968, 1971
Anne Parrish	3			3	1925, 1931, 1951
Katherine Paterson	3	2	1978, 1981	1	1979
Gary Paulsen	3			3	1986, 1988, 1990
Kate Seredy	3	1	1938	2	1936, 1940
Isaac Bashevis Singer	3			3	1967, 1968, 1969
Zilpha Keatley Snyder	3			3	1968, 1972, 1973
Christina Soontornvat	3			3	2021, 2021, 2023
Elizabeth George Speare	3	2	1959, 1962	1	1984
Renée Watson	2	1	2026	1	2018
Laura Ingalls Wilder	5			5	1938, 1940, 1941, 1942, 1944
Jacqueline Woodson	4			4	2006, 2008, 2009, 2015

== See also ==
- Carnegie Medal for a children's or young-adult book published in the UK
- Michael L. Printz Award for a young-adult book published in the US
- Caldecott Medal for illustration of an American children's picture book
- Children's Literature Legacy Award for lifetime contribution to American children's literature
- Hans Christian Andersen Award for lasting contribution to children's literature
