= Thistle and Thyme =

1962 children's folklore collection

Thistle and Thyme: Tales and Legends from Scotland
- Author: Sorche Nic Leodhas
- Illustrator: Evaline Ness
- Language: English
- Genre: Children's fantasy
- Publisher: Holt
- Publication date: 1972
- Publication place: United States

Thistle and Thyme: Tales and Legends from Scotland is a 1962 collection of ten Scottish folklore tales by American author Sorche Nic Leodhas and illustrated by Evaline Ness. It is a companion book to an earlier collection of Scottish folklore by Leodhas called Heather and Broom: Tales of the Scottish Highlands. In the longest tale, The Laird's Lass and the Gobha's Son, the beautiful daughter of a laird falls in love with the son of a blacksmith (gobha); the girl's father forbids her from marrying the boy, so she turns to a wizard for help. The book was recognized with a Newbery Honor in 1964.

== Stories ==
- The Laird's Lass and the Gobha's Son
- St. Cuddy and the Grey Geese
- The Stolen Bairn and the Sidh
- The Lass Who Went Out at the Cry of Dawn
- The Changeling and the Fond Young Mother
- The Bride Who Out Talked the Water Kelpie
- The Drowned Bells of the Abbey
- The Beekeeper and the Bewitched Hare
- The Fisher Lad and the Mermaid's Ring
- Michael Scott and the Demon
