= Out of the Flame =

Novel by Eloise Lownsbery

- Author: Eloise Lownsbery
- Illustrator: Elizabeth Tyler Wolcott
- Language: English
- Genre: Children's literature / historical fiction
- Publisher: Longman, Green and Co.
- Publication date: 1931
- Publication place: United States

Out of the Flame is a 1931 children's historical fiction novel written by Eloise Lownsbery and illustrated by Elizabeth Tyler Wolcott. Set in sixteenth-century France, in the court of Francis I, it describes the education and adventures of Pierre, who is training to be a knight. The book received a Newbery Honor in 1932.
