= Elf Dog and Owl Head =

2023 children's novel by M.T. Anderson

- Author: M. T. Anderson
- Illustrator: Junyi Wu
- Language: English
- Genre: Children's fantasy
- Publisher: Candlewick Press
- Publication date: April 11, 2023
- Publication place: United States
- Pages: 240
- ISBN: 978-1-536-22281-4

Elf Dog and Owl Head is a 2023 children's fantasy novel written by American author M. T. Anderson and illustrated by Junyi Wu. Set during a global pandemic, it follows young Clay as he escapes into a fantasy world. While out wandering the woods on Mount Norumbega, Clay encounters the elf-hound Elphinore, who guides him into the magical Kingdom Under the Mountain.

== Reception ==
The book earned a Newbery Honor in 2024. Reviewers called special attention to Wu's illustrations and their contribution to the fantasy atmosphere of the book. Others commended Anderson's ability to weave together each character's different emotional state in a convincing fashion.
