= Children of the Soil =

Novel by Nora Burglon

Children of the Soil: A Story of Scandinavia
- Author: Nora Burglon
- Illustrator: Edgar Parin D'Aulaire
- Language: English
- Genre: Children's literature
- Publisher: Doubleday
- Publication date: 1932
- Publication place: United States

Children of the Soil: A Story of Scandinavia is a 1932 children's novel written by Nora Burglon and illustrated by Edgar Parin D'Aulaire. Set in Sweden in the early 1900s, it tells the story of a poor family, Nicolina, her brother Gulklumpen, and their mother, Olina, whose ability and hard work bring them success. The book received a Newbery Honor in 1933.
