= Across So Many Seas =

2024 children's book by Ruth Behar

- Author: Ruth Behar
- Language: English
- Genre: Children's literature
- Publisher: Nancy Paulsen Books
- Publication date: 2024
- Publication place: United States
- Pages: 272
- ISBN: 9780593323403

Across So Many Seas is a 2024 novel by Cuban-American author Ruth Behar. Spanning 500 years in the lives of four Sephardic Jewish girls, the book was inspired by Behar's family and Jewish ancestry.

== Plot summary ==
In 1492, young girl Benvenida and her family are banished during the expulsion of the Jews from Spain; the family leaves Toledo, Spain and eventually settles in Silivri. Generations later, after the Turkish War of Independence in 1923, Benvenida's descendant Reina is disowned after befriending a Muslim boy, Sadik, meeting with a group of Muslim boys, and playing her oud and singing for them, disobeying her father. To save face, her father coordinates an arranged marriage to a relative, and Reina is sent to live with her aunt in Cuba until she is old enough to marry.

Reina's daughter Alegra grows up to be a teacher, working in the countryside on Fidel Castro's literacy project. When Reina returns to her parents' house in the city, she learns that most other Jews have fled the country, and her parents have decided the family should flee also with the help of HIAS. Not needing papers, Reina departs for Miami first, leaving her parents behind.

In 2003, Alegra, Alegra's daughter Paloma, and Reina travel to Spain and visit the Sinagoga del Tránsito. Reina notices an oud on display, and the curator, Mari, says her father, Sadik, donated it to the museum. Overcome with emotion, Reina plays the oud while Paloma sings.

== Reception ==
The book earned a Newbery Honor in 2025, and was named to Kirkus Reviews Best Middle Grade Books list in 2024. The School Library Journal called the book a "moving historic tale", and Publishers Weekly said it was "a stunning portrayal of immigration and Jewish culture and religion that expounds upon the importance of remaining true to oneself, explores themes of prejudice and racism, and exposes the harm that bigotry can inflict".
