= The Cow-Tail Switch, and Other West African Stories =

Collection of West African folk tales by Harold Courlander

- Author: Harold Courlander; George Herzog
- Illustrator: Madye Lee Chastain
- Language: English
- Genre: Children's literature African folklore Folklore
- Publisher: Holt
- Publication date: 1947
- Publication place: United States
- Pages: 143

The Cow-Tail Switch, and Other West African Stories is a 1947 anthology of West African folklore curated by Harold Courlander and George Herzog and illustrated by Madye Lee Chastain. Several of the stories were previously published in other works. The book received a Newbery Honor in 1947.

== Stories ==
- The Cow-Tail Switch – recorded by Herzog (Liberia)
- Kaddo's Wall – recorded by Leo Frobenius, from Atlantis: Volksmärchen und Volksdichtungen Afrikas (Togo)
- Talk – recorded by Courtlander (Ashanti)
- The One You Don't See Coming – recorded by Herzog and Charles C. Blooah, from Jabo Proverbs from Eastern Liberia (Liberia)
- Kassa the Strong One – recorded by Frobenius, from Atlantis: Volksmärchen und Volksdichtungen Afrikas (Mende)
- Anansi's Fishing Expedition – recorded by R.S. Rattray, from Akan-Ashanti Folk Tales (Ghana)
- Younde Goes to Town – recorded by W.H. Barker and C. Sinclair, from West African Folk Talkes (Ghana)
- The Singing Tortoise – recorded by Barker and Sinclair, from West African Folk Talkes (Ghana)
- Time – recorded by Herzog (Liberia)
- The Messenger of Maftam – recorded by L. J. B. Bérenger-Féraud, from Les peuplades de la Sénégambie (Soninke)
- Guinea Fowl and Rabbit Get Justice – recorded by A.W. Cardinall from Tales Told in Togoland (Togo)
- Anansi and Nothing Go Hunting for Wives – recorded by Barker and Sinclair, from West African Folk Talkes (Ghana)
- How Soko Brought Debt to Ashanti – recorded by Courtlander (Asante)
- Hungry Spider and the Turtle – recorded by Courtlander (Asante)
- Throw Mountains – recorded by Courtlander (Ghana)
- Ansige Karamba, the Glutton – recorded by Frobenius (Karamba)
- Don't Shake Hands with Everybody – recorded by Herzog and Blooah, from Jabo Proverbs from Eastern Liberia (Liberia)

== Reception ==
In addition to earning a Newbery Honor, the book was well-received. The Horn Book Magazine named it one of the best books of 1947 in the Folk and Fairy Tales category. The New York Times believed the book would be compelling to adults, as well, saying parents should read the stories out loud so "the whole family will enjoy their special flavor". In his review, folklorist William Bascom judged that "presents authoritative illustrations and comments on authentic African tales". Anthropologist Melville J. Herskovits had high praise for the book, saying "What we have in this have in this work, in short, comprises a form of "applied anthropology” whose worth, as such, is too often unrecognized by anthropologists." Reviewers also complimented Chatain's visuals: Book Links' review called Chastain’s woodcuts “beautifully wrought”, and Alice Dalgliesh, writing for Parents, said they were "decorative and authentic". Dalgliesh also said Talk was the standout story of the anthology.
