= Maizy Chen's Last Chance =

2022 children's book by Lisa Yee

- Author: Lisa Yee
- Language: English
- Genre: Children's literature
- Publisher: Random House
- Publication date: February 1, 2022
- Publication place: United States
- Pages: 288
- Awards: Asian/Pacific American Awards for Literature (2023)
- ISBN: 978-1-9848-3025-8

Maizy Chen's Last Chance is a 2022 middle-grade novel by Chinese American author Lisa Yee. In the novel, 11-year-old Maizy travels from California to Minnesota to spend the summer with her grandparents, where they run Golden Palace, the family restaurant. As she spends time caring for her ailing grandfather, she learns more about the restaurant's founder, Lucky, her great-great-grandfather, and his life as a Chinese immigrant in the late 19th century.

In 2022, it was a finalist for the National Book Award for Young People's Literature. The following year, it won the Asian/Pacific American Awards for Literature (Children category) and earned a Newbery Honor.
