= Nasuġraq Rainey Hopson =

Iñupiat children's-book author from Alaska

- Born: Utqiagvik, Alaska
- Education: California State Polytechnic University, Humboldt
- Occupations: Writer, illustrator
- Writing career
- Notable awards: Newbery Honor (2024)
- Website: www.nasugraqhopson.com

Nasuġraq Rainey Hopson is an Iñupiat children's book author. After growing up in Point Hope, Alaska, she attended CalPoly Humbolt to study studio art; after graduating, she returned to Utqiagvik to teach middle school. Her debut novel, Eagle Drums, was released on September 12, 2023, and earned a Newbery Honor in 2024.

Hopson has also taught workshops on gardening in Utqiagvik; in 2015, she started a small farm, Gardens in the Arctic.

== Selected works ==
=== Books ===
- Eagle Drums (2023)

=== Short stories ===
- The Perils of Beige; in Boundless (2023)
- The Weight of a Name; in Tasting Light (2022)
