= Kate O'Shaughnessy =

American author

- Writing career
- Notable work: The Wrong Way Home
- Website: kloshaughnessy.com

Kate O'Shaughnessy is an American children's book author. Her books have been critically well-received: her second book Lasagna Means I Love You was named an ALSC notable book and included on the New York Public Library's Best Book of the Year list in 2023, and in 2025, her novel The Wrong Way Home received a Newbery Honor.

== Books ==
- The Lonely Heart of Maybelle Lane. 2021. ISBN 9781984893864.
- Lasagna Means I Love You. 2023. ISBN 9781984893901.
- The Wrong Way Home. 2025. ISBN 9780593650769.
