= The Big Tree of Bunlahy =

Children's short story collection comprising 13 books

The Big Tree of Bunlahy: Stories of My Own Countryside
- Author: Padraic Colum
- Illustrator: Jack Yeats
- Language: English
- Genre: Irish folklore
- Publisher: Macmillan
- Publication date: 1932
- Publication place: United States

The Big Tree of Bunlahy: Stories of My Own Countryside is a 1932 children's short story anthology collected by Padraic Colum and illustrated by Jack Yeats. It contains thirteen stories based on the tales told to the author in his hometown of Bunlahy, County Longford, Ireland, under the titular tree. It received a Newbery Honor in 1933.
