= The Moves Make the Man =

1984 novel by Bruce Brooks

The Moves Make The Man is a sports novel written by author Bruce Brooks that deals with many issues in society including racism, domestic violence, abuse, and family deaths. It was chosen best book of 1984 by School Library Journal (SLJ), ALA Notable Children's Book, notable book of the year New York Times, and won the Boston Globe-Horn Book Award and a Newbery Honor in 1985.

== Setting ==
The book is set in North Carolina around the time of the Civil Rights Movement, in 1961. It is written in first person and narrated by an African-American child named Jerome Foxworthy, who goes by the nickname of Jayfox. He is the only African-American in his school and going through problems being forced to integrate. He covers the stories leading up to the relationship between him and a young white boy named Braxton Rivers III, otherwise known as Bix: about when he first saw him playing baseball, Bix's freaking out in Home Ec class, and teaching him basketball on a court in the woods at night. Braxton is a child who never says anything that is not a truth, which brings him problems others cannot understand, and eventually he runs away. The book covers problems happening in both his and Jerome's families. This book was published by Harper & Row.

== Characters ==
Jerome. Jerome the narrator and main character is a teenage African American male and loves to play basketball. He is being raised by a single mother. He meets Bix (Braxton Rivers) in a Home Economics class he has to take after it is discovered his mom has been injured and Jerome needs to learn to take care of his older siblings.

Bix whose real name is Braxton Rivers, is a friend of Jerome. Bix used to tell the truth but he stops after he finds out how the truth hurt his mother and those around him. Bix loved baseball, but Jerome helped him learn how to play basketball and not 'bounceball'. One day Bix had played a game of one-on-one against his stepfather to earn the right to see his mother in the mental hospital.

== Reception ==
The novel received a starred review from Kirkus Reviews, and positive reviews from the New York Times. The characterization of Jayfox received special praise : Kirkus Reviews described him as "a vibrant, eclectic, endearing narrator", and Mel Watkins, writing for the New York Times, described Jayfox as "one of the most charming, witty protagonists you're likely to encounter". It was listed as a Notable Book of the Year by the New York Times in 1984.

The novel received a Newbery Honor in 1985. It also won the 1985 Boston Globe-Horn Book Award.
