= A Fine White Dust =

1986 book by Cynthia Rylant

- Author: Cynthia Rylant
- Language: English
- Genre: Children's novel
- Publisher: Bradbury
- Publication date: 1986
- Publication place: United States
- Media type: Hardback (Bradbury) / Paperback (Dell)

A Fine White Dust is a 1986 children's novel written by Cynthia Rylant about a young boy's struggle with his faith. A traveling preacher visits 13-year-old Pete Cassidy's rural North Carolina town and during a revival, the preacher blesses Pete; Pete is born again and becomes entralled with the preacher. The preacher asks Pete to leave town with him after the town's last revival, and Pete agrees. When the time to leave arrives, Pete discovers the preacher has skipped town with a local waitress. Disillusioned, Pete turns to his family and friends to restore his faith. This was Rylant's first Newbery recognition, earning a Newbery Honor in 1987.
