= One-Eyed Cat =

1984 children's book by Paula Fox

- Author: Paula Fox
- Language: English
- Genre: Children's novel
- Publisher: Bradbury
- Publication date: 1984
- Publication place: United States

One-Eyed Cat is a 1984 children's novel by Paula Fox. Set in 1935 New York during the Great Depression, it follows a young boy's attempts to emulate his role-model minister father. It was a Newbery Honor book in 1985, Fox's second after The Slave Dancer in 1973.

== Plot summary ==
10-year-old Ned Wallis struggles to live up to the example set by his minister father. Ned's uncle buys him an air rifle as a birthday present, but his pacifist father seizes it, telling Ned he can have the gun when he is older. Ned steals the gun that night and shoots at a gray shape near the family barn, but becomes paranoid that someone was watching from the family house.

Later, Ned visits his neighbor, Mr. Scully, and the two notice a gray cat with one eye, which they begin to care for. Gradually, Ned convinces himself that this cat is the shape he shot near the barn and begins to feel guilty. Mr. Scully suffers a stroke and dies, and Ned is no longer able to care for the cat.

While out walking one night, Ned is joined by his mother, and the two happen upon the one-eyed cat, the cat's mate, and the pair's kittens. Guilt-stricken, Ned confesses to his mother about taking the rifle and shooting the cat; his mother tells him she saw him from the house, and empathizes with Ned's feeling of inadequacy from trying to live up to his father, as she too felt the same way when they were first married.
