= Eagle Drums =

2023 children's novel by Nasuġraq Rainey Hopson

- Author: Nasuġraq Rainey Hopson
- Illustrator: Nasuġraq Rainey Hopson
- Language: English
- Genre: Children's literature
- Publisher: Roaring Book Press
- Publication date: September 12, 2023
- Publication place: United States
- ISBN: 9781250750655

Eagle Drums is a 2023 children's novel written by Iñupiat author Nasuġraq Rainey Hopson. It is an origin story for the Messenger Feast tradition. Young hunter-boy Piŋa is captured by the shape-shifting eagle Savik, who offers him the choice between death and captivity. Choosing imprisonment, Piŋa is taken to meet Mother Eagle, who teaches him lessons in crafts such as dancing, singing, and storytelling, deepening Piŋa's understanding of the natural world. When Piŋa is freed, he returns to help his people prepare for a great celebration.

The book received a Newbery Honor and American Indian Youth Literature award in 2024. Critics praised Hopson's descriptions of the tundra setting and the Iñupiat culture, as well as her illustrations.
