= Little Blacknose =

1929 book by Hildegarde Swift

Little Blacknose: The Story of a Pioneer
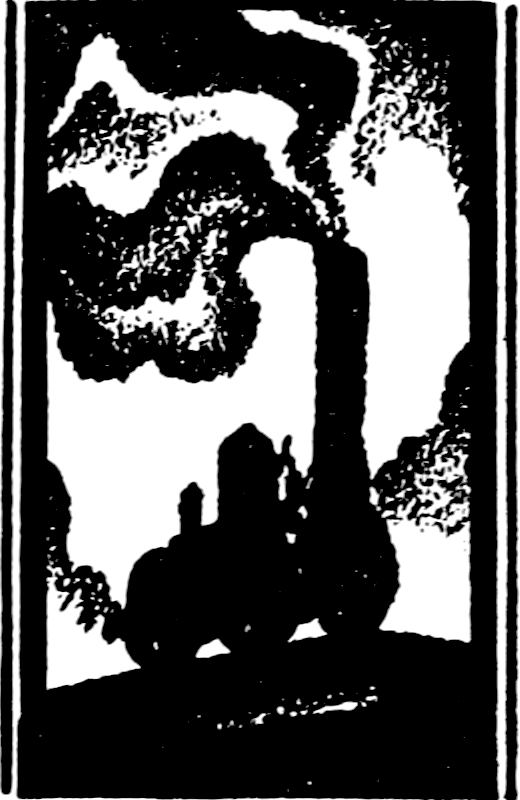
- Frontispiece
- Author: Hildegarde Swift
- Illustrator: Lynd Ward
- Language: English
- Genre: Children's literature / Historical fiction
- Publisher: Harcourt
- Publication date: 1929
- Publication place: United States
- Pages: 149
- OCLC: 1467263

Little Blacknose: The Story of a Pioneer is a 1929 children historical fiction book written by Hildegarde Swift and illustrated by Lynd Ward. The book tells the story of the DeWitt Clinton locomotive, the first steam locomotive to operate in New York, from its manufacture in 1831, rivalry-turned-friendship with British-built locomotive John Bull, exhibition at the 1883 Chicago World's Fair, and its retirement in Grand Central Station in 1928. It received a Newbery Honor in 1930.
