= Padraic Colum =

Irish writer

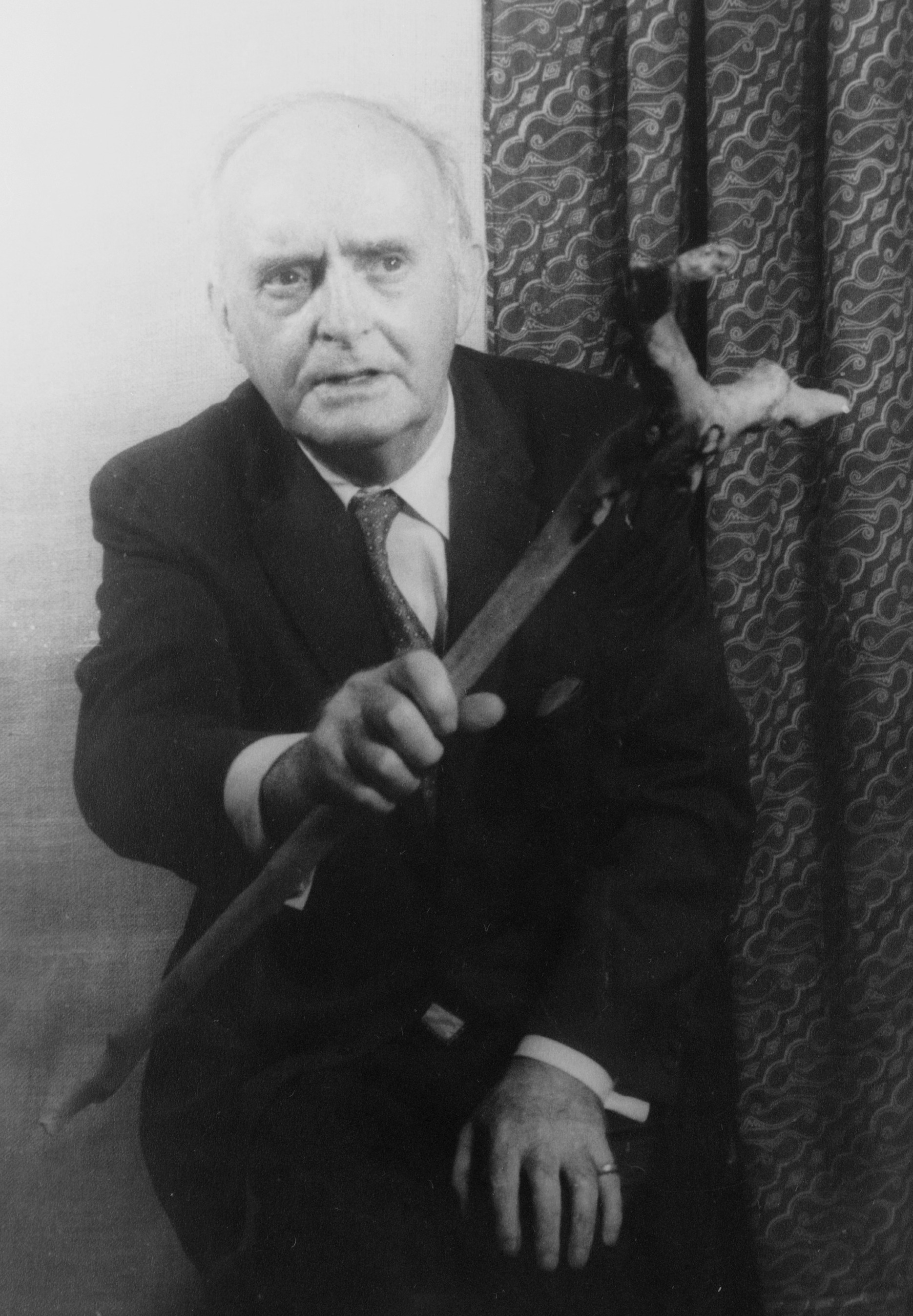
- Photographed by Carl Van Vechten, 1959.
- Born: Patrick Columb; 8 December 1881; Columcille, County Longford, Ireland
- Died: 11 January 1972 (aged 90); Enfield, Connecticut, United States
- Education: University College Dublin
- Spouse: Mary Maguire
- Writing career
- Period: 1902–58
- Notable works: The Saxon Shillin, The King of Ireland's Son

Padraic Colum (8 December 1881 – 11 January 1972) was an Irish poet, novelist, dramatist, biographer, playwright, children's author and collector of folklore. He was one of the leading figures of the Irish Literary Revival.

== Early life ==
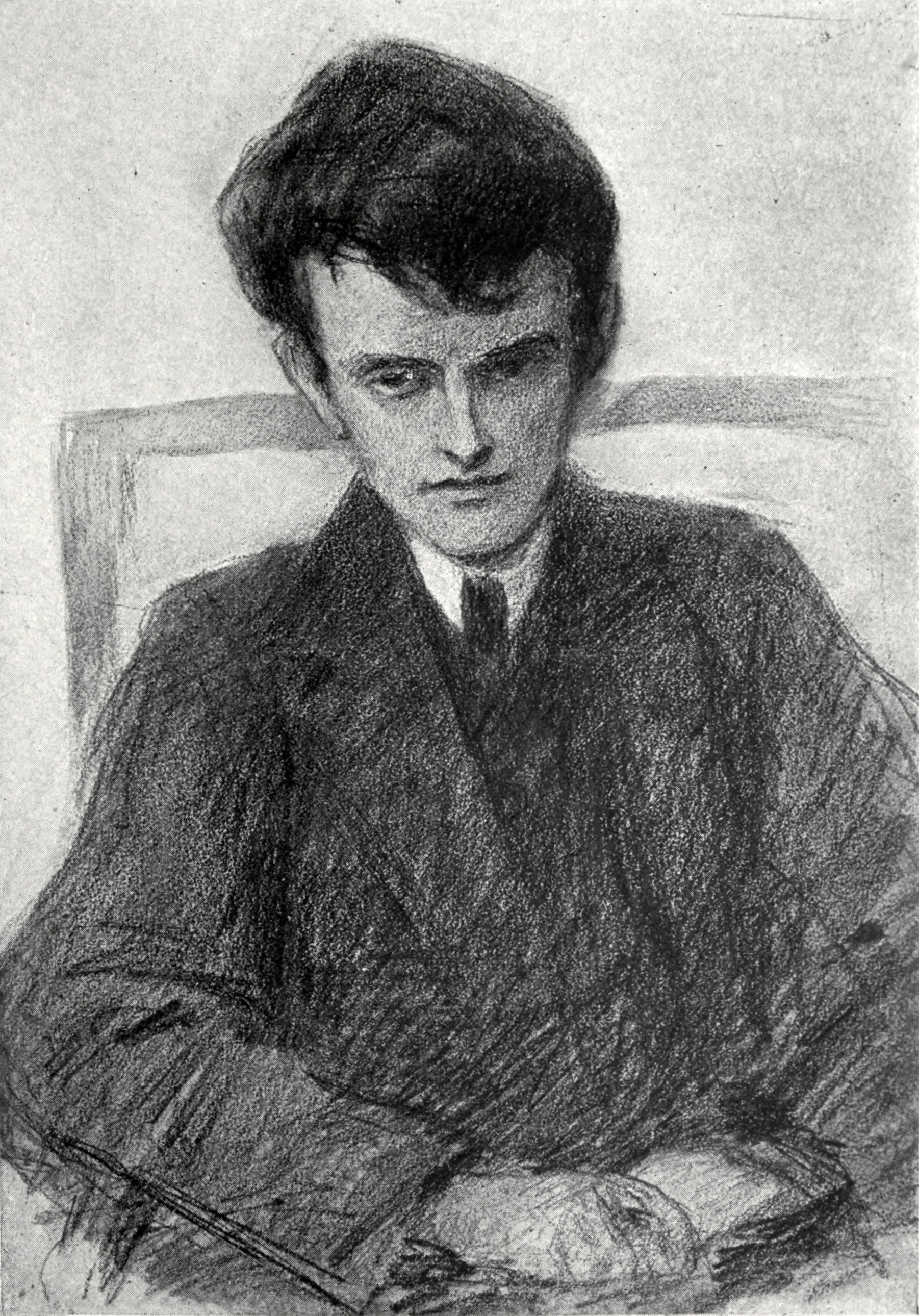
Portrait drawing of Colum by John B. Yeats, 1900s

Colum was born Patrick Columb in a County Longford workhouse, where his father worked. He was the first of eight children born to Patrick and Susan Columb.

When his father lost his job in 1889, he moved to the United States to participate in the Colorado gold rush. Padraic and his mother and siblings remained in Ireland, having moved to live with his grandmother in County Cavan. When his father returned in 1892, the family moved to Glasthule, near Dublin, where his father was employed as Assistant Manager at Sandycove and Glasthule railway station. His son attended the local national school.

When Susan Columb died in 1897, the family was temporarily split up. Padraic (as he would be known) and one brother remained in Dublin, while their father and remaining children moved back to Longford. Colum finished school the following year and at the age of seventeen, he passed an exam for and was awarded a clerkship in the Irish Railway Clearing House. He stayed in this job until 1903.

During this period, Colum started to write and met a number of the leading Irish writers of the time, including W. B. Yeats, Lady Gregory and Æ. He also joined the Gaelic League and was a member of the first board of the Abbey Theatre. He became a regular user of the National Library of Ireland, where he met James Joyce and the two became lifelong friends. During the riots caused by the Abbey Theatre's production of The Playboy of the Western World Colum's own father, Patrick Columb, was one of the protesters. Padraic himself was not engaged in the protests, although he did pay his father's fine afterwards.

He was awarded a five-year scholarship by a wealthy American benefactor, Thomas Hughes Kelly.

== Early poetry and plays ==
He was awarded a prize by Cumann na nGaedheal for his anti-enlistment play, The Saxon Shillin'. Through his plays he became involved with the National Theatre Society and became involved in the founding of the Abbey Theatre, writing several of its early productions. His first play, Broken Soil (revised as The Fiddler's House) (1903) was performed by W. G. Fay's Irish National Dramatic Company. The Land (1905), was one of that theatre's first great public successes. He wrote another important play for the Abbey named Thomas Muskerry (1910).

His earliest published poems appeared in The United Irishman, a paper edited by Arthur Griffith. His first book, Wild Earth (1907) collected many of these poems and was dedicated to Æ. He published several poems in Arthur Griffith's paper, The United Irishman this time, with The Poor Scholar bringing him to the attention of W. B. Yeats. He became a friend of Yeats and Lady Gregory. In 1908, he wrote an introduction to the Everyman's Library edition of Edgar Allan Poe's Tales of Mystery & Imagination.

He collected Irish folk songs, and adapted some of them. In a letter to the Irish Times in April 1970, he claimed to be the author of the words of "She Moved Through the Fair" (the music being composed by Herbert Hughes), using only a single verse from an old County Donegal folk song. In the same correspondence, however, another music collector, Proinsias Ó Conluain, said he had recorded a "very old" song from Glenavy with words the same as the other three verses of "She Moved Through the Fair".

In 1911, with Mary Gunning Maguire, a student from UCD, and David Houston and Thomas MacDonagh, he founded the short-lived literary journal The Irish Review, which published work by Yeats, George Moore, Oliver St John Gogarty, and many other leading Revival figures.

In 1912 he married Maguire. Padraic taught at Pádraig Pearse's experimental school, Scoil Éanna in Rathfarnham, County Dublin and Mary Maguire taught at the girls' school, Scoil Íde (St. Ita's), which was set up in Cullenswood House, Ranelagh, Dublin, once Scoil Éanna had moved to Rathfarnham. At first the couple lived in the Dublin suburb of Donnybrook, where they held a regular Tuesday literary salon. They then moved to Howth, a small fishing village just to the north of the capital. In 1914, they travelled to the US for what was intended to be a visit of a few months but lasted most of the rest of their lives.

== Later life and work ==
In America, Colum took up children's writing and published a number of collections of stories for children, beginning with The King of Ireland's Son (1916). This book came about when Colum started translating an Irish folk tale from Gaelic because he did not want to forget the language. After it was published in the New York Tribune, Hungarian illustrator Willy Pogany suggested the possibility of a book collaboration, so Colum wove the folktale into a long, epic story. Three of his books for children were awarded retrospective citations for the Newbery Honor. A contract for children's literature with Macmillan Publishers made him financially secure for the rest of his life. Some other books he wrote are The Adventure of Odysseus (1918) and The Children of Odin (1920). These works are important for bringing classical literature to children.

He contributed to Emma Goldman's Mother Earth.

In 1922 he was commissioned to write versions of Hawaiian folklore for young people. This resulted in the publication of three volumes of his versions of tales from the islands. A first edition of the first volume (At the Gateways of the Day) was presented to US president Barack Obama by Taoiseach Enda Kenny on the occasion of his visit to Dublin, Ireland on 23 May 2011. Colum also started writing novels. These include Castle Conquer (1923) and The Flying Swans (1937). The Colums spent the years from 1930 to 1933 living in Paris and Nice, where Padraic renewed his friendship with James Joyce and became involved in the transcription of Finnegans Wake.

After their time in France, the couple moved to New York City, where they did some teaching at Columbia University and CCNY. Colum was a prolific author and published a total of 61 books, not counting his plays. He adopted the form of Noh drama in his later plays.

While in New York, he wrote the screenplay for the 1954 stop-motion animated film Hansel and Gretel. It was his only screenplay.

Mary died in 1957 and Padraic finished Our Friend James Joyce, which they had worked on together. It was published in 1958. Colum divided his later years between the United States and Ireland. In 1961 the Catholic Library Association awarded him the Regina Medal. He died in Enfield, Connecticut, age 90, and was buried in St. Fintan's Cemetery, Sutton.

In 1965, Colum sold the notebooks, manuscripts, galley proofs, and letters that were in his apartments in New York and Dublin to the Binghamton University Libraries. He wished to make whatever resources he could available to scholars of Irish literature and history.

Asked how to say his name, he told The Literary Digest the last name was the same as the word column. "In my first name, the first a has the sound of au. The ordinary pronunciation in Irish is pau'drig."

== Selected works ==
- (1902) The Saxon Shillin' (Play)
- (1903) Broken Sail (Play)
- (1905) The Land (Play)
- (1907) Wild Earth (Book)
- (1907) The Fiddlers' House (Play)
- (1910) Thomas Muskerry (Play)
- (1912) My Irish Year (Book)
- (1916) The King of Ireland's Son (New Sample of old Irish Tales)
- (1917) Mogu the Wanderer (Play)
- (1918) The Children's Homer, (Novel) Collier Books, ISBN 978-0-02-042520-5
- (1918) The Boy Who Knew What The Birds Said
- (1920) The Boy Apprenticed to an Enchanter, (Novel) The Macmillan Company
- (1920) Children of Odin: Nordic Gods and Heroes
- (1921) The Golden Fleece and the Heroes Who Lived Before Achilles, (Novel), Ill. by Willy Pogany The Macmillan company
- (1923) The Six Who Were Left in a Shoe (Children's Story)
- (1923) Castle Conquer (Novel)
- (1924) The Island of the Mighty: Being the Hero Stories of Celtic Britain Retold from the Mabinogion, Ill. by Wilfred Jones, The Macmillan Company
- (1924) At the Gateways of the Day (Tales and legends of Hawaii)
- (1924) The Peep-Show Man, The Macmillan Company
- (1925) The Bright Islands (Tales and legends of Hawaii V2)
- (1929) Balloon (Play)
- (1929) The Girl who Sat by the Ashes
- (1930) Old Pastures
- (1932) Poems (collected) Macmillan & Co
- (1933) The Big Tree of Bunlahy: Stories of My Own Countryside (Children's stories) Ill. by Jack Yeats
- (1937) Legends of Hawaii
- (1937) The Story of Lowry Maen (Epic Poem)
- (1943) The Frenzied Prince (Compilation of Irish Tales)
- (1957) The Flying Swans (Novel)
- (1958) Our Friend James Joyce (Memoir) (With Mary Colum)
- (1963) Moytura: A Play for Dancers (Play)
- (1965) Padraic Colum Reading His Irish Tales and Poems (Album, Folkways Records)

As screenwriter:

- (1954) Hansel and Gretel

As editor:

- (1922) Anthology of Irish Verse Liveright, 1948; Kessinger Publishing, LLC, 2009, ISBN 978-1-4374-8759-6
- (1923) The Arabian Nights: Tales of Wonder and Magnificence; The Macmillan Company
- (1954) A Treasury of Irish Folklore: The Stories, Traditions, Legends, Humor, Wisdom, Ballads, and Songs of the Irish People; Crown Publishers
- (1964) Roofs of Gold: Poems to Read Aloud, The Macmillan Company
