= The Golden Fleece and the Heroes Who Lived Before Achilles =

1921 children's mythology book by Padraic Colum

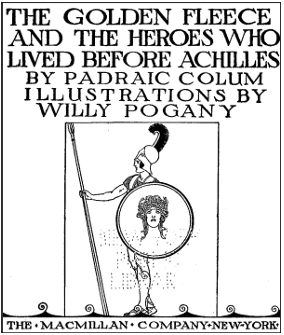
- Title page for The Golden Fleece and the Heroes Who Lived Before Achilles (1921)
- Author: Padraic Colum
- Illustrator: Willy Pogany
- Language: English
- Genre: Mythology
- Publisher: Macmillan
- Publication date: December 1921
- Publication place: United States
- Pages: 289

The Golden Fleece and the Heroes Who Lived Before Achilles is a children's book by Padraic Colum, a retelling of Greek myths. The book, illustrated by Willy Pogany, was first published in 1921 and was a Newbery Honor recipient in 1922. The central myth retold is that of Jason and the Argonauts in their quest for the Golden Fleece and the aftermath. Woven into it are other myths, including the myths of Persephone and Prometheus, told by the poet Orpheus during the voyage.
