= Bruce Brooks =

Author of young-adult and children's literature

Bruce Brooks (born September 23, 1950) is an American writer of young adult and children's literature.

== Background ==
Brooks, born in Richmond, Virginia, lived most of his young life in North Carolina as a result of parental divorce. Brooks credits moving around multiple times between the two locations with making him a keen observer of social situations. Switching schools often and having to make new friends evolved his ability to tell good stories. He graduated from the University of North Carolina at Chapel Hill in 1972, and the Iowa Writers' Workshop at the University of Iowa in 1980. Before earning a living as a writer, Brooks had worked as a letterpress operator and a journalist for magazines and newspapers. Brooks has reported a very diverse list of influences, like Charles Dickens, Henry James, P.G. Wodehouse and Raymond Chandler. He lives with Ginee Seo in Berkeley, California.

== Acclaim ==
The Moves Make the Man was chosen best book of 1984 by School Library Journal (SLJ), ALA Notable Children's Book, notable book of the year The New York Times, and won the Boston Globe-Horn Book Award and a Newbery Honor in 1985.

Midnight Hour Encores was chosen best book of 1986 by SLJ, a best book for young adults by the ALA, Horn Book Fanfare Honor List book in 1987, teacher's choice by the National Council of Teachers of English that same year, a young adult choice by the International Reading Association in 1988, and an ALA Booklist "best of the 1980s" book for young adults.

No Kidding was cited as a Best Books for Young Adults by the ALA, ALA Booklist Young Adult Editor's Choice, a Best Book by SLJ, and a Notable Children's Trade Book in social studies.

Everywhere was a Notable Children's Book by the ALA, and a Best Book by SLJ.

== Works ==
=== Fiction ===
- The Moves Make the Man (Harper Keypoint Books, 1984)
- Midnight Hour Encores (Harper, 1986)
- No Kidding (Harper, 1989)
- Everywhere (HarperCollins, 1990)
- What Hearts (HarperCollins, 1992)
- Asylum for Nightface (New York: Laura Geringer Books/HarperCollins, 1996)
- The Wolf Bay Wings, published by Laura Geringer – featuring a youth hockey team
1. Woodsie (1997)
2. Zip (1997)
3. Cody (1997)
4. Boot (1998)
- Each a Piece, illustrated by Elena Pavlov (HarperCollins, 1998) – "Rhyming text and illustrations with some cut-outs reveal that things are often more than they seem at first." OCLC 29846078
- Vanishing (Laura Geringer, 1999)
- Throwing Smoke (Scholastic Books, 2000)
- All That Remains (Atheneum Books, 2001)
- Dolores: Seven Stories About Her (Laura Geringer, 2002)

=== Nonfiction ===
- On the Wing: The Life of Birds from Feathers to Flight (Scribner's, 1989)
- Knowing Nature, published by Farrar, Straus and Giroux in association with Thirteen/WNET, illustrated
  - Predator! (1991)
  - Nature by Design (1991)
  - Making Sense: Animal Perception and Communication (1993)
- Boys Will Be (Henry Holt & Co., 1993)
- Those Who Love the Game: Glenn "Doc" Rivers on life in the NBA and elsewhere, Brooks and Doc Rivers (Henry Holt, 1993), OCLC 29764992
