= Hildegarde Swift =

American children's author (1890–1977)

- Born: January 10, 1890; Clinton, New York, USA
- Died: January 10, 1977 (aged 87); Redlands, California, USA
- Occupation: Author
- Spouse: Arthur L. Swift
- Children: 2
- Writing career
- Genres: Children's Literature, Biographies

Hildegarde H. Swift (January 10, 1890 – January 10, 1977) was a writer of children's books. One of her books, Little Blacknose received the Newbery Honor Medal. She is best known for her book The Railroad to Freedom. She won the Newbery Honor in 1933.

== Biography ==
Hildegarde Swift was born in Clinton, New York on January 10, 1890. Her father, Author S. Hoyt was an English Literature professor at Hamilton College. In her younger years, she had private tutors and attended European boarding schools. She later graduated from Auburn High School, moving on to further her education and graduate from Smith College. She continued her studies at the New York School of Social Work where she worked with children, which she credits gave her, her "first real knowledge of children."

She married Arthur L. Swift, a pastor from New York. Their first son Hewson H. Swift was born November 8, 1920. In her later years, she taught children's literature at the New School for Social Research. In 1929, she began to write children's books.

Swift died in Redlands, California on January 10, 1977, aged 87.

== Legacy ==
Swift's book The Little Red Lighthouse and the Great Gray Bridge sold 2 million copies. After the United States Coast Guard's plans to tear down the Little Red Lighthouse in Manhattan, New York, Swift's book was used by fans to help make the site a national landmark.

Eleanor Roosevelt praised Swift for admonishing young people to care for the wilderness in her writings.

== Works ==
- Little Blacknose: The Story of a Pioneer (1929)
- The Railroad to Freedom (1933)
- House by the Sea (1938)
- The Little Red Lighthouse and the Great Gray Bridge, illustrated by Lynd Ward (1942)
- North Star Shining (1947)
- From the Eagle's Wing: A Biography of John Muir
- The Edge of April: A Biography of John Burroughs (1957)
