= Leader by Destiny =

1938 children's biography of George Washington by Jeanette Eaton

Leader by Destiny: George Washington, Man and Patriot
- Author: Jeanette Eaton
- Illustrator: Jack Manley Rosé
- Language: English
- Genre: Children's literature
- Publisher: Harcourt
- Publication date: 1938
- Publication place: United States

Leader by Destiny: George Washington, Man and Patriot is a 1938 fictionalized children's biography of George Washington written by Jeanette Eaton and illustrated by Jack Manley Rosé. Beginning in 1747, when Washington was 15, it covers the major events of Washington's life, such as the French and Indian Wars, First and Second Continental Congress, his command of the Continental Army during the American Revolutionary War, and his time as the first President of the United States.

The book received a Newbery Honor in 1939, Eaton's second of four Honors (1930, 1945, and 1951.)
