= Madame Roland =

French revolutionary (1754–1793)

Marie-Jeanne Roland de la Platière
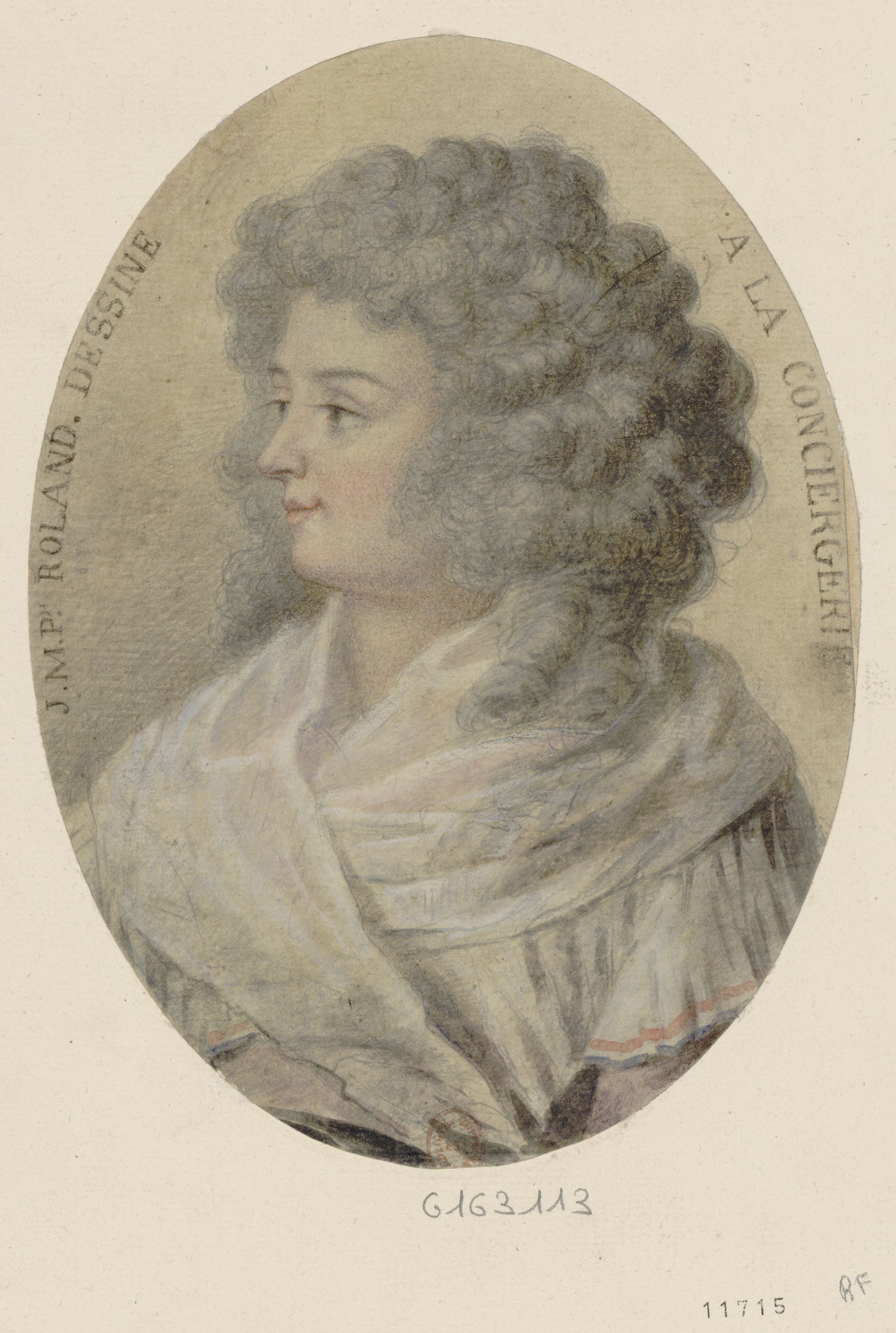
- Madame Roland in the Conciergerie, shortly before her execution
- Born: Marie-Jeanne Phlipon; 17 March 1754; Paris, Kingdom of France
- Died: 8 November 1793 (aged 39); Place de la Révolution, Paris, French First Republic
- Occupations: political activist, salonnière, writer
- Spouse: Jean-Marie Roland de la Platière (m. 1780; died 1793)
- Children: Eudora Roland de la Platière

Signature
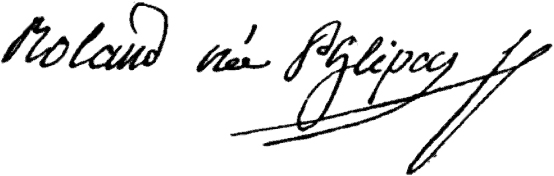

Marie-Jeanne "Manon" Roland de la Platière (Paris, March 17, 1754 – Paris, November 8, 1793), born Marie-Jeanne Phlipon, and best known under the name Madame Roland (French pronunciation: [madam ʁɔlɑ̃]) was a French revolutionary, salonnière and writer.

From a young age Roland was interested in philosophy and political theory and studied a broad range of writers and thinkers. She was however dissatisfied with the opportunities available to her as a woman. After marrying the economist Jean-Marie Roland de la Platière, she developed with him a husband and wife team which made it possible for her to engage in writing and research.

She moved from Paris to Lyon, where she initially led a quiet and unremarkable life as a provincial intellectual with her husband. She became actively involved in politics when the French Revolution broke out in 1789. She spent the first years of the revolution in Lyon, where her husband was elected to the city council. During this period she developed a network of contacts with politicians and journalists. Her reports on developments in Lyon in letters to people in her network were published in national revolutionary newspapers.

In 1791 the couple settled in Paris, where Madame Roland soon established herself as a leading figure within the political group the Girondins, one of the more moderate revolutionary factions. She was known for her intelligence, astute political analyses and her tenacity, and was a good lobbyist and negotiator. The salon she hosted in her home several times a week was an important meeting place for politicians. However, she was also convinced of her own intellectual and moral superiority and alienated important political leaders like Robespierre and Danton.

Unlike the feminist revolutionaries Olympe de Gouges and Etta Palm, Madame Roland was not an advocate for political rights for women. She accepted that women should play a very modest role in public and political life. Even during her lifetime, many found this position difficult to reconcile with her own active involvement in politics and her important role within the Girondins.

When her husband unexpectedly became Minister of the Interior in 1792, her political influence grew. She had control over the content of ministerial letters, memorandums and speeches, was involved in decisions about political appointments, and was in charge of a bureau set up to influence public opinion in France. She was both admired and reviled, and particularly hated by the sans-culottes of Paris. The publicists Marat and Hébert conducted a smear campaign against Madame Roland as part of the power struggle between the Girondins and the more radical Jacobins and Montagnards. In June 1793, she was the first Girondin to be arrested during the Terror and was guillotined a few months later.

Madame Roland wrote her memoirs while she was imprisoned in the months before her execution. They are – like her letters – a valuable source of information about the first years of the French Revolution.

== Early years ==
=== Childhood ===
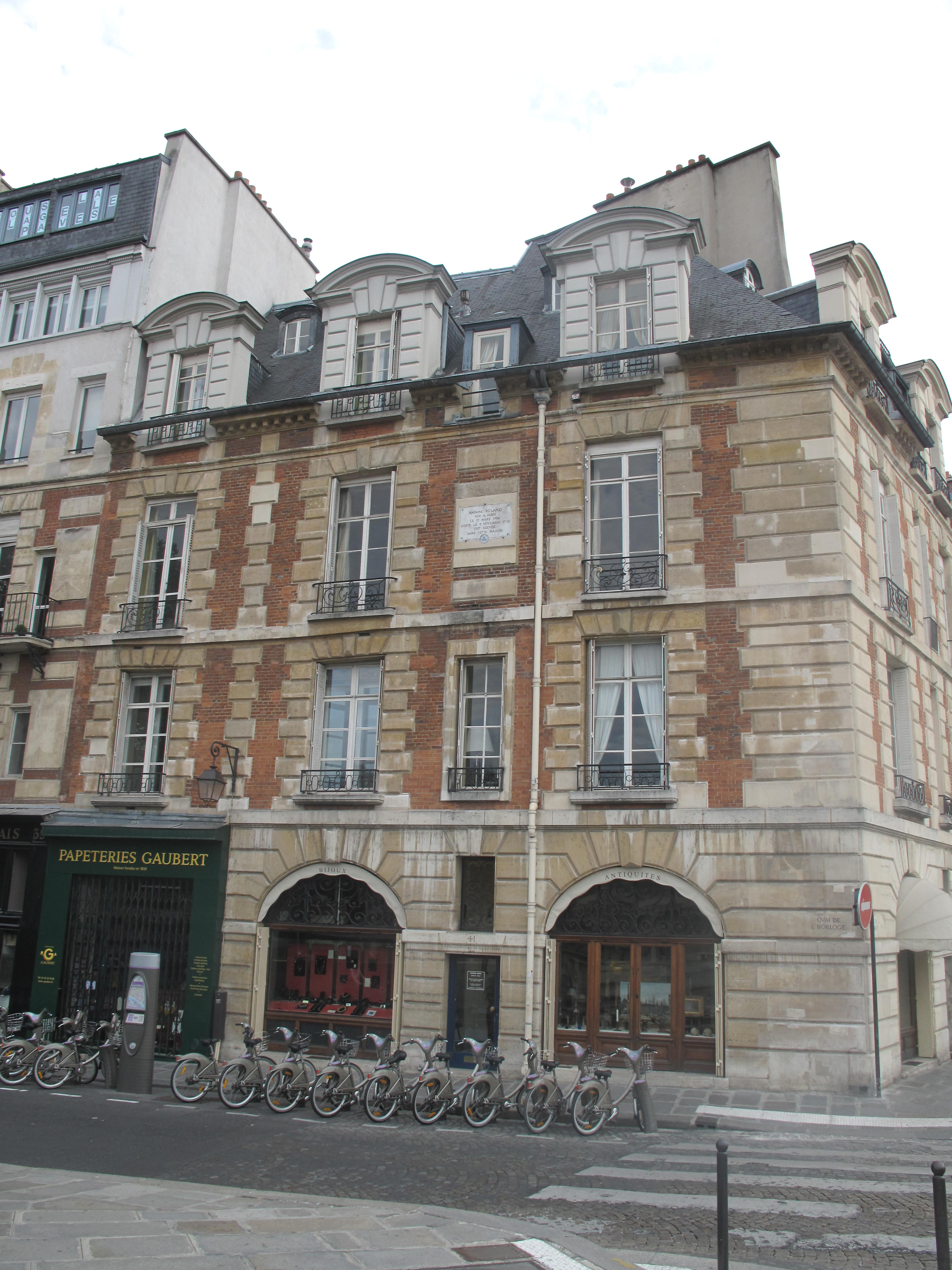
House on the Quai de l'Horloge in Paris, where Manon Roland lived as a child

Marie-Jeanne Phlipon, known as Manon, (Note: According to some sources - and the Bibliothèque Nationale de France - her first name was Jeanne-Marie. The biographies written about her give Marie-Jeanne a first name.) was the daughter of Pierre Gatien Phlipon, an engraver, and Marguerite Bimont, daughter of a haberdasher. Her father had a successful business and the family lived in a comfortable environment on the Quai de l'Horloge in Paris. She was the couple's only surviving child; six siblings died when they were young. The first two years of her life she lived with a wet nurse in Arpajon, a small town south-east of Paris.

Manon taught herself to read as a five-year-old and during the catechism lessons, the local priests noticed she was very intelligent. Therefore, and because she was an only child, she received more education than was customary for a girl from her social background at that time; however, it still fell short of the level of education a boy would have received. Teachers came to the family home for subjects such as calligraphy, history, geography and music. Her father taught her drawing and art history, an uncle who was a priest gave her some Latin lessons and her grandmother, who had been a governess, took care of spelling and grammar. In addition, she learned from her mother how to run a household.

As a child, she was very religious. At her own request, she lived in a convent for a year to prepare herself for her first communion when she was eleven. Only a few years later she would begin to question the doctrines of the Roman Catholic Church. Although she eventually turned away from the church, she continued to believe all her life in the existence of God, the immortality of the soul, and the moral obligation to do good. Her ideas are very close to deism.

Her father's workshop was attached to the family home and his adolescent apprentices were part of the household. As a child she was sexually harassed by one of the apprentices who tried to make her fondle him, which she found very frightening. She told her mother about the incident and from that point, the interaction between Manon and the apprentices was more closely watched.

=== Studying and writing ===
After returning home from the convent, she received little additional formal education but continued to read and study; she was largely an autodidact. She read books on all subjects: history, mathematics, agriculture and law. She developed a passion for the classics; like many of her contemporaries, she was inspired by the biographies of famous Greeks and Romans in Plutarch's Vitae Parallelae (Parallel Lives).

Manon Phlipon's ideas on social relations in France were shaped, among other things, by a visit to acquaintances of her grandmother at the court of Versailles. She was not impressed by the self-serving behavior of the aristocrats she met. She found it remarkable that people were given privileges because of their family of birth rather than on merit. She immersed herself in philosophy, particularly in the works of Jean-Jacques Rousseau; his democratic ideas strongly influenced her thinking about politics and social justice. Rousseau was also very important to her in other areas. She later said that his books had shown her how to lead a happy and fulfilled life. Throughout her life she would regularly reread Rousseau's Julie, ou La Nouvelle Héloïse, and use it as a source of inspiration.

Madame Roland was frustrated by the limited opportunities available to women in eighteenth-century France. She expressed dissatisfaction in letters to friends, writing that she would have preferred to live in ancient Rome. . For a while, she seriously considered taking over her father's business. She corresponded with a number of erudite older men — mainly clients of her father — who acted as intellectual mentors. She started writing philosophical essays herself which she circulated in manuscript among her friends under the title Oeuvre des loisirs ("work for relaxation"). In 1777 she took part in an essay competition on the theme "How the education of women can help make men better". Her essay did not receive a prize.

== Before the revolution ==
=== Marriage ===
In the social milieu of the Phlipons, marriages were usually arranged; it was unusual for a young woman like Manon Phlipon, the only child of fairly prosperous parents, not to be married by the age of twenty. She received at least ten proposals of marriage, but rejected all of them. She had a brief romance with the writer Pahin de la Blancherie, which for her ended in a painful disappointment. A friend of her father, a widower of 56 with whom she corresponded about philosophical issues, asked her to come and live with him on his estate so that they could study philosophy together. She hinted to him that she might consider a platonic marriage, but nothing of the sort came about.

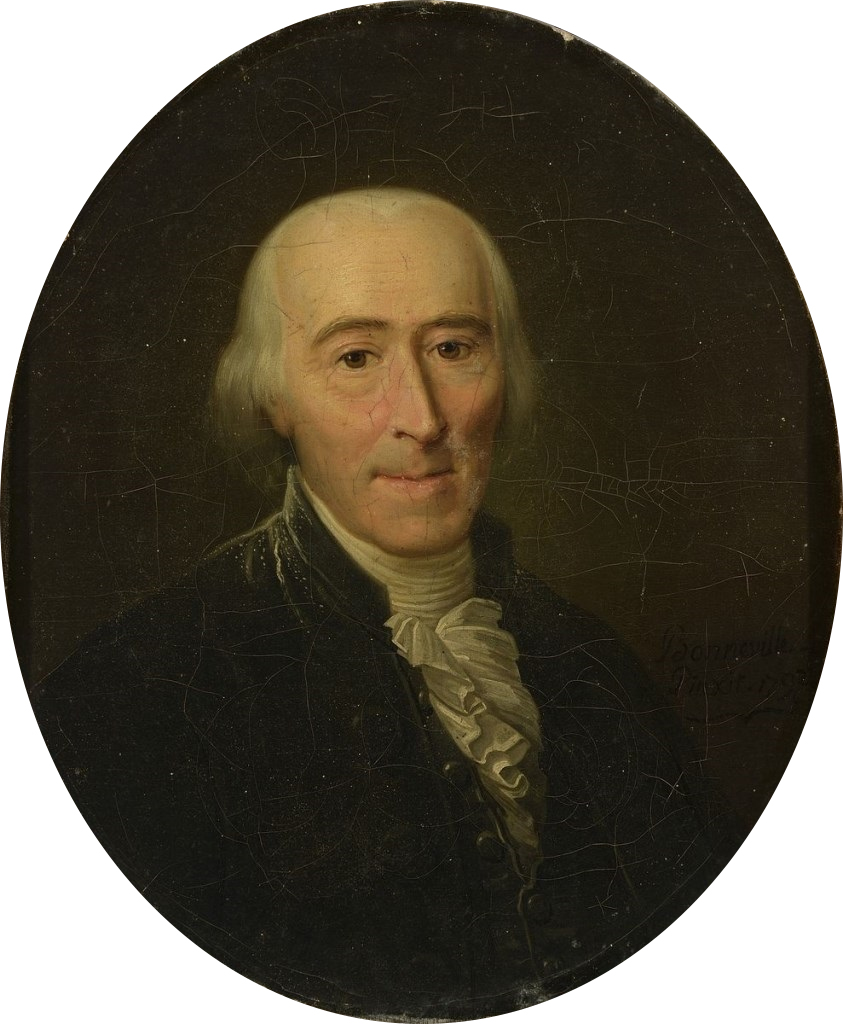
Jean-Marie Roland de la Platière, the husband of Manon Roland

In 1776, Manon Phlipon met Jean-Marie Roland de la Platière, who was twenty years her senior. (Note: The family name was originally only "Roland". An ancestor had added "de la Platière" as a reference to an estate owned by the family. Jean-Marie Roland used the noble-sounding version during the ancien régime, but abandoned it when noble titles were abolished during the revolution. (Reynolds, p.33)) He was Inspector de Manufactures in Picardy and as such charged with quality control of the products of local manufacturers and craftsmen. He was an expert in the field of production, trade and economic policy, especially of the textile industry. He was intelligent, well-read and well-traveled, but he was also known as a difficult human being: reluctant to take into consideration any opinions but his own and easily irritated. Because of this, he often did not succeed in implementing the economic reforms he favoured, and his career was not as successful as he believed he deserved.

The Roland family had once belonged to the lower nobility, but by the end of the 18th century no longer held a title. There was a clear difference in social status compared to Manon Phlipon's family of artisans and shopkeepers. This was her reason for refusing Roland's first marriage proposal in 1778. A year later she did accept. The wedding plans were initially kept secret because Roland expected objections from his family. By the standards of that time, this was a mésalliance: a marriage considered inappropriate due to the large difference in social status between the spouses.

They were married in February 1780 and initially lived in Paris, where Roland worked at the Ministry of the Interior. From the very first, Madame Roland helped her husband in his work, acting more or less as his secretary. In her spare time she attended lectures on natural history in the Jardin des Plantes, the botanical garden of Paris. Here she met Louis-Augustin Bosc d'Antic, a natural historian who remained a close friend until her death. Her friendship with François Xavier Lanthenas, later a parliamentarian, also dates from this time.

=== Amiens and Lyon ===
Chapter from the Dictionnaire des Arts et Métiers, written by the Rolands

After a year in Paris the couple moved to Amiens. Their only child Eudora was born there in 1781. Unusual for that time — but entirely in line with Rousseau's theories — Madame Roland breastfed her daughter herself instead of hiring a wet nurse. She wrote a particularly detailed and candid report of the birth and the problems with breastfeeding, and is one of the first women of this time to write openly about such matters. The report was published after her death.

The couple lived a very quiet life in Amiens and had few social contacts. In Paris, Madame Roland had already supported her husband in his work and their cooperation now developed further. At first she was mainly involved in copying texts and assisting his research; her role was clearly subordinate. In her memoirs she looks back on this situation with some resentment, but her letters from that period do not show that she objected at the time. Her involvement gradually increased; she began to edit and modify text, and eventually wrote major sections herself. Her husband apparently initially did not realize that some texts were hers and not his own. Within a few years, she developed into the better writer, which was also acknowledged by Jean-Marie Roland. In the end he fully accepted her as his intellectual equal and there was an equal partnership.

In 1784, Madame Roland visited Paris for a few weeks to acquire a peerage for her husband. The financial privileges associated with a title would allow him to give up his job as an inspector and focus entirely on writing and research. She discovered that she had a talent for lobbying and negotiating. The peerage did not materialise: in the course of his professional life her husband had too often antagonised his superiors. She did manage to obtain an appointment for him in Lyon that was less demanding than his post in Amiens and better paid. Before the move to Lyon, the couple visited England, where Madame Roland attended a debate in the House of Commons between the legendary political opponents William Pitt the Younger and Charles James Fox.

Although Lyon was Roland's official place of work the family usually lived in Villefranche-sur-Saône, about thirty kilometers north of Lyon. Madame Roland focused on the education of her daughter Eudora, who to her great disappointment turned out to be less interested in books and acquiring knowledge than she herself had been at that age. In the following years, she would occasionally in letters to friends (and in her memoirs) continue to call her daughter "slow" and lament that her child had such bad taste. Together with her husband she worked on the Encyclopédie méthodique — Dictionnaire des Arts et Métiers, a sequel to the Encyclopédie of Diderot and D'Alembert, which focussed on trade and industry. In 1787 the couple made a trip to Switzerland, where, at the request of Madame Roland, they also visited sites that had played a role in the life of Rousseau.

== The Revolution ==
=== From a distance: 1789–1791 ===
Throughout France, and especially in Paris, protests against the social, economic and political conditions were mounting. The Rolands were in many ways representative of the rising revolutionary elite. They had obtained their social position through work and not through birth, and resented the court in Versailles with its corruption and privileges. They deliberately chose a fairly sober, puritan lifestyle. They favoured a liberal economy and the abolition of old regulations, and advocated relief for the poor. When the French States General were convened in 1789, Madame Roland and her husband were involved in drawing up the local Cahier de Doléances, the document in which the citizens of Lyon could express their grievances about the political and economic system. Politics had played no major role in Madame Roland's correspondence before 1789, but in the course of that year she became more and more fascinated by political developments.

After the storming of the Bastille on July 14, 1789, her thinking radicalised quickly and there was a complete change in the tone and content of her letters. She was no longer interested in societal reform, but advocated revolution. Institutions from the old regime were no longer acceptable to her; now that the people had taken over sovereignty, a completely new form of government had to be developed. Unlike many other revolutionaries, she was quick to argue for the establishment of a republic. In her political thinking, Madame Roland was irreconcilably radical at this point in time. She was not inclined to compromise on anything; to achieve her revolutionary ideals she found the use of force, and even civil war, acceptable.

During the first eighteen months of the French Revolution the Rolands were based in Lyon, although they still lived in Villefranche part of the time. Madame Roland soon became convinced that a counter-revolution was being plotted. She tried to mobilize her friends through her letters, not hesitating to spread unfounded rumours about events and about people she did not agree with. Meanwhile, it had become common knowledge in Lyon that the Rolands sympathized with the revolutionaries and had supported the establishment of radical political clubs. They were hated by representatives of the old elite because of this. She was happy when, on February 7, 1790, an uprising broke out in Lyon that led to the ousting of the city council and an increase of the number of men eligible to vote.

Madame Roland did not publicly take part in political discussions, but still managed to gain political influence during this period. She corresponded with a network of publicists and politicians, including the Parisian journalist Jacques Pierre Brissot, the future leader of the Girondins, and the lawyer Jean-Henri Bancal d'Issarts. In her letters she described and analyzed the developments in Lyon. At least on five occasions Brissot published excerpts from her letters as articles in his newspaper Le Patriote Francaise, so that her opinions were discussed outside Lyon. Luc-Antoine de Champagneux did the same in his newspaper Le courier de Lyon. She was one of the few female correspondents in the revolutionary press. Because her contributions were not published under her own name, but anonymously or as "a woman from the south", it is impossible to determine with certainty how many articles written by Madame Roland appeared in the press.

=== Activist and salonnière ===
In 1790, Jean-Marie Roland was elected in the city council of Lyon, where he advocated a moderate revolutionary administration. The Rolands now settled in Lyon, but in order to get money for revolutionary reforms, they left for Paris in 1791, for what should have been a short stay.

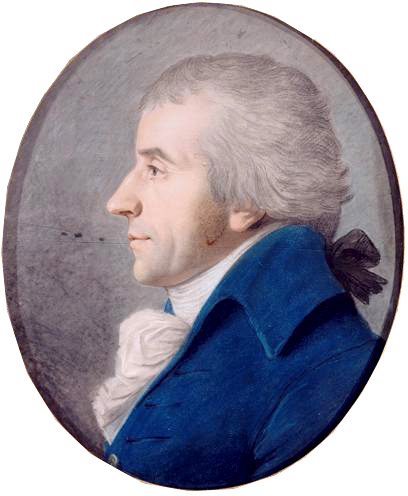
Jacques Pierre Brissot, journalist and later leader of the Girondins, published Madame Roland's articles in his newspaper and introduced her in revolutionary circles

Madame Roland soon became a well-known figure in political circles in Paris, especially thanks to Brissot, who introduced her everywhere. As always, she worked alongside her husband, although the routine copying and editing work was now done by an assistant, Sophie Grandchamp. Madame Roland wrote most of her husband's official letters and regretted that she could not go to the new National Assembly herself to argue the case of Lyon: women were admitted only to the public gallery. When she observed the debates from the gallery, it annoyed her that the conservatives were so much better and more eloquent in the debates than the revolutionaries, whom she considered ideologically superior. Outside the assembly, she was active as a lobbyist. Although Madame Roland could not participate directly in debates at the National Assembly, she continued to influence revolutionary politics through her writing and personal connections with political leaders. With Roland, she was a regular visitor at the Jacobin club (here, too women were only allowed access to the public gallery).

From April 1791 she hosted a salon in her home several times a week, attended by republicans from bourgeois circles. Among the visitors were Maximilien de Robespierre and the American revolutionary Thomas Paine. According to Madame Roland: "He spoke little, sniggered a great deal, uttered a few touches of sarcasm and never gave an opinion." She finally broke with him.

During these events, Madame Roland always sat at a table by the window, reading, writing letters or doing needlework. She never involved herself in the conversations going on around her but listened carefully. Her considerable political influence was not exerted by participating in public debate (which she found unseemly for a woman), but through letters and personal conversations. She was known for her sharp political analyses and her ideological tenacity, and was widely recognized as one of the most important people in the group around Brissot. She was always asked for advice on political strategy and she contributed to the content of letters, parliamentary bills and speeches. She was described by contemporaries as a charming woman and a brilliant conversationalist.

Madame Roland's salon is one of the main reasons why she is remembered but it may not have been a salon in the usual sense of the term. The gatherings she hosted were strictly political and not social in character; hardly any food or drink was served. They took place in the few hours between the end of the debates in the assembly and the beginning of the meetings in the Jacobin Club. There were also — apart from Madame Roland herself — no women present. This distinguished them from the events hosted by Louise de Kéralio, Sophie de Condorcet and Madame de Staël; although also attended by revolutionaries their gatherings were more like the aristocratic salons of the ancien régime, an impression that Madame Roland wanted to avoid at any cost.

=== Political ideas ===
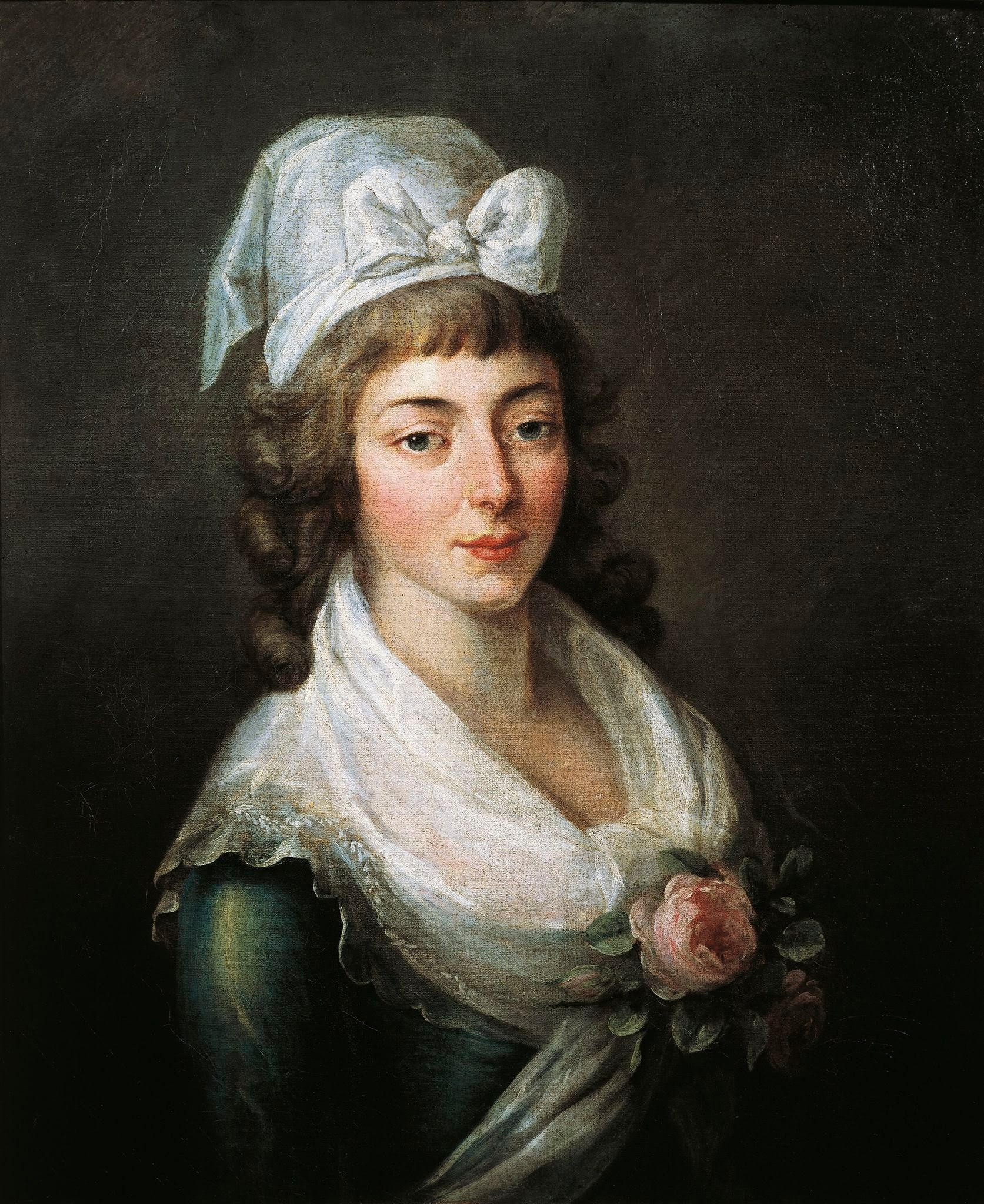
Madame Roland, unknown artist, Musée Lambinet

The name of Madame Roland is inextricably linked to the Girondins. Both she and her husband were considered to be part of the leadership of this political faction, also called the Brissotins after their leader Jacques Pierre Brissot. Originally, the Girondins — and also the Rolands — were part of the wider Jacobin movement. As the revolution progressed, they began to distance themselves from the Jacobins, who became dominated by radical Parisian leaders like Georges Danton and Jean-Paul Marat. The Girondins opposed the influence Paris had on national politics in preference to federalism; many of the Girondin politicians came from outside the capital. They belonged to the bourgeoisie and positioned themselves as the guardians of the rule of law against the lawlessness of the masses. In this aspect too they differed fundamentally from the Jacobins, who saw themselves as the representatives of the sans-culottes, the workers, and shopkeepers.

Madame Roland’s ideas on women and their rights closely followed the ideals articulated by Jean Jacques Rousseau, and differed from the more expansive early feminist arguments for equal political rights of people such as Olympe de Gouges. In 1783, Madame Roland's views on women's roles remained relatively conventional, although her ideas began to evolve in the following years. She believed like many other members of Girondin club in the existence of "natural" divisions between the sexes. However, she also developed her thinking along Rousseauian lines to emphasize the importance of women as the moral center of the home, thus influencing men and children, extending to the home and the moral center of the nation. Rousseau’s glorification of women’s private virtues as the foundation for a new social order influenced many, despite his emphasis on circumscribed domestic and public gender roles. She saw women’s sensitivity – their sensibility – to be their greatest form of influence and power. Thus, she felt that it was supremely important that women not only define the domestic but through it form a critical intellectual and moral influence upon men.

Madame Roland found in Rousseau’s model of femininity a path for attaining domestic happiness. Yet she also felt its constraints, stating that she was annoyed with being born a woman in her century, not least because she did not feel suited to the gender norms of the day, musing she would have fared better as a woman in the Roman or Spartan Empires.

== In power: the Ministry of the Interior ==
=== Revolution gathering speed ===
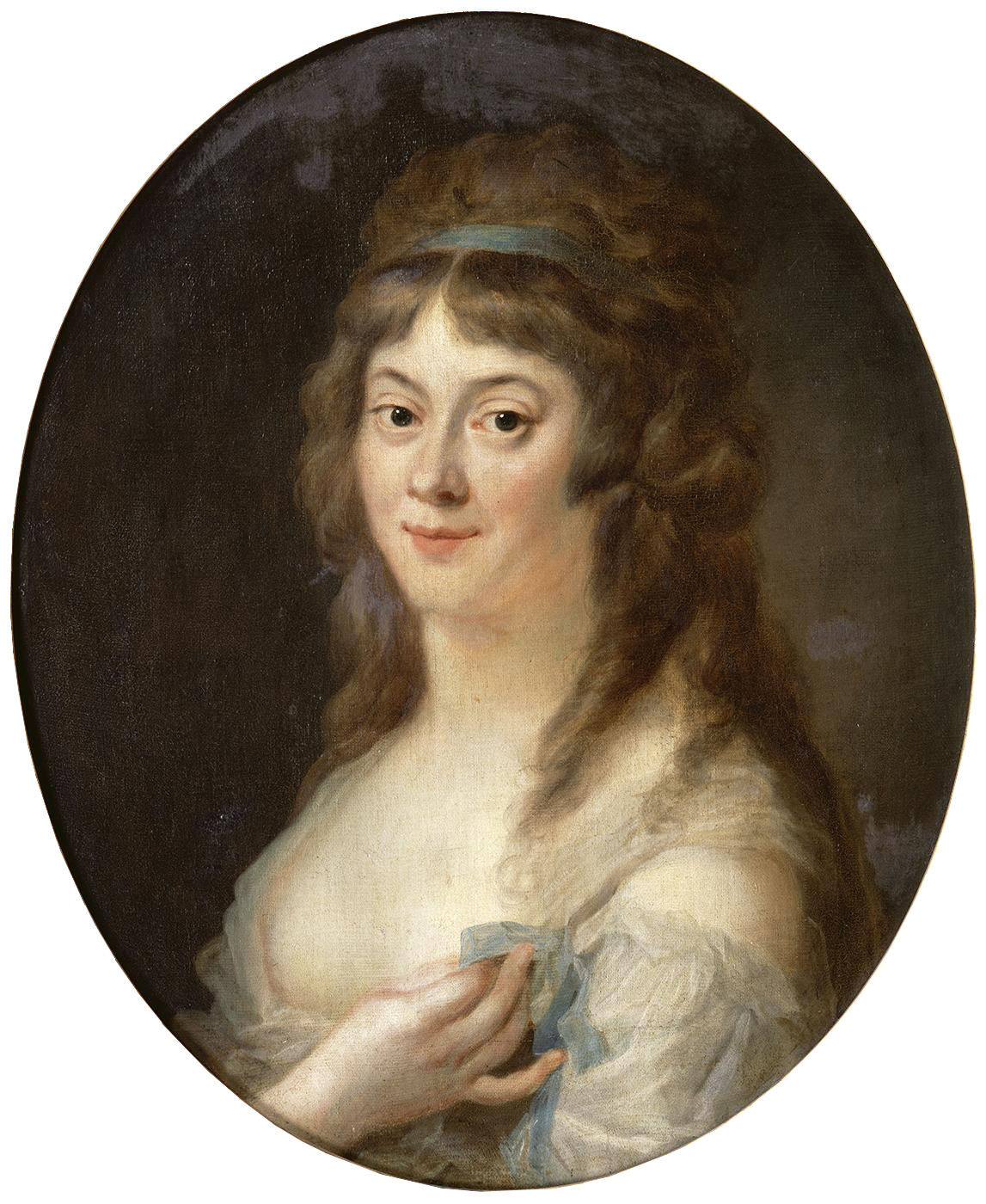
Madame Roland by Johann Julius Heinsius, 1792. The descendants of Madame Roland were convinced that this was not her portrait.

In the months immediately after her arrival in Paris, Madame Roland was not satisfied with the progress of social and political change in France, which she felt to be not fast and far-reaching enough. When King Louis XVI tried to flee the country with his family in June 1791, the revolution gained momentum. Madame Roland herself took to the streets to lobby for the introduction of a republic; she also became a member of a political club under her own name for the first time, despite her conviction that women should not have a role in public life. (Note: The society she joined would have been either the Societé fraternelle des deux sexes or the Societé fraternelle des amies de la vérité. (Reynolds, p 146)) She felt that at that point in time there was so much at stake that everyone — man or woman — had to fully exert themselves to bring about change. In July of that year, a demonstration on the Champs de Mars led to a massacre: the National Guard opened fire on demonstrators, killing possibly as many as 50 people. Many prominent revolutionaries feared for their lives and fled; the Rolands provided a temporary hiding place for Louise de Kéralio and her husband François Robert.

Soon divisions began to occur within the revolutionaries in the legislative assembly, particularly as to whether France should start a war against Prussia and Austria. Brissot and most of the Girondins were in favour (they feared military support for the monarchy from Prussia and Austria), while Robespierre first wanted to put internal affairs in order. The political situation was so divided that it was next to impossible to form a stable government: there were no ministerial candidates that were acceptable to all parties (including the king and the court). The Girodins were given the opportunity to put their ideas into practice: King Louis XVI asked them to appoint three ministers. In March 1792 Roland was appointed Minister of the Interior. This appointment came so unexpectedly that the Rolands at first thought Brissot was joking. There is no indication that they were actively seeking a government post for Roland. (Note: In 1790 - 1792, the Rolands were exploring the idea to set up a community of friends living according to the ideal of the Revolution in a rural area in France, or possibly in America. This plan, which involved Brissot, Bancal d'Issarts and Lanthenas, is frequently mentioned in their letters; they did not discuss a political appointment.) The couple moved into the Hôtel Pontchartran, the official residence of the minister, but kept on their small apartment in the city — just in case.

=== First term of office ===
The office of Minister of the Interior was difficult and the work load was extremely heavy. The ministry was responsible for elections, education, agriculture, industry, commerce, roads, public order, poor relief and the working of government. Madame Roland remained the driving force behind her husband's work. She commented on all documents, wrote letters and memorandums, and had a major say in appointments, for example that of Joseph Servan de Gerbey as minister of war. She was, as always, very firm in her views and convinced of her own infallibility.

In April 1792, the war so fervently desired by the Girondins broke out. Madame Roland wrote a reproachful letter to Robespierre because he still opposed the idea. This led to the end of the friendly relations between Robespierre and the Rolands; eventually he would become a sworn enemy of the Girondins and of Madame Roland.

Madame Roland was able to convince her husband and the other ministers that the king was plotting to restore the ancien régime. It was her idea to establish an army camp near Paris with 20,000 soldiers from all over France; these should intervene in the event of a possible counter-revolution in the capital. When Louis XVI hesitated to sign this into law, Roland sent him a disrespectful protest letter and published it before the king could respond. Madame Roland is rather vague in her memoirs as to whether she was merely involved in editing the letter, or whether she wrote the whole text. The latter is considered most likely by her biographers. In any case, it was her idea to publish the letter to get more support in the assembly and in the population.

On June 10, 1792, Louis XVI sacked Jean-Marie Roland and the two other Girondin ministers. After this, radical Jacobins and Montagnards took the political initiative, which eventually led to the end of the monarchy on 10 August. Roland was then reappointed as minister.

=== Second term of office ===
The king's fall heralded the start of the Terror, a period in which radical groups with great bloodshed got rid of their opponents. In radical circles the position of the Rolands was controversial. The Jacobins, the Montagnards and the Paris Commune viewed them with suspicion: that Roland had served as minister under Louis XVI was seen as collaborating with the ancien régime. His dismissal by the king had only led to a temporary restoration of their reputation.

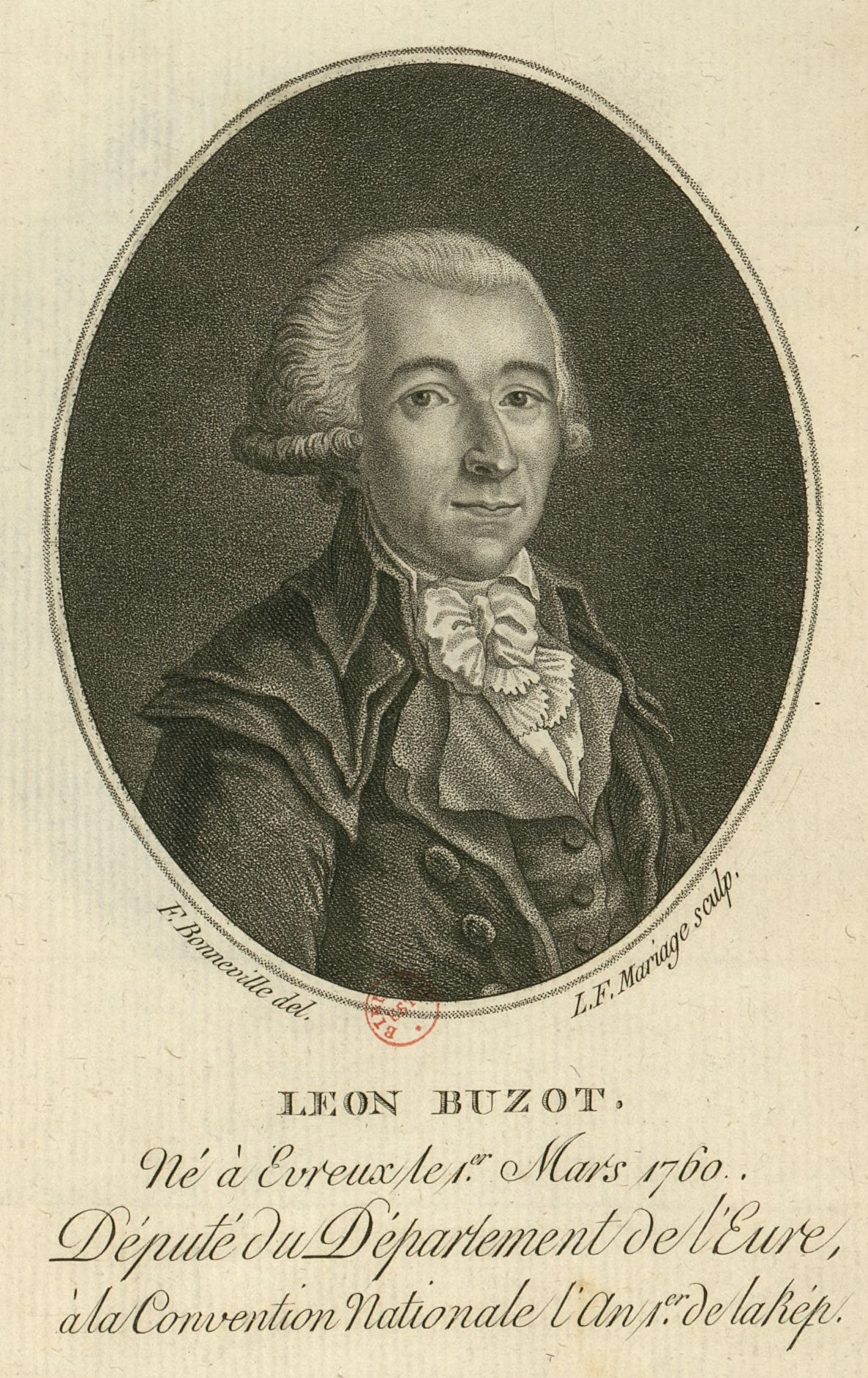
François Buzot, with whom Madame Roland had an intense platonic relationship in the last year of her life

For her part, Madame Roland had no sympathy for "hooligans" like the Jacobins and the Montagnards. Although in letters written during the early days of the revolution she had found the use of violence acceptable, she had a great aversion to brutal and uncivilized behavior. She also resented the uncouth Jacobin foreman Georges Danton, and did not respond to his overtures to cooperate with her. Some historians argue that her refusal to enter into an alliance with Danton ultimately contributed to the fall of the Girondins.

When on 6 and 7 September, hundreds of prisoners were massacred in Parisian prisons because they were suspected of anti-revolutionary sympathies, Madame Roland wrote to a friend that she was beginning to feel ashamed of the revolution. Determining who was responsible for this slaughter became another point of contention between the various factions. Madame Roland — and most of the other Girondins — pointed to Marat, Danton and Robespierre as the instigators of the violence. Political opponents of the Rolands pointed out that "their" Ministry of the Interior was responsible for the prisons and had taken very little action to prevent or stop the violence.

During Roland's second term of office, Madame Roland again occupied an important position. It was common knowledge that she wrote most of her husband's political texts and that he fully relied on her judgment and ideas; both Danton and Marat publicly mocked him for it. She had her own office in the ministry and directed the work of the Bureau d'esprit public (the "public opinion office"), which aimed to spread the revolutionary ideals among the population. Opponents of the Rolands accused them of using the Office to issue state propaganda in support of the Girondin cause. Although there is no evidence that the Rolands were appropriating public money, it is certain that they were involved in attempts to blacken their political opponents. At least one of the secret agents run by the ministry reported directly to Madame Roland.

The private life of Madame Roland was turbulent during this period. A passionate but in her own words platonic romance had developed between her and the Girondin deputy François Buzot, whom she had first met as a visitor to her salon. This affected her relationship with her husband, who found the idea that his wife was in love with another man hard to bear. The romance with Buzot was possibly also one of the factors contributing to the break with a political ally; her old friend Lanthenas, now a parliamentarian, had for years been in love with her himself, and now distanced himself from the circle around Madame Roland — and from the Girondins.

== Downfall ==
=== Fall of the Girondins ===
Radical newspapers and pamphlets began to spread more and more rumors about anti-revolutionary conspiracies that supposedly were forged at the Rolands' home. The rather sober dinners that Madame Roland gave twice a week (successors of the salon she hosted before Jean-Marie Roland became minister) were depicted as decadent events where politicians were seduced to join the "Roland clique". Jean-Paul Marat, Jacques-René Hébert and Camille Desmoulins depicted Madame Roland as a manipulative courtesan who deceived the virtuous Roland; in their articles and pamphlets they compared her to Madame du Barry and Marie Antoinette. Although Danton and Robespierre also attacked her in their writings, they presented her as a dangerous political opponent and not as a wicked female.

Madame Roland's political opponents

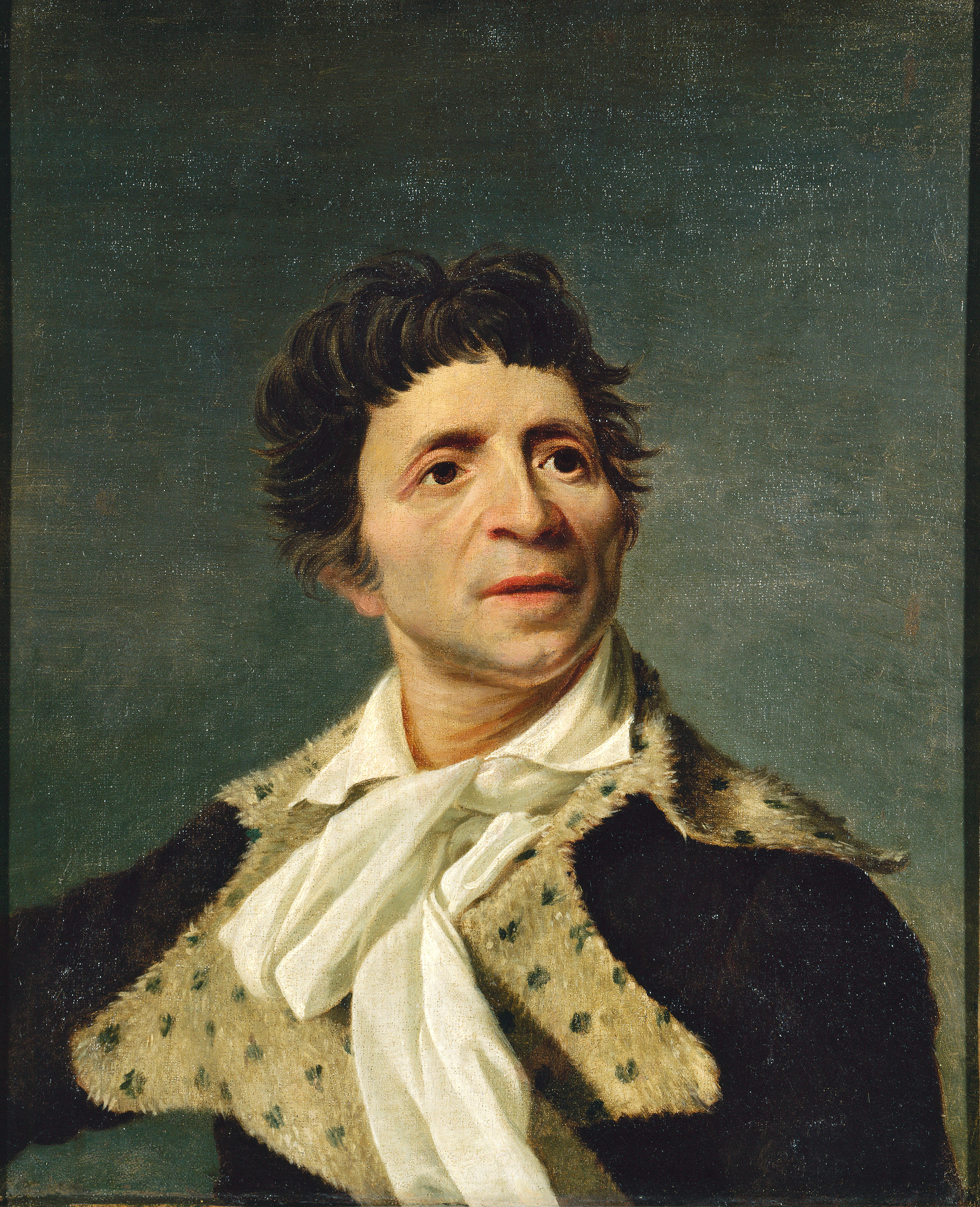
Marat

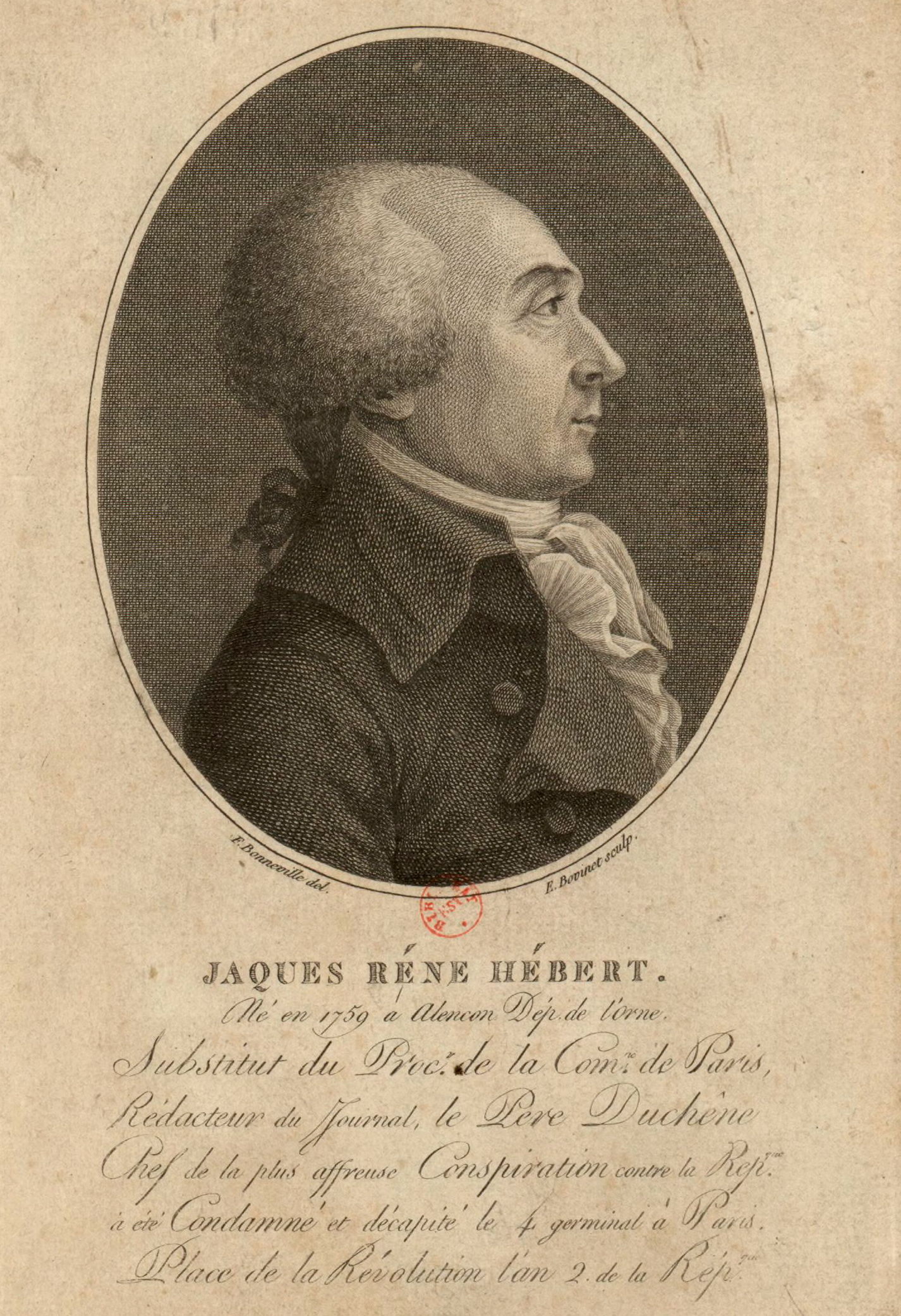
Hébert

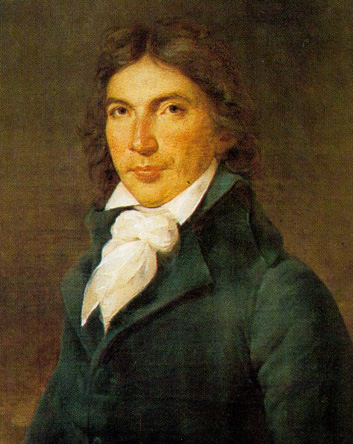
Desmoulins

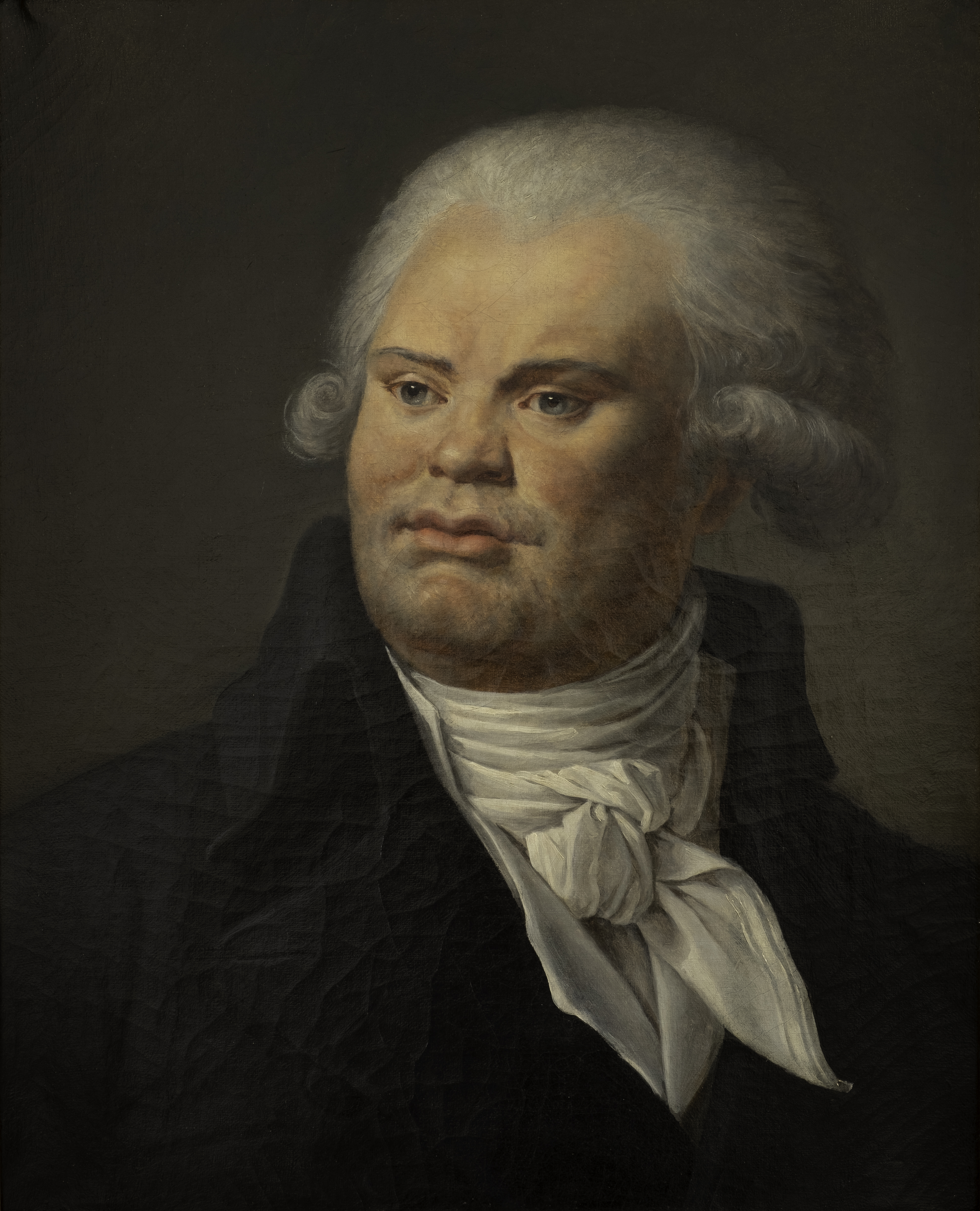
Danton

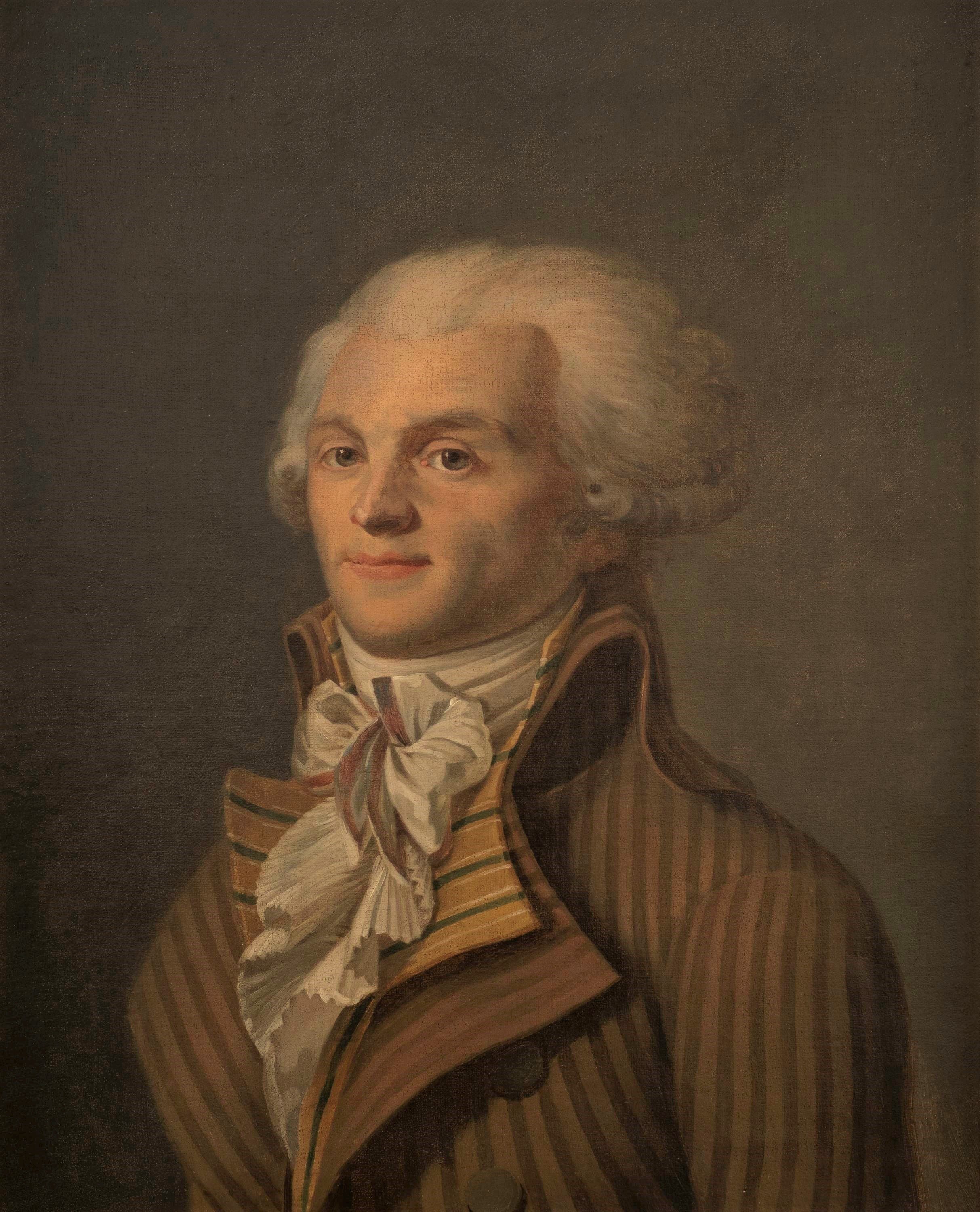
Robespierre

In December 1792, Madame Roland had to appear before the National Convention, the new legislative body, on charges of corresponding with aristocrats who had fled to England. She defended herself so well that the deputies applauded — the public gallery remained silent. Her reputation among the people of Paris was poor and there were fears of an assassination attempt; for her own safety she no longer went out into the streets. She slept with a loaded gun within reach; in case of an attack she wanted to be able to end her life, so as not to fall into the hands of the sans-culottes alive.

Political relations were strained further because of the trial of the king and disagreements about the punishment that should be imposed on him. Most Girondin deputies voted against the death penalty, or at least against an immediate execution of the king. Madame Roland's letters indicate that she too was against the death sentence. After the execution of Louis XVI on January 21, 1793, Jean-Marie Roland resigned as minister. The reasons are not entirely clear — possibly he resigned in protest against the execution, but possibly also because the work load, the ongoing personal and political attacks by the radicals, and the marital problems had become too much for him. Almost immediately, his papers were confiscated and an investigation was started into his actions as minister. The Rolands were also forbidden to leave Paris. (Note: Possibly this was a reprisal by his political opponents. A few months earlier, Roland had opened a strongbox with confidential documents of Louis XVI. He had handed this over to the Convention with the announcement that several delegates (none of them Girondins) appeared to have conspired with the king. He was accused of having destroyed papers that could have incriminated the Girondins.)

In April of that year, Robespierre openly accused the Girondins of betraying the Revolution. A few weeks later, on May 31, a "revolutionary committee" (possibly set up by the Paris Commune) made an attempt to arrest Roland. He managed to escape. After hiding with the Rolands' friend the naturalist Bosc d'Antic in a former priory in the forest of Montmorency, he fled to Amiens and from there to Rouen. Madame Roland refused to flee or go into hiding; she even went to the Convention to personally protest against the attempted arrest of her husband. In her memoirs she does not fully explain why she acted the way she did. Possibly she was convinced that there was no legal basis to arrest her, but in the early morning of June 1, 1793 she was arrested at her home and transferred to the prison in the abbey of Saint-Germain-des-Prés. The radical anti-feminist newspaper Le Père Duchesne falsely claimed she had confessed to counter-revolutionary activities. In her writings she describes the caricaturing of her female body typical of Père Duchesne style of writing: "I was not only transformed into a counter-revolutionary, but into a toothless old hag, and they finished by making me cry about my sins while expecting me to expiate them on the guillotine."

She was the first prominent Girondin to be incarcerated, and soon a wave of arrests followed. A number of Girondin politicians, including Buzot, managed to escape from Paris.

=== Imprisonment ===
In prison, Madame Roland was allowed to receive visitors. Her assistant Sophie Grandchamp came every other day; Bosc d'Antic brought her flowers from the botanical garden on his regular visits. They smuggled out her letters to Buzot and presumably also to her husband (any letters to Roland have been lost). She studied English and even had a piano in her cell for a while.

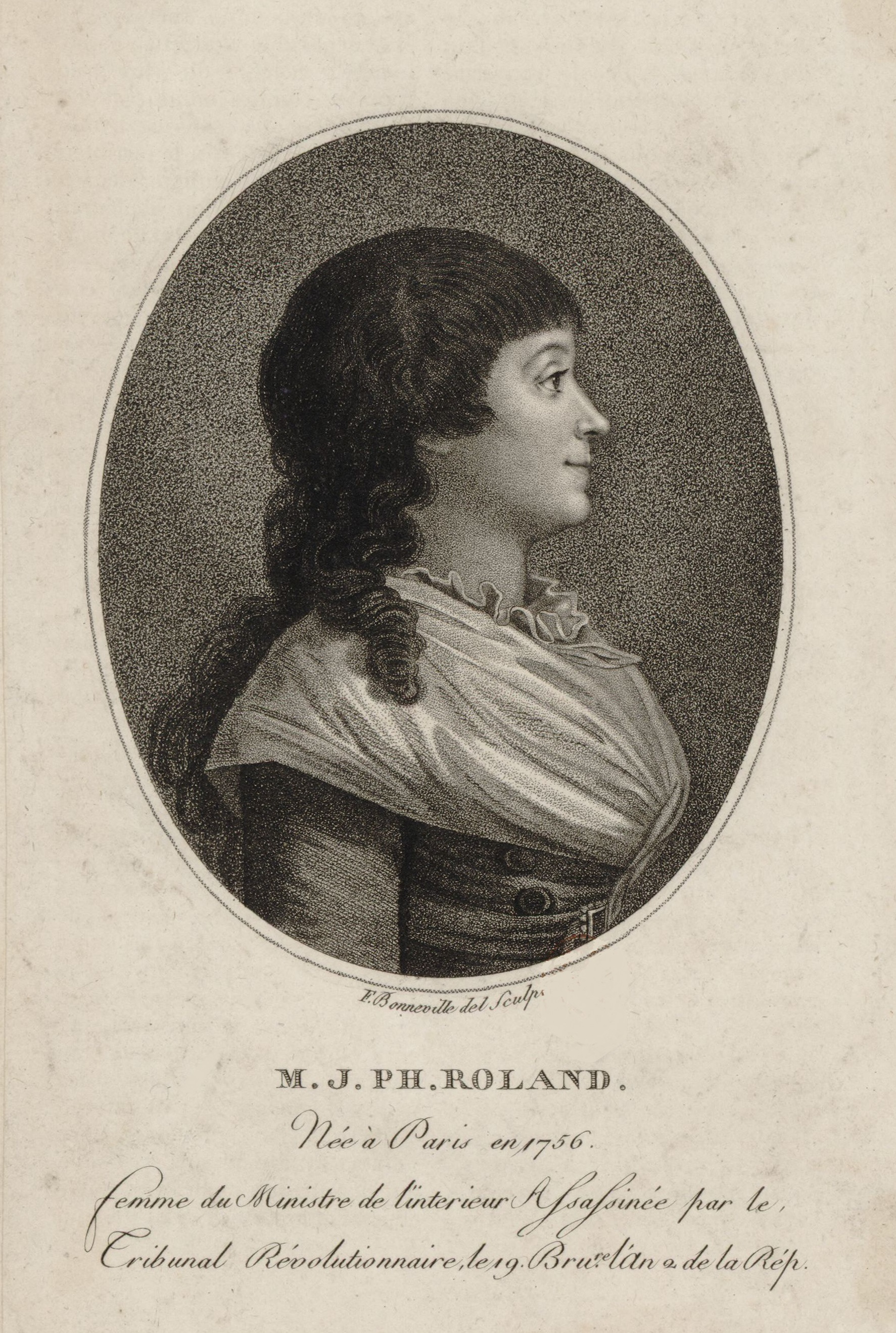
Madame Roland; drawing by François Bonneville

On June 24, she was unexpectedly released because the legal basis for her arrest had been flawed but was later rearrested on a new indictment the very moment she wanted to enter her home. She spent the rest of her imprisonment in the harsher prison of Sainte Pelagie. She was very concerned about the fate of Buzot, more than about Jean-Marie Roland. She was hurt and angry that in his memoirs her husband planned to hold Buzot responsible for the crisis in their marriage. With some difficulty she managed to convince him to destroy the manuscript. She was convinced that she would eventually be put to death but refused to cooperate with an escape plan organized by Roland which involved exchanging clothes with a visitor; she thought this too risky for the visitor.

Outside of Paris, in the summer of 1793 resistance grew against the events in the capital. A revolt broke out in Lyon, and there were centres of resistance in Brittany and Normandy. In the provinces some Girondins argued in favour of a federal republic or even secession from "Paris". Madame Roland implored her friends not to put themselves at risk but Buzot, who reportedly always carried a miniature of Madame Roland and a lock of her hair with him, was involved in attempts to organise a revolt in Caen. The fate of the imprisoned Girondins was sealed when Charlotte Corday, a Girondin sympathizer from Caen, assassinated the popular Marat in Paris.

When Madame Roland heard in October that Buzot too was in danger of being arrested, she tried to end her life by refusing food. Bosc d'Antic and Sophie Grandchamp were able to convince her that it would be better to stand trial, because that way she would be able to answer her accusers and save her reputation.

Madame Roland's imprisonment brought her into direct conflict with the revolutionary government she had previously supported. Her arrest reflected the growing political divisions between the Girodins and their opponents.

=== Trial and execution ===
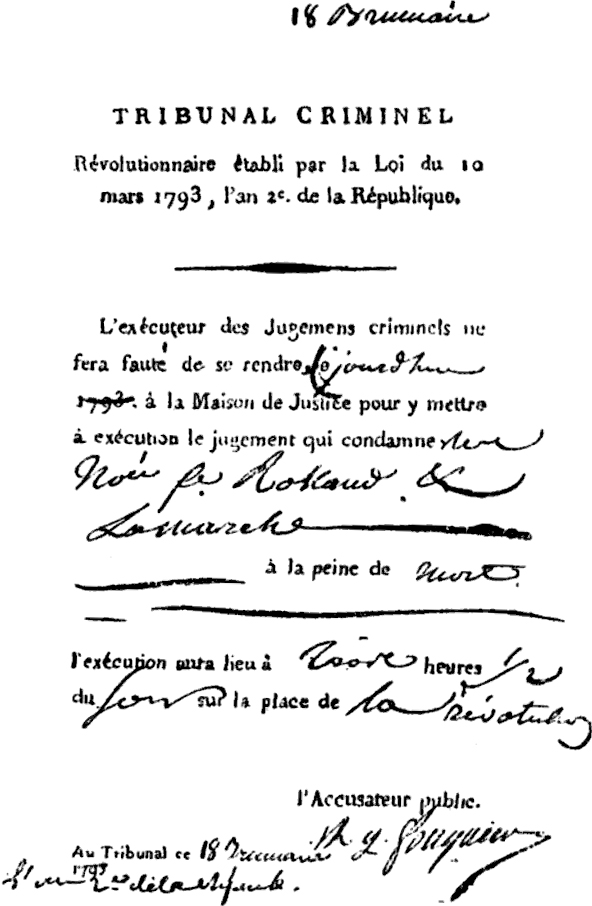
Madame Roland's death warrant, signed by Antoine Quentin Fouquier-Tinville

On October 31, 1793, twenty-one Girondin politicians were executed after a short trial; most of them were known to Madame Roland and the group included her good friend Brissot. (Note: It is not clear whether Madame Roland was called as a witness during the trial against the Girondins. She was present in the building where the trial took place. However, the judge ruled at a certain point that the case had been going on long enough "because the accused had already been found guilty by the people.") The next day she was transferred to the Conciergerie, the prison known as the last stop on the way to the guillotine; immediately upon arrival she was questioned by the prosecutor for two days. She defended herself in her customary self-assured, (according to the newspaper Le Moniteur Universel) even haughty manner against the accusations, but also argued in her defence that she was "only a wife" and therefore could not be held responsible for the political actions of her husband. According to eyewitnesses like her fellow prisoner and political adversary Jacques Claude Beugnot she remained calm and courageous during her stay in the Conciergerie. On 8 November she appeared before the Revolutionary Tribunal. She had no doubt that she would be sentenced to death and dressed that day in the toilette de mort she had selected some time before: a simple dress of white-yellow muslin with a black belt. After a short trial she was found guilty of conspiracy against the revolution and the death sentence was pronounced; the judge did not allow her to read a statement she had prepared.

The sentence was carried out the same day: November 8, 1793. Sophie Grandchamp and the historian Pierre François Tissot saw her pass on her way to the guillotine and reported that she appeared very calm. There are two versions handed down concerning her last words at the foot of the guillotine: 'O Liberté, que de crimes on commet en ton nom! ("Oh freedom, what crimes are committed in your name!"), or O Liberté, on t'a jouée ("Oh freedom, they have made a mockery of you."). Le Moniteur Universel wrote disapprovingly that Madame Roland had gone to her death with "ironic gaiety" and stated that like Marie Antoinette and the feminist Olympe de Gouges, she had been put to death because she had crossed the "boundaries of female virtue".

When two days later Jean-Marie Roland heard in his hiding place in Rouen that his wife had been executed, he committed suicide. Her beloved Buzot lived as a fugitive for several months and then also ended his own life. After the death of her parents, her daughter Eudora came under the guardianship of Bosc d'Antic and later married a son of the journalist Luc-Antoine de Champagneux.

== Legacy ==
=== Memoirs and letters ===
During the five months she was imprisoned, Madame Roland wrote her memoirs entitled Appel à l'impartiale postérité (Appeal to the impartial posterity). These consist of three parts:

- Mémoires historiques ("Historical Memoirs"), a defense of her political actions in the years 1791 – 1793
- Mémoires particuliers ("Personal Memoirs")', in which she describes her childhood and upbringing
- Mes dernières pensées ("My Last Thoughts")

, an epilogue she wrote when she decided in early October 1793 to end her life by a hunger strike.

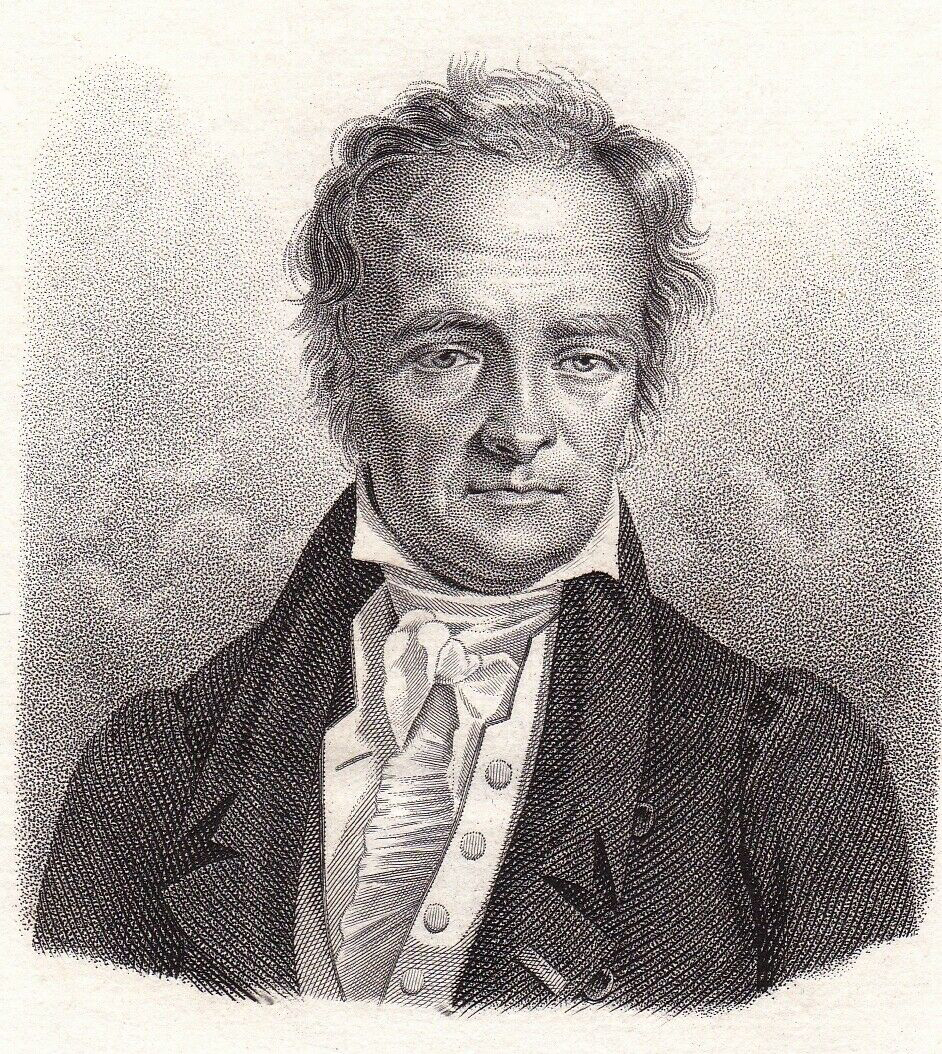
Louis-Augustin Bosc d'Antic was one of Madame Roland's best friends. He was responsible for the publication of the first edition of her memoirs.

In the Mémoires historiques, she goes into much effort to show that she had played her dutiful role as wife and had always behaved in a way that was considered appropriate for a woman of her time. She is indignant that the Jacobin press compared her to the influential noble women from the ancien régime. At the same time, through her description of events she shows — consciously or unconsciously — how large her influence was within the Girondin circle, and how fundamentally important her contribution was to Roland's ministry. She provides a fairly reliable and accurate account of events, although she sometimes leaves out things that do not show her in the most favorable light. She was certainly not neutral in her description of people she did not like.

In the Mémoires particuliers she reports on her personal life in a way that was unusual for a woman of that time. She speaks of a sexual assault by a pupil of her father, her experiences during her wedding night and her problems with breastfeeding. In this she followed Rousseau who also mentions 'inappropriate' personal details in his Confessions.

She entrusted the manuscript of her memoirs to the journalist Luc-Antoine de Champagneux, whom she knew from Lyon. When he also was in danger of being arrested, the document was burned to prevent it from falling into the wrong hands. In the final months of her imprisonment she wrote the memoirs all over again. This second manuscript was smuggled out of prison in small packages, was hidden by Bosc d'Antic during the Terror and is now in the Bibliothèque nationale de France in Paris.

Madame Roland wanted her words to be published after her death. She regretted that she would not live long enough to write the complete history of the French Revolution. In 1795, two years after her death, the memoirs appeared in print for the first time. At least 12,000 copies were sold. This first edition was edited by Bosc d'Antic; references to her love for Buzot and her deistic ideas were "cleansed" by him. In 1864, the sections of text removed by Bosc and five letters from Madame Roland to Buzot were rediscovered. Only then did it become generally known who Madame Roland had been in love with during the last months of her life. In 1905 the complete, uncensored text was published for the first time.

Many of her letters to friends, relatives and co-revolutionaries survived and have been published; these too are a rich source of information about historical events and people, and about daily life at the end of the 18th century. There are about a thousand letters dating from the period 1767 to 1793. Her main correspondents were her childhood friend Sophie Cannet, her husband, and Bosc d'Antic; in addition, she also corresponded frequently with Lanthenas and Bancal d'Issarts, Girondins whom she considered friends.

=== Historiography ===
In 1837, the Scottish historian Thomas Carlyle published The French Revolution: a History, his now famous study of the French Revolution. He paid ample attention to the role of Madame Roland, whom he called the bravest of French women. Alphonse de Lamartine also praised her in his Histoire des Girondins (1847).

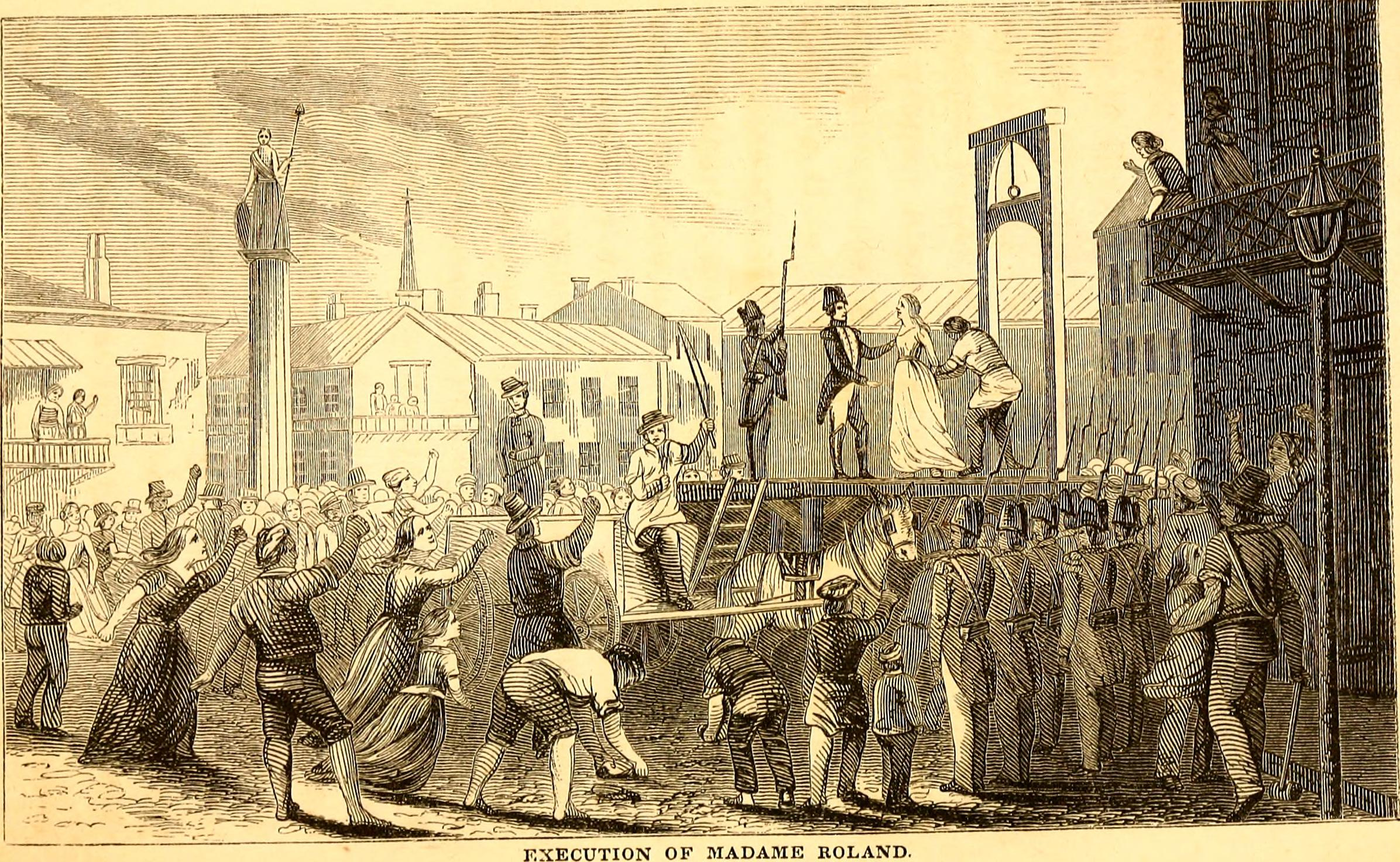
Illustration from The History of Madame Roland, a biography from 1850

In the second half of the nineteenth century the first biographies of Madame Roland were published. These followed the admiring example of Carlyle and Lamartine and were based on the censored versions of her memoirs. Until the 20th century, biographers emphasized her intelligence, feminine charm and high morals, and depicted her primarily as a tragic heroine in the struggle for freedom and equality. The American writer Jeanette Eaton wrote a prize-winning biography about Madame Roland for children, titled A daughter of the Seine (1929).

=== Women's studies ===
Madame Roland's memoirs and letters are unique in that they show the French Revolution from the perspective of a very intelligent woman who played an active role in the heart of events. When interest in the role of women in history grew at the end of the twentieth century, there was an upsurge in the number of publications on the life and work of Madame Roland. This helped build a more nuanced and less idealized image of her. There has also been a minor rehabilitation of Jean-Marie Roland, who was traditionally presented as someone intellectually and politically dwarfed by his wife. It is now recognized that although he did not have his wife's charisma and sharp political talent, he was an intelligent and conscientious administrator.

In particular, attention focused on the contrast between Madame Roland's views on the limited role women should play in public life, expressed doubt about female authorship and her own active and directive involvement in politics. Madame Roland never spoke out for women's rights. She stated that the time was not yet right for women to openly participate in public debate but rather the role of women was to inspire and support the men behind the scenes. Only when all French men were politically and socially free, could women also claim their place in public life. It is possible that here too she followed her idol Rousseau, who felt that women should be mainly supportive and subservient.

At the same time she states in her memoirs that the restrictions imposed by society on women were abhorrent to her, and looking back she found it difficult to stomach that for a time she had played only a subordinate role in the collaboration with her husband. However, she chose to conform to the social norms of her time. Her views are closer to those held by Louise de Kéralio than the revolutionary feminists Etta Palm and Olympe de Gouges.

=== In art ===
The life of Madame Roland inspired writers, film makers and composers:

- Camille de Sainte-Croix and Émile Bergerat (1899). Manon Roland. Play.
- Felix Fourdrain (1913). Madame Roland: Drame Lyrique En Trois Actes Et Cinq Tableaux. Opera
- Enrico Guazzoni (director) (1912). Madame Roland. Film. Madame Roland was played by Gianna Terribili-Gonzales.
- Edouard Molinaro (director) (1989). Manon Roland. Film. Sabine Haudepin played Madame Roland.
- Hilary Mantel. (1992) A place of greater safety . Madame Roland is one of the characters in this novel.
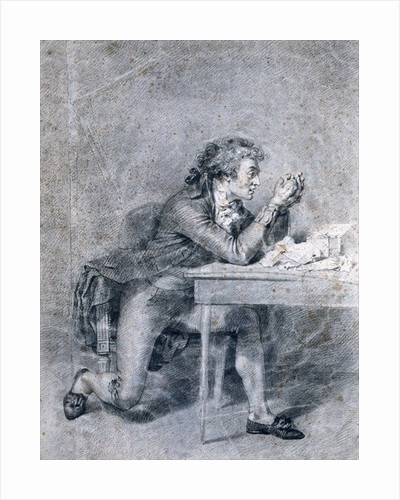
Buzot contemplating a miniature portrait of Madame Roland, by Etienne Charles Leguay

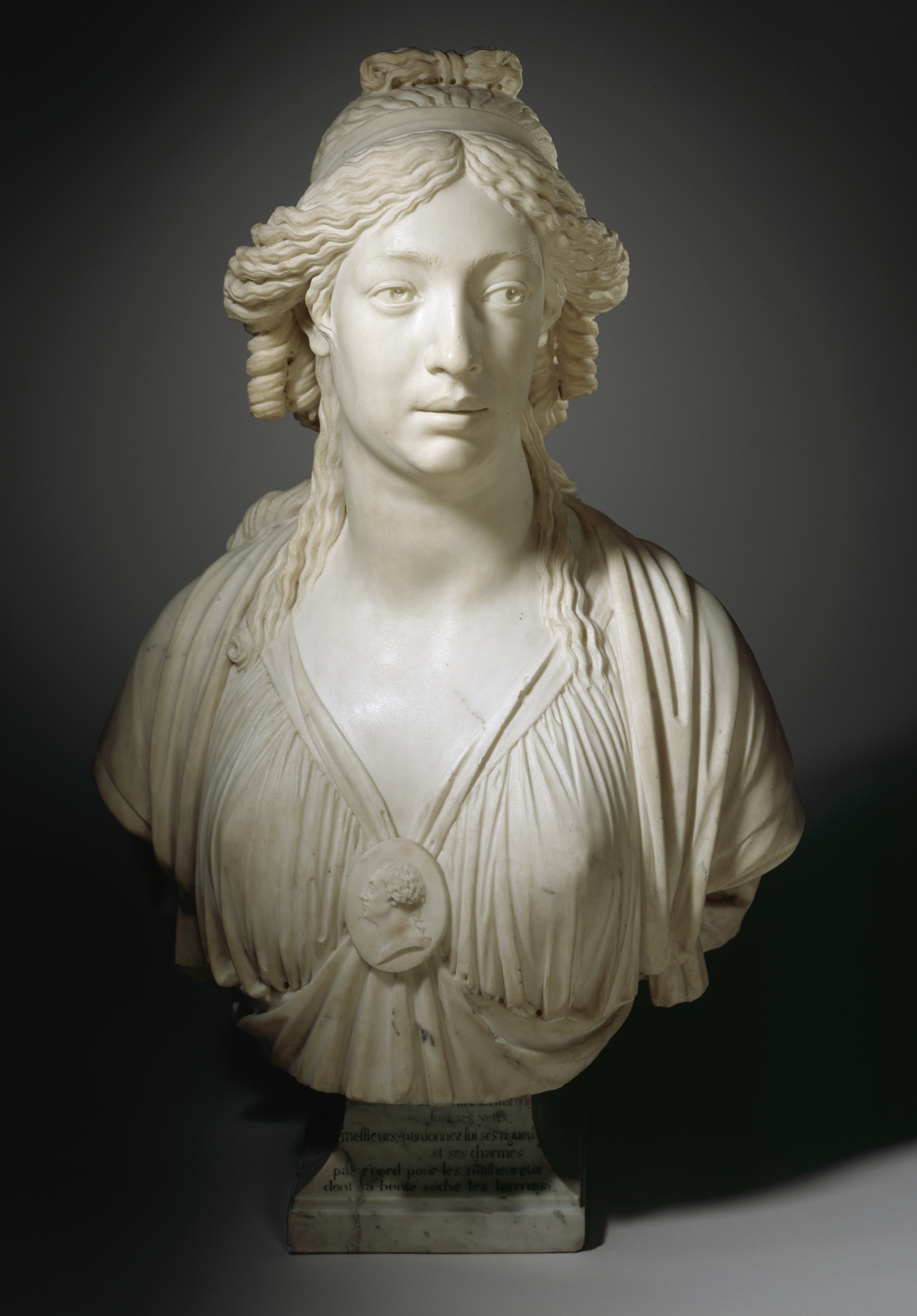
Bust of Madame Roland by François Masson (1745–1807)

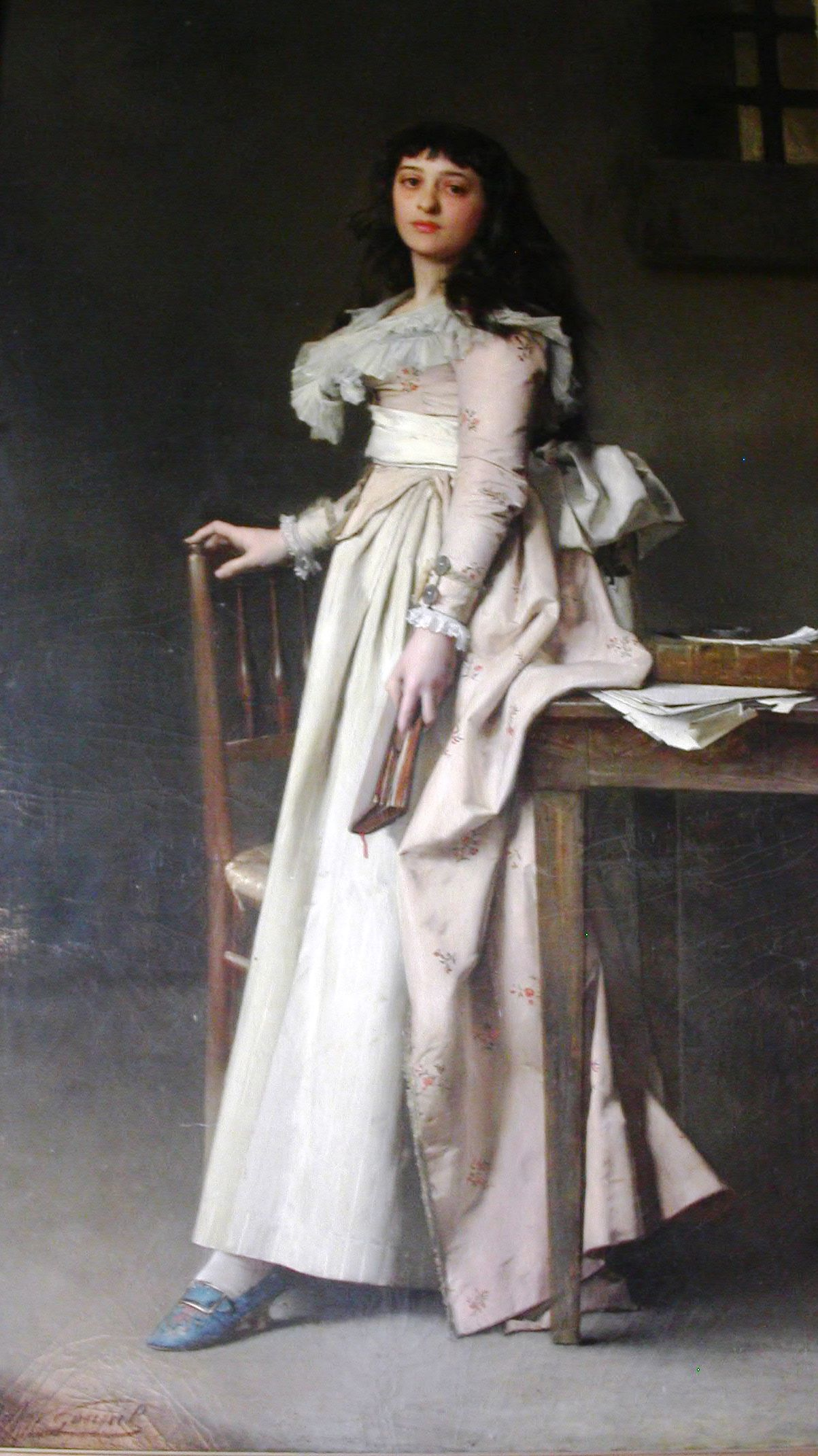
Jules-Adolphe Goupil (1839–1883) Madame Roland's final day. 1880

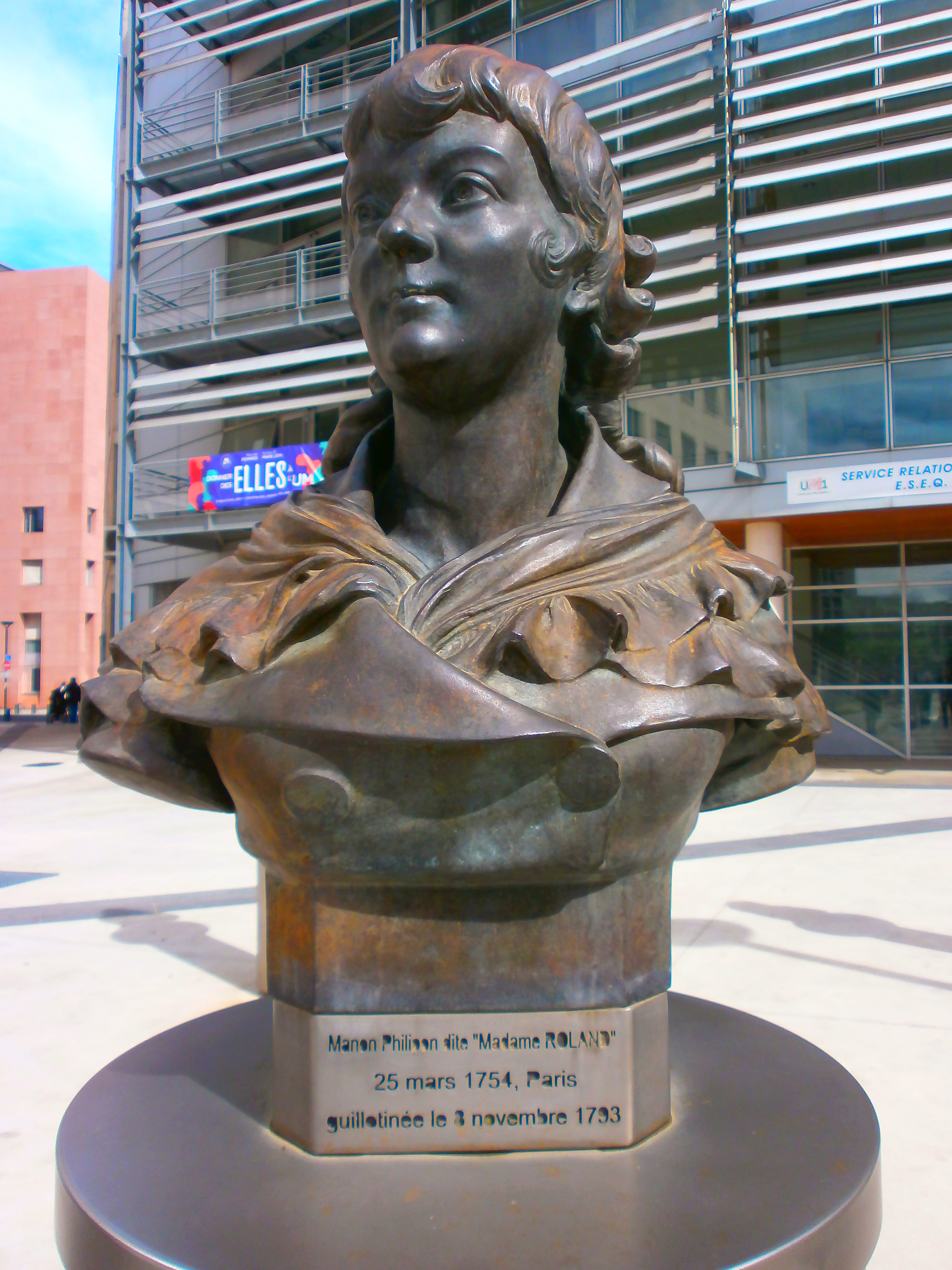
Bust of Madame Roland in Montpellier, by Joseph Carlier (1849–1927)

== Publications ==
- Lettres de Madame Roland: 1780–1793. (1900–1902). Part 1.Part 2
- Lettres de Madame Roland: 1767–1780. (1913–1915). Part 1.Part 2
- Mémoires de madame Roland. (1905). Part 1; Part 2 (Complete text)
- The private memoirs of Madame Roland. 1901. (English translation of edited text)

== Sources ==
Works cited

- McPhee, Peter (2017). Liberty or Death. The French Revolution. New Haven, CT: Yale University Press. ISBN 978-0-300-22869-4.
- Reynolds, Sian (2012). Marriage & Revolution. Monsieur and Madame Roland. Oxford, England: Oxford University Press. ISBN 978-0-19-956042-4.
- Schama, Simon (1989). Citizens: A Chronicle of the French Revolution. London, England: Penguin. ISBN 978-0-141-90604-1.
- Tarbell, Ida M. (1896). Madame Roland: A Biographical Study. New York, NY: C. Scribner's sons.
