= The Woman Dressed as a Man =

1932 film directed by Augusto Genina

- Directed by: Augusto Genina
- Written by: Ugo Falena (play)
- Produced by: Alexandre Kamenka
- Starring: Carmen Boni; Armand Bernard; André Dubosc
- Cinematography: Georges Périnal
- Music by: Armand Bernard; Jean Delanney
- Production company: Films Sonores Tobis
- Distributed by: Les Grandes Exclusivités Européennes
- Release date: 11 March 1932
- Country: France
- Language: French

The Woman Dressed as a Man (French: La femme en homme) is a 1932 French comedy film directed by Augusto Genina and starring Carmen Boni, Armand Bernard and André Dubosc.

It was based on a 1925 play by Ugo Falena which had previously been adapted into the 1926 silent film The Last Lord and was remade in 1945 as The Twentieth Duke.

The film's sets were designed by the art director Lazare Meerson.

== Cast ==
- Carmen Boni as Claude
- Armand Bernard as M. Gray
- André Dubosc as Le duc de Bressy
- Françoise Rosay as Princesse Marie
- Alex Bernard
- Pedro Elviro
- Bernard Koowost
- Victor Vina

== Bibliography ==
- Andrews, Dudley. Mists of Regret: Culture and Sensibility in Classic French Film. Princeton University Press, 1995.
