= Roberto Villa =

Italian actor (1915–2002)

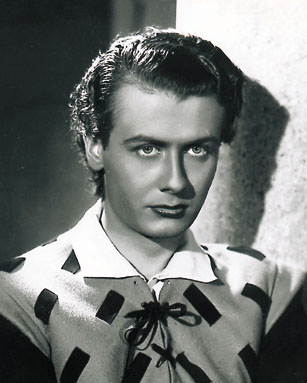
- Villa in The Fornaretto of Venice (1939)
- Born: Giulio Sabetta; 2 December 1915; Casablanca, French Morocco
- Died: 30 June 2002 (aged 86); Sutri, Italy
- Occupations: Actor; voice actor
- Years active: 1936–1993
- Spouse: Adriana Parrella (m. 1952)

Roberto Villa (born Giulio Sabetta; 2 December 1915 – 30 June 2002) was an Italian actor and voice actor.

== Biography ==
Born to Italian parents in Casablanca, where they were living because his father was the Italian consul. Villa completed his studies at the Centro Sperimentale di Cinematografia in Rome and he eventually made his way up to acting. He made his film debut in the 1936 film The Great Appeal directed by Mario Camerini. Villa acted in two other films throughout the course of the late 1930s which includes Luciano Serra, Pilot directed by Goffredo Alessandrini and The Fornaretto of Venice directed by Duilio Coletti.

Villa‘s likeness on the big screen was once compared to that of international actors such as Robert Montgomery and Robert Young. By the 1940s, Villa intensified his acting career and worked frequently with directors like Luigi Zampa, Carlo Ludovico Bragaglia, Sergio Tofano and more. Villa worked on stage frequently during the 1950s and moved on to television in the 1960s. He also worked as a voice dubbing artist, dubbing foreign films for release in Italy, most notably Robert Shaw’s voice. Villa’s voice was dubbed in some of his films by Carlo Romano and Mario Pisu. He then retired from cinema and television altogether with his wife during the 1970s.

=== Personal life ===
Villa was married to actress and director Adriana Parrella (who he met during a radio session in 1949) from 1952 until his death in 2002.

Villa had a passion for collecting seashells during his spare time.

== Death ==
Villa died in his home in Sutri following complications from pancreatitis on 30 June 2002. He was 86 years old.

== Filmography ==
=== Cinema ===
- The Great Appeal (1936)
- Luciano Serra, Pilot (1938)
- The Fornaretto of Venice (1939)
- Se quell'idiota ci pensasse (1939)
- La fanciulla di Portici (1940)
- Maddalena, Zero for Conduct (1940)
- Ecco la radio! (1940)
- La gerla di papà Martin (1941)
- Il sogno di tutti (1941)
- Marco Visconti (1941)
- I mariti (1941)
- L'elisir d'amore (1941)
- La sonnambula (1941)
- Princess Cinderella (1941)
- Once a Week (1942)
- Violets in Their Hair (1942)
- The Two Orphans (1942)
- Divieto di sosta (1942)
- Wedding Day (1942)
- Signorinette (1942)
- La fortuna viene dal cielo (1942)
- Il paese senza pace (1943)
- Lively Teresa (1943)
- La signora in nero (1943)
- Principessina (1943)
- La moglie in castigo (1943)
- Il processo alle zitelle (1944)
- Scadenza trenta giorni (1944)
- The Twentieth Duke (1945)
- Porte chiuse (1945)
- La prigioniera dell'isola (1946)
- Hotel Luna, Room 34 (1946)
- Un mese d'onestà (1947)
- La sirena del golfo (1948)
- The Dance of Death (1948)
- My Daughter Joy (1950)
- Il medico delle donne (1962)

=== Television ===
- L'amico del giaguaro (1961-1964)
- Le avventure di Laura Storm (1966)

== Dubbing roles ==
=== Live action ===
- Sheriff of Nottingham in Robin and Marian
- Romer Treece in The Deep
- Keith Mallory in Force 10 from Navarone
- General Marenkov in Avalanche Express
- Bernie Ohls in The Big Sleep (1946 redub)
- Skull in Blackie the Pirate
- Palpatine / Darth Sidious in Star Wars: Episode V – The Empire Strikes Back (original edition)
- Ira Wells in The Late Show
- Harry Coombes in Harry and Tonto
- Tom in Tell Them Willie Boy Is Here
- Auction director in Untamable Angelique
- Turkish Ambassador in Angelique and the Sultan
- Harry Greener in The Day of the Locust
- George Sims in Bedlam
- Professor Ruzinsky in The Sentinel
- Isoroku Yamamoto in Tora! Tora! Tora!
- M in Octopussy
- Tronk in The Desert of the Tartars
- Shack in Emperor of the North Pole
- Sam Hastings in Power
- Carlino in Wait Until Dark
- Jeff Newby in The Undefeated
- Dawes in The Man Who Loved Cat Dancing
- Del Gue in Jeremiah Johnson
- Melk Tavares in Gabriela
- Ronald Bart in Hanover Street
- Colonel Santilla in The Wrath of God
- Dale Coba in The Stepford Wives
