= Principessina =

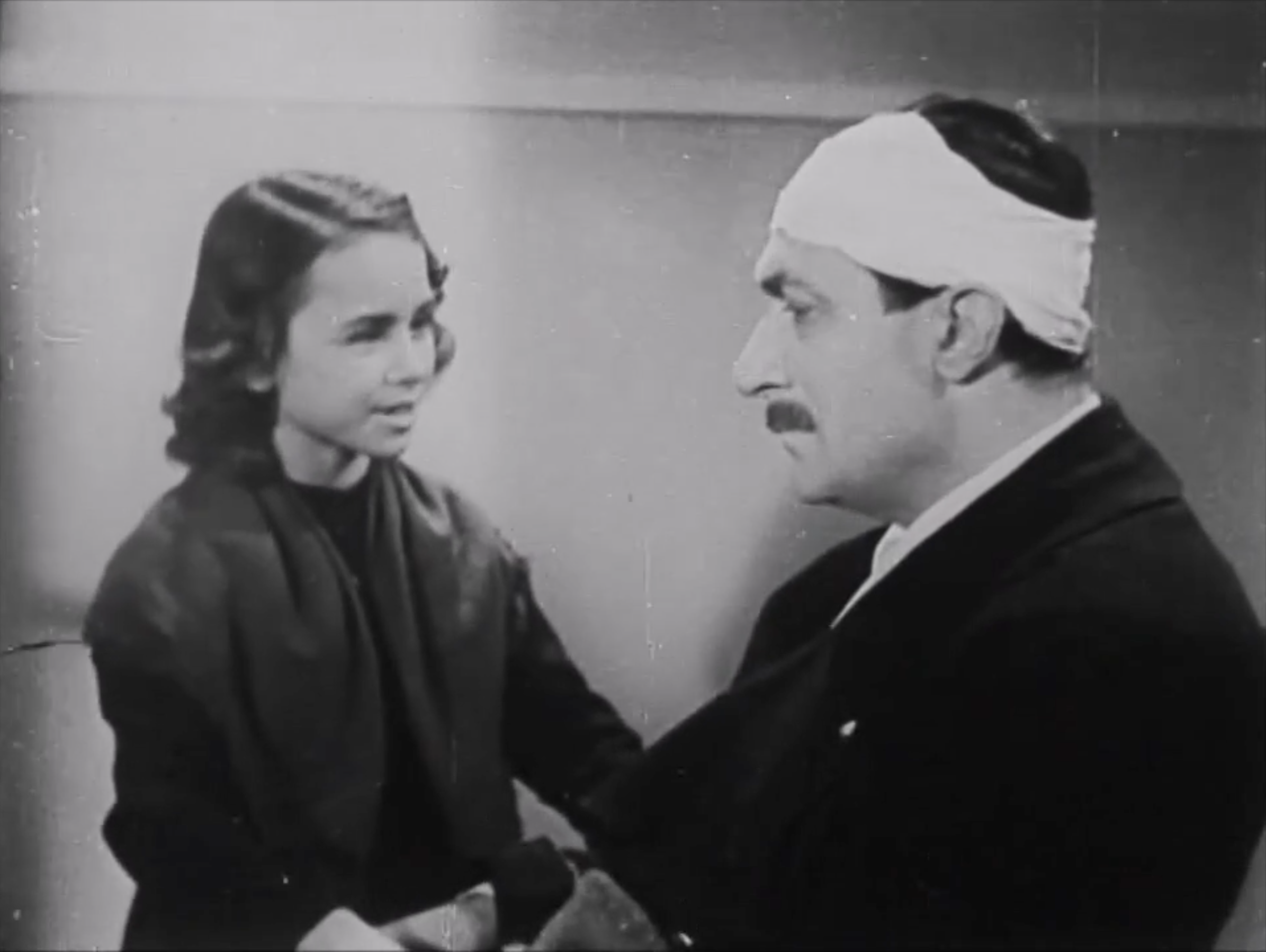
- Dal and Bernardi in a film scene
- Directed by: Tullo Gramantieri
- Screenplay by: Giovanni Del Lungo; Tullo Gramantieri
- Based on: A Little Princess by Frances Hodgson Burnett
- Produced by: Guy Simon
- Starring: Rosanna Dal; Nerio Bernardi; Roberto Villa
- Cinematography: Leonida Barboni
- Edited by: Eraldo Da Roma
- Music by: Gino Filippini
- Production company: Film Bassoli
- Distributed by: Cine Tirrenia
- Release date: 12 March 1943
- Running time: 78 minutes
- Country: Italy
- Language: Italian

Principessina ("Little Princess") is a 1943 Italian drama film directed by Tullio Gramantieri. It is an unauthorized remake of the 1939 film The Little Princess, which was in turn based on the novel A Little Princess by Frances Hodgson Burnett.

== Plot ==
The Prince of Torrefranca has to leave her young daughter Anna at a boarding school while he fights in the First Italo-Ethiopian War. He also entrusts a huge amount of money to the Headmistress, so that his daughter will have everything she needs. The child is treated well until her father is reported missing in action. Anna is now forced to sleep in the attic and is treated like a scullery maid by the cruel Headmistress, who has taken all of her money, but the child doesn't loose the hope to find her father, and after many researches and adventures she finally finds him injured in an hospital with the help of a royal princess. At the sight of her darling daughter, the prince recovers.

== Cast ==
- Rosanna Dal as Anna di Torrefranca
- Roberto Villa as Stefano, the riding instructor
- Nerio Bernardi as Principe di Torrefranca, Anna's father
- Vittorina Benvenuti as the Headmistress
- Mario Siletti as Germano, brother of the Headmistress
- Edvige Elisabeth as Clara, the teacher
- Rosetta D'Este as Mariannina
- Oreste Fares as Battista
- Tina Lattanzi as the Princess
- Olinto Cristina as the Baron
- Odette Bedogni as the Boarding school mate
- Celio Bucchi as an Officer
- Ruggero Capodaglio
- Alessandra Adari
- Anna Carena

== Production ==
Principessina was shot at the Tirrenia Studios. The working title was Bende lorde di sangue ("Bloodstained Bandages"). It was the debut of Delia Scala, here credited with her real name Odette Bedogni.

== Reception ==
The film was not a critical success.
