= Paola Veneroni =

Italian stage and film actress (1922–2021)

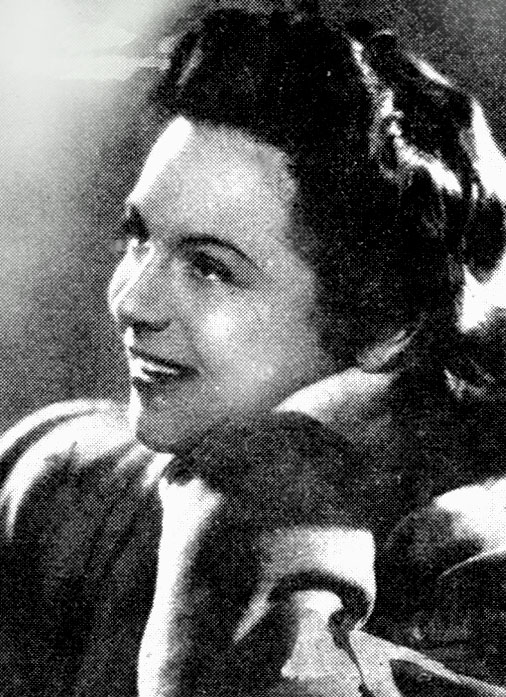
- 1948
- Born: 15 January 1922; Milan, Lombardy, Italy
- Died: 15 January 2021 (aged 99); Rome, Italy
- Occupation: Actress
- Years active: 1940–1949 (film and TV)

Paola Veneroni (15 January 1922 – 15 January 2021) was an Italian film and stage actress. She rose to prominence in the 1940s, starring in films such as the comedy The Twentieth Duke (1945) before switching to working in theatre. She was also a voice actress, employed for dubbing foreign films for release in Italy.

Veneroni retired from acting after her marriage. She died on 15 January 2021, her 99th birthday.

== Selected filmography ==
- Maddalena, Zero for Conduct (1940)
- Signorinette (1942)
- His Young Wife (1945)
- The Innocent Casimiro (1945)
- The Twentieth Duke (1945)
- Paese senza pace (1946)
- The Brothers Karamazov (1947)
- Yvonne of the Night (1949)

== Bibliography ==
- Goble, Alan. The Complete Index to Literary Sources in Film. Walter de Gruyter, 1999.
