= Signorinette =

1942 film

- Theatrical release poster
- Directed by: Luigi Zampa
- Written by: Gherardo Gherardi; Luciana Peverelli; Luigi Zampa
- Based on: Signorinette by Wanda Bontà
- Produced by: Angelo Besozzi
- Starring: Carla Del Poggio; Paola Veneroni; Claudio Gora; Roberto Villa
- Cinematography: Domenico Scala
- Edited by: Maria Rosada
- Music by: Salvatore Allegra
- Production companies: Artisti Tecnici Associati; Imperial Film
- Distributed by: Industrie Cinematografiche Italiane
- Release date: 19 December 1942
- Running time: 86 minutes
- Country: Italy
- Language: Italian

Signorinette (English: Little Ladies) is a 1942 Italian drama film directed by Luigi Zampa and starring Carla Del Poggio, Paola Veneroni and Roberto Villa. It was shot at the Cinecittà Studios in Rome. The film's sets were designed by the art director Giorgio Pinzauti.

== Synopsis ==
In Rome three teenage girls with very different backgrounds and personalities experience the difficulties of life.

== Cast ==
- Carla Del Poggio as Renata
- Paola Veneroni as Iris
- Anna Mari as Gisella
- Nella Paoli as Paola
- Claudio Gora as Marco Lancia, the writer
- Roberto Villa as Giorgio
- Giovanna Galletti as The gymnastics teacher
- Checco Durante as Iris' father
- Jone Morino as Iris' mother
- Bella Starace Sainati as Iris' grandmother

== Bibliography ==
- Reich, Jacqueline Beth. Fascism, Film, and Female Subjectivity: The Case of Italian Cinema 1936-1943. University of California, Berkeley, 1994.
