= The Great Appeal =

- Directed by: Mario Camerini
- Written by: Ercole Patti; Pietro Solari; Mario Soldati; Mario Camerini
- Produced by: Roberto Dandi
- Starring: Camillo Pilotto; Roberto Villa; Lina d'Acosta; Guglielmo Sinaz
- Cinematography: Massimo Terzano
- Edited by: Fernando Tropea
- Music by: Annibale Bizzelli
- Production company: Artisti Associati
- Distributed by: Artisti Associati
- Release date: November 1936
- Running time: 80 minutes
- Country: Italy
- Language: Italian

The Great Appeal (Italian: Il Grande appello) is a 1936 Italian war film directed by Mario Camerini and starring Camillo Pilotto, Roberto Villa and Lina d'Acosta. It is sometimes known by the alternative title The Last Roll-Call.

Camerini was considered to have no sympathies with the Fascist regime regime of Italy, but he made this propaganda film that endorsed the colonial policies of the Italian government. It was one of a number of African-set films made during the Fascist era including The White Squadron (1936), Sentinels of Bronze (1937) and Luciano Serra, Pilot (1938). The film portrays the rediscovery of his patriotism of an Italian, who eventually dies for his country.

== Synopsis ==
Giovanni Bertani is a rootless Italian emigrant who is currently running a hotel in French Djibouti. Although his son Enrico is serving with the Italian forces in the Second Italo-Ethiopian War he sells arms to the Abyssinian forces fighting them. Following a journey to Abyssinia Giovanni regains his sense of Italian identity, and is fatally wounded blowing up the shipment of arms to the Abyssinians.

== Cast ==
- Camillo Pilotto as Giovanni Bertani
- Roberto Villa (dubbed by Mario Pisu) as Enrico
- Lina d'Acosta as Pepita
- Guglielmo Sinaz as Miller - il contrabbandiere d'armi
- Bruno Smith as Il giornalista Patti
- Pedro Valdes as Salvador
- Nino Marchetti as Il chirurgo
- Enrico Poggi as Un operaio genovese

== Bibliography ==
- Ben-Ghiat, Ruth. Fascist Modernities: Italy, 1922-1945. University of California Press, 2004.
- Gundle, Stephen. Mussolini's Dream Factory: Film Stardom in Fascist Italy. Berghahn Books, 2013.
- Palumbo, Patrizia. A Place in the Sun: Africa in Italian Colonial Culture from Post-unification to the Present. University of California Press, 2003.
