= Luciano Serra, Pilot =

1938 Italian war film by Goffredo Alessandrini

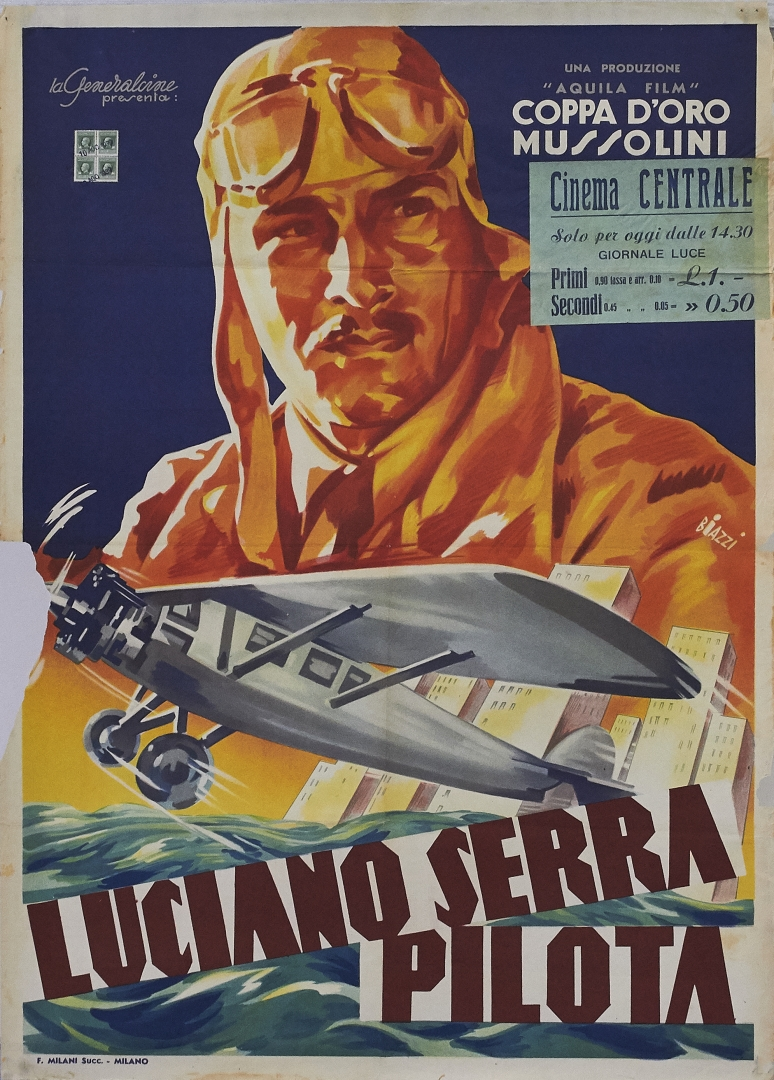
- Italian: Luciano Serra pilota
- Directed by: Goffredo Alessandrini
- Written by: Goffredo Alessandrini; Francesco Masoero
- Screenplay by: Goffredo Alessandrini; Roberto Rossellini; Fulvio Palmieri
- Produced by: Angelo Monti
- Starring: Amedeo Nazzari; Germana Paolieri; Roberto Villa; Mario Ferrari
- Cinematography: Ubaldo Arata
- Edited by: Giorgio Simonelli
- Music by: Giulio Cesare Sonzogno
- Production company: Aquila Cinematografica
- Distributed by: Generalcine
- Release date: 8 August 1938
- Running time: 102 minutes
- Country: Italy
- Language: Italian

Luciano Serra, Pilot (Italian: Luciano Serra pilota) is a 1938 Italian war drama film directed by Goffredo Alessandrini and starring Amedeo Nazzari, Germana Paolieri and Roberto Villa. It was screened at the Venice Film Festival in August 1938, where it was awarded the Mussolini Cup for Best Italian Film. The film's assistant director Roberto Rossellini supervised the shooting of footage on location in North Africa. Rossellini made his own directorial debut three years later with The White Ship, and went on to become a leading Italian filmmaker.

== Plot ==
Luciano Serra is a former pilot who, despite having been discharged at the end of World War I, retains a passion for flying. Using a small plane that he has salvaged, he begins offering flights to tourists over Lake Maggiore for 50 lire. However, business is poor; there are too few flights, and he hasn't paid his rent for six months. When the electricity is cut off for non-payment, his wife Sandra tries to convince him to accept a labourer's job that her father might offer him. He refuses, and Sandra leaves him, taking their young son to live with her father. Luciano leaves for South America to take up a job offered to him by a man he has met in a bar of a Grand Hotel in Stresa.

Ten years later, Luciano is still living in South America, working as a commercial pilot for a circus. When he gets the chance to fly to Rome, he feels that the time has come for his redemption. News of the flight quickly spreads far and wide and soon reaches Italy. There, Luciano's grown-up son Aldo, who has inherited his father's love of flying, wants to attend the Regia Aeronautica Academy. However, he needs his father's permission, which he receives on the day news spreads of Luciano's disappearance at sea after crashing during his attempted non-stop transatlantic flight to Italy.

Years pass, and war breaks out in Ethiopia. Aldo, now a skilled pilot, participates in the African campaign. One day, his squadron, commanded by Colonel Morelli, is tasked with inspecting a section of railway. Meanwhile, Luciano, who had narrowly avoided drowning, has enlisted in the Royal Italian Army under a false name. The two men are unaware of how close they are to each other. Aldo's squadron is attacked by the enemy, Aldo is wounded, and he is forced to land his plane in enemy territory. The Italian air force needs to find a pilot who can reach Aldo, take off, and raise the alarm. Luciano offers his services and, as soon as he learns that the wounded pilot is his son, runs to help him. In a final act of heroism that redeems a lifetime of disappointments, Luciano manages to carry his wounded son to safety despite his own injuries, and dies beside him.

== Production ==
One month after the proclamation of the Italian Empire, the film magazine Lo Schermo announced the upcoming production of a series of films celebrating the Italian colonial adventure in Africa. Two of these films, Luciano Serra Pilot and Scipio Africanus: The Defeat of Hannibal, were to be the first productions at the new Cinecittà studios, which were inaugurated on 28 April 1937. The production effort was enormous. Filming in East Africa took two months in total, often in temperatures of around 40°C. A total of 400 hours of flight time was authorised in Italy and 60 hours in Africa for aerial filming, logistics and location inspections. During the battle scenes, 40,000 rifle shots, 25,000 machine gun shots and 650 bombs (300 weighing three kilos, 150 weighing two kilos and 100 weighing one kilo) were fired. During an inspection flight, the aircraft carrying producer Franco Riganti failed to gain altitude on take-off over the Barca River due to a blocked intake flap caused by sand kicked up by the propeller. The aircraft fell onto its tail and overturned, leaving Riganti and the pilot, Lieutenant Moggi, unharmed.

Notable technical contributions, such as Ubaldo Arata's photography and Giorgio Simonelli's editing, enriched the film, which saw the debut of the musician Giulio Cesare Sonzogno. Roberto Villa, almost a debutant after his role as a telegraph operator in The Great Appeal, appears alongside the protagonist Amedeo Nazzari, now a "first-rate star" in Italian cinema. Nazzari had already starred in Cavalry (1936), another film directed by Alessandrini centred on a heroic officer who dies while fighting in World War I. Luciano Serra, Pilot was considered the defining film of Nazzari's career, establishing him as the leading male star in Italy.

== Cast ==
- Amedeo Nazzari as Luciano Serra
- Germana Paolieri as Sandra Serra
- Roberto Villa as Aldo Serra
- Mario Ferrari as Colonel Franco Morelli
- Beatrice Mancini as Bice Mancinotti
- Egisto Olivieri as Nardini
- Guglielmo Sinaz as José Ribera
- Andrea Checchi as Lieutenant Binelli
- Felice Romano as Mario
- Oscar Andriani as the Military Chaplain
- Nico Pepe as the Count
- Olivia Fried as Dorothy Thompson
- Silvio Bagolini as the Club Member
- Felice Minotti as Andrea

== Bibliography ==
- Bondanella, Peter E. (2001). Italian Cinema: From Neorealism to the Present. Continuum International Publishing Group. ISBN 978-0-8264-1247-8.
- Gundle, Stephen (2013). Mussolini's Dream Factory: Film Stardom in Fascist Italy. New York-Oxford: Berghahn Books. ISBN 978-1782382447.
