= The Twentieth Duke =

- Directed by: Lucio De Caro
- Written by: Lucio De Caro; Ugo Falena (play); Giovanni Quirici; Piero Tellini; Vittorio Vassarotti; Primo Zeglio
- Produced by: Vittorio Vassarotti
- Starring: Paola Veneroni; Roberto Villa; Paola Borboni
- Cinematography: Toni Frenguelli
- Edited by: Maria Rosada
- Music by: Nuccio Fiorda
- Production company: Viva Film
- Release date: 15 July 1945
- Running time: 78 minutes
- Country: Italy
- Language: Italian

The Twentieth Duke (Italian: Il ventesimo duca) is a 1945 Italian comedy film directed by Lucio De Caro and starring Paola Veneroni, Roberto Villa and Paola Borboni. It was shot at the Cinecitta Studios in Rome. It was made in 1943, but its release was delayed for two years. It did not go on a full national release until early 1946. The film is based on a 1925 play by Ugo Falena which had previous been made into films on two occasions The Last Lord (1926) and The Woman Dressed As a Man (1932).

== Synopsis ==
The story tells of the only surviving relative of an old Duke, his granddaughter, who pretends to be a man in order to convince him that the line of succession is secure.

== Cast ==
- Paola Veneroni as Freddie
- Roberto Villa as Il principe Cristiano
- Paola Borboni as La principessa di Danimarca
- Domenico Viglione Borghese as Il vecchio duca di Bressy
- Giuseppe Porelli as Francesco, il domestico
- Lucciana Danieli as Alice
- Daisy Ammon
- Nelly Morgan
- Flora Torrigiani

== Bibliography ==
- Roberto Chiti & Roberto Poppi. I film: Tutti i film italiani dal 1930 al 1944. Gremese Editore, 2005.
