= The Fornaretto of Venice =

1939 film

- Directed by: Duilio Coletti
- Written by: Francesco Dall'Ongaro (play); Luciano Doria; Tomaso Smith; Duilio Coletti
- Produced by: Vittorio Vassarotti
- Starring: Roberto Villa; Elsa De Giorgi; Clara Calamai; Osvaldo Valenti
- Cinematography: Jan Stallich
- Edited by: Maria Rosada
- Music by: Piero Giorgi
- Production company: Vi-Va Film
- Distributed by: Artisti Associati
- Release date: 23 October 1939
- Running time: 73 minutes
- Country: Italy
- Language: Italian

The Fornaretto of Venice (Italian: Il fornaretto di Venezia) is a 1939 Italian historical drama film directed by Duilio Coletti and starring Roberto Villa, Elsa De Giorgi and Clara Calamai. It is an adaptation of the 1846 play of the same title by Francesco Dall'Ongaro, which has been adapted into films on several occasions. It was made at the Cinecittà Studios in Rome.

== Cast ==
- Roberto Villa as Piero Tasca, il Fornaretto
- Elsa De Giorgi as Annetta
- Clara Calamai as Olimpia Zeno
- Osvaldo Valenti as Alvise Duodo
- Enrico Glori as Lorenzo Loredano
- Gero Zambuto as Tasca, il fornaio
- Carlo Tamberlani as Mocenigo
- Letizia Bonini as Elena Loredano
- Ermanno Roveri as Tonin
- Renato Chiantoni as Il sarto testimone al processo
- Pietro Germi as Frate domenicano
- Cesare Polacco as Barnaba
- Stefano Sibaldi as Il parucchiere di Elena
- Mario Ersanilli
- Carlo Mariotti
- Cesare Zoppetti

== Bibliography ==
- Forgacs, David & Gundle, Stephen. Mass Culture and Italian Society from Fascism to the Cold War. Indiana University Press, 2007.
