= The Last Lord =

1926 film directed by Augusto Genina

- Directed by: Augusto Genina
- Written by: Frances Hodgson Burnett (novel); Ugo Falena (play); Augusto Genina
- Starring: Carmen Boni
- Cinematography: Victor Arménise; Carlo Montuori
- Production company: Cinès-Pittaluga
- Release date: 1926
- Country: Italy
- Languages: Silent; Italian intertitles

The Last Lord (Italian: L'ultimo lord) is a 1926 Italian silent comedy film directed by Augusto Genina.

It is based on the 1925 play of the same title by Ugo Falena. Genina remade the play as a sound film in 1932. A further adaptation The Twentieth Duke was released in 1945.

== Cast ==
In alphabetical order

- Oreste Bilancia
- Carmen Boni
- Bonaventura Ibáñez
- Arnold Kent
- Carlo Tedeschi
- Gianna Terribili-Gonzales

== Bibliography ==
- Stewart, John. Italian Film: A Who's Who. McFarland, 1994.
