= Alexander Finta =

American painter

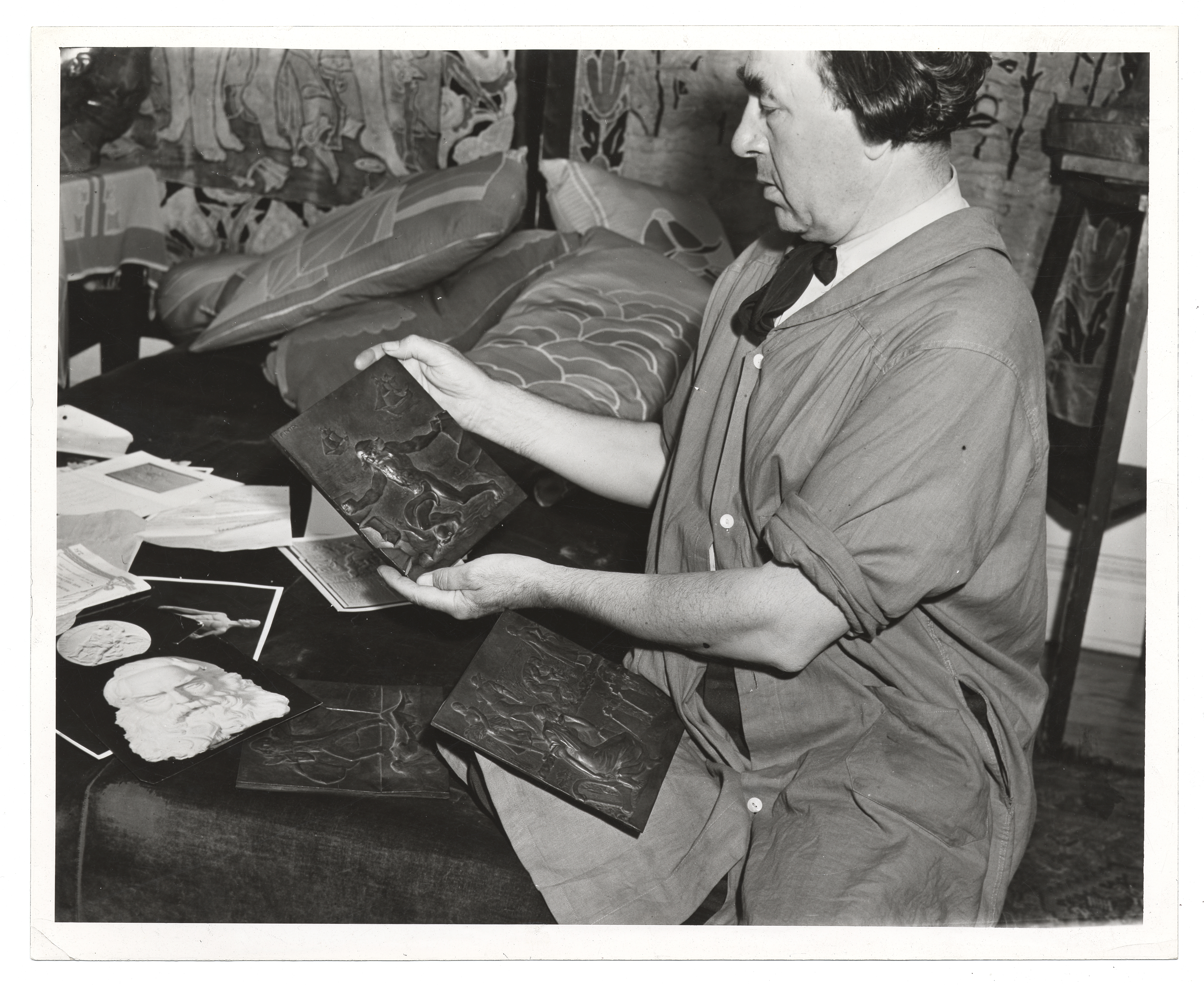
- Born: June 12, 1881; Turkeve, Hungary
- Died: August 3, 1958 (aged 77)
- Education: Columbia University
- Known for: Illustrator; Sculptor
- Notable work: Christ, sculpture for Old Cathedral of Rio de Janeiro; sculpture of Stephen I of Hungary sculpture for St. Stephen of Hungary Church, New York City.

Alexander Finta (1881–1958) was a Hungarian-born American artist. Finta received his early education in Europe before moving onto Columbia University. He settled in Los Angeles, California in 1939 and proceeded to mainly create marble and bronze busts. He worked for 20th Century Fox until his death in 1958.

== Early life ==
Alexander Finta was born in Túrkeve in Hungary on June 18, 1881. He obtained his diploma in mechanical engineering before moving to Budapest and Florence to study art. Finta then traveled to Paris, where he studied with Auguste Rodin. After serving in World War I, he created a number of war memorials. In 1917, he was appointed the "expert in art and archeology" by the Hungarian government.

After the war, the Hungarian Democratic Republic was formed, and to escape internal conflict, Finta moved to Brazil in 1919. In Rio de Janeiro, Finta created many monuments, including Strength, a 12-foot granite statue for the Fluminenci Club. He also created Christ for the Old Cathedral of Rio de Janeiro. While still in Rio, Finta served as the director-in-chief for sculpture for the 1922–1923 Rio World's Fair.

== Life in the United States ==
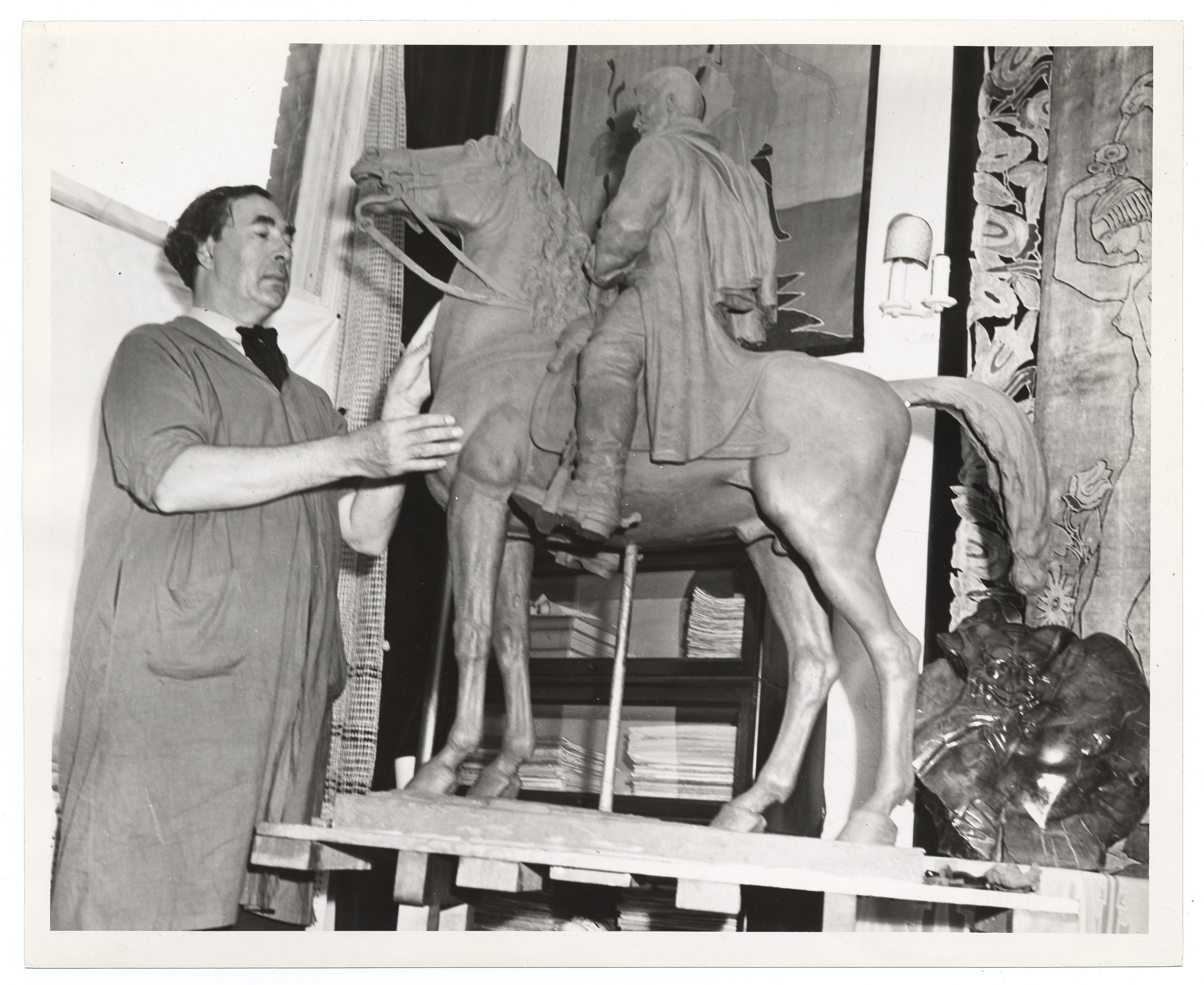
Alexander Finta in 1939

In 1923 Finta moved to New York City to escape the yellow fever outbreaks in Brazil. Seven years later, Finta would be a naturalized citizen. In New York, Finta would create the sculpture of Stephen I of Hungary which resides in St. Stephen of Hungary Church in New York City. The piece was created to commemorate the church's new location on the Upper East Side, which was completed in 1928. Finta would marry his second wife, Catherine, who was a painter and a professor of design. Her own work was shown at the Brooklyn Museum.

In New York, Finta would have commissions from New York's Authors Club, the First Presbyterian Church, the Hungarian Reference Library, Cleveland Public Library, the city's Department of Health, and numerous public artworks within the region. He was also a book illustrator, poet, author and journalist. His most notable book, Herdboy of Hungary: The True Story of Mocskos, was written with Jeanette Eaton. Upon the books release, The New York Times, in 1933, described it as "a book that has the unmistakable ring of truth" with illustrations that display "beauty and strangeness and the vigor of the text."

Around the beginning of World War II, Finta moved to Los Angeles, California. There, he joined the Painters and Sculptors Club of Southern California and from 1944 until 1945 he worked for 20th Century Fox. He died on August 3, 1958.

== Legacy ==
In his will, Finta left the majority of his work to his hometown of Túrkeve; a large portion went to form the collection of the city's Finta Múzeum.

== Notable collections ==
- Patrick Cardinal Hayes, 1927; Metropolitan Museum of Art
