= Lone Journey =

1944 book by Jeanette Eaton

Lone Journey: The Life of Roger Williams
- First edition
- Author: Jeanette Eaton
- Illustrator: Woodi Ishmael
- Language: English
- Genre: Children's literature
- Publisher: Harcourt
- Publication date: 1944
- Publication place: United States
- Pages: 266

Lone Journey: The Life of Roger Williams is a fictionalized children's biography of Roger Williams, champion of religious freedom and founder of Providence Plantation, written by Jeanette Eaton and illustrated by Woodi Ishmael, a woodcut artist. The book earned a Newbery Honor in 1944 after coming in fifth in voting. The New England Quarterly recommended the book in their December 1944 review.
