= Gandhi, Fighter Without a Sword =

1950 biography by Jeanette Eaton

- First edition cover
- Author: Jeanette Eaton
- Publication date: 1950

Gandhi, Fighter Without a Sword is a biography of Mohandas Karamchand Gandhi written for children by Jeanette Eaton. It is illustrated by Ralph Ray. The biography was first published in 1950 by William Morrow & Company and was a Newbery Honor recipient in 1951.
