= Jeanette Eaton =

American writer (1886–1968)

- Born: November 30, 1886; Columbus, Ohio
- Died: February 19, 1968 (aged 81); Central Valley, New York, USA
- Occupation: Writer
- Writing career
- Genre: Children's non-fiction

Jeanette Eaton (November 30, 1886 – February 19, 1968) was an American writer of children's books, primarily biography and history. Four times she was one of the runners-up for the annual Newbery Medal. She was a suffragist and feminist.

== Biography ==
Eaton was born in Columbus, Ohio. She received a Bachelor of Arts degree from Vassar College in 1908 and a Master of Arts degree from Ohio State University in 1910.

Eaton was a supporter of women's rights since at least her college years, giving her first public suffragist speech soon after she finished college. In 1915 she co-authored, along with Bertha Morton Stevens, Commercial Work and Training for Girls, which examined the harsh working conditions of women for that time period. In an article in Harper's Weekly in August 1915 she argued that modern inventions, such as electricity, washing machines, and typewriters, were the "best friend" of women, not suffrage nor education. She also wrote at least one article for The Masses, a periodical published from 1911 to 1917 which had socialist, feminist, and free-love writings. By the late 1920s, she was becoming a recognized writer. She was also an editor for the children's magazine Story Parade. She continued writing for feminist periodicals such as AWA [American Woman's Association] Bulletin and Woman's Journal. Her strong feminist views were readily apparent in a November 1915 article she wrote for The Masses:

"The woman's magazine is the savior of society, man's best friend, the final hope of our chivalric civilization. Woman's ambitions, her independence, the assertion of her own free personality are gradually but certainly inhibited by a few years of such reading".

Her writing, which included many biographies for young adults, has sometimes been thought "melodramatic" and to have "bordered on the overblown", but her biography of Mohandas Gandhi, Gandhi, Fighter Without a Sword (1950, a 1951 Newbery Honor book) "was written in a more muted and understated style". She was given the 1959 Ohioana Award for her 1958 young adult biography of Mark Twain, America's Own Mark Twain. Several of her books were positively reviewed in Boy's Life.

She died in Central Valley, New York. Her papers are held at the University of Minnesota Library, the Children's Literature Research Collections.

== Selected works ==
- Commercial Work and Training for Girls (1915, coauthor with Bertha Morton Stevens)
- The Story of Light (1927)
- The Story of Transportation (1928)
- A Daughter of the Seine: The Life of Madame Roland (1929) (NH 1930)
- Jeanne d'Arc, the Warrior Saint (1931)
- The Flame, Saint Catherine of Sienna (1931)
- Young Lafayette (1932)
- Herdboy of Hungary (1932) (collaboration with Alexander Finta)
- Behind the Show Window (1935)
- Betsy's Napoleon (1936)
- Leader By Destiny: George Washington, Man and Patriot (1938) (NH 1939)
- Narcissa Whitman: Pioneer of Oregon (1941)
- Heroines of the Sky (1942) (coauthor with Jean Adams and Margaret Kimball)
- Lone Journey (1944)
- Lone Journey: The Life of Roger Williams (1944) (NH 1945)
- David Livingstone, Foe of Darkness (1947)
- That Lively Man, Ben Franklin (1948)
- Buckley O'Neill of Arizona (1949)
- Leaders in Other Lands (1950)
- Washington, the Nation's First Hero (1951)
- Gandhi, Fighter Without a Sword (1950) (NH 1951)
- Lee, the Gallant General (1953)
- The Story of Eleanor Roosevelt (1954)
- Trumpeter's Tale: The Story of Young Louis Armstrong (1955)
- The Golden Stamp Book of George Washington (1956)
- America's Own Mark Twain (1958)

NH: Four children's books by Eaton were among the annual Newbery Medal runners-up, now called Newbery Honor Books.
