= Gianna Terribili-Gonzales =

Italian film actress

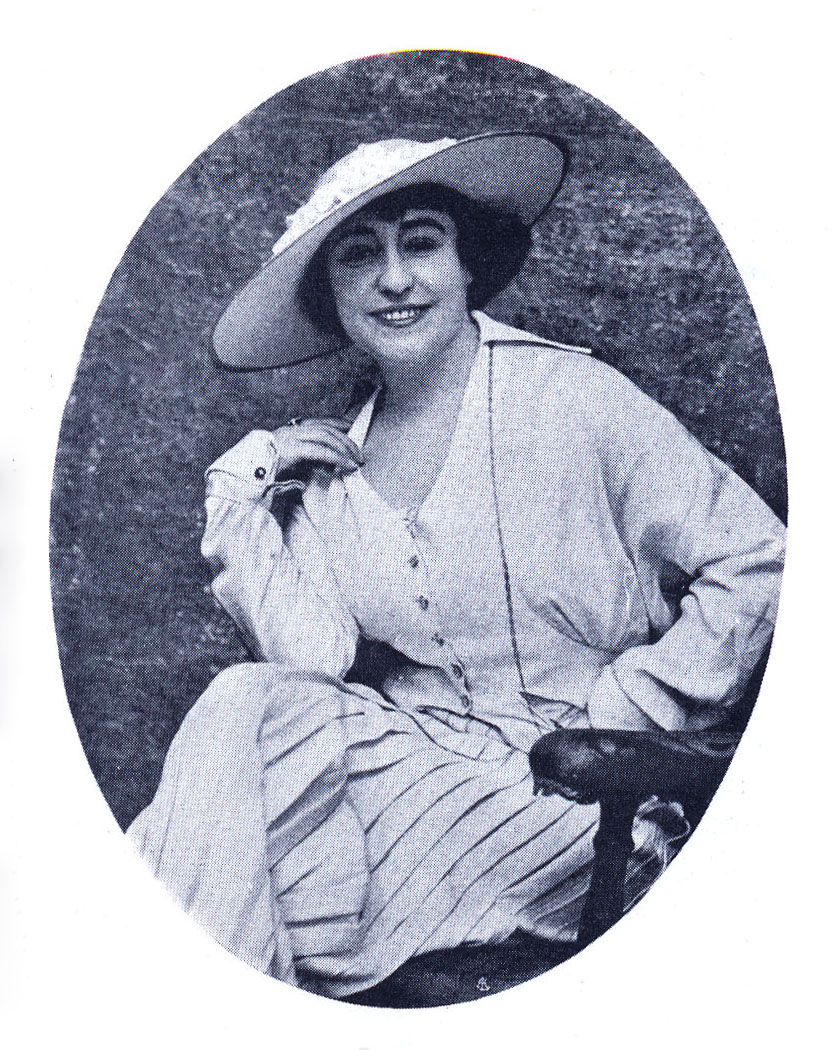
- Gianna Terribili-Gonzales in 1914
- Born: Giovanna Terribili; 5 March 1882; Marino, Italy
- Died: 8 October 1940 (aged 58); Rome, Italy
- Occupation: Actress
- Years active: 1911–1926 (film)
- Notable work: Antony and Cleopatra

Gianna Terribili-Gonzales (1882–1940) was an Italian film actress of the silent era. She appeared in more than forty films including the 1913 historical epic Antony and Cleopatra.

== Selected filmography ==
- Antony and Cleopatra (1913)
- The Last Lord (1926)

== Bibliography ==
- Hatchuel, Sarah; Vienne-Guerrin, Nathalie (2009). Shakespeare on Screen: The Roman Plays. Presses universitaires de Rouen et du Havre. ISBN 978-2-87775-478-1.
