= A Daughter of the Seine =

A Daughter of the Seine: The Life of Madame Roland
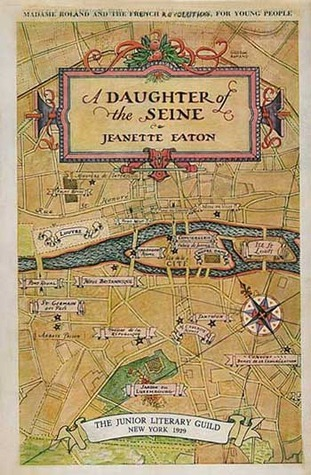
- Author: Jeanette Eaton
- Illustrator: Jeanette Eaton
- Language: English
- Genre: Children's literature / Biography
- Publisher: Harper & Brothers
- Publication date: June 1, 1929
- Publication place: United States
- Pages: 324

A Daughter of the Seine: The Life of Madame Roland is a children's historical fiction biography written and illustrated by Jeanette Eaton. It recounts the life story of Marie-Jeanne Roland de la Platière, an influential figure in the French Revolution. Born in relative obscurity, she became a prominent Girondist and was executed in one of Robespierre's purges. The biography was first published in 1929 and was a Newbery Honor recipient in 1930.
