= Attila in popular culture =

Attila the Hun has had many depictions in popular culture. Many of these depictions either portray him as a great ruler or a ruthless conqueror. Attila has also appeared in numerous German and Norse epics, under the names Etzel and Atli, both with completely different personas. His sudden death remains a fascinating unsolved mystery.

== Naming ==
- Attila is one of the most popular names in Hungary, as for the result of the Royal Court in Hungary proclaimed Attila as the ancestral leader of the ancient Hungarians.

== Hungary ==
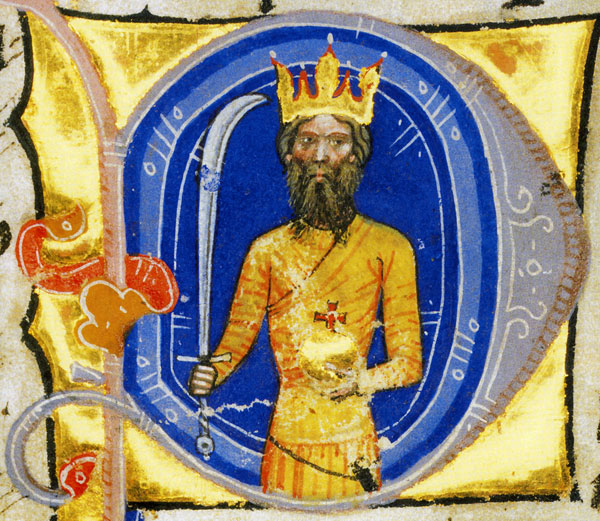
King Attila ((Illuminated Chronicle, 1358)

The basic premise of the Hungarian medieval chronicle tradition that the Huns, i.e. the Hungarians coming out twice from Scythia, the guiding principle of the chronicles was the Hun-Hungarian continuity. The Hungarian state founder royal dynasty, the Árpád dynasty claimed to be a direct descendant of the great Hun leader Attila. Medieval Hungarian chronicles claimed that Grand Prince Árpád of Hungary was the descendant of Attila.

In the 401st year of Our Lord's birth, in the 28th year since the arrival of the Hungarians in Pannonia, according to the custom of the Romans, the Huns, namely the Hungarians exalted Attila as king above themselves, the son of Bendegúz, who was before among the captains. And he made his brother Buda a prince and a judge from the River Tisza to the River Don. Calling himself the King of the Hungarians, the Fear of the World, the Scourge of God: Attila, King of the Huns, Medes, Goths and Danes…

— Mark of Kalt: Chronicon Pictum

Árpád, Grand Prince of the Hungarians says in the Gesta Hungarorum:

The land stretching between the Danube and the Tisza used to belong to my forefather, the mighty Attila.

— Anonymus: Gesta Hungarorum

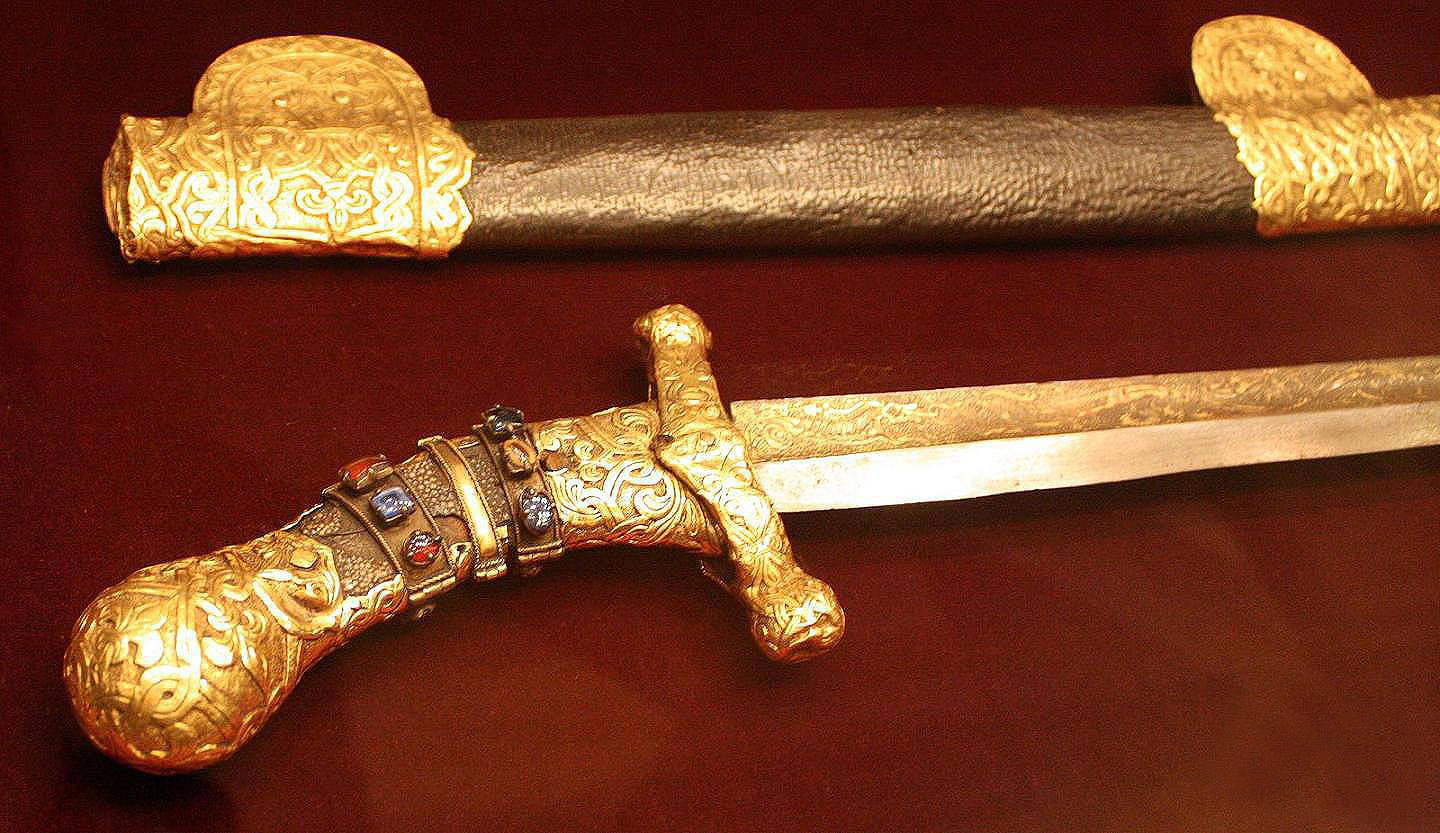
During the reign of King Solomon of Hungary, in the autumn of 1063, Queen Mother Anastasia presented a richly decorated sabre to Otto of Nordheim, Duke of Bavaria. This weapon was esteemed in the Hungarian royal court as the Sword of Attila. According to the Kunsthistorisches Museum, actually a Hungarian sabre from the first half of the 10th.

King Matthias of Hungary (1458–1490) was happy to be described as "the second Attila". The Chronica Hungarorum by Johannes Thuróczy set the goal of glorifying Attila, which was undeservedly neglected, moreover, he introduced the famous "Scourge of God" characterization to the later Hungarian writers, because the earlier chronicles remained hidden for a long time. Thuróczy worked hard to endear Attila, the Hun king with an effort far surpassing his predecessor chroniclers. He made Attila a model for his victorious ruler, King Matthias of Hungary who had Attila's abilities, with this he almost brought "the hammer of the world" to life.

== Depictions of Attila ==
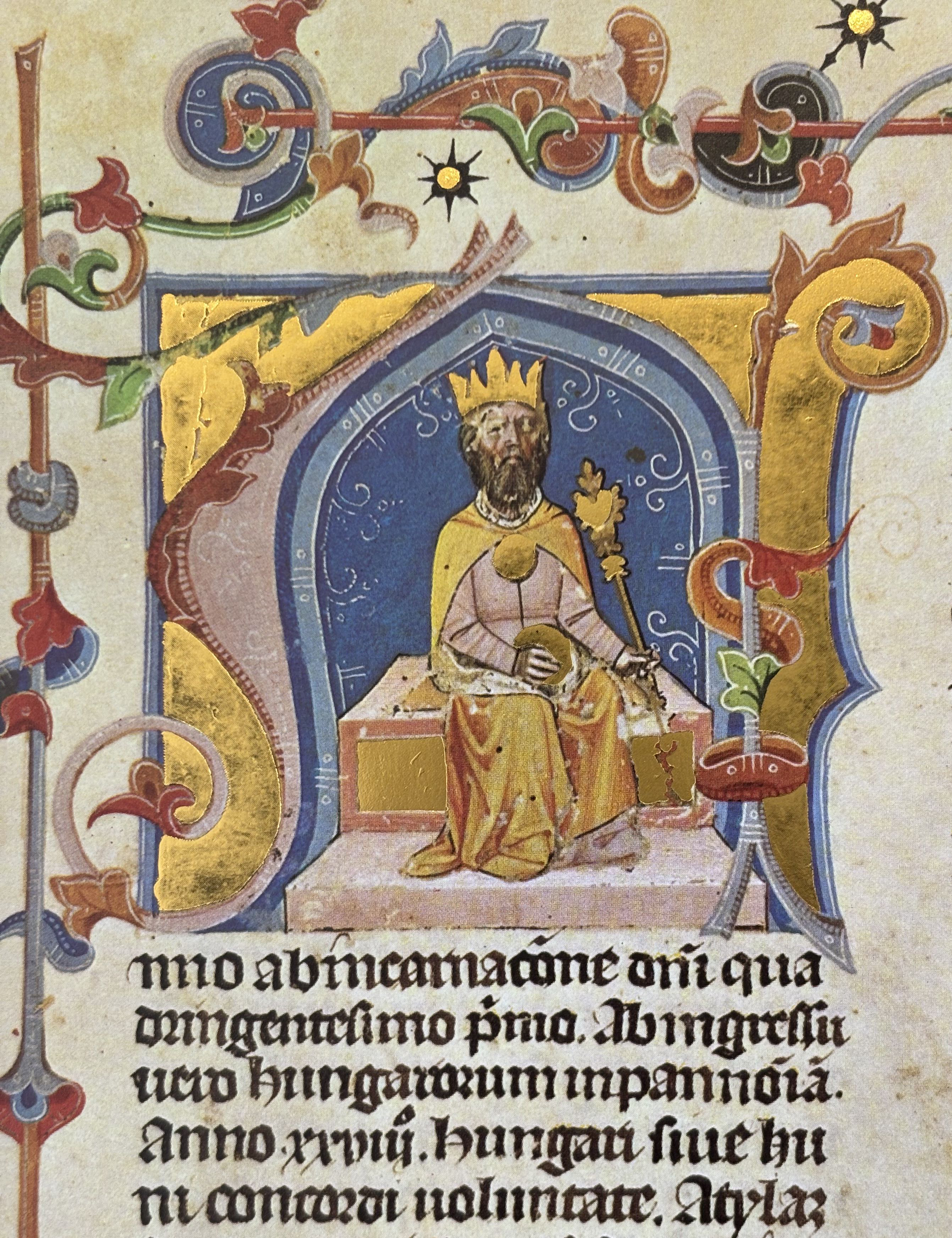
King Attila on the throne, depicted as the first Hungarian king according to the claim by the Hungarian royal court, the claimed ancestor of the Árpád dynasty (Illuminated Chronicle, 1358)

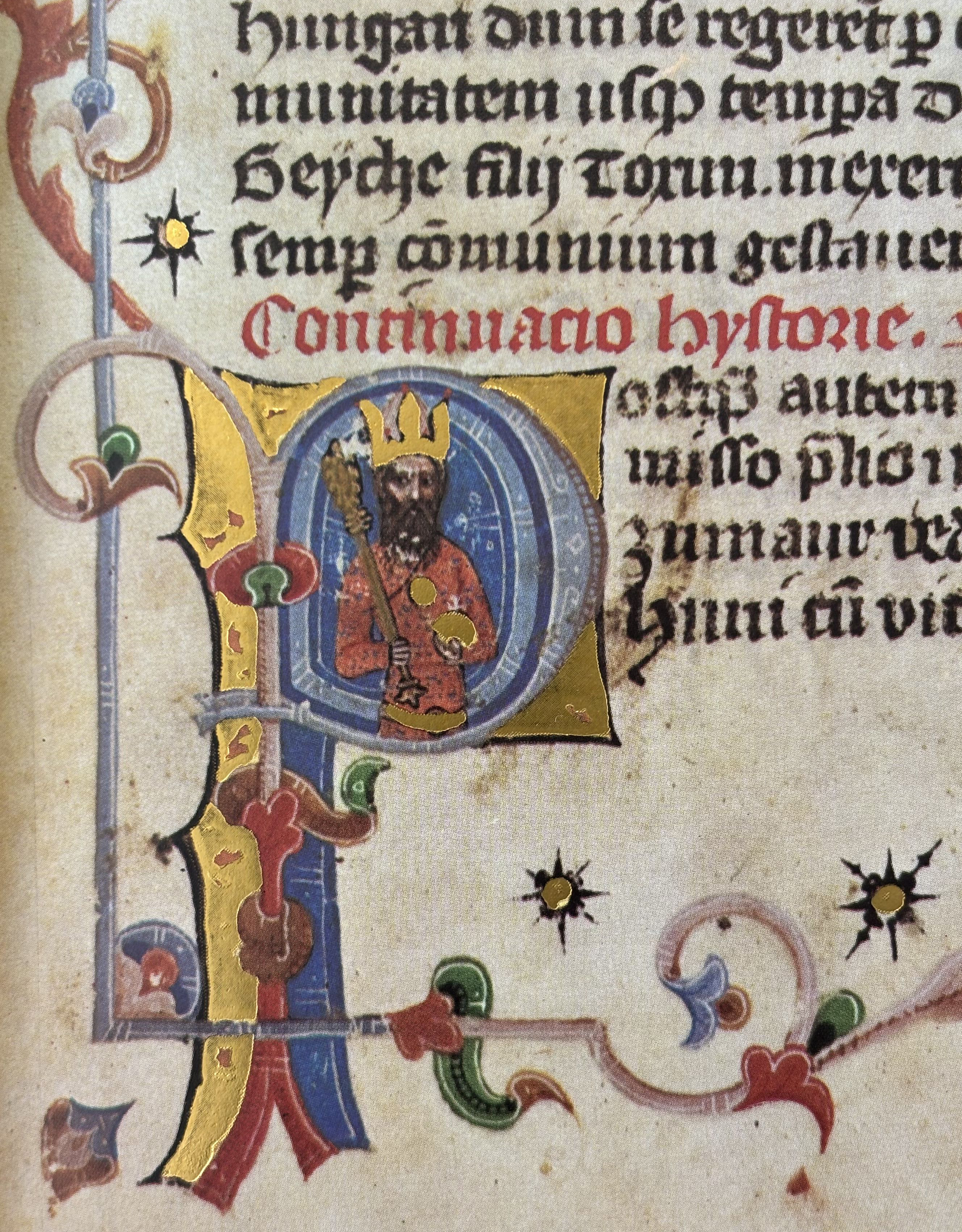
King Attila (Illuminated Chronicle, 1358)

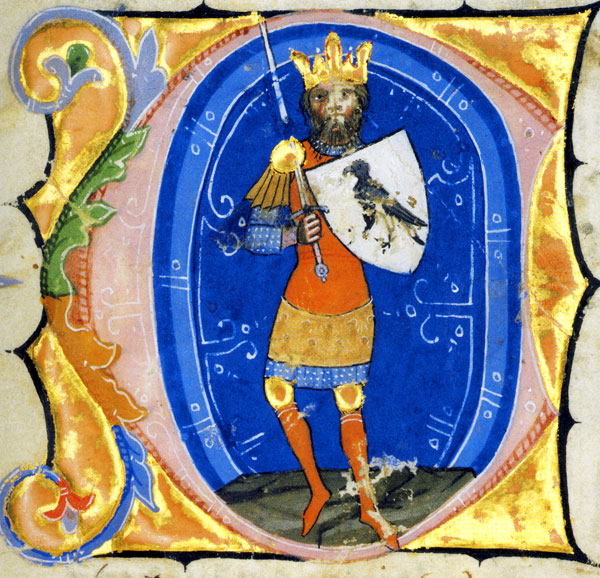
King Attila with the Turul bird in his shield (Illuminated Chronicle, 1358)

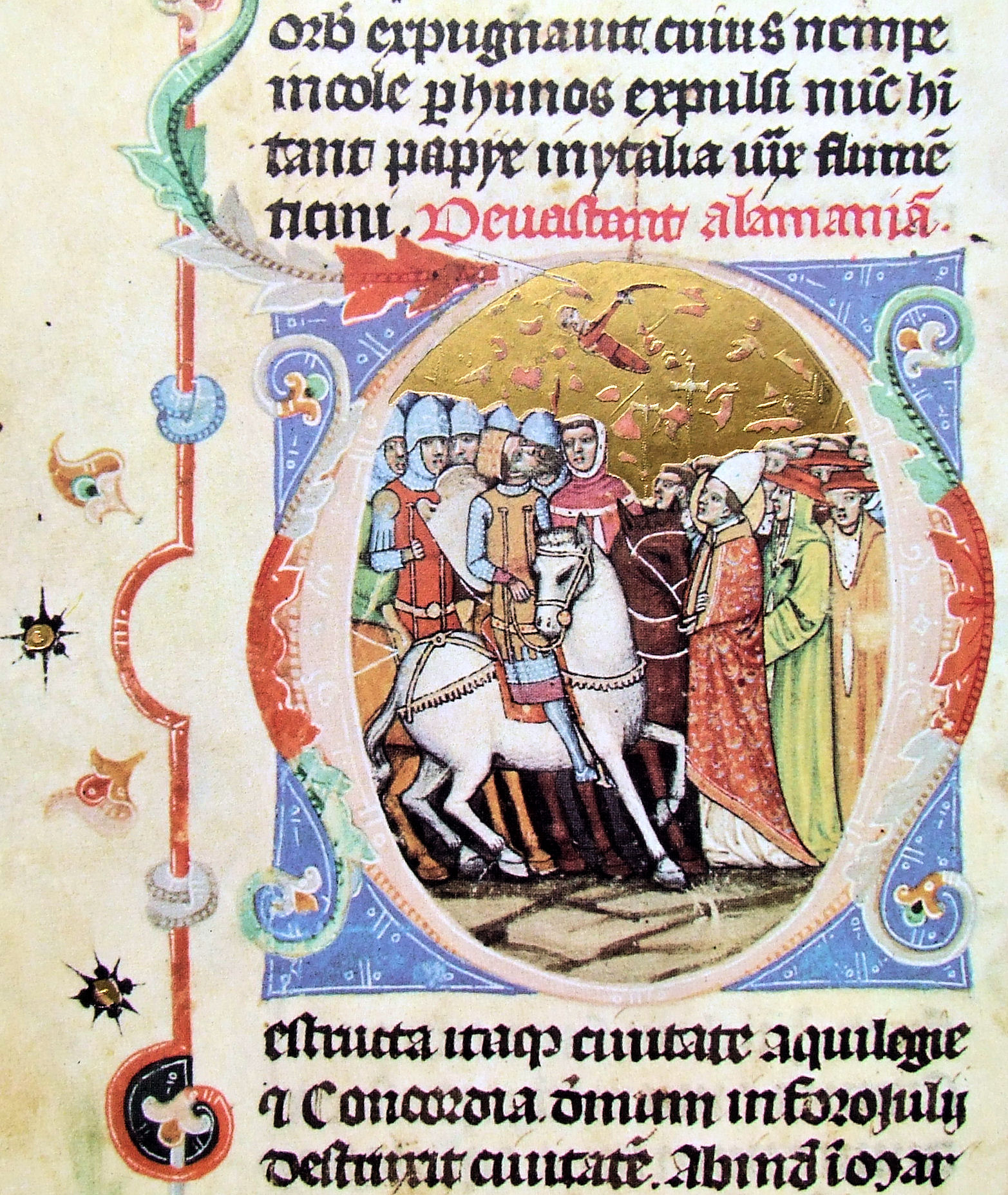
Meeting of Attila with Pope Leo (Illuminated Chronicle, 1358)

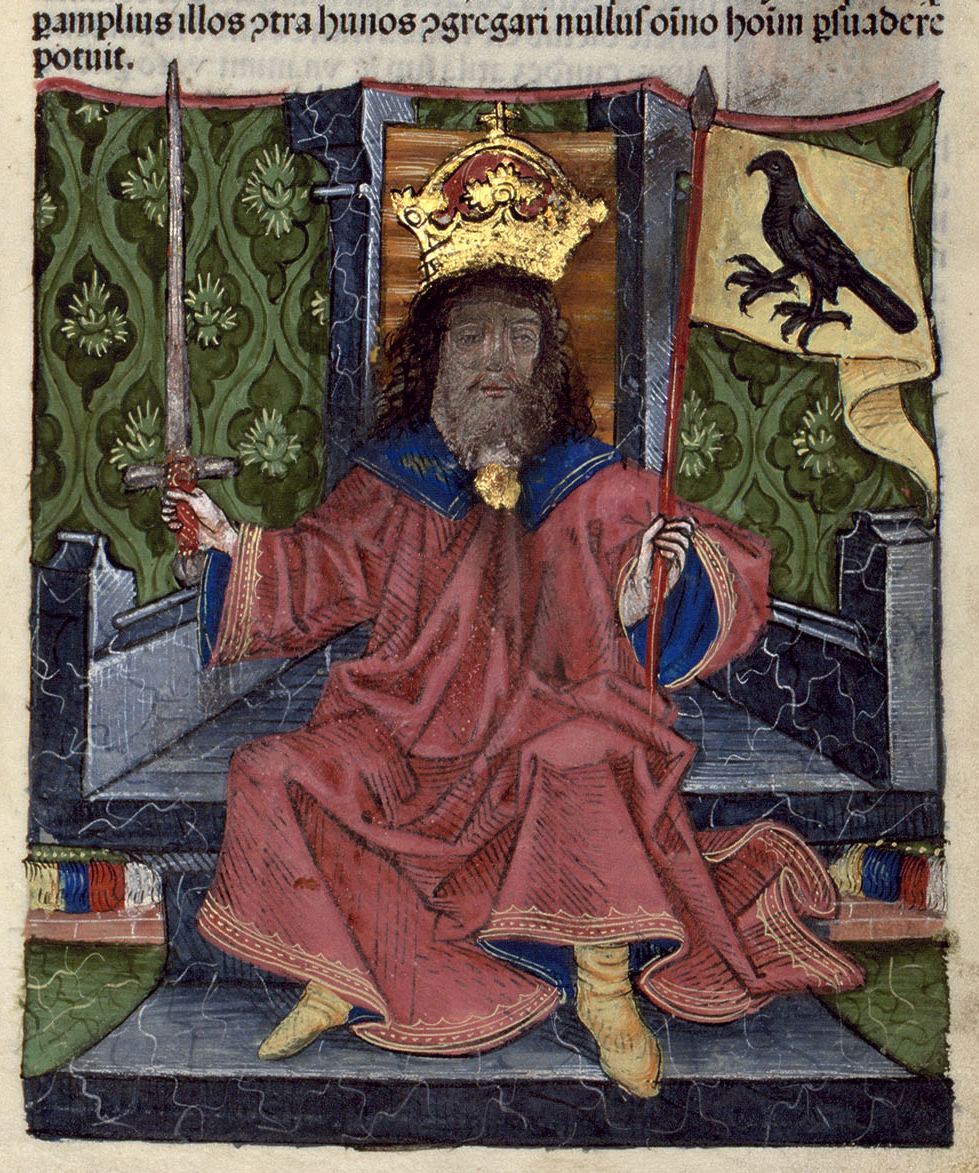
King Attila (Chronica Hungarorum, 1488)

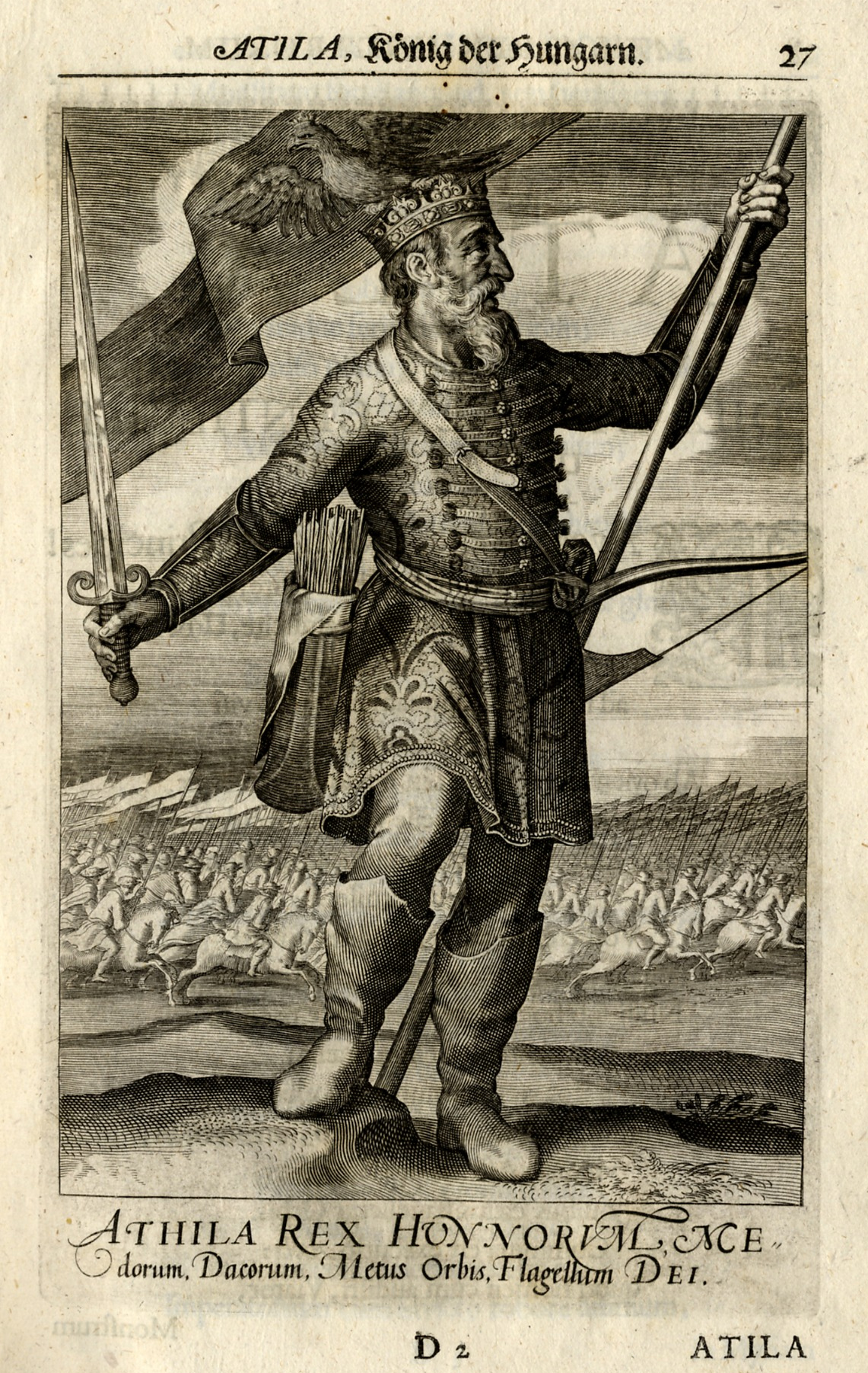
Attila King of the Huns (Nádasdy Mausoleum, 1664)

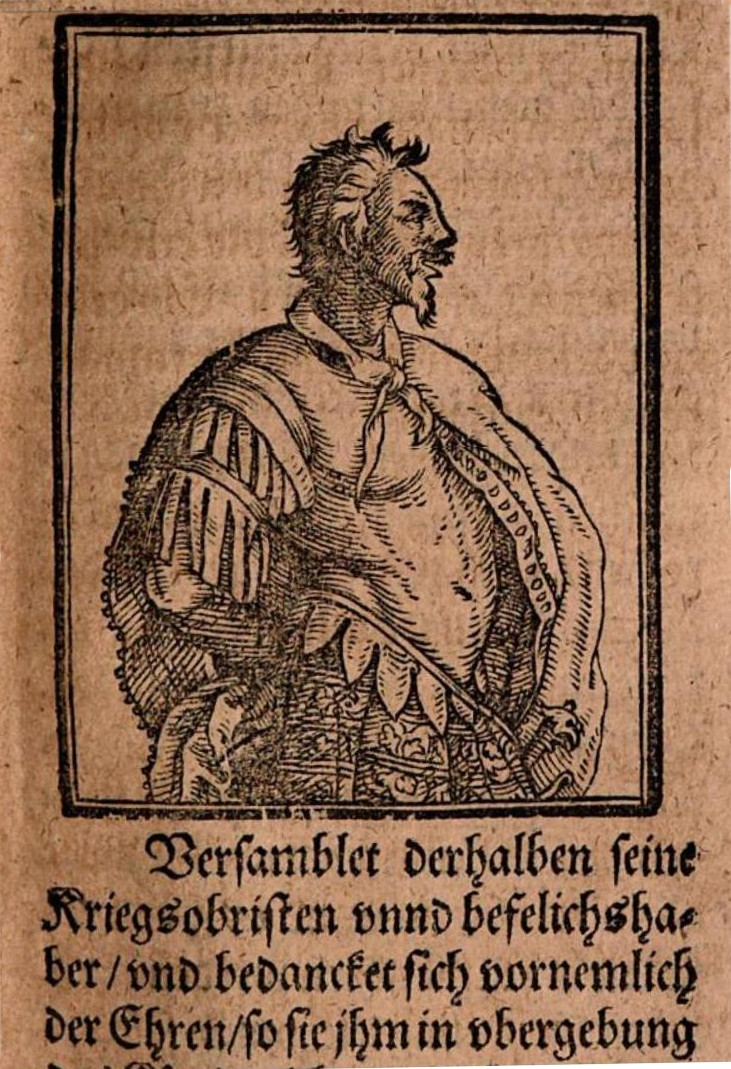
17th-century depiction of Attila the Hun

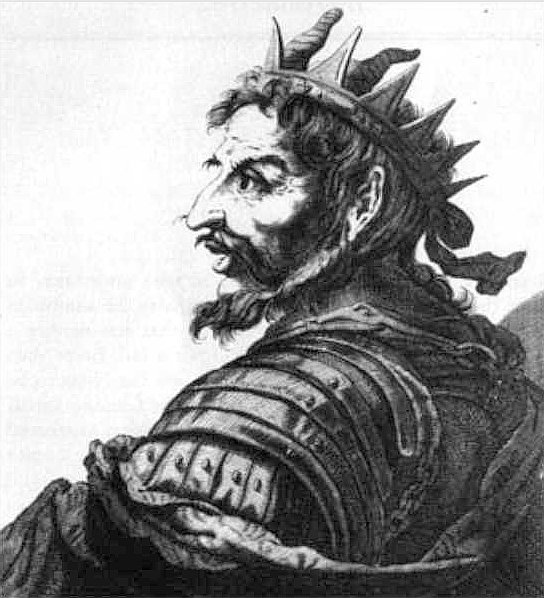
Image of Attila

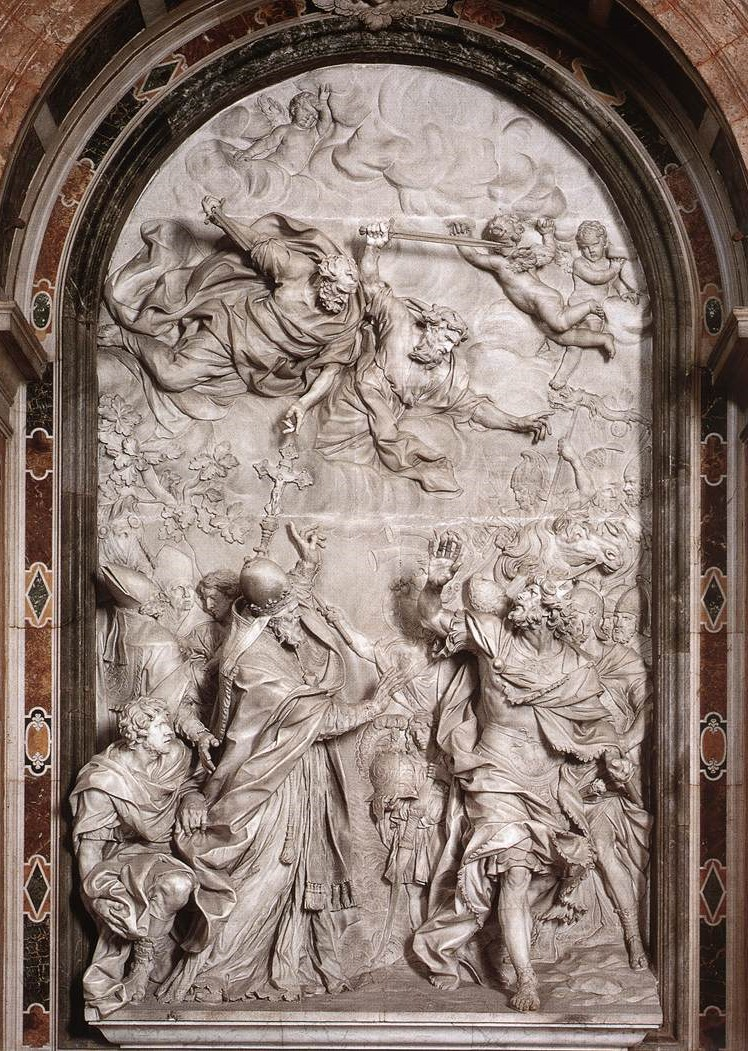
The Meeting of Leo I and Attila by Alessandro Algardi (1646–1653)

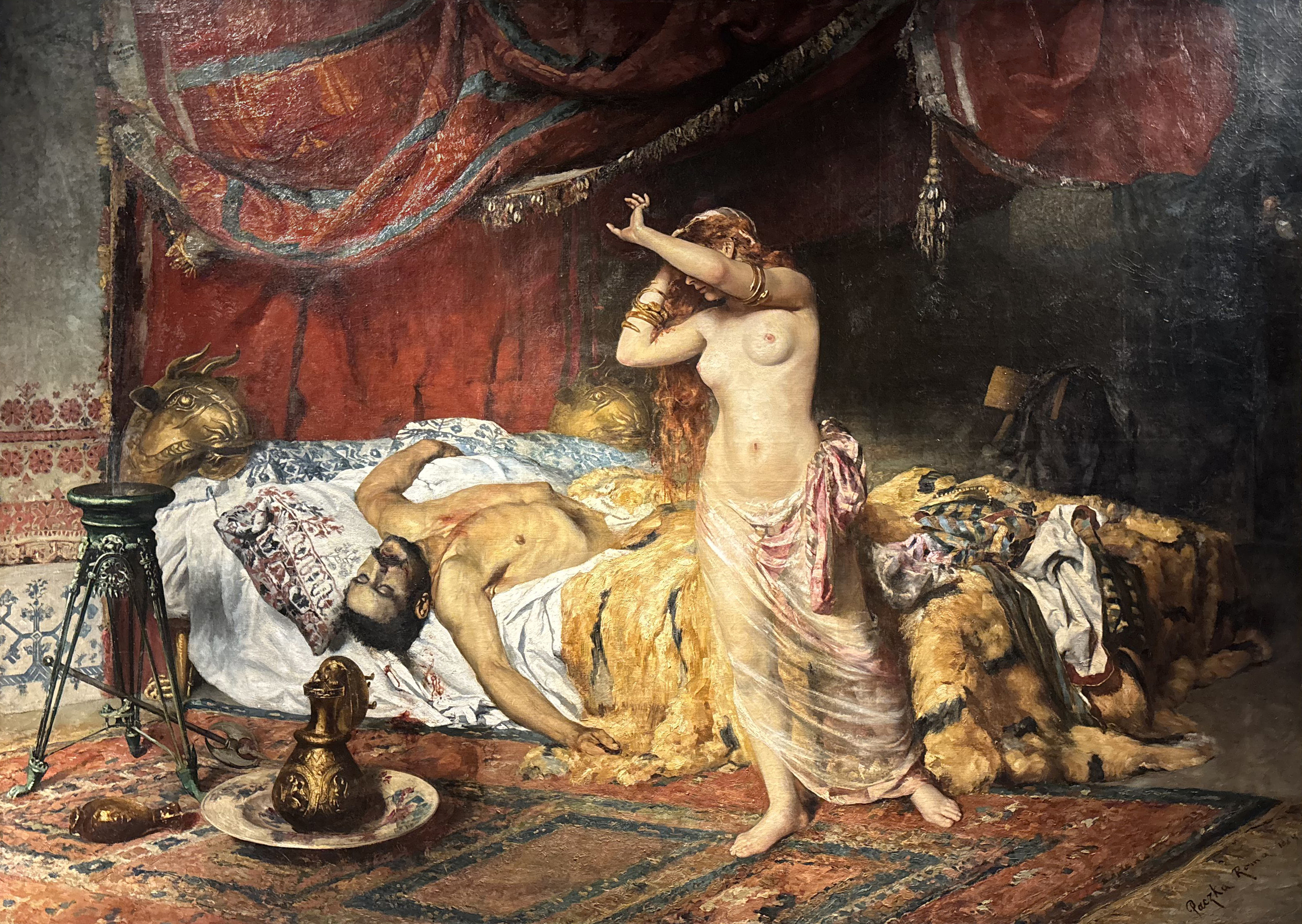
Death of Attila (Ferenc Pazcka, 1884)

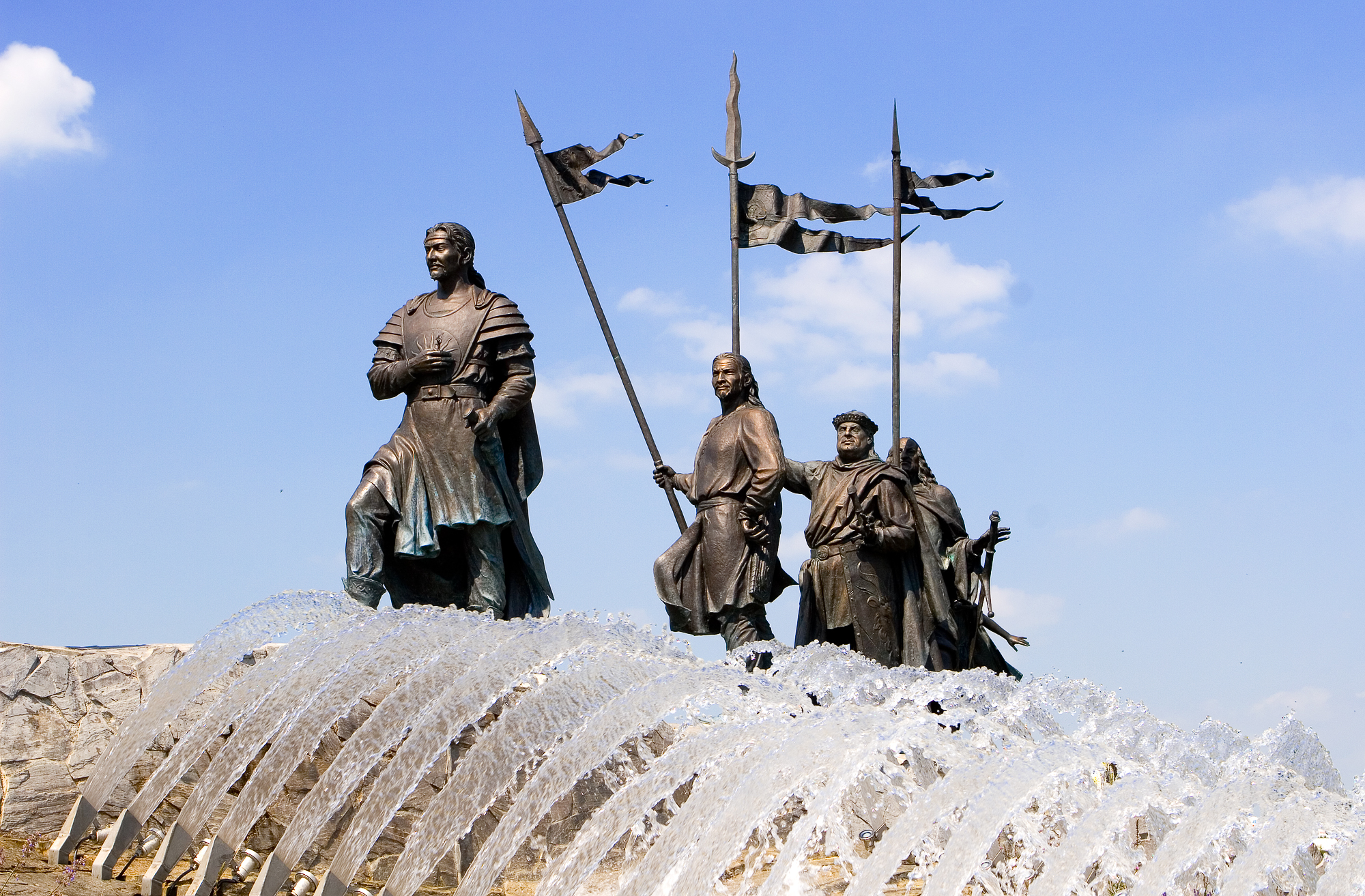
Attila statue in Nibelungs fountain (Tulln, Austria)

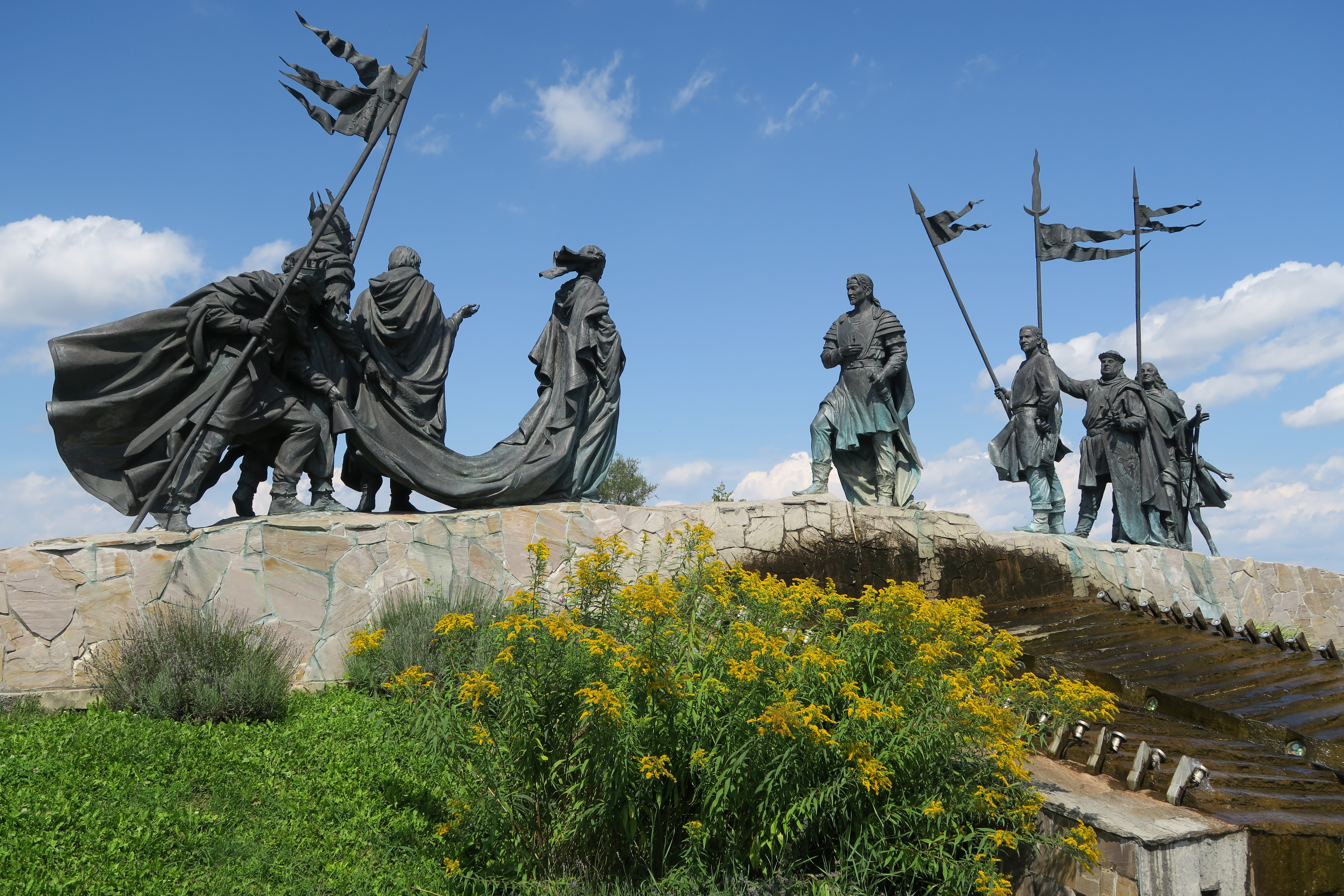
Attila statue in Nibelungs fountain (Tulln, Austria)

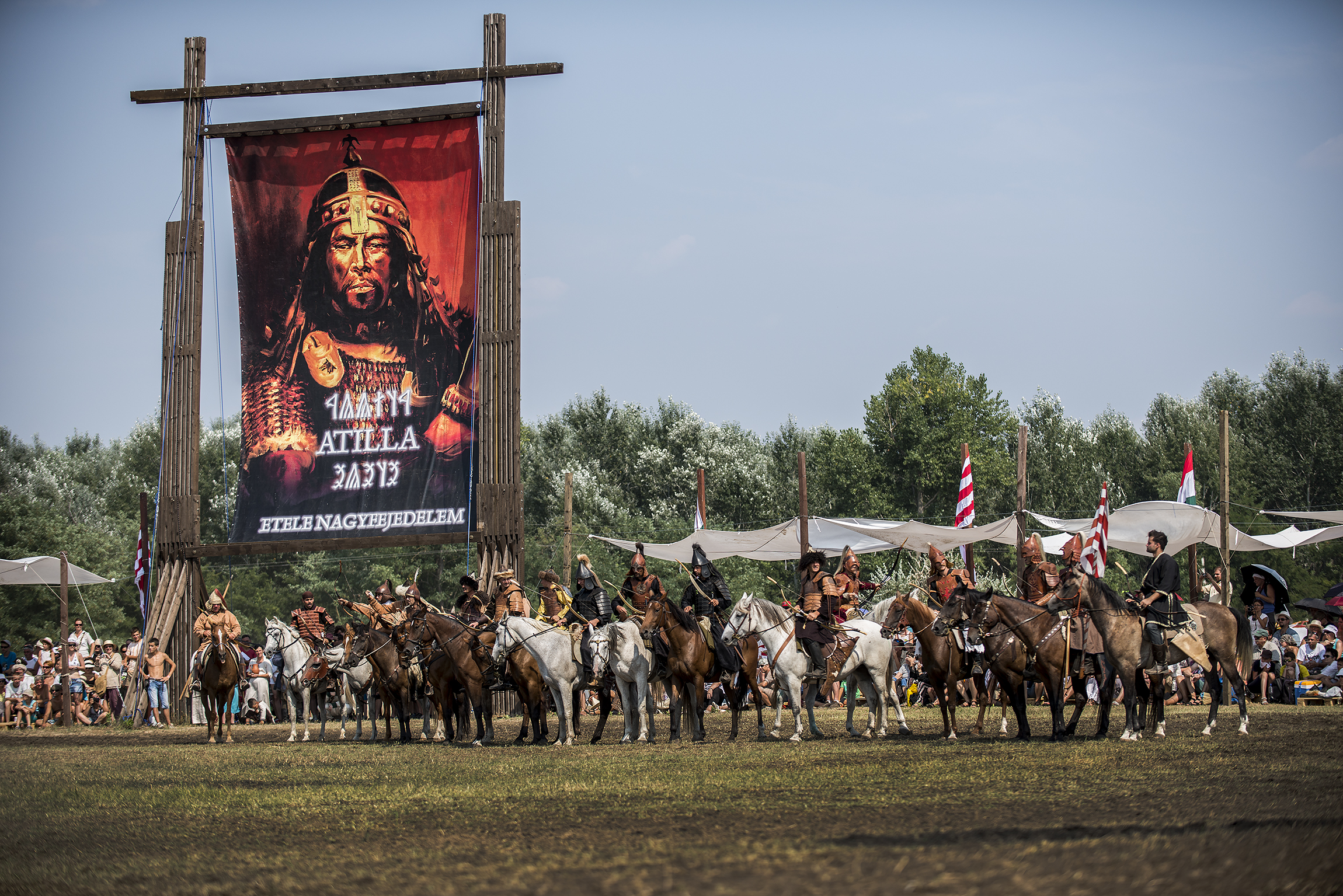
The Attila gate at the Kurultáj annual traditional event in Hungary

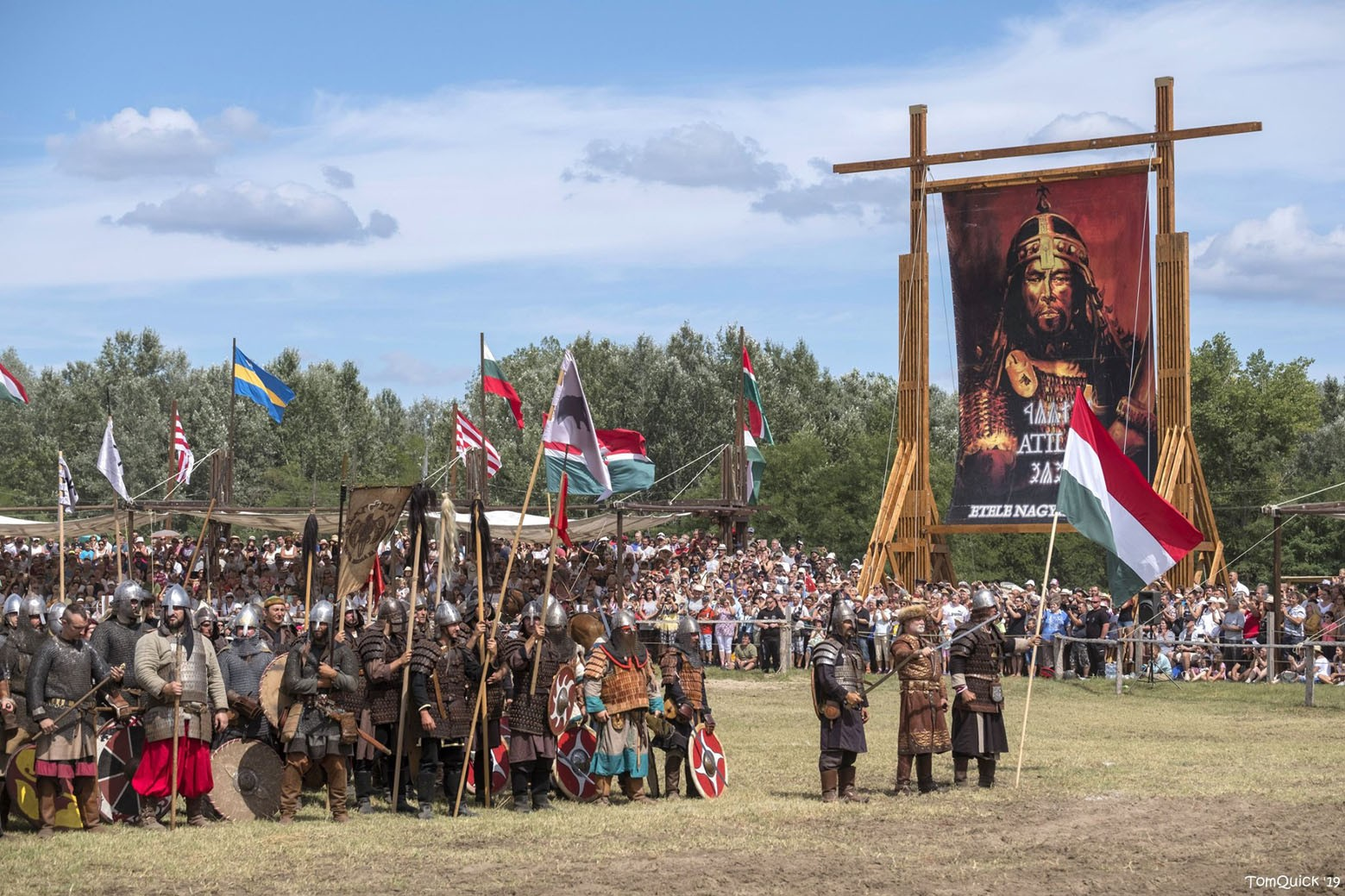
The Attila gate at the Kurultáj annual traditional event in Hungary

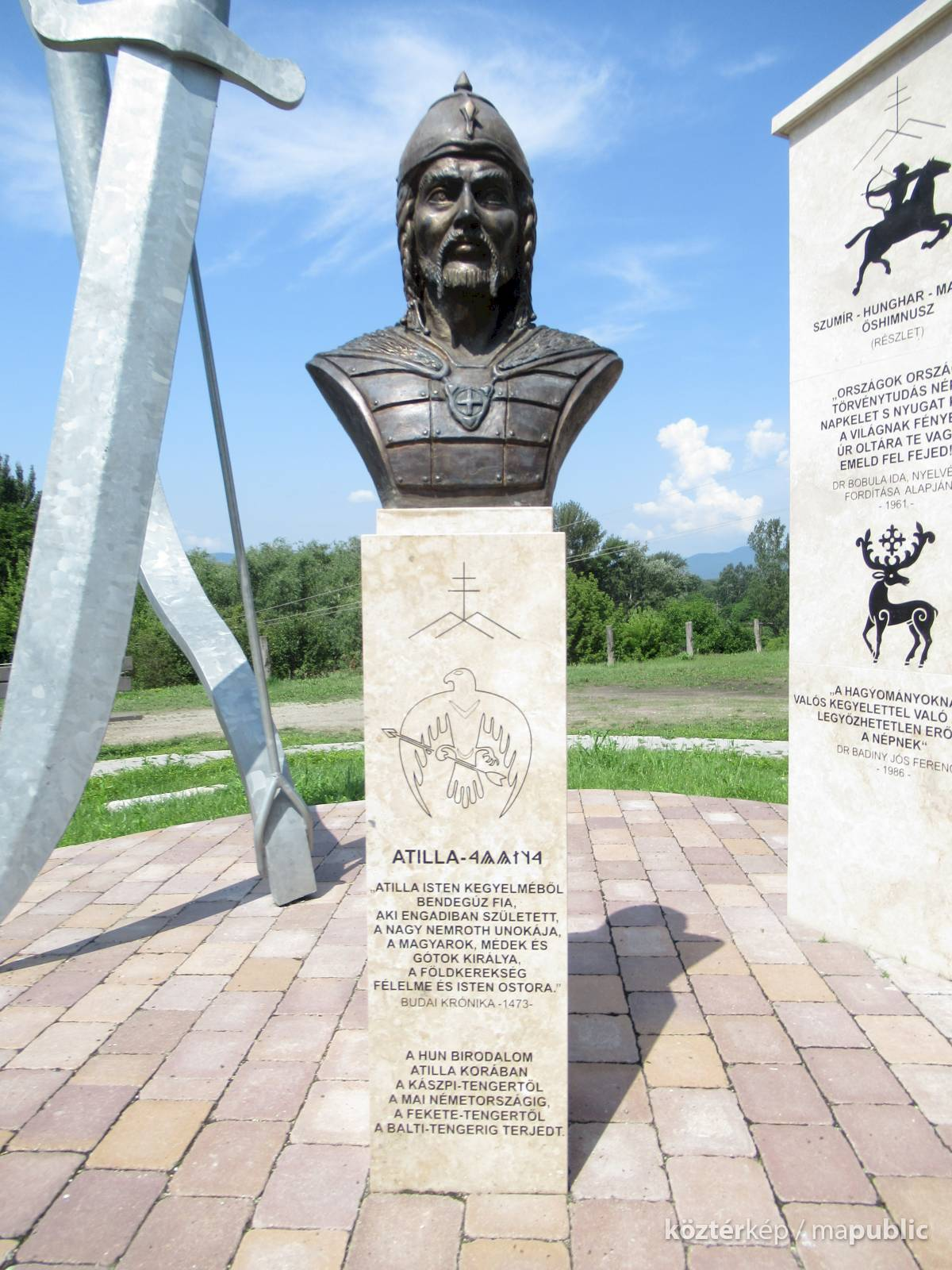
Attila statue (Dunakeszi, Hungary) "Attila son of Bendegúz by the grace of God, who was raised in Engaddi, grandson of the great Nimrod, King of Hungarians, Medes and Goths, the Fear of the World, the Scourge of God." (Buda Chronicle, 1473)

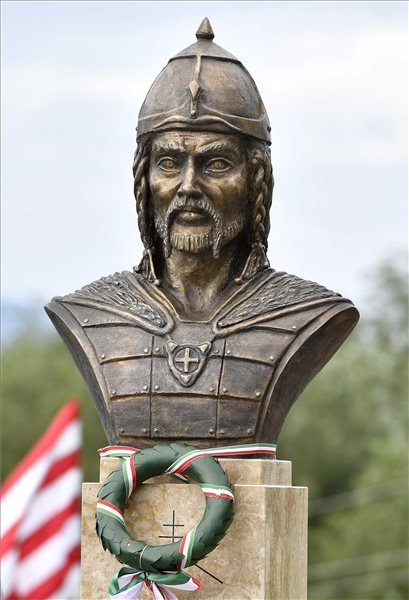
Attila statue (Dunakeszi, Hungary)

== Epic poetry ==
- The German epic poem Nibelungenlied portrays Etzel as a noble and generous ally, while Atli in the Volsunga Saga and the Poetic Edda (as well as Ætla in Widsith) is a cruel miser. It is the latter description which appears in J.R.R. Tolkien's adaptation of the legend, which was published in 2009 and titled, The Legend of Sigurd and Gudrun.
- Attila is briefly mentioned in the Italian epic The Divine Comedy in the outer ring of the seventh circle of the Inferno (Inferno XII 133–138) in which Dante describes Attila as the "scourge of the earth", charging him with the destruction of Florence. However this is a blunder by Dante, who confuses Attila with the Ostrogothic king and warlord Totila.
- Hungarian poet János Arany wrote an epic poem about Attila and his brother Bleda called Buda halála (The Death of King Buda) which is part of a larger work titled A Csaba-trilógia (The Csaba Trilogy).

== Historical fiction ==
- G. P. R. James' Attila (1837) is a three-decker novel about the leader's life.
- Hungarian Géza Gárdonyi's novel A láthatatlan ember (1901) (published in English as Slave of the Huns and largely based on Priscus) offered a sympathetic portrait of Attila as a wise and beloved leader. This reflects the positive way in which Attila, his last wife Ildikó and his brother Bleda are viewed in Hungary and Turkey.
- Dahn, Felix.
- Seredy, Kate wrote the novel The White Stag, the Newbery Medal winning book of 1938, which is a retelling of the legend of the rise of Attila the Hun written in lyric prose.
- Will Cuppy, in his satirical work The Decline and Fall of Practically Everybody (1950), said "Attila's name does not rhyme with vanilla, as it used to in my day. It is now believed that, if children can be taught to accent Attila on the first syllable, things may take a turn for the better."
- Harold Lamb's short story "The Secret of Victory" (1953) features Attila.
- Costain, Thomas. (1959) The Darkness and Dawn is written from the point of view of Nicolan, carried into slavery from his home on the Danube and after many adventures becoming Attila's aide – but also becoming romantically involved with the beautiful Ildico, which is quite dangerous.
- The Death of Attila by Cecelia Holland (1973) takes place in 453, with the tensions and uncertainty of Attila's last year being the background for an unlikely friendship between Tacs, a young, ne'er-do-well Hunnish warrior, and Dietric, son of a Germanic subject king.
- Burgess, Anthony. This British writer wrote a biographical novella about Attila entitled Hun which was published in the story collection The Devil's Mode (1989).
- Stephan Grundy included Attila in his novel Rhinegold, a retelling of the entire Sigurð cycle. (1994)
- Stephan Grundy: Attila's Treasure, Bantam, 1996, ISBN 0-553-37774-4 (1996)
- Dietrich, William. (2005) The Scourge of God: A Novel of the Roman Empire (HarperTorch, ISBN 978-0-06-073508-1) Set in the final days of the Roman Empire, Dietrich's fifth novel follows the attempt of Attila the Hun to conquer the West.
- Ford, Michael Curtis (2005) The Sword of Attila: A Novel of the Last Years of Rome St. Martin's ISBN 978-0-312-93915-1.
- Attila is a powerful and charismatic figure in William Napier's ongoing trilogy, Attila
  - Attila (Orion Books Ltd, 2005, ISBN 0-7528-7787-9).
  - The Gathering of the Storm (Orion Books Ltd, 2007, ISBN 978-0-7528-7433-3)
  - Attila: Judgement (2008).

== Other fiction ==
- Count Dracula in Bram Stoker's novel Dracula claims to be descended from Attila: "What devil or what witch was ever so great as Attila, whose blood is in these veins?"
- R.K. Narayan's Malgudi Days has a chapter on a mongrel dog named after Attila, King of the Huns.
- Wess Roberts has used Attila as a fictional mouthpiece for his thoughts on management, "Leadership Secrets of Attila the Hun" and "Victory Secrets of Attila the Hun".
- The plot of Clive Cussler's 2012 thriller, The Tombs, revolves around a fictional race to discover Attila the Hun's tomb and multiple caches of secret treasure, between competing groups of treasure-hunters/archaeologists and an eastern European crime syndicate.
- In Poul Anderson's novel The Dancer from Atlantis, four time-travelers from different periods are accidentally thrown together. When the American protagonist finds that one of his fellow castaways is a Hunnish warrior, he asks him about Attila – but the Hun is from an earlier period, and had never heard the name.

== Non-fiction ==
- In the 2011 book The Global Industrial Complex: Systems of Domination, Sociologist David Nibert compared the animal–industrial complex to Attila the Hun for the complex's being destructive in its ruthless pursuit of resources such as land and water to rear all animals as a source of profit.

== Film and television ==
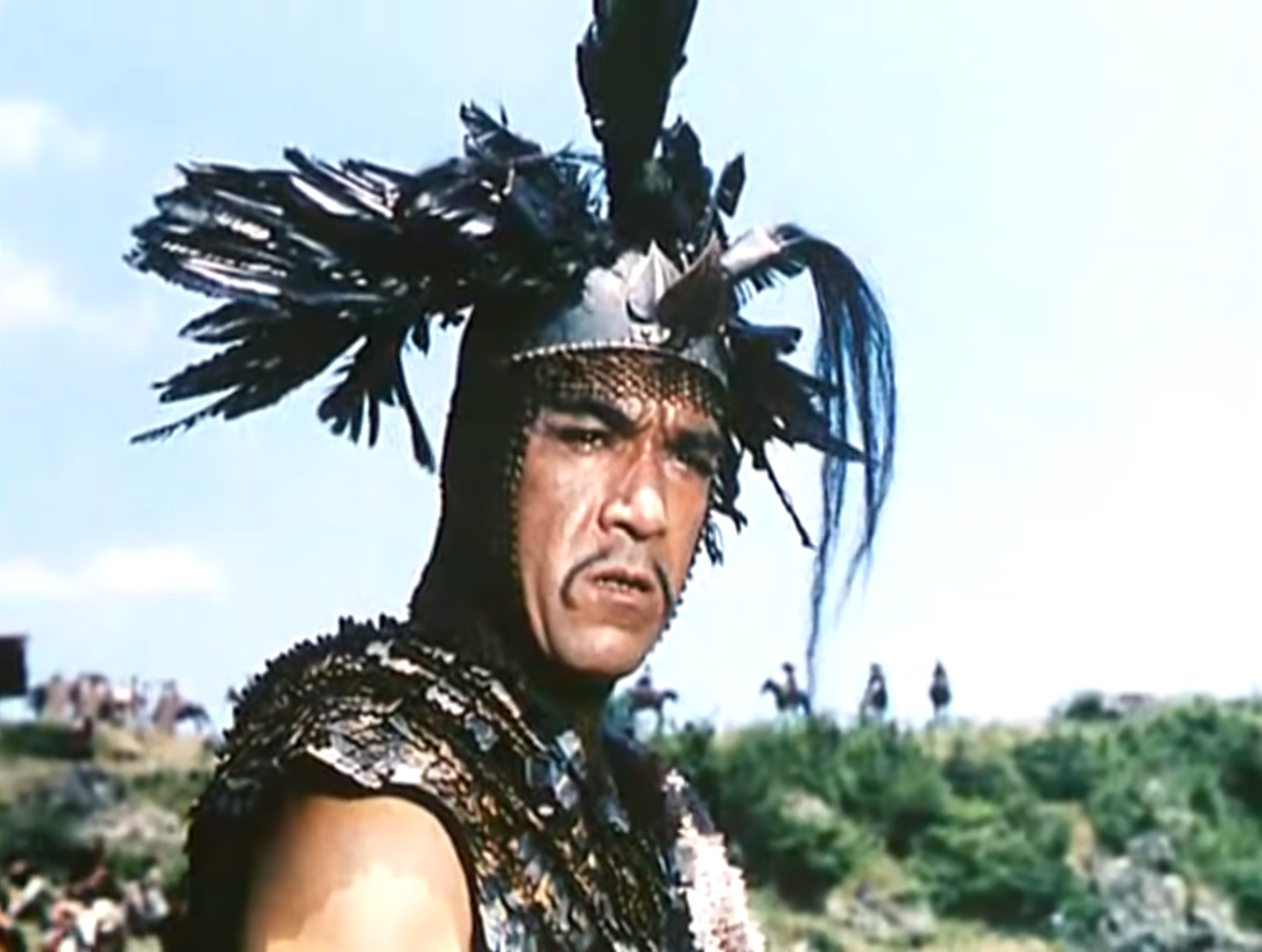
Attila portrayed by Anthony Quinn in Attila

- A TV miniseries, Attila, which was produced in 2000 and was broadcast in 2001, stars Gerard Butler as Attila and Powers Boothe as Flavius Aëtius. Directed by Dick Lowry and written by Robert Cochran. Winner of 2002 ASC award and nominated for 2 Golden Reel awards.
- Anthony Quinn played the title role in Attila, a 1954 Franco-Italian film, co-starring Sophia Loren as Honoria.
- Attila was portrayed by Jack Palance in Douglas Sirk's Sign of the Pagan (1954).
- Attila was portrayed by Rudolf Klein-Rogge in Fritz Lang's 1924 fantasy epic Die Nibelungen: Kriemhild's Revenge where he is a main and sympathetic character in this retelling of the Nibelungenlied and the Siegfried legend.
- In 2016's History Channel docu-drama mini-series, Barbarians Rising- several 'barbaric' leaders are explored in the context of the rise and fall of Ancient Rome, including Attila- played by Romanian actor Emil Hostina.
- In an episode of "The Dick Van Dyke Show," Rob Petrie sings:

I'm in love, I'm in love with Attila the Hun,
Attila the Hun, Attila the Hun!
Though he'll pillage a village and kill everyone,
I still love Attila the Hun
Attila the Hun, Attila the Hun
I still love Attila the Hun!

- In the Garfield and Friends episode Fine-Feathered Funny Man, Roy dresses up as a warrior with fake arrows pretending to have been speared and lies to Wade the Duck that Attila the Hun is coming. Wade the Duck stated that Attila the Hun was dead for 1500 years, then Roy states that's what he wants them to believe. Wade then panics and runs for his life with Roy laughing.
- One episode of BBC's docudrama Heroes and Villains features Attila.
- Patrick Gallagher played Attila in the 2006 movie Night at the Museum, as a misunderstood and abused man looking for someone to reach out to. In the film he appears to be of Asian ancestry, having more in common with the Mongols than the actual Huns, and it's possible that the character may have originally been written to be Genghis Khan. Gallagher reprised the role in the sequels, Night at the Museum: Battle of the Smithsonian in 2009 and Night at the Museum: Secret of the Tomb in 2014.
- Monty Python in one episode, presented a parody of a sitcom entitled, The Attila the Hun Show! and later an animated Attila the Bun Show.
- Attila the Hun appeared in the Jimmy Neutron: Boy Genius episode Carl Wheezer, Boy Genius, when Carl mistakenly brought him back instead of a Swedish poet as he intended to. In this series, he is voiced by Jim Cummings. Also, in another, a comedian clone of Jimmy said that a bad clone of Jimmy is so bad, he makes Attila look like Bambi.
- On the Simpsons episode "Simpsons Roasting on an Open Fire", Bart mentions Attila towards the end of the song "Rudolph the Red-Nosed Reindeer". Homer strangles him for doing so.
- Attila the Hun appeared in an episode of Johnny Test, who was brought by Johnny and Dukey to help the weakest hockey team, The Porkbelly Ice Pigs, along with a caveman, vikings, a Mongolian warrior, and a knight.
- In the movie a.w.o.l, Jean-Claude Van Damme's final opponent is a huge fighter named Attila, who is played by Abdel Qissi. Attila is not only a large fighter, he is known for first toying with his opponents, then tearing them apart ruthlessly.
- In the episode "Kif Gets Knocked Up a Notch" of Futurama, Attila was one of several simulations of evil characters accidentally brought to life (others included Jack the Ripper and Professor Moriarty).
- In the anime Pokémon, two members of Team Rocket are named Attila and Hun.
- The History Channel's Ancients Behaving Badly episode Attila the Hun (History Channel, A&E Television Networks, original airdate 2009-11-13) features Attila, naming him "history's first great terrorist" interested only in "naked power and money", "creating nothing, building nothing" and scoring the highest (worst) score on the show's "psycho-meter", finding Attila one of the greatest psychopaths in history.
- The second episode of season two of Spike TV's Deadliest Warrior, which features computer simulated battles between historical warriors, features Attila the Hun versus Alexander the Great, in which Attila defeated Alexander, winning 596 fights out of 1000.
- One of the Punk Frogs in the 1987 Teenage Mutant Ninja Turtles cartoon was named Atila the Frog.
- The villain of Superman III, Ross Webster, attributes the following quote to Attila the Hun, "It is not enough that I succeed. [But] everyone else must fail."
- Attila the Hun appeared in the episode "Damn Bundys" of the television show Married... with Children in which he played football for the devil's team.
- Attila makes a few appearances in the French series Kaamelott, in which he attempts to ransom King Arthur for British gold. In the series, Arthur encounters Attila expecting to meet the bloodthirsty conqueror everyone is afraid of, but instead faces a short, nervous, comically naïve warrior commanding an army of two (including himself), who always gets persuaded out of Britain without a fight. This version of Attila, played by Vietnamese actor Lan Truong, is depicted as Eastern Asian, including a fake Chinese accent.
- A line in the Animal House theme song says "Chip, Doug and Greg, they're second to none/They studied under Attila the Hun".
- On Animaniacs, Atilla was the subject of two separate shorts: the first, "Valuable Lesson", opens with him being harassed by the Warners, before they are abruptly taken away by obnoxious network censors. Seeking revenge, Attila follows them to the network (committing acts of vandalism along the way) and corners the kids, but ends up pummeling the censors instead when they call him a "naughty man." His other appearance is in a musical number, "Here Comes Attila", in which Yakko sings about his exploits, facetiously adding that he liked to steal trivial items like socks and pillows.
- One of the verses in the Pinky and the Brain musical short "A Meticulous Analysis of History" is about Attila. Brain describes him as having "ransacked Asia Minor just for fun" and cites his defeat at the Battle of the Catalaunian Plains.
- In Love and Death, Boris and Sonja are debating the morality of their plan to assassinate Napoleon. She says, "Violence is justified in the service of mankind." He asks, "Who said that?" She answers, "Attila the Hun."

== Music ==
- In 1846 Giuseppe Verdi composed an opera, Attila, based on the play Attila, König der Hunnen ("Attila, King of the Huns") by Zacharias Werner.
- In 1981, American progressive-jazz-rock group Dixie Dregs released Unsung Heroes, voted best guitar album of 1981 by the readers of Guitar Player magazine. Track 6 is called "Attila the Hun".
- In 1993, Hungarian musician Levente Szörényi premiered his rock opera titled Attila-Isten kardja ("Attila, Sword of God").
- The 1994 debut album of the Norwegian black metal band Dimmu Borgir has a song entitled "Hunnerkongens Sorgsvarde Ferd Over Steppene" ("The King of the Huns' Sorrowful Black Journey Across the Steppes" in English). The song, as the title suggests, is about Attila.
- In the song "Say What You Say" by Eminem, from his 2002 album The Eminem Show:

"When I was little I knew I would / blow up and sell a mil' or / grow up to be Atilla, / go nuts and be a killa."

- In the song I'm Bad by LL Cool J, from his 1987 album Bigger and Deffer:

″You're a novice I'm noble and I decipher my tongue/ not Attila the Hun nor Abdullah his son″.

- The song Attila from Iced Earth's 2004 album The Glorious Burden relates to the events around the Battle of Chalons.
- The song Atilla from album Fhoenix 2011 Russian metal-bands Aria.
- Rapper Watsky refers to Attila in his 2012 song "Gummy Bear Hundrednaire" with the lyrics "I'm working on my Carter flow/I'm Atilla the Hun/I'm bucking the run of mill/I'm a fucking gorilla/I'm coming to thrill 'em/and I'm no bigger than a garden gnome."

== Exhibitions ==
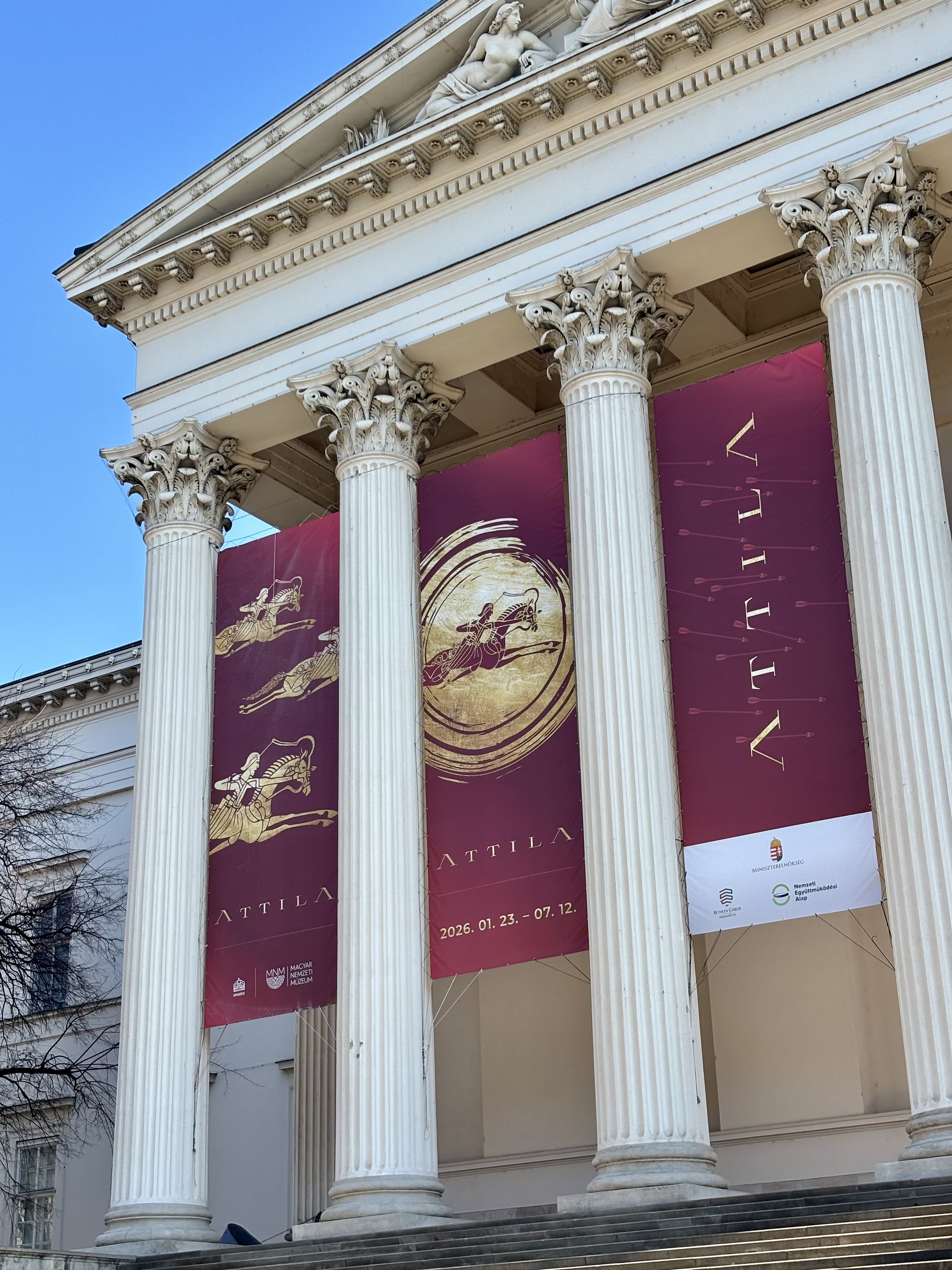
Hungarian National Museum - Attila exhibition, 2026

In 2026, an exhibition called Attila opened at the Hungarian National Museum, with 400 artifacts from 64 museums across 13 countries.

== Comics ==
- BD series Attila... mon amour of Franck Bonnet published in six albums by Glénat from 1998 to 2003 is the story of a relationship between Attila and the fictional feral woman Luva.
- The syndicated comic strip Hägar the Horrible features Attila as an occasional rival to main character Hägar.
- The comic strip witch Broom Hilda is Attila's ex-wife.
- In Fawcett Comics, one of the four historical villains the Captain Marvel villain Ibac gets his powers from are Attila, who gives him fierceness. Attila appears in Ibac's first appearance where Lucifer summons up the beings that give Ibac power. In another story, he is in a limbo-like state with the other three villains and is able to telepathically communicate with Ibac and take away his powers when he fails. In an earlier story, the mad scientist Doctor Sivana brings Attila back to life using a reincarnation machine, but sends Attila back with Cap's help when Attila tries to take over from him. Attila is shown as possessing superhuman strength, able to break three men's necks with a single blow.
- In All-Star Comics #38 he is one of a group of historical villains who are committing murders and battle the Justice Society of America, Attila murders Johnny Thunder. They are revealed to all be a wax museum guard in disguise, who is killed at the end when he falls into a vat of hot wax.
- In Leading Comics #3 he is one of five historical tyrants summoned up by Doctor Doome to steal materials to power his time machine and send him into the Future. He tries to steal Tantalum in South Dakota, but is defeated by the Vigilante and returns to his own time.
- The Far Side depicts a vagrant who is nearly assaulted by soldiers from upon high on the castle walls. The comic captures the man at a moment of panicked explanation in which he says "No, No....I'm Al Tilly, The Bum."
- In the Turkish comic named Tarkan, the character Tarkan is Attila's raider. Attila appears here as a supporting character. This comic was later filmed in a series of Turkish movies, which starred Kartal Tibet as Tarkan.
- IDW Teenage Mutant Ninja Turtles, Arnold Casey Jones Sr. who formed the Purple Dragon gang was nicknamed Attila the Hun or just Hun.

== Toys ==
- In June 2004, McFarlane Toys released action figure of Attila, series of "McFarlane's Monsters III: 6 Faces of Madness" and recommended for mature collectors.

== Games ==
- In Age of Empires II: The Conquerors expansion, Attila the Hun is a campaign hero.
- In the game The Dig (LucasArts) the asteroid is named Attila after the leader of the Huns.
- Attila is the general leading the Hunnic Army on Rome Total War: Barbarian Invasion on one of the Historical Battles, the Battle of Châlons.
- Attila appears in Dante's Inferno in the Seventh circle of Hell, Violence, where he can be punished or absolved by Dante Alighieri.
- In Civilization V: Gods & Kings, Attila appears as Leader of the Huns.
- In Total War: Attila, Attila is the leader of the Hunnic faction and the main focal point of the game.
- In the mobile game Fate/Grand Order, Attila is manifested as a female Saber-class Servant.
- In the game Fate/Extella: The Umbral Star, Attila appears as one of the primary antagonists to the player.
- Attila is a playable character in the Mobile/PC Game Rise of Kingdoms.

== Politics ==
- Senator Kelly Loeffler described herself as being "more conservative than Attila the Hun" during her campaign for the 2020–21 United States Senate special election in Georgia.
