= Hunor and Magor =

Mythical ancestors of the Huns and the Magyars

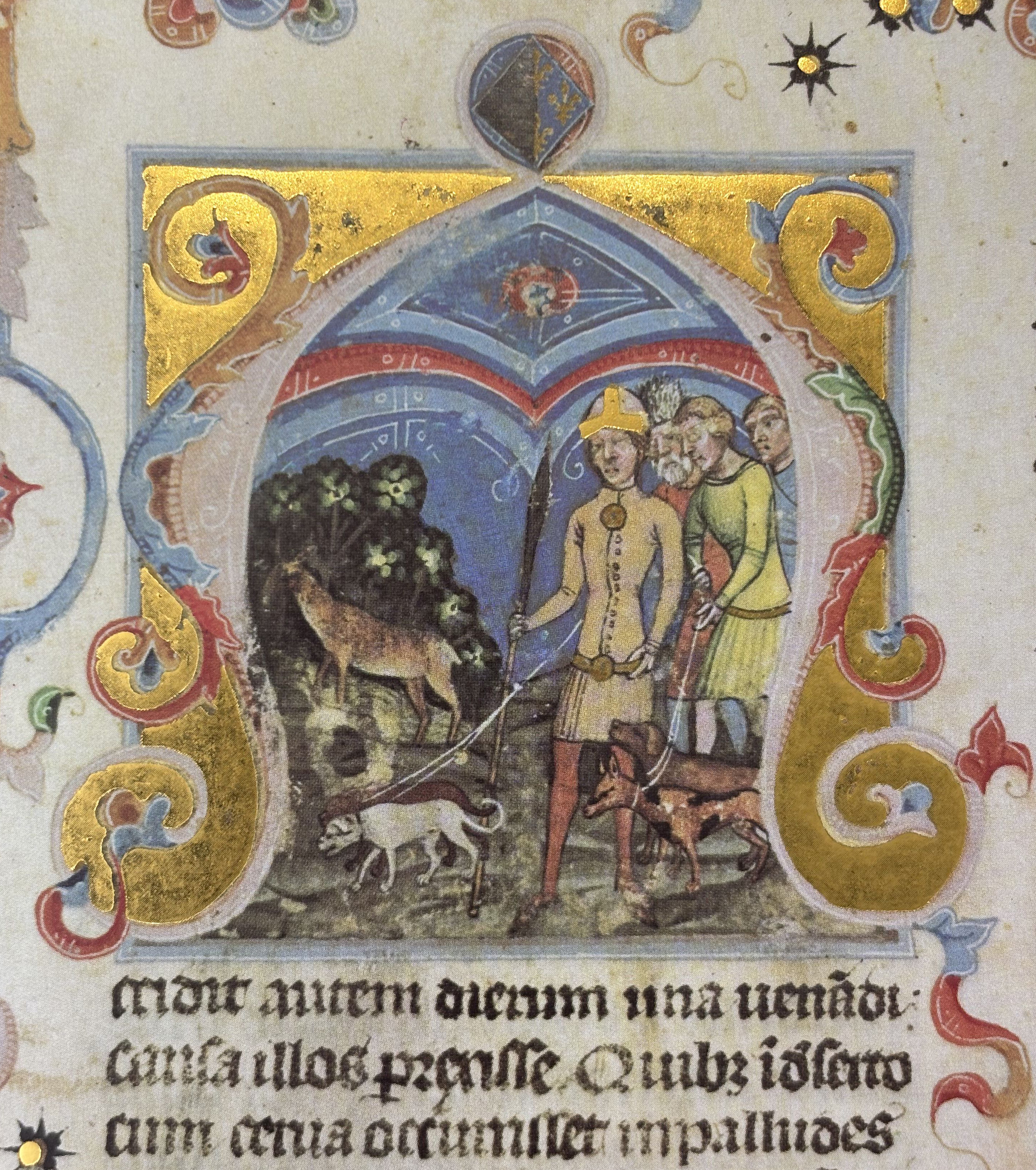
The hunt of the White Stag, from the Chronicon Pictum, 1360.

Hunor and Magor were, according to Hungarian legend, the ancestors of the Huns and the Magyars. The legend was first promoted in Gesta Hunnorum et Hungarorum. The legend's aim in providing a common ancestry for the Huns and the Magyars was to suggest historical continuum of the Kingdom of Hungary with the Hun Empire. Magyars led by prince Árpád had conquered the area in the 890s. The territory had previously been held by Attila the Hun in the 5th century. The legend thus tried to prove that the Magyars were simply reclaiming their ancient homeland as descendants of Attila. According to Simon of Kéza, Hunor and Magor were the sons of Nimrod, a mythical giant, who he partly identified with Nimrod of the Bible (the great-grandson of Noah).

== The myth ==
The brothers Hunor and Magor were the legendary forefathers of the Huns and the Hungarians, or Magyars, according to most Hungarian chronicles. Simon of Kéza's Gesta Hunnorum et Hungarorum, written in the 1280s, contains the first version of their legend. Other Hungarian chronicles wrote that the brothers were the sons either of Nimrod or of Magog, king of the Scythians. Their mother was Nimrod's wife, Eneth, whose name was derived from the Hungarian word for hind (old eneγ, now ünő), according to Simon of Kéza. Historians Zoltán Kordé and Gyula Kristó say that her name shows, the Hungarians once regarded a hind as their totemistic ancestor, but this pagan concept was reinterpreted after their conversion to Christianity since the 11th century.

The Chronicon Pictum makes Hunor and Magor the two sons of Japheth, which was the son of Noah in the Book of Genesis. Hunor and Magor, hunters like their father, were on a hunting trip when they saw their descendants multiplied and populated the nearby lands, founding the 108 clans of the Scythian nation. From them descended Attila the Hun and High Prince Álmos, the father of Árpád.

After the confusion of tongues the giant [Nimrod] entered the land of Havilah, which is now called Persia, and there he begot two sons, Hunor and Mogor, by his wife Eneth. It was from them that the Huns, or Hungarians, took their origins. However, it seems the giant Nimrod had other wives apart from Eneth, on whom he sired many sons and daughters besides Hunor and Magor. These sons and their posterity inhabit the land of Persia and resemble the Huns in stature and colour, merely differing a little in speech like the Saxons and the Thuringians. But as Hunor and Mogor were Nimrod's first born, they journeyed separately from their father in tents. Now it happened one day when they had gone out hunting in the Meotis marshes that they encountered a hind in the wilderness. As they went in pursuit of it, it fled before them. Then it disappeared from their sight altogether, and they could not find it no matter how long they searched. But as they were wandering through these marshes, they saw that the land was well suited for grazing cattle. They then returned to their father, and after obtaining his permission they took all their possessions and went to live in the Meotis marshes.... So they entered the Meotis marshes and remained there for five years without leaving. Then in the sixth year they went out, and when by chance they discovered that the wives and children of the sons of Belar were camped in tents in a lonely place without their menfolk, they carried them off with all their belongings as fast as they could into the Meotis marshes. Two daughters of Dula, prince of the Alans, happened to be among the children who were seized. Hunor took one of them in marriage and Mogor the other, and to these women all the Huns owe their origin.

— Simon of Kéza: Gesta Hunnorum et Hungarorum

== Influence ==
=== Political ===
The myth was also employed by later writers, most notably chief Justice and jurisconsult István Werbőczy, who used it to extol the Hungarian nobility in his highly influential collection of Hungarian customary law, the Tripartitum (completed 1514, first published 1517). According to Werbőczy, the Hungarians, as descendants of Hunor and Magor, were of 'Scythian' origin and subject to 'Scythian' law. "The Hungarians inherited their moral values and customs from the 'Scythians', who had once defeated even Darius and Alexander the Great. Their true vocation was war, which was the only activity that was noble enough to suit them." The nobles were free and equal; the peasants were the descendants of those who had been condemned for cowardice in battle and whose punishment had been commuted from execution to losing their social rank. Werbőczy thus used the Hunor and Magor myth to justify Hungarian serfdom. Werbőczy's ideas were eagerly adopted by the Hungarian nobility and became the charter of common law for three centuries.

The poorer smaller nobles (the gentry) particularly cherished their 'Scythian' identity. According to Engel:

It made the nobility inclined to think in terms of historical fictions and to cherish illusions. They thought that they had the right to rule their subjects without having to meet any obligations. It also involved an extreme respect for traditions, and gave birth to what was an early form of 'nationalism'. The nobility's ideology overvalued everything that was, or was thought to be, ancient, and regarded everything that seemed strange or unusual with aversion or even hostility [....] The nobility also took delight in hearing about 'Scythian' values, for they imagined they recognised their own virtues in them. Among the petty nobility the ideal of martial simplicity must have become especially popular, for it made a virtue out of their misery and illiteracy."

=== Literary ===
János Arany retold the myth in his poem Rege a csodaszarvasról (Legend of the Miraculous Stag) as did Kate Seredy in her children's book The White Stag.

== See also ==
- Gog and Magog
- Gothicismus (the belief that the Swedes were descended from the Goths)
- Hengest and Horsa
- Lech, Czech and Rus
- Romulus and Remus
- Sarmatism (the belief that the Polish nobility were of Sarmatian descent)

== Sources ==
=== Primary sources ===
- Simon of Kéza: The Deeds of the Hungarians (Edited and translated by László Veszprémy and Frank Schaer with a study by Jenő Szűcs) (1999). CEU Press. ISBN 963-9116-31-9.

=== Secondary sources ===
- Engel, Pál (2001). The Realm of St Stephen: A History of Medieval Hungary, 895–1526. I.B. Tauris Publishers. ISBN 1-86064-061-3.
- Kordé, Zoltán (1994). "Eneth, Hunor és Magyar; Menroth". In Kristó, Gyula; Engel, Pál; Makk, Ferenc (eds.). Korai magyar történeti lexikon (9–14. század) [Encyclopedia of the Early Hungarian History (9th–14th centuries)] (in Hungarian). Akadémiai Kiadó. pp. 187–188, 275, 451–452. ISBN 963-05-6722-9.
- Kristó, Gyula (1996). Hungarian History in the Ninth Century. Szegedi Középkorász Muhely. ISBN 963-482-113-8.
- Molnár, Miklós (2001). A Concise History of Hungary. Cambridge University Press. ISBN 978-0-521-66736-4.
- Spinei, Victor (2003). The Great Migrations in the East and South East of Europe from the Ninth to the Thirteenth Century (Translated by Dana Badulescu). Romanian Cultural Institute. ISBN 973-85894-5-2.
