= The Primrose Ring (film) =

1917 American film directed by Robert Zigler Leonard

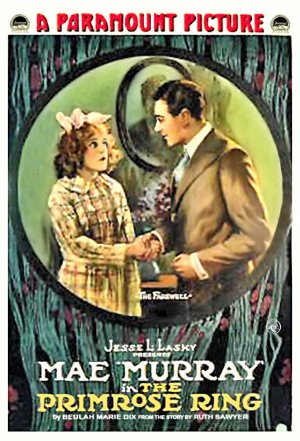
- Theatrical release poster
- Directed by: Robert Z. Leonard
- Screenplay by: Marion Fairfax; Ruth Sawyer
- Based on: The Primrose Ring by Ruth Sawyer
- Produced by: Jesse L. Lasky
- Starring: Mae Murray; Tom Moore; Winter Hall; Billy Jacobs; Mayme Kelso; Loretta Young
- Cinematography: Charles Rosher
- Production company: Jesse L. Lasky Feature Play Company
- Distributed by: Paramount Pictures
- Release date: May 7, 1917
- Running time: 50 minutes
- Country: United States
- Language: Silent (English intertitles)

The Primrose Ring is a lost 1917 American silent drama film directed by Robert Z. Leonard and written by Marion Fairfax and Ruth Sawyer. The film stars Mae Murray, Tom Moore, Winter Hall, Paul Jacobs (credited as "Billy Jacobs"), Mayme Kelso, and Loretta Young. It is based on the 1915 novel of the same name by Sawyer. The film was released on May 7, 1917, by Paramount Pictures.

== Cast ==
- Mae Murray as Margaret MacLean
- Tom Moore as Bob MacLean
- Winter Hall as Dr. Ralph MacLean
- Paul Jacobs as Sandy (credited as "Billy Jacobs")
- Mayme Kelso as Miss Foote
- Loretta Young as Fairy

== Preservation ==
With no prints of The Primrose Ring located in any film archives, it is a lost film.
