= The Christmas Anna Angel =

1944 Picture book

- First edition
- Author: Ruth Sawyer
- Illustrator: Kate Seredy
- Publisher: Viking Press
- Publication date: 1944
- Pages: unpaged
- Awards: Caldecott Honor

The Christmas Anna Angel is a 1944 picture book by Ruth Sawyer and illustrated by Kate Seredy. Although written and published during World War II, the story takes place in Hungary during World War I as a girl Anna hopes for a Christmas miracle. Seredy was the perfect choice to illustrate a story set in rural Hungary during World War I, full of local costumes and traditions. The story begins, realistically, with a farming family. Just as realistically, ruthless soldiers search the farm for flour, and take the year’s harvest. Happily, young Anna’s faith in a personal angel, her own Anna Angel, is rewarded by a dream-like Christmas Eve making and baking of the special Christmas cake – just in time for Christmas Day. Fortunately, Anna’s little dog is able to talk, and helps her, too.

The book was a recipient of a 1945 Caldecott Honor for Kate Seredy's illustrations.
