= The Primrose Ring =

1915 novel by Ruth Sawyer

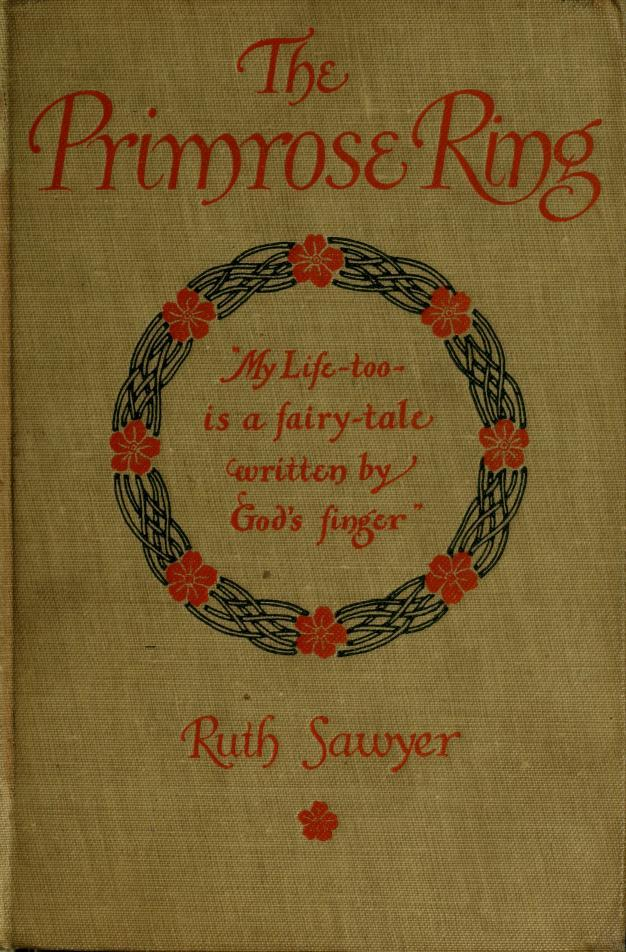
- Author: Ruth Sawyer
- Language: English
- Genre: Novel
- Publisher: Grosset & Dunlap
- Publication date: 1915
- Publication place: United States
- Media type: Print (Hardback & Paperback)
- Pages: N/A
- OCLC: 4354835

The Primrose Ring is a novel by Ruth Sawyer, published first in 1915 and illustrated by Fanny Munsell. This was Sawyer's first published novel. She later wrote the 1937 Newbery Medal winner Roller Skates.

== Film adaptation ==
The novel was adapted into a silent film in 1917 by Paramount Pictures. The film version starring Mae Murray and an uncredited Loretta Young (in her film debut as a Fairy), and was directed by Robert Z. Leonard.
