= The Singing Tree =

1939 novel by Kate Seredy

- First edition cover
- Author: Kate Seredy
- Illustrator: Kate Seredy
- Language: English
- Genre: Children's novel
- Publisher: Viking Books
- Publication date: 1939
- Publication place: United States
- Media type: Print (Hardcover)
- Pages: 247 pp
- ISBN: 0-670-64700-4
- Preceded by: The Good Master

The Singing Tree is a children's novel by Kate Seredy, the sequel to The Good Master. Also illustrated by Seredy, it was a Newbery Honor book in 1940. Set in rural Hungary four years after The Good Master, it continues the story of Kate and Jancsi, showing the effect of World War I on the people and land.

== Plot summary ==
It is 1914, and two years have passed since the events of The Good Master. Jancsi Nagy, now called the "Young Master", is becoming a fine horseman and his father, Kate's Uncle Márton, has given him his own herd. Kate's father has moved from Budapest to the nearby village to teach school, and even wild Kate is growing up and taking on responsibilities on the farm, taking charge of the chickens and helping her Aunt with the sewing and ironing. As wonderful as things are, change is coming. Kate loves the idea of growing up until she learns it means she will have to stop riding her beloved horse. Spoiled Lily is coming to spend the summer with the Nagy family. And trouble is brewing in Hungary. For almost two hundred years it has had an alliance with Austria, and its men have served three years in the army under Austrian command. But the old loyalties are becoming strained, and resentments build between Austrian, Magyar and Slav. Coming home from a traditional Hungarian wedding the tired Nagys hear that Francis Ferdinand has been assassinated. Soon all the men between twenty-two and thirty are ordered to report for duty, and the little town has its first war casualty, young Rabbi Joseph Mandelbaum. As Uncle Marton explains "War is like a stampede, Jancsi. A small thing can start it and suddenly the very earth is shaking with fury and people turn into wild things, crushing everything beautiful and sweet, destroying homes, lives, blindly in their mad rush from nowhere to nowhere."

Everything changes in Hungary during the war, and on the farm. Kate's father is a prisoner in Russia and Uncle Márton goes off to war, leaving Jancsi in charge. Every night the family gathers in the kitchen to read and reread the news from their loved ones. Only a few old men and children are left to help with the farm work, so Jansci requisitions six Russian prisoners of war to help. Fortunately, "Uncle" Moses Mandelbaum speaks Russian, and Jancsi leans on him for help, as do all the other villagers left behind. Soon the Russians are at home on the farm, growing fat from Mother's cooking, caring for the sheep, horses, and each other. Then news stops coming from Uncle Marton. As months go by without word, they stay busy with work try to pretend they aren't worried. When a letter comes from Auntie's parents, Jancsi, Kate and Lily travel for two days to get them and take them to the farm. A chance stop at a hospital on the way home has the girls visiting the patients, including one amnesiac suffering from shell shock. He turns out to be Uncle Marton, who is sent home to recover. Fifteen-year-old Jancsi can relax and enjoy himself now that his father is home again, and they all desperately hope the war will be over before he has to go back. Finally the doctors decide even brave Uncle Márton's mind can only take so much horror, and they tell the family they will not be sending him back to the fighting.

News comes to the farm that England and France have blockaded Germany, and German children are starving. The Hungarian government asks people to volunteer to take as many children as they can in, feed them, and care for them until the war ends. The Nagys take six. The fourth Christmas of the war there are twenty people in the house, Hungarian, German and Russian, eating, exchanging presents and telling stories. That spring Uncle Márton tells them the about the singing tree—an apple tree the men spotted one morning when all around them was barren and dead. It sang because it was alive with birds, all kinds of birds, that had sheltered in it during the night. "Perhaps they... were merely passing time until it would be safe to travel" he told them, but the tree would stay, "she, mother of all, she would remain the same." Finally, in fall of 1918, the war ends and men began returning home. "Uncle" Moses' only living son comes home to be a shop keeper like his father, the Russians prisoners and German children go home, Kate's father is coming back to the farm and everyone hopes the world has learned how to live at peace at last.

== Critical reception ==
The Singing Tree was well received when it came out. Horn Book Magazine included it on its Fanfare list of the best books of 1939. Kirkus Reviews gave it a starred review for "books of remarkable merit", saying it "might well be a candidate for the Nobel Prize for Peace. It has all the charm in text and pictures of its predecessor, The Good Master, and more mature technique. Story movingly told, skillfully interweaving incident and idea." In 1940 The Singing Tree was named a Newbery Honor book.

More recently, children's literature expert Anita Silvey singled out the book's "strong and moving narrative". A review in the Fresno Literature Examiner is more qualified in its praise. "The Singing Tree, like The Good Master, is a memorable tale for children to learn from by evoking powerful ideas of love and friendship through its text... However, Seredy’s display of political correctness somehow hurts the novel’s content".

== Themes ==
Seredy was not afraid to tackle social issues in her books. She suffered physically and emotionally from the effects of nursing on the front during World War I, and she drew on her experience in several of her books, including the Singing Tree. It appeared in 1939, at the beginning of World War II, but Seredy did not write a patriotic story. Instead, war and the damage it does to people and the land is her theme. While the farm becomes a place of refuge for people from both sides of the conflict, leaving it to join the fighting almost destroys Uncle Marton. Seredy did not confine her story to showing only the problems of war for one side. According to Ann Bartholomew in Twentieth-Century Children's Writers Seredy was "one of the first children's writers to have dealt with the problems of the alien" during war times.
