= The White Stag =

1937 children's book by Kate Seredy

- Author: Kate Seredy
- Illustrator: Kate Seredy
- Language: English
- Genre: Children's historical fantasy
- Publisher: Viking Press
- Publication date: 1937
- Publication place: United States
- Media type: Hardback
- Pages: 94 pp
- ISBN: 0-14-031258-7

The White Stag is a children's book, written and illustrated by Kate Seredy. It won the Newbery Medal for excellence in American children's literature and received the Lewis Carroll Shelf Award. The White Stag is a mythical retelling that follows the warrior bands of Huns and Magyars across Asia and into Europe, including the life of Attila the Hun.

== Plot synopsis ==
The White Stag opens after the fall of the Biblical Tower of Babel. Nimrod is waiting for his two sons, Hunor and Magyar, to return. They rode away after a mysterious white stag that appeared seven months ago. Afraid they will never return and his people will be left leaderless, the old man offers a sacrifice to their god, Hadur—his war horse. Immediately his sons return with meat for the hungry people. As they tell the story of their chase of the white stag, Nimrod realizes it is now time for them to take over leading their people, and he throws himself on the altar.

Now Hunor and Magyar lead the people in a search for their promised land, following the white stag they can never catch. Later they meet and marry the Moonmaidens, and live contentedly for fifteen years. Eventually the game deserts them, and the people move on. "Like a sharp wedge they had driven themselves into Europe and now they were surrounded by enemies; they had to go on or perish." This time they have to fight many groups who live in the lands they travel through, and the people begin to quarrel. Hunor is strong and hard, while Magyar is quieter and more learned. Though both brothers still lead, the people are becoming divided and now identify themselves as Huns or Magyars, depending on which brother they most respect. Magyar wants to find a less populated land, but Hunor leads them into more fighting.

Finally the two groups split. The Magyars stay behind and Hunor's son, Bendeguz, and grandson, Atilla, lead the Huns west. When they find themselves at a dead-end during a blinding snow storm, the White Stag appears to show them a path through the mountains to their promised land, modern-day Hungary.

== Background ==
Kate Seredy was born in Hungary and came to the United States at the age of twenty-three. She had previously published two children's books here. Her first, The Good Master, was based in her homeland, and received the Newbery Honor award. Her second book, "Listening", was set in rural New York where she lived in at the time. Hungary again became the inspiration for The White Stag. Originally conceived after Seredy read a book on Hungarian history for children and found it dry, she says in the foreword that she wrote the book for "Those who want to hear the voice of pagan gods in wind and thunder, who want to see fairies dance in the moonlight, who can believe that faith can move mountains, can follow the thread on the pages of this book. It is a fragile thread; it cannot bear the weight of facts and dates." Based on her father's favorite folktale about the founding of that country, The White Stag was written in just three weeks.

== Critical reception ==
Kirkus Reviews gave The White Stag a starred review "for books of remarkable merit", saying, "Kate Seredy has a magic sense of story, a manner of telling that seems instinctive of the content, and her illustrations are perfect interpretation of the text." According to the Fresno Literature Examiner, Seredy "had a significant impact on children's literature". It went on to call the book "A beautiful collection of mystical black-and-white illustrations and handcrafted fantasy… The White Stag is a poignant combination of myths, history, and legends." In 1959 The White Stag received the Lewis Carroll Shelf Award.

Despite the fact that The White Stag was a Newbery Medal winner and The Good Master was named an Honor book, a number of reviewers consider The Good Master to be Seredy's best book, preferring it over The White Stag. Reviewer Anita Silvey explains this by saying "Powerful, poetic prose and stunning illustrations combine to make (The Good Master) one of Seredy's best, although it lacks the child appeal of her other work."

== See also ==
- The white stag in Hungarian mythology - Csodaszarvas

Awards
Preceded by Roller Skates	Newbery Medal recipient 1938	Succeeded by Thimble Summer
