= The Wonderful Year (novel) =

1946 children's novel by Nancy Barnes

- First edition cover
- Author: Nancy Barnes
- Illustrator: Kate Seredy
- Language: English
- Genre: Children's literature
- Publisher: Messner
- Publication date: 1946
- Publication place: United States

The Wonderful Year is a 1946 children's novel written by Nancy Barnes (Helen Simmons Adams) and illustrated by Kate Seredy. It describes a year in the life of the Martin family, including 11-year-old Ellen, who move from Kansas to a fruit ranch in Colorado. The book earned a Julia Ellsworth Ford Foundation Prize in 1945 and a Newbery Honor in 1947.
