= Young Walter Scott =

1935 children's biography of Walter Scott by Elizabeth Janet Gray

- First edition
- Author: Elizabeth Janet Gray
- Language: English
- Genre: Children's literature / Biography
- Publisher: Viking
- Publication date: 1934
- Publication place: United States

Young Walter Scott is a 1935 children's fictionalized biography of Walter Scott written by Elizabeth Janet Gray and illustrated by Kate Seredy. Set in Edinburgh, Scotland, in the late eighteenth century, it covers Scott's childhood from the age of 10 to 17. It was a Newbery Honor recipient in 1936.

== Reception ==
An early criticism noted that "Young or old, Walter Scott would have had some difficulty in recognizing himself or his environment in this softly tinted artificial light". Kirkus Reviews described it as "A vigorous picture of boyhood against odds..."
