= Roller Skates =

1936 children's book by Ruth Sawyer

- Author: Ruth Sawyer
- Illustrator: Valenti Angelo
- Language: English
- Genre: Children's realistic fiction
- Publisher: Viking Press
- Publication date: October 1936
- Publication place: United States
- Media type: Print hardback
- Pages: 186 pp
- ISBN: 978-0670603107

Roller Skates is a book by Ruth Sawyer that won the Newbery Medal for excellence in American children's literature in 1937. It is a fictionalized account of one year of Sawyer's life.

== Plot summary ==
Roller Skates opens with the narrator remembering a special year in the 1890s, when young Lucinda Wyman arrives at the Misses Peters' home in New York City, where the two ladies cared for her during the year of Lucinda's parents' trip to Italy. The narrator's diaries help her remember the details of 10-year-old Lucinda's "orphanage," as she calls it. Miss Peters, a teacher, is "a person of great understanding, no nonsense, and no interference." Miss Nettie is shy and soft-hearted. Living with them Lucinda experiences unprecedented freedom, exploring the city on roller skates and making friends with all types of people.

Lucinda quickly gets to know Mr. Gilligan the hansom cab driver and Patrolman M'Gonegal. The first friend of her own age is Tony Coppino, son of an Italian fruit stand owner. Lucinda enlists Officer M'Gonegal to stop the bullies who knock down Tony's father's fruit stand and steal the fruit. In return Tony takes her for a city picnic where they meet a rag-and-bone man. Later Lucinda reads Shakespeare with her favorite uncle and is inspired to put on a puppet production of The Tempest.

But the cold and snow of winter keep her cooped up indoors, and eventually a restless Lucinda acts out and gets sent home from school in disgrace. Later her uncle introduces her to Shakespeare's tragedies, and she experiences her own when two of her friends die. With Lucinda's parents coming back from Italy, she realizes everything is changing, so she skates to the park one last time. "How would you like to stay always ten?" she muses. "That's what I'd call a perfectly elegant idea!"

== Background ==
Sawyer's family was well-to-do, and she was raised by older parents who insisted she adhere to strict rules and routines. When she was ten they traveled to Europe for the summer, leaving her with her Irish nanny and the extended family. For the first time she was allowed the freedom she longed for to explore New York City. As she said in her Newbery acceptance speech, "A free child is a happy child; and there is nothing more lovely; even a disagreeable child ceases to be disagreeable and is liked". Sawyer drew on her experiences that year when she wrote Roller Skates.

== Critical reception ==
Roller Skates dealt with issues that were unusual for the times, including the death of two of Lucinda's friends. According to the Dictionary of Literary Biography, "juvenile literature at this time generally did not contain some of the events and behavior which occurred as natural processes in Lucinda's experiences." These experiences include "her lack of 'proper' supervision, her strange assortment of friends, and her encounter with death". Critical reaction to the book was positive. Kirkus Reviews gave it a starred review "for books of remarkable merit". Roller Skates received the Newbery Medal for 1937 for "the most distinguished contribution to American literature for children".

Awards
Preceded by Caddie Woodlawn	Newbery Medal recipient 1937	Succeeded by The White Stag
