= The Good Master =

1935 novel by Kate Seredy

- Author: Kate Seredy
- Illustrator: Kate Seredy
- Language: English
- Genre: Children's novel
- Publisher: Viking Books
- Publication date: 1935
- Publication place: United States
- Media type: Print (Hardcover)
- Followed by: The Singing Tree

The Good Master (1935) is a children's novel written and illustrated by Kate Seredy. It was named a Newbery Honor book in 1936. The Good Master is set in the Hungarian countryside before World War I and tells the story of wild young Kate, who goes to live with her Uncle's family when her father can't control her and at the end she goes back to her father. At Uncle Marton's suggestion, Kate and her father move back to the country to live, to be near Marton and his wife and son. Like his brother Marton, Kate's father Sandor is a countryman and misses rural life. And he sees what a wonderful effect country life has had on Kate.

== Plot summary ==
"'My cousin Kate from Budapest is coming to live with us. She's delicate and has had the measles!' shouted Jancsi to a friend as he and his father were driving to the station to meet her. Jancsi had imagined Kate as a sort of fragile, fair-haired princess, but the little girl who stepped off the train had plain black hair, a smudgy face, and skinny legs. From the moment Kate arrived, things happened. She was afraid of nothing and full of ideas. When Kate looked almost angelic, you could be sure she was thinking up some mischief."

Young Kate isn't at all what Jancsi and his family are expecting. She turns out to be an out-of-control little girl, sent by her father to live with her Uncle's family in the country. Kate's Uncle Marton is the "Good Master", a kind and respected man in the community. Her father has spoiled Kate since her mother died, and now he hopes his brother will be able to do something with her.

At first, Jancsi is repelled by her unpredictable and disrespectful behavior. But he and Kate share many adventures on his father's ranch in Hungary—riding run-away horses, going to a Country Fair, celebrating Easter and Christmas in traditional ways. Eventually, he learns to appreciate her spirit, and Kate learns to love and respect the people she has met. When her father arrives at the end of the book, he hardly recognizes his polite, self-controlled daughter, and she persuades him to move to the country to teach.

== Background ==
The Good Master was written after May Massee, children's editor for Viking Press, suggested that illustrator Kate Seredy should write a story about her childhood in Hungary. The events in the book are based on summers Seredy spent with her father on the rural plains while he studied peasant life. The book evokes the folk customs and way of life of old Hungary.

The Singing Tree, also a Newbery Honor book, is a sequel to The Good Master and describes the changes brought by World War I to the people and countryside.

== Themes ==
The superiority of country life over urban is a theme in The Good Master. Kate, a child of the city, is peevish and unhappy. Coming to the country, interacting with the animals and people who live and work on the land becomes her cure. The shepherd Kate meets while traveling with her Uncle spells Seredy's idea out. "The sky gives me sunshine and rain. The ground gives me food and water. The sheep gives me clothing and my bed... Can money and schools give me more?" This is a theme Seredy returns to in many of her books.

== Reception ==
Reviewer Anita Silvey calls The Good Master a "warm, appealing story". According to her "both children are well-realized characters in a book that contains, humor, adventure, and a vivid sense of rural Hungarian life." Children's literature expert May Hill Arbuthnot says that the book "was an instantaneous favorite with children... Hungarian festivals and legends... the work of the ranch... and the warm family life add color and charm to a delightful story." Kirkus Reviews gave the book a starred review for "books of remarkable merit", citing "the charm of the vigorous, dramatic, colorful background" and praising Seredy, noting "her exquisite illustrations carry the feel of the country of which she writes. One of the outstanding books this fall."

The Good Master was a Newbery Honor book. It was also named a Junior Literary Guild selection, having been chosen by the editorial board consisting of Helen Ferris, Angelo Patri, Eleanor Roosevelt, and Mrs. Sidonie Gruenberg as an outstanding publication of the month for younger readers. It appears among the Top 100 books of the twentieth century for younger readers chosen by the State Library of Tasmania.

Surprisingly, Seredy seems to be unknown (and untranslated) in her native Hungary, despite the fact that her story of the Good Master, and the sequel set in World War I are intensely about Hungary.
