= Christopher Hart (novelist) =

English novelist and journalist

- Born: 1965 (age 60–61)
- Writing career
- Pen name: William Napier
- Period: 1999–present
- Genres: Contemporary, Historical fiction

Christopher William Napier Hart (born 1965) is an English novelist and journalist. He writes for the Sunday Times, where he was chief theatre critic 2007-2019, the Daily Mail and The Literary Review. He is the author of The Harvest (1999), Rescue Me (2001), and Lost Children (2018), and has written seven historical novels under his two middle names, William Napier. His books have been translated into over twenty languages worldwide.

== Bibliography ==
=== As Christopher Hart ===
- The Harvest (1999)
- Rescue Me (2001)
- Lost Children (2018)

=== As William Napier ===
- Julia: An Epic Tale of Love And War Set in the Final Days of the Roman Empire (2001)
- Attila (Attila: The Scourge of God) (2005)
- Attila: The Gathering of the Storm (2007)
- Attila: The Judgement (2008)
- Clash of Empires: The Great Siege (2011) ISBN 1409105342; ISBN 9781409105343
- Clash of Empires: The Red Sea (5 July 2012)
- The Last Crusaders: Ivan the Terrible (2014) ISBN 1409105377
