= Rise of Kingdoms =

- Developer: Lilith Games
- Publisher: Lilith Games
- Platforms: iOS, Android, Windows, macOS
- Release: iOS and Android; May 24, 2018; Windows and macOS; April 6, 2022
- Genre: Real-time strategy
- Modes: Online multiplayer, Single player campaign

Rise of Kingdoms: Lost Crusade, formerly known as Rise of Civilisations and commonly shortened to Rise of Kingdoms or ROK, is a 2018 free-to-play real-time strategy mobile game released by Chinese game developer Lilith. In Rise of Kingdoms, players choose between a variety of real-world historical civilisations, each of which has its own strategic advantages. The game's gameplay includes building and expanding your kingdom, unlocking new technologies, recruiting various commanders, gathering resources, forming alliances with other players, and real-time turn-based combat.

As of December 2023, Lilith announced that Rise of Kingdoms has 100 million players. Lilith does not distinguish between "players" and "characters", therefore this number does not necessarily mean that Rise of Kingdoms has been downloaded 100 million times.

Rise of Kingdoms has become known for its extensive online marketing campaigns; these come in many different forms. Some are fully animated, while others show staged social interactions between real people. These adverts have been satirised for their strange and funny nature.

== Development, release and marketing ==
On 5 March 2019, Rise of Civilisations changed its name to 'Rise of Kingdoms'. According to Lilith's official community announcement, the name change was done due to copyright restrictions in some countries: they wanted 'a unifying, global experience for all players'.

=== Advertising ===
Rise of Kingdoms has become known for its notable use of marketing campaigns and advertisements, which have been described as 'bizarre'. One common format of such ads involves a social situation, which results in the person with the most in-game 'power' impressing the others and gaining increased social status. Sometimes then being followed with an explanation on how they had gotten so much 'power' which often includes describing the benefits of a civilization they picked. This is also used in animated adverts, which usually feature an in-game character with low power gaining it through conquering their enemies.

== Civilizations ==
The game features several civilisations, each of which have a starting commander and military unit, which are taken from their respective cultures and based on real-world history. The game includes many historical references - for example, upon reaching the 'Bronze Age' in game, the celebration screen displays artefacts from Sanxingdui, a major Bronze Age archaeological site located near Chengdu.

List of civilisations in Rise of Kingdoms:
| Civilization | Commander | Special Unit | Unit Type |
|---|---|---|---|
| China | Sun Tzu | Chu-Ko-Nu | Archer |
| Greece | Pericles | Argyraspide | Infantry |
| Rome | Scipio Africanus | Legionary | Infantry |
| Germany | Hermann | Teutonic Knight | Cavalry |
| Britain | Boudica | Longbowman | Archer |
| Vikings | Björn Ironside | Berserker | Infantry |
| Egypt | Imhotep | Maryannu | Archer |
| France | Joan of Arc | Throwing Axeman | Infantry |
| Byzantium | Belisarius | Cataphract | Cavalry |
| Ottoman Empire | Osman I | Janissary | Archer |
| Arabia | Baibars | Mamluk | Cavalry |
| Spain | Pelagius | Conquistador | Cavalry |
| Korea | Eulji Mundeok | Hwarang | Archer |
| Japan | Kusunoki Masashige | Samurai | Infantry |
| Maya | Wak Chanil Ajaw | Spear Thrower | Archer |

== Reception ==
=== Commercial reception ===
Rise of Kingdoms has grossed over $3.5bn in total revenue, and has over 50 million downloads on the Google Play Store.

=== Critical reception ===
Rise of Kingdoms has been praised for its scope and gameplay depth, with Luciano of Touch, Tap, Play describing the game as 'ambitious' and comparing it favourably to other mobile strategy games, which he describes as 'stripped back versions of their PC and console counterparts'. He praises Rise of Kingdoms's 'incredibly dynamic...gameplay', as well as its being 'playable in five-minute bursts if necessary'.

Nick Rowe of TechNuovo gave a generally positive review. He said that '[he] really enjoy[s] the game' and said 'it's [been] receiving ALOT[sic] of praise, and rightly so, it's a fun game.' He praised the commander system, calling it 'a nice addition'. He warned against spending money on the game, however, saying he 'dread[s] to think what some have spent getting to these crazy power levels.'

Jason Parker of MMOHuts, however, gave the game a 2 out of 5, calling the monetisation 'greedy for the sake of greed'. He notes that the VIP system is 'convoluted' and concludes that 'if you want to dominate your foes, I cannot see a way to do it without spending tons of time or serious cash.' He also disliked the battle system, stating that 'PVP isn't about tactics, just raw power.'

Jason Bennett of the Arkansas Democrat Gazette gave the game a 4/10, praising the game's 'addictive' nature and its 'interesting gameplay mechanics', but disliking its 'pay-to-win' model. He states that '[i]f you want to be the strongest governor, all it really takes is a credit card with a high limit' and complains of '[p]layers [being] bombarded by advertisements to buy more gems'. He also criticised the game's story, saying 'there's no real narrative to speak of' and 'no victory condition to the cycle of endless conflict'.
