= Kate Seredy =

American writer

- Born: November 10, 1899 (Note: Sources report various birth dates for Seredy. Beside 1899 the reported years are 1896 and 1897.); Budapest, Hungary
- Died: March 7, 1975 (aged 75); Middletown, New York
- Occupations: Writer, illustrator
- Writing career
- Language: English
- Notable works: (Text and illustrations); The Good Master; The White Stag; The Singing Tree
- Notable awards: Newbery Medal; 1938

Kate Seredy (November 10, 1899 – March 7, 1975) was an American writer and illustrator of children's books. She won the Newbery Medal once, the Newbery Honor twice, the Caldecott Honor once, and the Lewis Carroll Shelf Award. Most of her books were written in English, which was not her first language.

== Life ==
Kate Seredy was born on November 10, 1899 in Budapest, Hungary. She was the only child of a schoolteacher, Louis Peter Seredy, and his wife, Anna Ireny. Seredy received a diploma to teach art from the Academy of Arts in Budapest. During World War I Seredy traveled to Paris and worked as a combat nurse. After the war she illustrated several books in Hungary.

In 1922 Seredy moved from Budapest to the United States. She studied English, working as an illustrator and artist to support herself, while preparing to illustrate children's books. From 1933 to 1934 Seredy owned a children's bookstore. Though the store was not a success, she later credited it with helping her understand children and what makes a good children's book. In 1935 Seredy met May Massee, the children's editor at Viking Press. Massee did not have any illustration work for Seredy, but encouraged her to write about her childhood in Hungary, promising to publish the book for Christmas. After several months of work, Seredy submitted what would become The Good Master, which she also illustrated. Though the book is not autobiographical, Seredy did spend her summers as a child on the plains of Hungary. She used many of her impressions and experiences in the story about young Kate, who is sent by her widowed father from Budapest to the country to live with her Uncle and his family. The Good Master was named a Newbery Honor book in 1935, a runner-up to Caddie Woodlawn, which Seredy illustrated for Simon and Schuster. In addition she designed the jacket and endpapers for Young Walter Scott, which was another Newbery runner-up that year.

In 1936 Seredy wrote and illustrated Listening, set in rural New Jersey. That same year she purchased, "Listening Hill", a 100-acre (40 ha) farm near Montgomery, New York. It was here that she wrote The White Stag, a historical retelling of the legends of Huns settling Hungary. Seredy learned these stories from her father when she was a child. This book, which she also illustrated, won the Newbery Award in 1938. In 1959 it received the Lewis Carroll Shelf Award.

The Singing Tree appeared in 1939. A sequel to The Good Master, it tells of the effects of World War I on Kate and all of her family. The book shows the terrible effects of war on ordinary people, especially those forced to leave their lands and homes to fight. The Singing Tree was also named a Newbery Honor book. Seredy continued to write and illustrate her own books as well as those of other writers. In 1945 she illustrated The Christmas Anna Angel by Ruth Sawyer. When the Caldecott Honor list was created in 1971, Seredy was retroactively named an Honor winner for those illustrations.

Seredy had 12 children's books published, but she considered herself an illustrator more than an author. She had a unique style, primarily based on drawing, and considered her books "an excuse for making pictures". Her last book, Lazy Tinka, is dedicated to her long-time editor, May Massee.

Later in her life Seredy moved from her farm to a house in the nearby village of Montgomery. She died on March 7, 1975, in Middletown, New York, at the age of 75. Her papers and illustrations are held at the May Massee Collection at Emporia State University, Emporia, Kansas, and the University of Oregon Library.

== Works ==
The Christmas Anna Angel (later, Caldecott Honor cover)

=== Written and illustrated ===
- The Good Master, Viking Press, 1935 ^
- Listening, Viking, 1936
- The White Stag, Viking, 1937 +
- The Singing Tree, Viking, 1939 ^
- A Tree for Peter, Viking, 1941. Reissued Purple House Press, 2004, 2014.
- The Open Gate, Viking, 1943
- The Chestry Oak, Viking, 1948. Reissued Purple House Press, 2015.
- Gypsy, Viking, 1951
- Philomena, Viking, 1955
- The Tenement Tree, Viking, 1959
- A Brand New Uncle, Viking, 1961
- Lazy Tinka, Viking, 1962

=== Selected illustrated books ===
- Friendly Stories by Arthur I. Gates and Miriam Blanton Huber, Macmillan, 1930
- The Pathfinder : Readings from Modern Literature by Lawton B. Evans, Macmillan, 1930
- God our Father by Virgil George Michel and Basil Augustine Stegmann, Macmillan, 1934
- The Prince Commands by Andre Norton (Norton's debut), D. Appleton–Century Company, 1934
- Caddie Woodlawn by Carol Ryrie Brink, Macmillan, 1935 +
- Common Sense for Mothers on Bringing up Your Children from Babyhood to Adolescence by Estelle Mulqueen Reilly, Funk & Wagnalls, 1935
- Young Walter Scott by Elizabeth Janet Gray, Viking, 1935 ^
- The Selfish Giant and Other Stories compiled by Wilhelmina Harper, David McKay, 1935
- Winterbound by Margery Bianco, Viking, 1936 ^
- Smiling Hill Farm by Miriam Evangeline Mason, Junior Literary Guild and Ginn and Co., 1937
- An Ear for Uncle Emil by E.R. Gaggin, Junior Literary Guild and Viking, 1939
- The Christmas Anna Angel by Ruth Sawyer, Viking, 1943 <
- The Wonderful Year by Nancy Barnes, Junior Literary Guild and J. Messner, 1946 ^
- Little Vic by Doris Gates, Viking, 1951
- A Dog Named Penny by Clyde Robert Bulla, Ginn, 1955

+ Newbery Award Winner
^ Newbery Honor Book
< Caldecott Honor Book

== See also ==
- Attila the Hun in popular culture
