= Ruth Sawyer =

American children's writer and storyteller (1880–1970)

- Sawyer
- Born: August 5, 1880; Boston, Massachusetts, US
- Died: June 3, 1970 (aged 89); Lexington, Massachusetts
- Education: Columbia University (B.S.)
- Occupations: Storyteller, teacher, writer
- Spouse: Albert C. Durand (m. 1911)
- Writing career
- Genre: Children's literature
- Notable works: Roller Skates; This Way To Christmas; The Way of the Storyteller
- Notable awards: Newbery Medal; 1937; Children's Literature Legacy Award; 1965

Ruth Sawyer (August 5, 1880 – June 3, 1970) was an American storyteller and a writer of fiction and non-fiction for children and adults. She is best known as the author of Roller Skates, which won the 1937 Newbery Medal. She received the Children's Literature Legacy Award in 1965 for her lifetime achievement in children's literature.

== Life ==
Sawyer was born on August 5, 1880, in Boston, Massachusetts. She was the youngest of five children, was the only daughter of Francis Milton and Ethalinda Smith Sawyer. While she was still a baby they moved to New York City, where she attended private school. The product of a wealthy family, Sawyer had an Irish nanny named Joanna, who inspired her love and appreciation of storytelling. Upon the death of her father, a New York City importer, the family moved to their summer cottage in Maine. There they lived off the land, an experience that Sawyer later described in her novel, The Year of Jubilo. Eventually the family returned to New York and Sawyer attended the Garland Kindergarten Training School for two years.

In 1900, Sawyer left Garland and traveled to Cuba. There she taught storytelling to teachers who were opening kindergartens for children orphaned during the Spanish–American War. After returning to the United States, her work in Cuba helped her obtain a scholarship to Columbia University where she studied storytelling and folk lore. She received her BS in education from Columbia in 1904. She then went to work for the New York school system, telling stories to people born overseas. In 1910 she started the first storytelling program for children for the New York Public Library.

Sawyer also wrote articles for The New York Sun, which twice sent her to Ireland to study. While overseas on those and other trips she collected folk tales and continued learning the art of storytelling, eventually becoming well known for her folk tale collections and storytelling prowess. Her life experiences frequently gave Sawyer ideas for her books, and she spent her life collecting and telling folk tales and stories. At least one biographer pointed out the parallel between Sawyer and the Brothers Grimm.

In 1911 Sawyer married ophthalmologist Albert C. Durand. They lived in Ithaca, New York, and had two children, Margaret (Peggy) and David. Peggy, a children's librarian, married Robert McCloskey, who later became a famous children's author and illustrator, best known for writing Make Way for Ducklings.

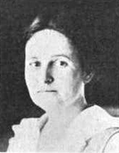
Ruth Sawyer, 1921

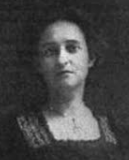
Ruth Sawyer, 1921

Sawyer worked for the Cornell University Extension Services from 1923 to 1933, traveling through rural New York telling stories and lecturing about books. In 1931, though Spain was already torn by factions of the upcoming Civil War, Sawyer spent the year traveling around the country collecting folk tales. While there she met a young boy who would become the model for her book Tono Antonio.

From 1935 to 1945 Sawyer visited the West Virginia Federal Reformatory for Women every month, telling stories. There she met a Hungarian woman who told her about Christmas in her country. This became the basis for Sawyer's The Christmas Anna Angel.

After Sawyer's husband retired in 1946, they moved to Maine, where they lived until resettling in Boston in 1956. In 1965 she received the seventh annual Regina Medal from the Catholic Library Association for "continued, distinguished contribution to children's literature without regard to the nature of the contribution." That year she also became the third recipient of the Children's Literature Legacy Award from the Association for Library Service to Children, which recognizes an author or illustrator whose books, published in the United States, have made "a substantial and lasting contribution to literature for children". At the time, it was awarded every five years.

Sawyer never stopped writing, traveling or telling stories. At age 81 she went to Austria to research the legend of the Dwarf King named Laurin.

Ruth Sawyer, "the great lady of American storytelling", died June 3, 1970, in Lexington, Massachusetts. Her papers are held at St. Catherine University in St. Paul.

== Writing career ==
Sawyer's first book was an adult novel, The Primrose Ring. It appeared in 1915 and was made into a silent film in 1917, starring Mae Murray and an uncredited Loretta Young in her film debut as a fairy.

The next year Sawyer published her first book for children, This Way to Christmas. The story is about a young boy—based on her son, David—whose parents go on a trip and leave him in the care of an Irish couple, Joanna and Barney. In each chapter David listens to a new Christmas story or folk tale.

Sawyer published one book every year or two for the next twenty years. Her best known book, Roller Skates, was published by Viking Press in 1936. A fictional autobiography, Roller Skates tells of one year in the life of ten-year-old Lucinda Wyman, who was named for one of Sawyer's grandmothers. Lucinda's parents are traveling to Europe and leave her with the Misses Peters in New York City. Permitted almost unlimited freedom, Lucinda roller skates through the city, meeting people of all ages and nationalities. Roller Skates is considered ahead of its time because of Lucinda's freedom and the difficult issues that she must navigate throughout the book, such as the death of two of her friends. She won the 1937 Newbery Medal from the professional librarians, recognizing it as the previous year's "most distinguished contribution to American children's literature".

The Year of Jubilo is a sequel to Roller Skates. Published in 1940, it takes Lucinda and her family to Maine after the death of her father. Again Sawyer fictionalized her own life. The next year saw two books published by Sawyer. The Least One, a children's story illustrated by Leo Politi, and The Long Christmas. The latter is a collection of thirteen Christmas legends, rhymes and carols from around the world.

Sawyer's next books appeared in 1944. The Way of the Storyteller is divided into two parts. The first contains directions for those who want to learn storytelling techniques, with practical suggestions for performance, memorization, and improving skills. The second section has eleven stories especially suitable for telling aloud. The Way of the Storyteller was used as a textbook for teachers, librarians and storytellers for many years, appearing in a revised version in 1962.

The second Sawyer book published in 1944 was The Christmas Anna Angel. Based on the stories she heard from a woman in the West Virginia Federal Reformatory, it tells about a young girl growing up in Hungary during World War II. The deprivation of war means there's very little for the family to celebrate with, but the heroine of the story is convinced an angel will provide a miracle in time for Christmas. Illustrated by Hungarian-born Kate Seredy, the book was a runner-up for the Caldecott Medal.

By this time Sawyer's fiction writing was exclusively for children. She published several more children's books in the late 1940s and 1950s, including Maggie Rose, Her Birthday Christmas. Set in Maine, this story of a young girl's dream for a real Christmas birthday party is illustrated by Maurice Sendak.

For Journey Cake, Ho! Sawyer collaborated with her son-in-law Robert McCloskey. Sawyer wrote the story, a fresh take on the theme of run-away food. McCloskey provided the illustrations and he was a runner-up for the 1954 Caldecott.

Sawyer's final children's novel was Daddles, The Story of a Plain Hound-Dog. In Daddles, the narrator remembers three summers she and her brother spent in their cottage in Maine. The first two summers they share their adventures with a hunting dog named Daddles. The third summer they come back to find their companion has died.

== Storytelling ==
Sawyer has been called "a story teller with consummate gifts – whose tales both oral and written should be characterized as living folk-art". Children's literature expert May Hill Arbuthnot called her " a fine storyteller with an unerring sense of words, mood, and the music of narration". She went on to say "There is no one else who can relate Irish stories as she does". Librarians Brandi Florence & Erica Jarvis write "She had an ability to take old narratives and infuse them with new life so as to make them accessible to a new generation".

== Juvenile fiction ==
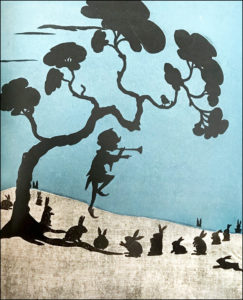
Image from "The Tale of the Enchanted Bunnies" (1923)

- The Tale of the Enchanted Bunnies (Harper, 1923)
- Tono Antonio (Viking, 1934)
- Roller Skates, illustrated by Valenti Angelo (Viking, 1936) ^
- The Year of Jubilo (Viking, 1940)
- The Least One (Viking, 1941)
- The Christmas Anna Angel (Viking, 1944) #
- Maggie Rose, Her Birthday Christmas (Harper, 1952)
- The Enchanted Schoolhouse, illus. Hugh Troy (Viking, 1956)
- The Year of the Christmas Dragon, illus. Troy (Viking, 1960)
- Dietrich of Berne and the dwarf king Laurin, with Emmy Molles, illus. Frederick Chapman (Viking, 1963)
- Daddles, The Story of a Plain Hound-Dog (Little, Brown, 1964)
- The Remarkable Christmas of the Cobbler's Sons, illus. Barbara Cooney

=== Other ===
- This Way to Christmas (Harper, 1915), revised 1967
- The Long Christmas (Viking, 1941)
- Journey Cake, Ho! (Viking, 1953) #
- My Spain: A Storyteller's Year of Collecting (Viking, 1967)

^ Newbery Medal winner
# Caldecott Honor books—runners-up for the picture book illustration award

== Adult fiction ==
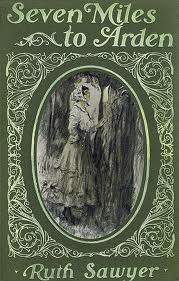

=== Novels ===
- The Primrose Ring, Harper, 1915;
- Seven Miles to Arden, Harper, 1916;
- Herself, Himself, and Myself: A Romance Harper, 1916;
- Leerie, Harper, 1920;
- Folkhouse: The Autobiography of a Home, Appleton Century, 1934;
- Gallant: The Story of Storm Veblun, Appleton Century, 1936.

=== Other ===
- The Way of the Storyteller, Viking 1942, revised 1962;
- How to Tell a Story, Compton, 1962.

=== Recording ===
- Ruth Sawyer, Storyteller, 1965.
