= Anne Carroll Moore =

American writer and librarian (1871–1961)

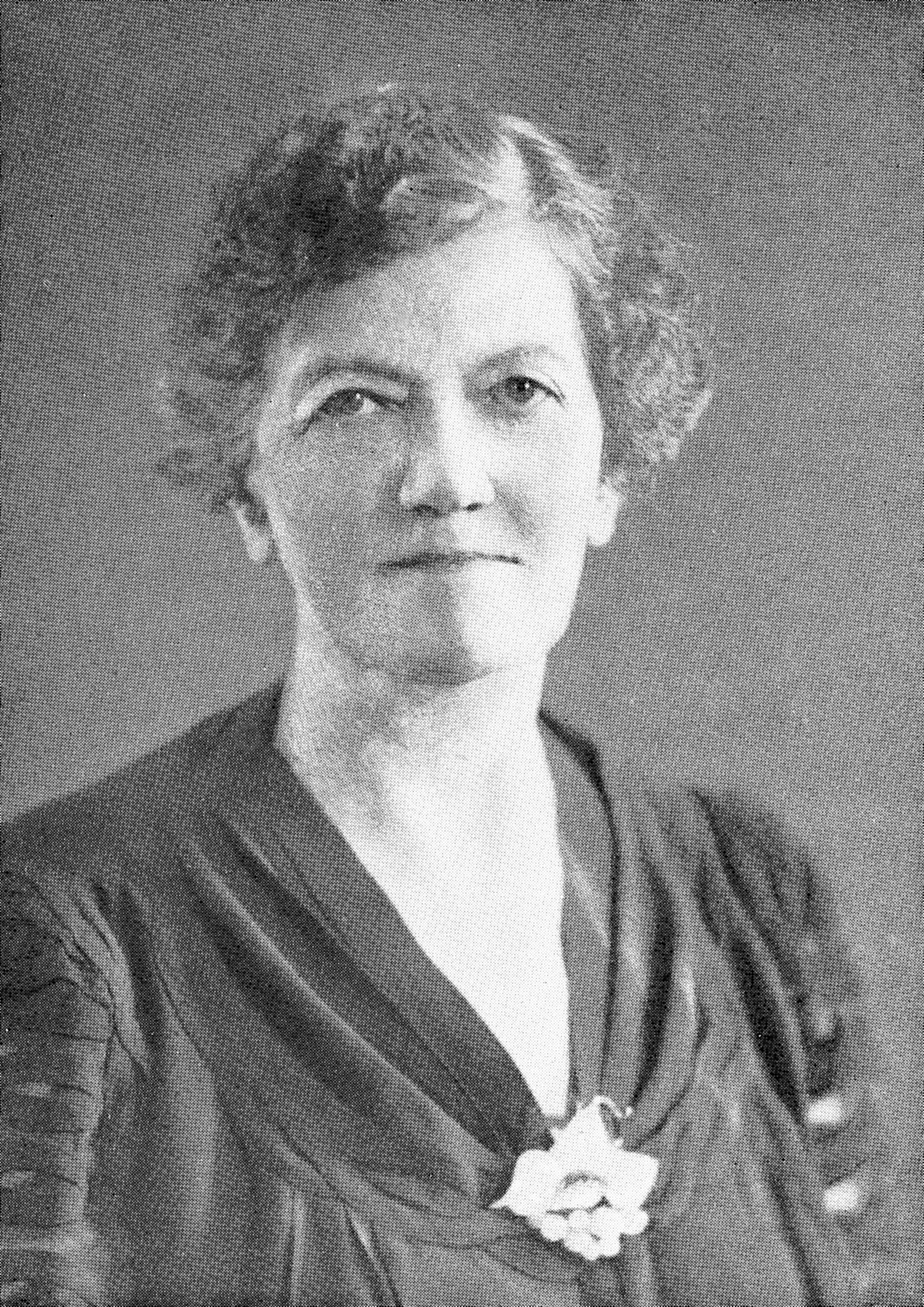
- Born: Annie Carroll Moore; July 12, 1871; Limerick, Maine, US
- Died: January 20, 1961 (aged 89); New York City, US
- Other name: ACM
- Known for: Pioneer children's librarian and book critic

Anne Carroll Moore (July 12, 1871 – January 20, 1961) was an American educator, writer, and advocate for children's libraries.

She was named Annie after an aunt, and officially changed her name to Anne in her fifties, to avoid confusion with Annie E. Moore, another woman who was also publishing material about juvenile libraries at that time. From 1906 to 1941, she headed children's library services for the New York Public Library system. Moore wrote the novel Nicholas: A Manhattan Christmas Story, one of two runners-up for the 1925 Newbery Medal.

== Early life and education 1871–1894 ==
Moore was born in Limerick, Maine. She had seven older brothers and was the only surviving daughter (Note: Two previous female infants had been born but had died suddenly and prematurely as infants.) of Luther Sanborn and Sarah Barker Moore. She described her childhood as a happy one and wrote about growing up in My Roads to Childhood. Moore began her formal education at the Limerick Academy in Maine. She then attended a two-year college, The Bradford Academy in Massachusetts. She was very close to her father (Note: Luther Moore was 50 years old when Annie was born, a Harvard-trained lawyer who became President of the Maine Senate and a Trustee at the Maine Agricultural College.) and hoped to follow in his footsteps as a lawyer, (Note: She worked as a law clerk in her father's office until his death.) despite the biases of her era. The death of both her parents (Note: Luther died 14 January 1892 from influenza; Sarah died on 16 January 1892, also of influenza.) and a sister-in-law (Note: She died in childbirth, two months after the passing of Moore's parents.) made her plans to become a lawyer unattainable. Her brother suggested that she consider the emerging profession of librarian, so Moore applied to the Pratt Institute Library in Brooklyn, where she was accepted into the one-year program (1895) under Mary Wright Plummer.

== Early career 1895–1913 ==
In 1896, Moore graduated from Pratt, and accepted an offer to organize a children's room at that same institute, partly due to a paper which Lutie E. Stearns had presented at the 1894 meeting of the American Library Association (ALA), "Report on the Reading of the Young". Up to this point children had usually been considered a nuisance in library settings, and often were excluded from libraries until they were at least 14 years of age. As part of her research into the proposed children's room, Moore visited kindergartens (also a new concept at the time), toured various ethnic neighborhoods in the area, and even questioned children whom she encountered on the street. Moore then set out to create a welcoming space for children with child-sized furniture, open stacks, cozy reading nooks, story times, puppet shows, summer programming, quality juvenile literature and perhaps most importantly, librarians committed to working with children. When Moore opened the children's room it drew a line of children circling the block awaiting entry. In 1900, she attended a meeting of the American Library Association (ALA) and helped to organize the Club of Children's Librarians. She served as the Club's first chair. This club later became the ALA Children's Services Division (now the Association for Library Service to Children).

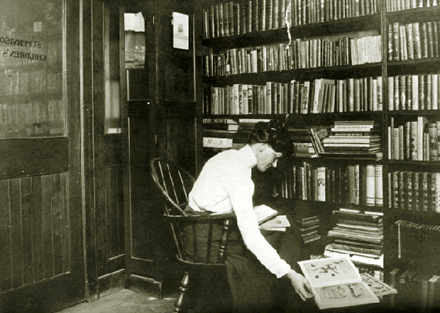
Moore at the New York Public Library in 1914

Moore remained at the Pratt library for ten years. In 1906, she moved to the New York Public Library, having accepted the position of Superintendent of the Department of Work with Children, which Director John Shaw Billings had offered to her. This rather unwieldy title placed her in charge of children's programming at all NYPL branches as well as overseeing the Central Children's Room, which opened in 1911.

Moore also developed a training program for children's services staff: the "Qualification Test for the Children's Librarian Grade". This six-month program included practical training, readings and discussion. She organized hundreds of story times, compiled a list of 2500 Standard Titles in Children's Literature, and she lobbied for and received permission to loan books to children. The children were required to sign a ledger promising to treat books respectfully, and to return them; "When I write my name in this book I promise to take good care of the books I use in the Library and at home, and to obey the rules of the Library." She also initiated a policy of inclusion, celebrating the ethnic diversity of her patrons through story times, poetry readings and books that celebrated the various backgrounds of recent immigrants to the city. She believed her job was to provide, "to the children of foreign parentage a feeling of pride in the beautiful things of the country his parents have left." By 1913, children's books accounted for a third of all the volumes borrowed from the New York Public Library's branches.

== Four Respects ==
Moore developed a set of standards that she called "The Four Respects":

1. Respect for children. She wanted children to be treated as individuals and to be treated seriously.
2. Respect for children's books. Moore was adamant that books for children should be well-written, factually accurate and should not mix fact and fantasy.
3. Respect for fellow workers. She insisted that the children's library be viewed as an integral and equal part of the complete library.
4. Respect for the professional standing of children's librarians. Moore felt that the profession must recognize children's librarianship as a professional specialty.

== Librarian, book reviewer, lecturer, writer 1918–1941 ==
In 1918, Moore delivered a series of lectures to a group of New York publishers and booksellers, promoting the need for quality writing for children. It was the norm of the day that children's books were primarily vehicles for morality lessons, and Moore felt they should be more than this; she stressed the importance of providing access to well written books for the young.

In 1921, Moore gave a series of lectures and toured the libraries of England and France for the ALA. During this tour, she met Walter de la Mare, L. Leslie Brooke, and Beatrix Potter. She is credited with introducing all three to the American public. She also wrote children's books, most famously Nicholas: A Manhattan Christmas Story in which the main character was based on a puppet she used in her story times. This story was one of two runners-up for the 1925 Newbery Medal. She wrote of her own childhood in My Roads to Childhood.

During this period, Moore began to regularly review children's books, writing for The Bookman for six years. Moore eventually went on to become a highly influential children's book reviewer. From 1924 to 1930, she was the children's book reviewer for the New York Herald Tribune. In 1927, her column "The Children's Bookshop" became a regular twice-monthly feature. By 1936, her reviews were also appearing in The Horn Book Magazine. With a few notable exceptions (e.g. E. B. White's Stuart Little (Note: Moore refused to review Stuart Little and was quoted as saying "I was never so disappointed in a book in my life." She wrote to White, saying his book lacked realistic fantasy, the character development was labored, the illustrations were out of scale, and she advised that the book not be published.) and Charlotte's Web), her stamp of approval or disapproval was often widely accepted as final judgment on a book. Her own confidence in her ability as book reviewer is evident in the stamp she kept in her desk: Not Recommended for Purchase by Expert. By all accounts, she was not afraid to use it.

She despised Goodnight Moon by Margaret Wise Brown, published in 1947, seriously impacting sales of the now popular book. For many years, the book was excluded from the New York Public Library.

Moore was forced to retire in 1941, at the age of 70. Initially refusing to cede control to her successor, Frances Clarke Sayers, Moore continued to attend meetings of the New York Public Library. She remained active, writing and teaching for most of her remaining years. She died on 20 January 1961, aged 89.

== Publications ==
- Roads to Childhood (1920)
- Nicholas: A Manhattan Christmas Story, illustrated by Jay Van Everen (1924) – Newbery Medal runner-up
- The Three Owls (1924)
- Three Owls (Volume II) (1924)
- Cross-Roads to Childhood (1926)
- Nicholas and the Golden Goose, illus. Van Everen (1932) – sequel novel
- Reading for Pleasure (1932)
- A Century of Kate Greenaway (1934)
- The Choice of a Hobby (1935)
- New Roads to Childhood (1946)
- Joseph A. Altsheler and American History (1961)

== Mentors and mentees ==
Moore credited two women as her most influential mentors, Mary Wright Plummer (the library director at Pratt) and Caroline Hewins, both pioneers in the development of specialized children's library services. Throughout her career, Moore surrounded herself with talented librarians, storytellers and writers. She mentored in turn many significant authors of children's literature, including Margaret McElderry, children's editor and publisher; Eleanor Estes, winner of the 1952 Newbery Medal and three-time runner-up; Claire Huchet Bishop, author of The Five Chinese Brothers; Marcia Brown, winner of three Caldecott Medals for illustration; and Ruth Hill Viguers, editor of The Horn Book. Several librarians published books that developed from their story times at the New York Public Library Children's Room during Moore's tenure, including Mary Gould Davis, Anna Cogswell Tyler and Pura Belpré.

Moore hired Pura Belpré, the first Puerto Rican Librarian in New York City, in 1929. Because the Central Children's Room of the New York Public Library was privately funded, Moore was allowed greater freedom in her hiring practices. She believed in hiring employees that would relate to the communities to which they would be serving. Frances Clarke Sayers, her successor described them as, "young women with unusual gifts, aptitudes, manifold backgrounds, and varied educational experiences."

In 1937, Moore hired Augusta Baker, a young African-American librarian, for the Harlem branch at 135th Street. Augusta Baker later became head of children's services at the New York Public Library in 1961.

Moore became good friends with fellow library pioneer Valfrid Palmgren, sent by the Swedish government in 1907 to study public libraries in the United States. Moore later visited the Stockholm Children's Library which Palmgren founded and wrote about it in Library Journal. Palmquist referred to Moore as an inspiration and the two kept in contact until Moore's death.

== Children's Book Week ==
With Franklin K. Mathieus, chief librarian for the Boy Scouts of America and Frederic G. Melcher, editor of Publishers Weekly, Moore founded "Children's Book Week" in 1918.

== Awards and recognition ==
In 1932, Moore received from the Pratt Institute a special award, the Diploma of Honour. In 1940, she was twice awarded the Doctor of Letters from the University of Maine. In 1955, she received an Honorary Doctorate from the Pratt Institute. In 1960, the year before her death, she was awarded the Catholic Library Association's Regina Medal "for her pioneer work in children's library services".

Anne Carroll Moore is recognized as one of the most influential figures in 20th-century librarianship in the United States. She was dubbed the "Grande Dame of Children's Services"; a pioneer in the newly emerging specialty of children's literature, librarianship, and publishing.

== Sources ==
- Heim, Kathleen M., ed. (1983). The Status of Women In Librarianship: Historical, Sociological and Economic Issues. New York: Neal-Schuman Publishers, Inc. ix, 483 pp. ISBN 0-918212-62-6
- Miller, Laura (2016). "Anne Carroll Moore, the New York Librarian Who Changed Children's Literature Forever", Slate, August 5, 2016.
