= Bertha Mahony =

American writer (1882–1969)

Bertha Mahony (March 13, 1882 – May 14, 1969), also known as Bertha Mahony Miller, is considered a figurehead of the children's literature movement. She created one of the first children's bookstores in Boston, Massachusetts. Mahony was also the founder of The Horn Book Magazine. Besides being the oldest magazine of its kind in America, Horn Book remains one of the most well-known arbiters of excellence in children's publishing. Mahony was also responsible for the creation of the Horn Book, Inc. publishing company.

== Background ==
Mahony was born on March 13, 1882, in Rockport, Massachusetts. Mahony attended Simmons College in 1902. She participated in an advanced one-year program in the School of Secretarial Studies. During this time, she also joined the Women's Educational and Industrial Union.

Upon completion of her courses, she got a job in the New Library, a lending library. Shortly after, Mahony was employed as Assistant Secretary in Boston's Women's Educational and Industrial Union. She started off as assistant secretary, then was put in charge of promotional materials. Later she became the Associate Chairman of the executive committee of the Unions' little theatre company, The Children's Players, which involved her in a four-year series of children's plays. The theatre company was disbanded in 1917.

== Prelude to the bookshop ==
In August 1915, Mahony read an Atlantic Monthly article titled "A New Profession for Women" by Earl Barnes, that gloriously painted bookselling as a profession for women. This article, combined with her work with children's plays, prompted Mahony to create a bookstore for children.

Mahony enlisted the support of experts in children's literature to fill in her information gaps. She talked to the Boston Public Library's Alice Jordan as well as Frederic Melcher. She visited the Central Children's Room in New York and met Anne Carroll Moore. Other icons in children's literature whom she visited included Clara Hunt and Caroline Hewins. Mahony also gathered financial support from banks and the Women's Educational and Industrial Union.

== The Bookshop for Boys & Girls ==
It does not seem possible that there can be any profession with greater satisfactions, a higher daily excitement or a more vital sense of the surging tides of life than that of a bookman in a bookshop.

— Bertha Mahony, qtd. in Ross, 1973.

The Bookshop for Boys & Girls opened in the beginning of October, 1916. It originally displayed only children's literature of various kinds. The bookshop held all kinds of children's programs, including reading contests. In 1917, Mahony published Books for boys and girls: suggestive purchase list, another first of its kind. In the summer of 1920, Mahony reached out to the community and started the first-ever traveling bookshop. The Book Caravan was a branch of The Bookshop for Boys & Girls, which traveled all around New England. However, it was not able to turn a profit and was disbanded shortly thereafter, despite Mahony's pleas to her backers.

The Bookshop for Boys & Girls was also given a second look due to profit. In 1921, the bookshop moved down the street into a larger area. The wrap-around balcony displayed children's books, while the ground floor contained adult literature. The new sign read 'The Bookshop for Boys and Girls—With Books on Many Subjects for Grown-Ups.' The hope was to bring children in by adding an adult presence.

== The Horn Book magazine ==
Mahony and Elinor Whitney Field created The Horn Book, a magazine that would focus solely on children's books. It was the first such magazine that had an exclusive focus on children's literature. The first issue, published in October 1924, was mainly a list of recommended new books, but the magazine grew to include more than just a booklist. Criticism and philosophy were also added as the field of children's literature expanded. Mahony married William D. Miller in 1932 and resigned from The Bookshop in 1934 to concentrate solely on The Horn Book.

In 1937, the Women's Educational and Industrial Union sold The Bookshop for Boys & Girls, which ultimately killed it. However, Mahony saw the magazine as a continuation of the goals that prompted her to create the bookshop.

Surely all that was good in the Bookshop for Boys and Girls must be blowing about the world like pollen in the wind. It will settle and take root wherever the soil is most favorable to it, and so while dispersed will not be lost.

— Bertha Mahony, qtd. in Ross, 1973.

== The Horn Book publishing company ==
The Horn Book, Inc. was a publishing company Mahony created in her retirement. She published works such as Paul Hazard's lyrical books. The Horn Book, Inc. also published books for which Mahony was editor or co-editor. Those works include: Illustrators of Children's Books: 1744-1945 (1957), Newbery Medal Books: 1922-1955 (1955), and Caldecott Medal Books: 1938-1957 (1957).

== Awards ==
- Mahony won The WNBA Award, formerly known as the Constance Lindsay Skinner Award, in 1955.
- Mahony was an American Library Association Honor Roll Banquet Honoree, June 2000.

== Endnotes ==
Preceded by title started	Horn Book Magazine Editor; 1924 – 1951	Succeeded by Jennie D. Lindquist
