= John and Mary =

Children's book series by Grace James

John and Mary are the subjects of a series of children's books written by Grace James. The series started in the 1930s and finishes in the 1960s. They form part of the 'realistic adventure' tradition in children's literature, following on from similar works by E. Nesbit and Arthur Ransome.

== Plot ==
The stories are set mainly in the Berkshire countryside, at the farmhouse home of the children's grandmother, a Scottish-born woman named Mrs Hawthorne. The farm is called Smockfarthing, and is near to an imaginary village called Smockfarthing Wick, which in turn is close to a town called Riverton. Although these names are invented, they are based on real places - Smockfarthing is actually a house called Stonehill House, and Riverton is Abingdon. The house is mainly inhabited by John, Mary and their aunt 'Push', as well as their grandmother, and they are all real people - Push is Grace James herself, 'Mrs Hawthorne' is her mother, and John and Mary (or Giovanni and Maria) are her nephew and niece. John and Mary's parents live in Rome, as their father is Italian and works there apparently as a diplomat (his work is described in John and Mary Revisit Rome as "involving a great deal of travelling about to far-off places") - he is married to John and Mary's mother, Push's sister (their real names were Henry and Elspeth Cavalletti). John and Mary are educated at home by a governess called Miss Rose Brown, although they spend about half their time in Rome, and indeed are bilingual in English and Italian. Smockfarthing carries a full complement of servants, including Mrs. Dyer the cook, Ellen the parlourmaid, Lizzie (whom the children call Lisetta) the maid, and Edie Kittiwake, the nurse. Edie's father Kittiwake looks after the farm with his son Reggie, and they and Mrs. Kittiwake live in a house on the farm called the Round House. Other characters, such as schoolmasters, vicars, postmistresses and so on, crop up in the books from time to time as well.

Although the series covers about thirty years, John and Mary are never allowed to grow up (only from about the ages of four to twelve) and nothing ever changes very much in their surroundings. This leads to situations such as the war and rationing being discussed during the 1940s, and television and washing machines being mentioned in the 1960s. (One can only assume that Grace James wished to appeal to a constantly fresh readership, although children of the 1960s could possibly have found it rather odd that John and Mary would still have a governess and maids running around after them, in that era.)

The John and Mary stories involve the children doing fairly normal and day-to-day things within their environment (mainly the countryside), although James makes sure that they meet unusual people and have adventures along the way. The stories are written in a realistic way and the adventures are the kind of adventures that any children could have under the same circumstances.

John and Mary's Aunt is not about John and Mary at all, but is about James herself and her upbringing as a child in Japan. We learn that she was born in Tokyo and lived there until she was about twelve, although no exact dates are given. She does mention that her father was part of a naval mission and was there as an instructor - this seems to fit in with the time of the 'Douglas Mission' to Japan, which commenced in 1873 (hence the photographs in the book of her and her siblings in Victorian children's clothing).

The books were published by Frederick Muller and were illustrated by Mary Gardiner.

== List of titles ==
- John and Mary (1935)
- More about John and Mary (1936)
- John and Mary Abroad (1937)
- John and Mary Detectives (1938)
- John and Mary's Secret Society (1939)
- John and Mary's Visitors (1940)
- New Friends for John and Mary (1941)
- John and Mary and Miss Rose Brown (1942)
- John and Mary at School (1944)
- John and Mary's Youth Club (1945)
- John and Mary at Riverton (1946)
- The Adventures of John and Mary (1947)
- John and Mary's Aunt (1950)
- John and Mary in Rome (1954)
- John and Mary's Fairy Tales (1955)
- John and Mary by Land and Sea (1955)
- John and Mary's Japanese Fairy Tales (1957)
- John and Mary and Lisetta (1958)
- John and Mary's Treasures (1960)
- John and Mary Revisit Rome (1963)

== Reviews ==
- "For neatness, sureness of touch, economy of effort, John and Mary leave the rest standing. They always do . . . they are as good at home as abroad." New Statesman (c. 1947)
- "If I were around eight years old I could read about John and Mary, Granny and Miss Rose Brown, and Push, quite indefinitely . . . For sheer, simple straight-forward fun and credibility, with just a dash of moralising worked in subtly, the John and Mary series would take a lot of beating." Time and Tide (magazine) (c. 1955)

== Other books by Grace James ==
- Green Willow and Other Japanese Fairy Tales (1910) - illustrated by Warwick Goble
- Japan Recollections and Impressions (1936)
- The Blakes and the Blacketts (1939)
- Nibs (1951)
- Nibs and the New World (1953)
- Sweetings (1957)
