= Regina Medal =

- Awarded for: "continued, distinguished contribution" to the field of children's literature
- Location: Indianapolis, Indiana
- Country: United States
- Presented by: Catholic Library Association
- First award: 1959
- Website: www.cathla.org/awards/regina-medal

The Regina Medal is a literary award conferred annually by the Catholic Library Association. It recognizes one living person for "continued, distinguished contribution to children's literature without regard to the nature of the contribution" and several recipients have been neither writers nor illustrators of children's books. It was inaugurated in 1959, and it is administered by the Children's Library Services Section.

On the sixtieth anniversary of the Regina Medal, its history was explored, and its recognition of literary careers that have spanned many generations and the aggregate impact their work has made on education, literacy, art, and librarianship for children was characterized as "immeasurable."

== Regina Medal winners ==
- 1959 Eleanor Farjeon
- 1960 Anne Carroll Moore
- 1961 Padraic Colum
- 1962 Frederic G. Melcher
- 1963 Ann Nolan Clark
- 1964 May Hill Arbuthnot
- 1965 Ruth Sawyer
- 1966 Leo Politi
- 1967 Bertha Mahony Miller
- 1968 Marguerite de Angeli
- 1969 Lois Lenski
- 1970 Ingri and Edgar Parin d'Aulaire
- 1971 Tasha Tudor
- 1972 Meindert DeJong
- 1973 Frances Clarke Sayers
- 1974 Robert McCloskey
- 1975 May McNeer and Lynd Ward
- 1976 Virginia Haviland
- 1977 Marcia Brown
- 1978 Scott O'Dell
- 1979 Morton Schindel
- 1980 Beverly Cleary
- 1981 Augusta Baker
- 1982 Theodor Seuss Geisel
- 1983 Tomie dePaola
- 1984 Madeleine L'Engle
- 1985 Jean Fritz
- 1986 Lloyd Alexander
- 1987 Betsy Byars
- 1988 Katherine Paterson
- 1989 Steven Kellogg
- 1990 Virginia Hamilton
- 1991 Leonard Everett Fisher
- 1992 Jane Yolen
- 1993 Chris Van Allsburg
- 1994 Lois Lowry
- 1995 Gary Paulsen
- 1996 Russell Freedman
- 1997 Eve Bunting
- 1998 Patricia McKissack and Frederick McKissack
- 1999 Eric Carle
- 2000 Milton Meltzer
- 2001 E. L. Konigsburg
- 2002 Charlotte Zolotow
- 2003 Jean Craighead George
- 2004 Susan Hirschman
- 2005 Jerry Pinkney
- 2006 Paul Goble
- 2007 Margaret K. McElderry
- 2008 Vera B. Williams
- 2009 Lois Ehlert
- 2010 Gail Gibbons
- 2011 Ashley Bryan
- 2012 Patricia Polacco
- 2013 Kevin Henkes
- 2014 Patricia Reilly Giff
- 2015 Judy Blume
- 2016 Lee Bennett Hopkins
- 2017 David A. Adler
- 2018 Andrea Davis Pinkney and Brian Pinkney
- 2019 Kate DiCamillo
- 2020 Christopher Paul Curtis
- 2021 Jan Brett
- 2022 Sophie de Mullenheim
- 2023 Pam Muñoz Ryan
- 2024 Eric Kimmel
- 2025 Ruta Sepetys
