= Frances Clarke Sayers =

American librarian

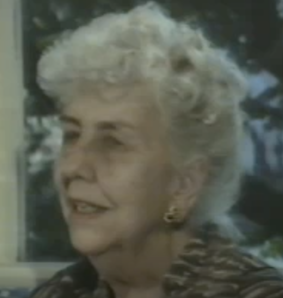
- Sayers in 1977
- Born: September 4, 1897; Topeka, Kansas
- Died: June 24, 1989 (aged 91); Ojai, California
- Occupations: Librarian and author

Frances Clarke Sayers (September 4, 1897 – June 24, 1989) was an American children's librarian, author of children's books, and lecturer on children's literature. In 1999, American Libraries named her one of the "100 Most Important Leaders We Had in the 20th Century".

== Biography ==
Frances Clarke was born on September 4, 1897, in Topeka, Kansas, to parents Oscar Lincoln Clarke and Marian Busby. When she was a child she moved with her family to Galveston, Texas, which would later prove to be a great source of inspiration for her numerous children's books. In an essay published in the September 15, 1956, edition of Library Journal, she reminisces about a woman telling her the story of the Gingerbread Man. Sayers states that, "I cannot recall her name, but her eyes were brown, her hair the exact shade of her eyes, she was short and plump, and I would know her voice were I even to hear it in paradise."

== Career ==
While it was in her early years that she fell in love with the art of storytelling, it was not until the age of twelve, when she read an article in St. Nicholas Magazine regarding service to children in the New York Public Library, that Frances Clarke decided to become a children's librarian. She attended the University of Texas at Austin, but after spending only two years there she left in order to attend the Carnegie Library School in Pittsburgh because that university was "noted for its devoted staff and belief in taking books to children wherever they were". After graduation, she began her career in librarianship when Anne Carroll Moore, Superintendent of the Department of Work with Children at the New York Public Library, invited her to come to work there.

In 1923, after five years with the NYPL, Frances Clarke decided to move to California to be closer to her family. There she wed her longtime friend Alfred H.P. Sayers. The couple moved to Chicago where Alfred Sayers owned a bookstore. In Chicago, Sayers helped her husband run his bookstore and worked part-time as an editorial assistant for the American Library Association. Unfortunately, the Great Depression caused a lack of business for the Sayers's bookstore and they decided to move back to California. Soon Sayers began to write children's books that would delight and enchant children, as well as adults, throughout the years. Her books were often semi-autobiographical, often bringing back the sights, smells, and sounds of her childhood in Texas.

In California Sayers added another title to her repertoire: that of lecturer. "In 1936 she offered a course in children's literature at the Library School of the University of California, Berkeley, where she emphasized high standards of criticism, respect for children and children's books, and delight in storytelling."

In 1941, Sayers moved back to New York to replace Anne Carroll Moore at the NYPL as Superintendent of the Department of Work with Children. While Superintendent Sayers also "taught a course in writing for children at the New School for Social Research...and served as a consultant to the Library of Congress for the reorganization of its Children's Book Collection."

In 1952, after eleven years with the NYPL, Sayers retired from the life of a public librarian. However, her active spirit would not allow her to rest. In no time, Sayers was back lecturing students on the importance of children's literature. Throughout 1953 and 1954 Sayers traveled to many universities lecturing on this topic.

Sayers moved back to California to live with her sister. It was not long before Sayers was once again summoned to step into the role of lecturer. Sayers now found herself "Senior Lecturer in the English department for the University of California, Los Angeles. When the UCLA School of Library Service opened in 1960, she was invited to offer the course in children's literature there also." She retired from lecturing in the mid-1960s, but continued writing children's books and for scholarly journals. She died in her home of a stroke at the age of 91.

== Essays and speeches ==
=== "Summoned by Books" ===
"Summoned by Books" is a speech Sayers gave in November 1962 at the annual meeting of the California Library Association. She speaks on the issue that librarians need to make themselves known and appreciated once again, and to do that, they need to appreciate themselves. Sayers tells them that not only are they responsible for helping patrons find the information they want, but that as librarians, they are responsible for sharing with patrons the same love and appreciation they feel for books as well. She states that, "…as librarians we are not only summoned by books ourselves, but we are the instrumentation for the summoning of others."

=== "Happy Botheration" ===
"Happy Botheration" was published in the November 1954 School Library Association of California Bulletin. In "Happy Botheration" Sayers discusses her move back to California and her thoughts while she was unpacking her many books. She goes into detail about how much she has come to love and care for her books, and how she would not part with them for all the money in the world. She manages to capture her admiration for literature by the way she talks about her experience as an assistant librarian for the New York Public Library, as well as by discussing her need to mark pages that hold some of her favorite passages. Of this, Sayers says that while unpacking she appreciates looking through her books and as "[o]ne [is] leafing through, and there is the favorite passage, the eye [is] caught and held, the mind following after."

=== "Of Memory and Muchness" ===
In her speech "Of Memory and Muchness", which she gave in November 1956 at a meeting of the California Library Association, Sayers begins by questioning what is meant in the passage of Alice in Wonderland where the Dormouse talks of Alice learning to draw and in turn, drawing many things including "memory, and muchness." From this Sayers discusses children's books that have survived and thrived throughout the ages, asking everyone to remember their favorite book. Sayers also talks of the effect of "muchness" in society and the commercialization of literature, warning her fellow librarians of the likes of Walt Disney, saying, "Walt Disney is another big book promoter, and is quite without conscience as to how he waters down, distorts, and vulgarizes such books of high originality…Muchness acclaims Mr. Disney."

== Awards ==
Throughout her long career, Frances Clarke Sayers was recognized for her many contributions and achievements in librarianship and children's literature. In 1965 she was honored by the American Library Association with the Joseph W. Lippincott Award for her distinguished service in librarianship.

In 1966 she received the Clarence Day Award for "Summoned by Books", her collection of speeches and writings. Sayers was also awarded the Southern California Children's Literature Award in 1969 and the Catholic Library Association Regina Medal in 1973.

== Writings and contributions ==
- Sayers, Frances Clarke, and Helen Sewell. Bluebonnets for Lucinda. New York: Viking, 1934.
- Sayers, Frances Clarke. Mr. Tidy Paws. New York: Viking Press, 1935.
- Sayers, Frances Clarke, and Helen Sewell. Tag-Along Tooloo. New York: The Viking Press, 1941.
- Sayers, Frances Clarke. Sally Tait. New York: Viking Press, 1951.
- Sayers, Frances Clarke. Ginny and Custard. New York: Viking Press, 1951.
- Sayers, Frances Clarke; Sickels, Evelyn, eds. (1970). Anthology of Children's Literature (4th ed.). Boston: Houghton Mifflin.
- Sayers, Frances Clarke; Blinn, Marjeanne Jensen (1965). Summoned by Books: Essays and Speeches by Frances Clarke Sayers. New York: Viking Press.
- Sayers, Frances Clarke. Forward. From Two to Five. By Kornei Chukovskii. Brisbane: Jacaranda, 1963.
- Sayers, Frances Clarke (Summer 1963). "The American Origins of Public Library Work with Children". Library Trends. 12 (1): 6–13.
- Sayers, Frances Clark. Introduction. Grimm's Fairy Tales. By Jakob Grimm. New York: Follett, 1968.
- Sayers, Frances Clarke, and Gunnar Anderson. Oscar Lincoln Busby Stokes. New York: Harcourt, Brace & World, 1970.
- Sayers, Frances Clarke (1972). Anne Carroll Moore: A Biography. New York: Atheneum.Twenty years earlier, Sayers's old mentor, too, battled the rising tide of vulgarity — Ursula Nordstrom's revolutionary "good books for bad children" at Harper & Row.
- Sayers also wrote the foreword to the art piece, Children from Many Lands Illustrate Grimm's Fairy Tales, which is a collection of drawings by children of their interpretation of stories from Grimm's Fairy Tales.
- Sayers, Frances Clarke. Preface. The Wind in the Willows. By Kenneth Grahame. New York: Charles Scribner, 1960.
