= Grace James =

English writer and folklorist

- Born: 11 November 1882 Tokyo, Japan
- Died: 6 February 1965 (aged 82) Rome, Italy
- Occupation: Writer, folklorist
- Period: 20th century
- Genre: Children's literature

Grace Edith Marion James (11 November 1882 – 6 February 1965, in Rome) was an English writer, born in Tokyo. She was both an author of children's literature and a Japanese folklorist. Her Japanese Fairy Tales (1910) collected and retold stories from the Japanese folk tradition. It was illustrated by Warwick Goble.

Green Willow and Other Japanese Fairy tales and The Moon Maiden and Other Japanese Fairy Tales are other editions of the original collection. The Three Dwarf Trees is based on a Japanese play. Japan: Recollections and Impressions, a memoir of her experiences in Japan, was first published in 1936.

Grace James also wrote the John and Mary children's adventure series, one of which, John and Mary's Aunt, is about the author's upbringing in Japan. Her father Thomas was a British Naval officer, who was a member of one of the Naval Missions which visited Japan (probably the Douglas Mission, as the dates coincide). Her parents went there around 1873 and she was born in Tokyo seven years later (to be followed by a brother and a sister). The family lived in five houses in and around Tokyo during this period, and spent their summers at Nikko, Kamakura and Karuizawa. When Grace was twelve, the whole family moved back to England.

== Published books ==
- Green Willow and Other Japanese Fairy Tales (Macmillan, 1910), illustrated by Warwick Goble; re-issued as Japanese Fairy Tales and as Moon Maiden and Other Japanese Fairy Tales
- John and Mary (1935)
- More about John and Mary (1936)
- Japan Recollections and Impressions (1936)
- John and Mary Abroad (1937)
- John and Mary Detectives (1938)
- John and Mary's Secret Society (1939)
- The Blakes and the Blacketts (1939)
- John and Mary's Visitors (1940)
- New Friends for John and Mary (1941)
- John and Mary and Miss Rose Brown (1942)
- John and Mary at School (1944)
- John and Mary's Youth Club (1945)
- John and Mary at Riverton (1946)
- The Adventures of John and Mary (1947)
- John and Mary's Aunt (1950)
- Nibs (1951)
- Nibs and the New World (1953)
- John and Mary in Rome (1954)
- John and Mary's Fairy Tales (1955)
- John and Mary by Land and Sea (1955)
- John and Mary's Japanese Fairy Tales (1957)
- Sweetings (1957)
- John and Mary and Lisetta (1958)
- John and Mary's Treasures (1960)
- John and Mary Revisit Rome (1963)
