= Fred M. White =

British writer

Fred Merrick White (1859–1935) wrote a number of novels and short stories under the name "Fred M. White" including the six "Doom of London" science-fiction stories, in which various catastrophes beset London. These include The Four Days' Night (1903), in which London is beset by a massive killer smog; The Dust of Death (1903), in which diphtheria infects the city, spreading from refuse tips and sewers; and The Four White Days (1903), in which a sudden and deep winter paralyses the city under snow and ice. These six stories all first appeared in Pearson's Magazine, and were illustrated by Warwick Goble. He was also a pioneer of the spy story, and in 2003, his series The Romance of the Secret Service Fund (written in 1899) was edited by Douglas G. Greene and published by Battered Silicon Dispatch Box.

== Life ==
Fred Merrick White was born in 1859 in West Bromwich, a small town near Birmingham, England. The record of his birth indicates that he was born in the June quarter and that his first name was actually "Fred" — not, as is often assumed, "Frederick". His second name, "Merrick", was the maiden name of his mother, Helen, who married his father, Joseph, in West Bromwich in the September quarter of 1858.

At the time of the 1861 census Joseph and Helen White were living with their son at 18 Carters Green, West Bromwich. The census record gives Joseph's occupation as "solicitor's managing clerk." Ten years later the family was living in Hereford, a county town in West England.

Before becoming a full-time writer, White followed in his father's footsteps, working as a solicitor's clerk in Hereford. By the time of the 1881 census, Joseph White, Sr., was a fully-fledged solicitor and was now quite prosperous. In 1891 White was working full-time as a journalist and author, presumably earning enough to support himself and his mother, Helen, who, in the census record for that year figures as the head of the household in the Barton Road villa. In the June quarter of the following year, 1892, White married Clara Jane Smith. The wedding took place at King's Norton, Worcestershire, and the couple had two children.

In the 1911 census, Fred M. White, aged 52, and his wife Clara were living at Uckfield, a town in East Sussex. During the First World War, White's sons served as junior officers in The Royal Inniskilling Fusiliers. In November 1915 the elder boy, Sydney Eric, was gazetted as a Second Lieutenant (on probation).

The First World War and his sons' war-time experiences evidently influenced White's writing during and after this conflict. His novel 'The Seed of Empire' (1916) describes some of the early trench warfare in great detail and the places and events are historically accurate. A number of novels published in the 1920s concern the social changes caused by the war and the difficulties of ex-soldiers in fitting back into normal civilian life.

Fred and Clara spent their final years in Barnstaple in the County of Devon, an area which provided the backdrop for his novels The Mystery of Crocksands, The Riddle of the Rail and The Shadow of the Dead Hand. White died in Barnstaple in December 1935, his wife, Clara Jane, died in March 1940.

== Works ==
=== Novels ===
- A Golden Argosy (1886)
- By Order of the League (1886)
- The Old Secretaire: A Christmas Story (1887)
- The Silver Stream (1888)
- Naboth's Vineyard (1889)
- The Island of Shadows (1892)
- A Daughter of Israel, (1892)
- In Trust (1892)
- The Robe of Lucifer (1896)
- The White Battalions (1900)
- Tregarthen's Wife: A Cornish Story (1901)
- Blackmail (1903)
- The Cardinal Moth (1903)
- The Weight of the Crown (1904)
- A Shadowed Love (1905)
- My Lady Bountiful (1905)
- The Corner House; or, A Web of Deception (1905)
- The Crimson Blind; or, The Mystery of the Crimson Blind (1905)
- The Psalm Stone (1905)
- The Ends of Justice (1906)
- The House of the Schemers (1906)
- The Law of the Land (1906)
- The Nether Millstone (1906)
- The Slave of Silence (1906)
- The Yellow Face (1906)
- Behind the Mask; or, A Fatal Dose (1907)
- The Edge of the Sword (1907)
- The Five Knots (1907)
- The Four Fingers; or, the Mystery of the Four Fingers (1907)
- The Lonely Bride; or, The White Bride (1907)
- The Lord of the Manor (1907)
- The Midnight Guest: A Detective Story (1907)
- The Open Door (1907)
- A Queen of the Stage (1908)
- Craven Fortune (1908)
- Paul Quentin (1908)
- The Bubble Reputation (1908)
- The Scales of Justice; or, Secret of the Moat House (1908)
- The Sundial (1908)
- A Crime on Canvas (1909)
- A Maker of Millions (1909)
- Netta, the Story of Sin (1909)
- The Garden O'Dreams (1909)
- The Golden Rose (1909)
- Un viaje trágico, lit. "A Tragic Journey" (1909)
- A Front of Brass (1910)
- A Mummer's Throne (1910)
- Hard Pressed (1910)
- Love, the Foe (1910)
- Paul, the Sage (1910)
- The White Glove (1910)
- A House of Sorrows (1911)
- Dropped from the Fast Express; or, A Daughter's Sacrifice (1911)
- Jim Crowshaw's Mary (1911)
- The Brand of Silence (1911)
- The Man Called Gilray (1911)
- The Mystery of the Ravenspurs; or, The Black Valley (1911)
- The Secret of the Sands (1911)
- Claxton's Mill (1912)
- Powers of Darkness (1912)
- A Royal Wrong (1913)
- A Secret Service (1913)
- Lady Clara (1913)
- The House of Mammon (1913)
- The Sentence of the Court (1913)
- Number Thirteen (1914)
- The Day; or, the Passing of aThrone (1914)
- The Lady in Blue (1915)
- The Man Who Found Christmas (1915)
- Ambition's Slave (1916)
- The Seed of Empire (1916)
- A Society Jezebel (1917)
- A Harbour of Refuge (1918)
- The Case for the Crown (1918)
- The Salt of the Earth (1918)
- The Argus Eye (1919)
- The Wings of Victory (1919)
- Lady Edna's Awakening (1920)
- The Happy Exile (1920)
- The Honour of His House (1920)
- The Leopard's Spots (1920)
- The Man Who Was Two (1921)
- The Councillors of Falconhoe (1922)
- The Mystery of Room 75 (1922)
- A Deal in Letters (1923)
- The Green Bungalow (1923)
- The Mystery of Crocksands (1923)
- The Turn of the Tide (1923)
- The Devil's Advocate (1924)
- The Golden Bat (1924)
- The Fight for the Child (1925)
- The House on the River (1925)
- The Man With the Vandyk Beard (1925)
- The Price of Silence (1925)
- The Riddle of the Rail (1926)
- The Shadow of the Dead Hand (1926)
- The King Diamond (1927)
- The Grey Woman; or, Sinister House (1928)
- A Broken Memory (1929)
- The Phantom Car (1929)
- A Clue in Wax (1930)
- Found Dead (1930)
- On the Night Express (1930)
- Queen of Hearts c. (1930)
- The Man Who Knew (1932)
- Secret of the River (1934)
- The Blue Daffodil (1934)
- New Century Calendar Clue (1948)

=== Short fiction ===
The following items are from the list published by Roy Glashan.

==== Short story series ====
1. The Doom of London (1903)

- "The Four Days' Night"
- "The Dust of Death"
- "The Four White Days"
- "The Invisible Force"
- "The River of Death"
- "A Bubble Burst"

2. The Romance of the Secret Service Fund (1900)

- "By Woman's Wit"
- "The Mazaroff Rifle "
- "In the Express"
- "The Almedi Concession"
- "The Other Side of the Chessboard"
- "Three of Them"

3. The Master Criminal (1898)

- "The Head of the Caesars"
- "At Windsor"
- "The Silverpool Cup"
- "The 'Morrison Raid' Indemnity"
- "Cleopatra's Robe"
- "The Rosy Cross"
- "The Death of the President"
- "The Cradlestone Oil Mills"
- "Redburn Castle"
- "Crysoline Limited"
- "The Loss Of The 'Eastern Empress'"
- "General Marcos"

4. Real Dramas (1909)

- "His Second Self"
- "An Extra Turn"
- ""Not in the Bill""
- "The Plagiarist"
- "The Man in Possession"
- "A Pair of Handcuffs"

5. The Dragon Fly (1909)

- "How Horace Daimler Got His Name"
- "The Three Red Hats"
- "A Cloud of Butterflies"
- "The Three Alarm Clocks"
- "A Reconstructed Crime"
- "The Mirror Over the Fireplace"

6. The Adventures of Drenton Denn, Special Commissioner (1898)

- "The Red Speck"
- "The Yellow Moth"
- "Dust"
- "The Fire Bugs"
- "The Great White Moth"

7. "Gipsy" Tales (1903-1916)

- "A Matter of Kindness" (1903)
- "A Liberal Education" (1903)
- "A Stranger in Bohemia" (1915)
- "Drops of Water" (1915)
- "The Unpremeditated Curtain" (1915)
- "Mere Details" (1915)
- "Out of Season" (1916)

8. "The Last of the Borgias" (1898)

- "The Scrip of Death"
- "The Crimson Streak"
- "The Holy Rose"
- "The Saving of Serena"
- "The Varteg Necklace"
- "The Three Carnations"

9. The "Gentle Buccaneer" Stories (1919)

- "Beauty in Distress"
- "The Grey Raider"
- "The Shifting Sand"

10. "The Sage of Tyburn" Stories (1905-1906)

- "The Chronicle of the Yellow Girl"
- "The Chronicle of the BlueEyed Syndicate"
- "The Chronicle of the Inconsequent Princess"
- "The Chronicle of the Elderly Adonis"
- "The Chronicle of the Libelled Velasquez"
- "The Chronicle of the Compleat Letter-Writer"

==== Other uncollected short stories ====
- "The Hospitallers" (May 1890)
- "A Bad Cold" (June 1890)
- "Found!" (September 1890)
- "Forget-Me-Not" (October 1890)
- "A Message from the Flood" (May 1892)
- "Burglar Bill's Pupil" (October 1892)
- "More Than Coronets" (March 1894)
- "An Eastern Princess" (January 1898)
- "Santa Anna" (April 1898)
- "The Azoff Diamonds" (July 1898)
- "The Purple Terror" (September 1898)
- "The Joinville Tunnel" (November 1898)
- "Compounding a Felony" (April 1899)
- "Moray the Traitor" (July 1899)
- "The Emsdam Dispatches" (September 1899)
- "The White Geranium" (December 1899)
- "A Satisfactory Reference" (April 1900)
- "The Throat of the Wolf" (January 1901)
- "A Foster-Father" (June 1901)
- "The Black Narcissus" (December 1901)
- "One Day with a Working Ant" (December 1901)
- "Pictures in the Snow" (December 1901)
- "One of the Old Guard" (February 1902)
- "An Unrecorded Crime" (May 1902)
- "The Dormer Window" (August 1902)
- "The Shebeeners" (September 1902)
- "This Little World" (November 1902)
- "Blind" (December 1902)
- "Hardy's Big Coup" (January 1903)
- "The Black Cat" (February 1903)
- "The Orpheusia" (July 1903)
- "The Heart of an Anarchist" (September 1903)
- "A Stolen Interview" (November 1903)
- "A Game of Draughts" (December 1903)
- "Red Petals" (February 1904)
- "By Grace of His Majesty" (April 1904)
- "Aunt Mary" (May 1904)
- "The Northern Light" (October 1904)
- "The Other Man's Story" (December 1904)
- "Unbidden Guests" (February 1905)
- "The Doubting D-, or, A Cranky Cryptogram" (March 1905)
- "Dust" (March 1905)
- "Two of Them" (March 1905)
- "A Table Tragedy" (March 1905)
- "The Night Express" (March 1905)
- "A Friendly Call" (March 1905)
- "'Special' to the Telephone" (March 1905)
- "The Law Of The Jungle. A Tale of Mean Streets" (March 1905)
- "Natural Selection" (March 1905)
- "My Lady Bountiful" (March 1905)
- "The Charlatan" (September 1905)
- "The Last Drive" (January 1906)
- "The Onus Of The Charge" (May 1906)
- "The Two Bon-Bons" (May 1906)
- "The Midnight Call" (June 1906)
- "The Stranger Within the Gate" (December 1906)
- "In the Dark" (April 1907)
- "In the Mine" (April 1907)
- "The Buff Gauntlet" (June 1907)
- "The Luck of the Game" (September 1907)
- "The Balance of Nature" (October 1907)
- "The Black Admiral" (December 1907)
- "The Guiding Star" (December 1907)
- "Treasures Three" (January 1908)
- "Crossed Swords" (March 1908)
- "For Value Received" (May 1908)
- "The White Spot" (May 1908)
- "The Kingmaker's Token" (June 1908)
- "A Block of Marble" (July 1908)
- "A Masked Battery" (July 1908)
- "An Object Lesson" (July 1908)
- "An Error of Judgment" (October 1908)
- "The First Stone" (October 1908)
- "The Sword of Justice" (October 1908)
- "The Eye of the Camera" (December 1908)
- "Her Christmas Dawn" (December 1908)
- "At Short Notice" (February 1909)
- "The Clock Struck Twelve" (February 1909)
- "Ice in June" (February 1909)
- "The Heels of the Dawn" (March 1909)
- "The Language of Flowers" (April 1909)
- "The Unexpected" (May 1909)
- "The Ebbing Tide" (June 1909)
- "The Empty House" (June 1909)
- "The Path of Progress" (June 1909)
- "The Thirty-Seventh Month" (June 1909)
- "The Man with the Eye-Glass" (September 1909)
- "Applied Mechanics" (November 1909)
- "The Colonel's Christmas Pudding" (December 1909)
- "In the Fog" (December 1909)
- "After Reynolds" (January 1910)
- "A Record Round" (March 1910)
- "The Better Way" (April 1910)
- "The Salmon Poachers" (July 1910)
- "In Black and White" (August 1910)
- "Sub Rosa" (September 1910)
- "The Substitute" (September 1910)
- "The Ticket" (September 1910)
- "The Waterwitch" (September 1910)
- "His Majesty's Mails" (November 1910)
- "A Modern Scrooge" (December 1910)
- "Nerves" (January 1911)
- "The Desert Ship" (May 1911)
- "Lady Mary's Bulldog" (May 1911)
- "The Half-Crown Princess" (July 1911)
- ""To Be Let Furnished"" (July 1911)
- "The Missing Note" (August 1911)
- "The Pardon" (August 1911)
- "The Sixteenth Chapter" (August 1911)
- "A Broken Sceptre" (September 1911)
- "The Evidence for the Prisoner" (September 1911)
- "Art Critics" (October 1911)
- "The Livery of Death" (October 1911)
- "A Derelict in Clover" (November 1911)
- "A Christmas Bride" (December 1911)
- "A Rope Of Snow" (December 1911)
- "The Royal Train" (December 1911)
- "The Lesson the Ants Taught" (February 1912)
- "Imperial Preference" (March 1912)
- "A Sleeping Partner" (April 1912)
- "The Eavesdropper" (May 1912)
- "'Merica" (May 1912)
- "A Gamble in Love" (June 1912)
- "The Hand Invisible" (July 1912)
- "The Ace of Hearts" (August 1912)
- "Ostentation" (August 1912)
- "Autumn Manouevres" (September 1912)
- "The Left Hand" (September 1912)
- "Kindergarten" (November 1912)
- "The Third Act" (December 1912)
- "The Vital Spot" (January 1913)
- "The Western Way" (August 1913)
- "Judgment Reserved" (September 1913)
- "Anonymous" (October 1913)
- "Karma" (November 1913)
- "The Missing Blade" (December 1913)
- "Pearls of Price" (January 1914)
- "Gentlemen of the Jury" (May 1914)
- "The Straight Game" (June 1914)
- "In the Pit" (July 1914)
- "According to the Statute" (August 1914)
- "Denny" (September 1914)
- "Full Fathoms Deep" (October 1914)
- "For Once in a Way" (January 1915)
- "In Rosemary Lane" (April 1915)
- "Second in the Field" (April 1915)
- "Sister Louise" (June 1915)
- "A Corner in Elephants" (November 1915)
- "The Apple-Green Plate" (December 1915)
- "Billy's Christmas" (December 1915)
- "The Long Arm of Bronze" (January 1916)
- "A Question of Money" (January 1916)
- "The Second Chapter" (January 1916)
- "A Thrilling Exit" (February 1916)
- "A Deal in Diamonds" (May 1916)
- "One Foggy Night" (May 1916)
- "Love in Aether" (June 1916)
- "A Bit of Egypt" (July 1916)
- "The Grey Bat" (July 1916)
- "A Single Hair" (August 1916)
- "The World Next Door" (September 1916)
- "The Black Prince" (October 1916)
- "The Fourth Man" (November 1916)
- "Photo by Lesterre" (February 1917)
- "A Garden of Pearls" (March 1917)
- "The Dawnstar" (April 1917)
- "A Dose of Quinine" (May 1917)
- "The Superman" (June 1917)
- "Below Zero" (July 1917)
- "A Matter of Habit" (August 1917)
- "Blind Chance" (September 1917)
- "The Case for the Prisoner" (September 1917)
- "The Real Dramatic Touch" (September 1917)
- "The Lonely Furrow" (November 1917)
- "A Call on the Phone" (December 1917)
- "A Christmas Deputy" (December 1917)
- "A Draught of Life" (February 1918)
- "Sleeping Partner" (February 1918)
- "A Parrot-Cry" (June 1918)
- "The Arms of Chance" (July 1918)
- "The Convict" (December 1918)
- "A Plague of Butterflies" (December 1918)
- "The Big Thing" (January 1919)
- "The Witness of the Skies" (January 1919)
- "Beauty in Distress" (April 1919)
- "The Shifting Sands" (April 1919)
- "The Grey Raider" (June 1919)
- "Coralie and the Pearls" (July 1919)
- "From Information Received" (December 1919)
- "A Place in the Sun" (January 1920)
- "The Witness" (February 1920)
- "The Broken Trail" (April 1920)
- "Gabrielle" (June 1920)
- "Made in England" (June 1920)
- "An Ally" (July 1920)
- "Rose of the Desert" (November 1920)
- "The Mystery of Room Five" (December 1920)
- "Not on the Records" (February 1921)
- "The Broken Lute" (May 1921)
- "The Man Himself" (September 1921)
- "Saviour From The North" (October 1921)
- "The Master's Voice" (November 1921)
- "The Mistletoe Bough" (December 1921)
- "Poste Restante" (December 1921)
- "The Gates of Ramshi" (January 1922)
- "The Vital Spark" (February 1922)
- "Rob Peter—Pay Paul" (March 1922)
- "Rachel's Seventh Year" (April 1922)
- "The Dancing Shadow" (May 1922)
- "The Daughters of the Moon" (June 1922)
- "Music Hath Charms" (June 1922)
- "By Wireless" (July 1922)
- "White Wings" (July 1922)
- "Excess Profits" (August 1922)
- "A Musical Treat" (October 1922)
- "A Hole in the Net" (November 1922)
- "Introducing Mr. Pentsymon" (November 1922)
- "A Christmas Capture" (December 1922)
- "The Wings of Chance" (December 1922)
- "An Eye for an Eye" (April 1923)
- "Heavy Metal" (April 1923)
- "The Supreme Test" (April 1923)
- "Sir Jeremiah's Big Shoot" (May 1923)
- "The Odds On Zero" (June 1923)
- "The Morning Glory" (August 1923)
- "A Royal Bag" (December 1923)
- "Early-Closing Day" (April 1924)
- "The Blindworm" (June 1924)
- "A Prize Crop" (August 1924)
- "The Man Who Rang the Bell" (September 1924)
- "When the Moon Set" (December 1924)
- "The Man Who Got Through" (February 1925)
- "A Bootless Errand" (March 1925)
- "In Barkstone Lane" (June 1925)
- "Big Fish" (May 1926)
- "A Christmas in Peril" (December 1926)
- "A Crowning Christmas" (December 1926)
- "The Egg of the Little Auk" (February 1927)
- "Proof Positive" (August 1927)
- "Alias 'James Jones'" (April 1928)
- "Icky Of Oluk Lake" (February 1929)
- "On Peace Night" (May 1929)
- "The Leather-Pushin' Private" (August 1929)
- "A Dog's Life" (January 1930)
- "War Ribbons" (March 1930)
- "His Christmas Gift" (December 1930)
- "Rawhide Science" (December 1930)
- "A Daughter of Nature" (July 1931)
- "And This Is Fame" (October 1931)
- "The Foil" (October 1932)
- "A Christmas Star" (December 1932)
- "The Platinum Chain" (August 1933)
- "Christmas Cards" (December 1933)
- "A Queen in Hiding" (July 1934)
- "The Christmas Carol" (December 1934)
- "The Barrister at Bay" (May 1935)
- "Adventure" (November 1935)
- "The Doll's House" (January 1936)
- "A Sound in the Night" (February 1937)
- "Brayton's Secret" (May 1942)
- "Free Labour" (April 1943)
- "For Love's Sake" (October 1944)
- "One Christmas Eve" (December 1962)
- "The Pawn and the Rook" (March 2011)
- "A Popular Novelist" (November 2011)

==== Uncertain date ====
- The Altar of Sacrifice
- Amaryllis in Mayfair
- A Bid for Fortune
- Blind Luck
- A Christmas Guest
- A Christmas Number
- Cui Bono
- Europe Limited
- The Evolution Of Species
- A Friendly Lead (Pearson's Mag. v. 13, 1892)
- From Out The Past
- The Gods Of Chance
- A Good Likeness
- The Heartstone
- Hero Worship
- Hide And Seek
- An Honoured Guest
- The King Of The Poachers
- The King's Pavilion
- The Last Gasp
- Leaves From A Log Book
- The Legend Of The Big Boot
- The Lord's Anointed
- The Luck Of The Hawkes
- A Man Who Goes To His Club
- Marked Cards
- The Millionaire Who Begged
- A Morning Call
- The Mother-In-Law
- My Lady's Diamonds
- Nearly Lost
- Number 89276
- The Obvious Way
- On The Off Chance
- The Pensioner
- A Perfect Treasure
- The Picture Of The Year
- A Question Of Degree
- A Real Queen
- Red Ruin
- The Secretaire
- The Slave Of The Lamp
- The Spur Of The Moment
- The Strike Of '7
- A Stronger Suit
- The Things That Might Be
- A Touch Of Nature
- The Triumph Of Democracy
- The Two Spaniards
- The Very Newest Journalism
- The White Terror
- White Wine
- Who Killed James Trent
- The Woman And Her Way
- The Courage Of Despair (1910?)
- A Captious Critic (May 1895?)
