= Henry – Fisherman =

1949 Caldecott picture book

- 1st edition
- Author: Marcia Brown
- Illustrator: Marcia Brown
- Publisher: Scribner
- Publication date: 1949
- Pages: unpaged
- Awards: Caldecott Honor

Henry – Fisherman: A Story of the Virgin Islands is a 1949 picture book written and illustrated by Marcia Brown. Growing up on St. Thomas, Henry wants to be a fisherman. The book was a recipient of a 1950 Caldecott Honor for its illustrations.
