= Puss in Boots (Brown book) =

1952 Caldecott picture book

- Author: Marcia Brown
- Publisher: Scribner
- Publication date: 1952
- Pages: unpaged
- Awards: Caldecott Honor

Puss in Boots is a 1952 picture book translated and illustrated by Marcia Brown. The book is a translation of Charles Perrault's Puss in Boots. The book was a recipient of a 1953 Caldecott Honor for its illustrations.
