= Nicholas: A Manhattan Christmas Story =

Children's fantasy novel by Annie Carroll Moore

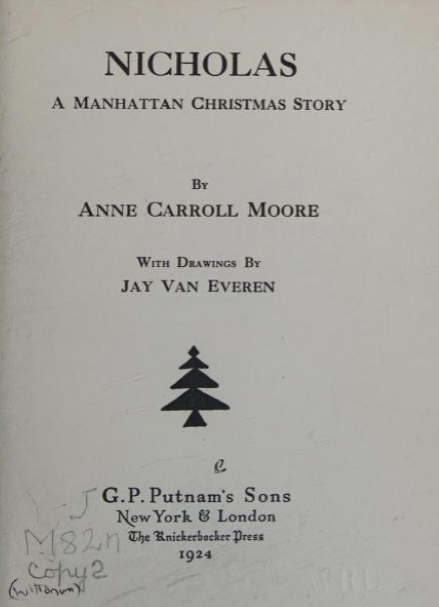
- Title page for Nicholas: A Manhattan Christmas Story (1924)
- Author: Anne Carroll Moore
- Illustrator: Jay Van Everen
- Language: English
- Genre: Children's fantasy
- Publisher: G. P. Putnam's Sons
- Publication date: 1924
- Publication place: United States
- Pages: 331

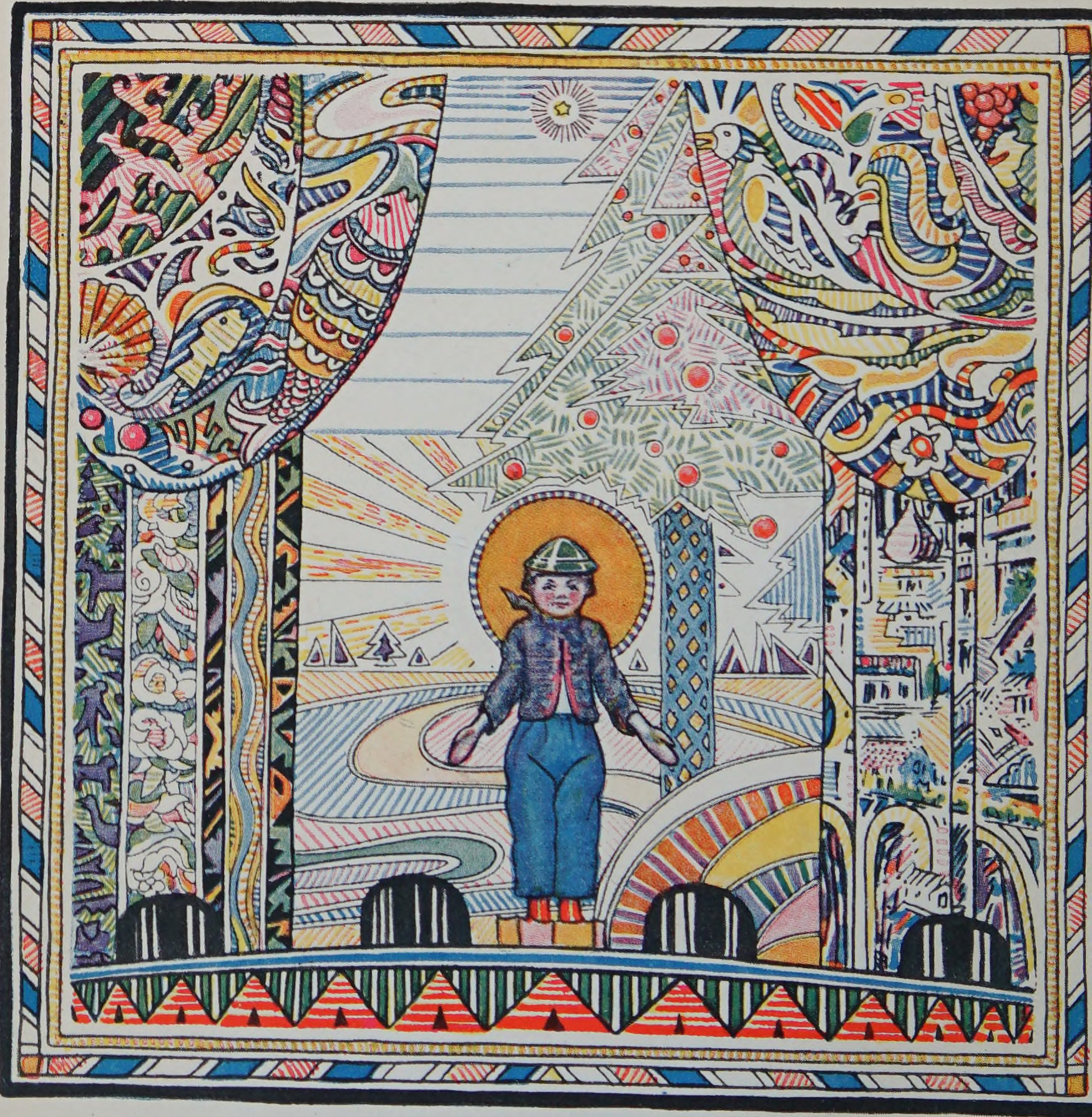
Frontispiece for the novel, illustrated by Jay Van Everen.

Nicholas: A Manhattan Christmas Story is a 1924 children's fantasy novel written by Anne Carroll Moore and illustrated by Jay Van Everen. The story follows eight-inch-tall Nicholas from Holland on a tour of the sights of New York and recounts his encounters with many famous people, fictional characters, and magical beings. The novel, illustrated by Jay Van Everen, was a Newbery Honor recipient in 1925.
