= Truce of the Wolf and Other Tales of Old Italy =

1931 book

- Author: Mary Gould Davis
- Illustrator: Jay Van Everen
- Language: English
- Genre: Children's literature / Mythology
- Publisher: Harcourt
- Publication date: 1931
- Publication place: United States

Truce of the Wolf and Other Tales of Old Italy is a 1931 children's collection of seven Italian folklore stories written by Mary Gould Davis and illustrated by Jan Van Everen. Six of the stories are retellings of existing stories, including the legend of Saint Francis of Assisi and a story from the Decameron; in the seventh, The Tale of Nanni, an intelligent donkey helps a shoemaker aid an injured priest. The book earned a Newbery Honor in 1931.
