= Tod of the Fens =

1928 book by Elinor Whitney Field

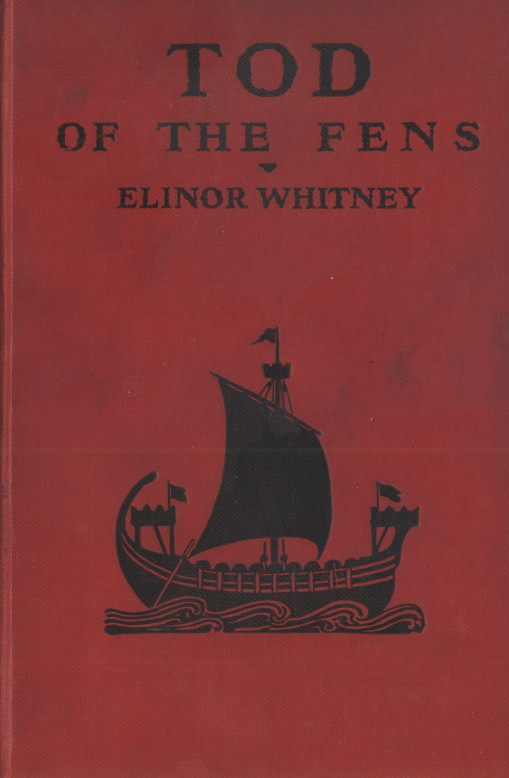
- Front cover
- Author: Elinor Whitney Field
- Illustrator: Warwick Goble
- Language: English
- Genre: Children's literature / Historical fiction
- Publisher: Macmillan
- Publication date: 1928
- Publication place: United States
- Pages: 239

Tod of the Fens is a 1928 children's historical fiction novel written by Elinor Whitney Field and illustrated by Warwick Goble. Set in Boston, England, in the early fifteenth century, it is a light-hearted adventure about Tod, a boy who lives with a band of men outside town, and Prince Hal, the heir to the throne, who disguises himself so he can move among the people incognito. The novel was a Newbery Honor recipient in 1929.
