= Skipper John's Cook =

1952 Caldecott picture book

- Author: Marcia Brown
- Publisher: Charles Scribner
- Publication date: 1951
- Pages: unpaged
- Awards: Caldecott Honor

Skipper John's Cook is a 1951 picture book written and illustrated by Marcia Brown. The story tells of a boy who is a cook on a boat. The book was a recipient of a 1952 Caldecott Honor for its illustrations.
