= Frederic G. Melcher =

American bookseller, publisher, editor (1879–1963)

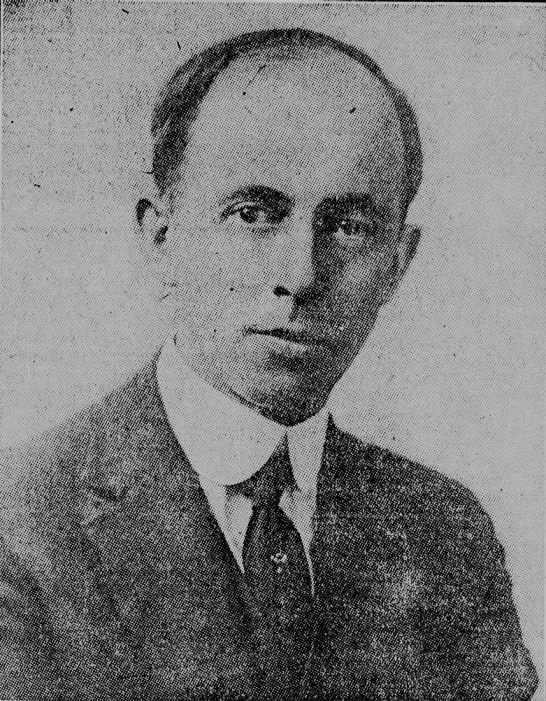
- Born: April 12, 1879; Malden
- Died: March 9, 1963; Montclair
- Occupations: Opinion writer, editor, publisher
- Employer: R. R. Bowker

Frederic Gershom Melcher (April 12, 1879 – March 9, 1963) was an American publisher, bookseller, editor, and a major contributor to the library science field and book industry. He is particularly known for his contributions to the children's book genre, including the Newbery Medal and Caldecott Medal. Melcher was named as one of the most important 100 leaders in the library science field of the 20th century in an American Libraries article and has been described as "the greatest all-round bookman in the English-speaking world".

Melcher was born in 1879 in Malden, Massachusetts, a suburb on the north side of Boston. In 1883, the family moved to Newton Center, another Boston suburb. A 1945 essay describes his childhood growing up near a lake, fishing, ice skating and swimming. He was also an avid reader from a young age, making many visits to the library, as well as enjoying books passed on or given by friends and family.

== Bookstores and bookmen ==
At the age of 16, Melcher's grandfather helped him to secure a job at Estes and Lauriat publishing company and bookstore in Boston. Melcher began his career in the book industry there, a career which would span 68 years. He began working in the mailroom and over the next 18 years worked his way into sales and acquisitions.

It was during his time at Estes and Lauriat that he first developed his interest in children's books. He worked to develop the children's collection of the books store with help of Caroline Hewins, a New England librarian who also had interests in developing and promoting children's books. He later established The Caroline M. Hewins Lectureship on New England children's books in 1947. In 1910, he married Marguerite Fellows, an author of children's books. In 1912, Melcher became president of the Boston Booksellers League. He was very active in the Boston book trade and was described as "an energetic and agreeable bookseller who knew books thoroughly." His reputation as an enthusiastic and knowledgeable salesman resulted in his recommendation for a position running the W.K. Stewart Bookstore in Indianapolis, Indiana, in 1913.

During his five years in Indiana, Melcher managed the W.K. Stewart Bookstore, which survived a flood but not a later fire which resulted in a total loss of the store and a new location. He was also active in the Indiana Public Libraries Association and promoted material relating regional history.

He was with R.R. Bowker for 45 years, starting in 1918 and becoming president in 1934. While at Publishers Weekly, Melcher began creating space in the publication and a number of issues dedicated solely to books for children. In 1919, he teamed with Franklin K. Mathiews, librarian for the Boy Scouts of America, and Anne Carroll Moore, a librarian at the New York Public Library, to create Children's Book Week.

Melcher proposed the Newbery Medal in 1922, an annual award for "the most distinguished book for children". Melcher suggested that the award be named after John Newbery, a British bookseller known for his contributions to the children's book industry. Melcher recruited Rene Paul Chambellan to design the award. Although the award had hearty support, Melcher also drew extensively upon his own funds for the creation of the medal.

Melcher proposed the Caldecott Medal in 1937 to honor children's picture books. Named for British illustrator Randolph Caldecott, the medal is presented annually for the "most distinguished picture book for children".

In 1945, Melcher had worked in the book industry for 50 years. A celebration was held in his honor at the Waldorf-Astoria Hotel in New York City.

Melcher was awarded American Library Association Honorary Membership in 1945. A collection of essays about his life was published to commemorate this event and he was awarded a medal from The American Institute of Graphic Arts:

In recognition of his many-sided contributions to the Graphic Arts through 50 years, his patient and judicial sponsorship of worthy causes, international as well as national; his continuing kindly encouragement of young men and women first entering the world of books; and his tireless, accomplished, and successful efforts to make known and to maintain high standards of bookmaking.

Melcher resigned as president of R.R. Bowker in 1958 to become chairman of the board. In 1962 he received the Regina Medal from the Catholic Library Association "in recognition of a lifetime contribution to children's literature".

== Religious ties ==
Melcher was an active member in the Unitarian Universalist church. His contributions to the church and to the publishing industry, as well as his work in fighting against censorship led to the church establishing the Frederic G. Melcher Book Award in 1964. The award is given annually to the work "judged to have made the most significant contribution to religious liberalism".

== Other interests ==
Although Melcher is best known for his contributions to the world of children's books, he was also known as being foremost among his contemporaries for his comprehensive understanding of the entire book industry, including bookselling, publishing and libraries. He was also active in supporting and developing the international book trade, fighting against censorship and working toward international copyright laws.

== Friendship with Frost ==
Melcher is also known for his friendship with American poet Robert Frost. The University of Virginia Library is home to the Frederic G. Melcher–Robert Frost Collection, which covers various photos and writings from the two men from 1865 to 1963. In 2006, a University of Virginia graduate student who was completing a thesis on the poetry of Frost discovered a previously unpublished poem, inscribed by Frost on the inside cover of a book Frost had given to Melcher in 1918.

== Death ==
Melcher died on March 9, 1963, at the age of 83, and his ashes were scattered at the family vacation home in Cape Cod. After his death, much of his work and sponsorship of several awards was carried on by his son Daniel.
