= Marcia Brown =

American children's illustrator and writer (1918–2015)

- Born: Marcia Joan Brown; July 13, 1918; Rochester, New York, U.S.
- Died: April 28, 2015 (aged 96); Laguna Hills, California, U.S.
- Occupations: Writer, illustrator
- Writing career
- Genre: Children's literature
- Notable awards: Caldecott Medal; 1955 Cinderella, or the Little Glass Slipper; 1962 Once a Mouse; 1983 Shadow; Regina Medal 1977; Children's Literature Legacy Award 1992

Marcia Joan Brown (July 13, 1918 – April 28, 2015) was an American writer and illustrator of more than 30 children's books. She won three annual Caldecott Medals from the American Library Association, six Caldecott Medal honors as an illustrator, recognizing the year's best U.S. picture book illustration, and the ALA's Children's Literature Legacy Award in 1992 for her career contribution to children's literature. This total of nine books with awards and honors is more than any other Caldecott-nominated illustrator. Many of her titles have been published in translation, including Afrikaans, German, Japanese, Spanish, and Xhosa-Bantu editions. Brown is known as one of the most honored illustrators in children's literature.

== Life ==
Brown was born on July 13, 1918, in Rochester, New York. She enrolled in the New York State College for Teachers, predecessor to the University at Albany. She taught at Cornwall High School in Cornwall, New York. Brown left teaching to work in the New York Public Library's Central Children's Room. Her first book was The Little Carousel, a 32-page picture book that she both wrote and illustrated, published by Scribner's in 1946.

Brown lived with her companion Janet Loranger, who was also her editor. Brown died on April 28, 2015, in Laguna Hills, California; she was 96 years old.

== Awards ==
For her contribution as a children's illustrator, Brown was U.S. nominee in both 1966 and 1976 for the biennial, international Hans Christian Andersen Award, the highest international recognition available to creators of children's books. She received the 1977 Regina Medal from the Catholic Libraries Association for "continued, distinguished contribution to children's literature without regard to the nature of the contribution" and the 1992 Children's Literature Legacy Award from the American Library Association for "substantial and lasting contributions to children's literature"; it was then conferred every three years.

Brown received the Distinguished Alumni Award from the SUNY Albany Alumni Association (1969), the Distinguished Service to Children's Literature Award from the University of Southern Mississippi (1972), and the Regina Medal from the Catholic Library Association for service to children's literature (1977).

From 1955 to 1983, Brown won three Caldecott Medals, the annual American Library Association award to the illustrator of the year's "most distinguished American picture book for children" (only David Wiesner has also won three). Her books have been named Honor Books six times from 1947 to 1954.

== Selected works ==
Caldecott Medal winners

- Cinderella, or the Little Glass Slipper, 1954
- Once a Mouse, 1961
- Shadow, 1982

Caldecott Honor finalist

- Stone Soup: An Old Tale, 1947
- Henry Fisherman, 1949
- Dick Whittington and his Cat, 1950
- Skipper John's Cook,1951
- Puss in Boots, 1952
- The Steadfast Tin Soldier, 1953
