= Warwick Goble =

British illustrator (1862–1943)

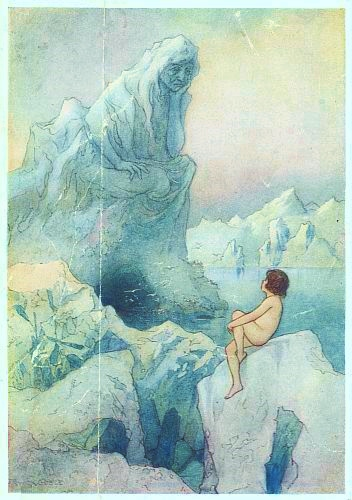
An illustration for The Water Babies

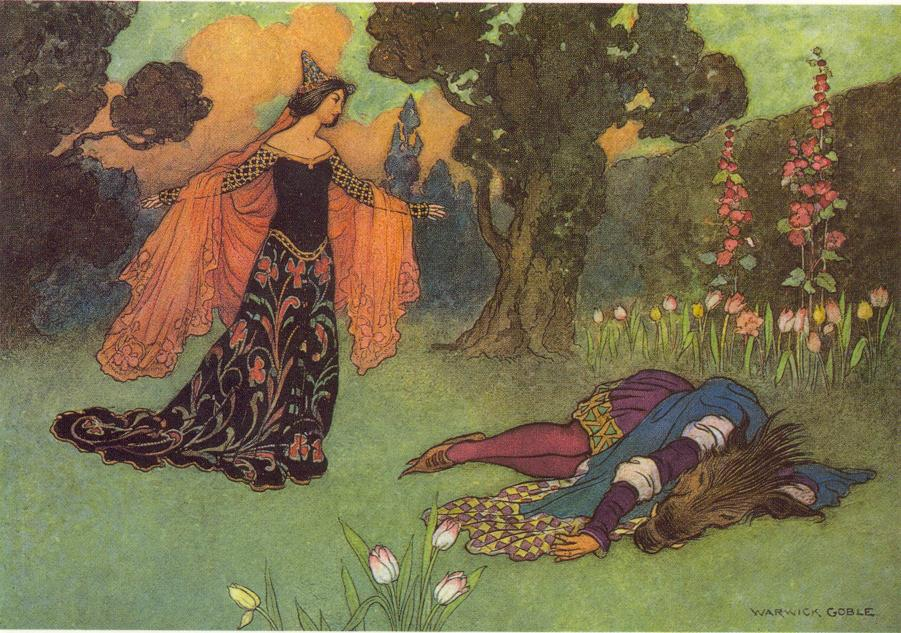
An illustration for Beauty and the Beast

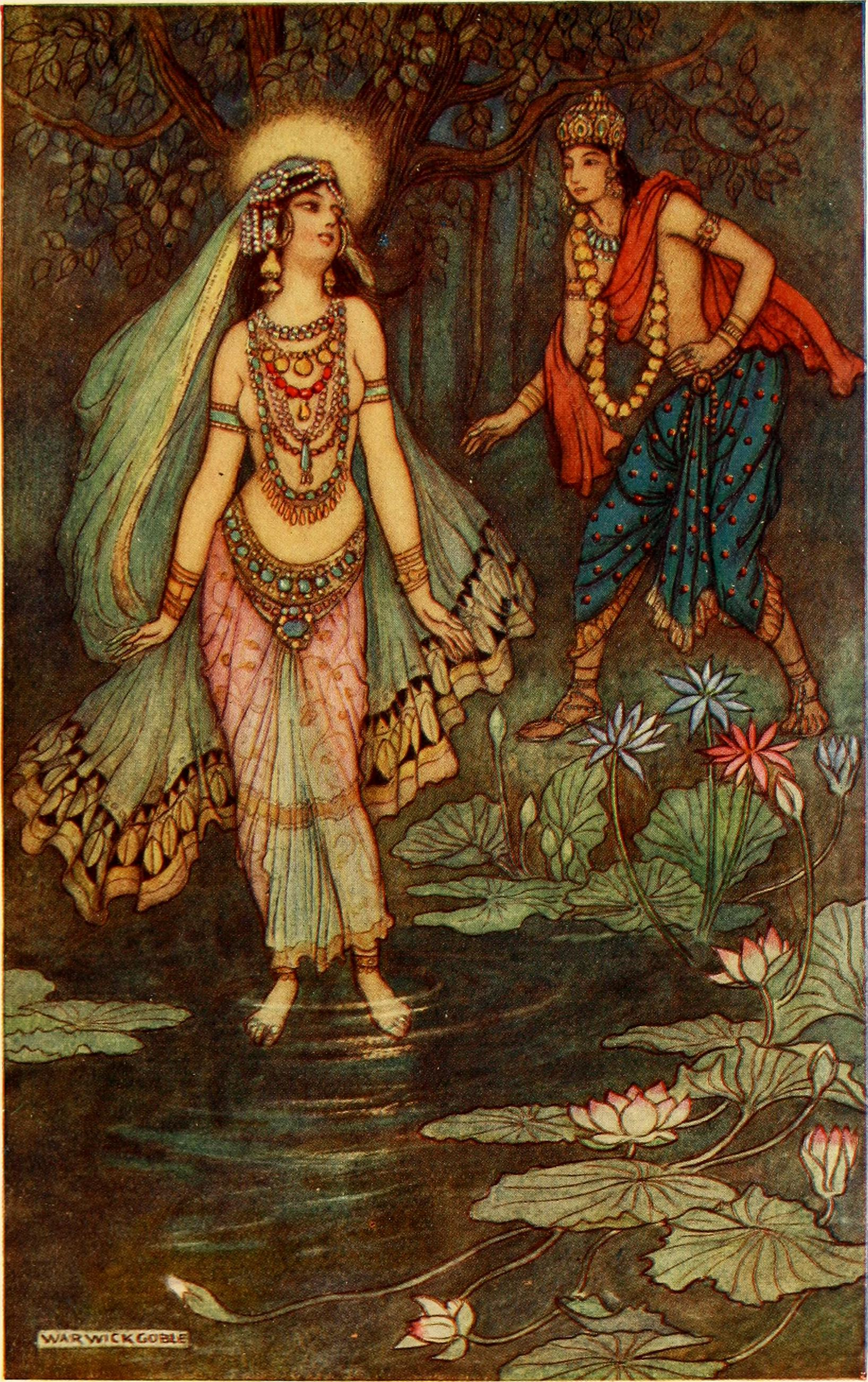
Shantanu meets Goddess Ganga, 1913

Warwick Goble (22 November 1862 – 22 January 1943) was a British illustrator.

He was educated and trained at the City of London School and the Westminster School of Art. He specialized in fairy tales and exotic scenes from Japan, India and Arabia. He illustrated H. G. Wells' The War of the Worlds – among his first published illustrations, soon to be followed by a suite for The Book of Baal. He also provided illustrations for magazines, including Pearson's Magazine, illustrating a number of early science-fiction stories, including several by Frederick Merrick White.

== Selected works ==
Books illustrated:

- Samuel Rutherford Crockett, Lad's Love (Bliss Sands, 1897)
- H. G. Wells, The War of The Worlds (Heinemann, 1898)
- Mrs. Molesworth, The Grim House (Nisbet, 1899)
- Alexander van Millingen, Constantinople (Black, 1906)
- Francis A. Gasquet, The Greater Abbeys of England (Chatto, 1908)
- Jane Barlow, Irish Ways (Allen, 1909)
- Charles Kingsley, The Water Babies (MacMillan, 1909)
- Grace James, Green Willow and Other Japanese Fairy Tales (MacMillan, 1910)
- Giambattista Basile, Stories from the Pentamerone (MacMillan, 1911)
- The Modern Reader's Chaucer (MacMillan, 1912)
- Lal Behari Dey, Folk-Tales of Bengal (MacMillan, 1912)
- Dinah Craik, The Fairy Book (MacMillan, 1913)
- D. A. MacKenzie, Indian Myth and Legend (Gresham, 1913)
- Dinah Craik, John Halifax, Gentleman (OUP, 1914)
- Cornelia Sorabji, Indian Tales of The Great Ones (1916)
- J. S. Fletcher, The Cistercians in Yorkshire (SPCK, 1919)
- W. G. Stables, Young Peggy McQueen (Collins)
- D. Owen, The Book of Fairy Poetry (Longmans, 1920)
- Robert Louis Stevenson, Treasure Island (MacMillan, 1923)
- Robert Louis Stevenson, Kidnapped (MacMillan, 1925)
- Washington Irving, Tales of the Alhambra (MacMillan, 1926)
- Elinor Whitney Field, Tod of the Fens (Macmillan, 1928)

Goble contributed to these and other periodical publications.

- The Boy's Own Paper
- The Captain – for boys
- The Illustrated London News
- Little Folks – for children
- The Minister
- The Pall Mall Gazette
- Pearson's Magazine
- The Strand Magazine
- The Westminster Gazette
- The Wide World Magazine
- Windsor Magazine
