= Augusta Braxton Baker =

American librarian and storyteller

- Born: April 1, 1911; Baltimore, Maryland, U.S.
- Died: February 23, 1998 (aged 86); Columbia, South Carolina, U.S.

Augusta Braxton Baker (April 1, 1911 – February 23, 1998) was an American librarian and storyteller. She was known for her contributions to children's literature, especially regarding the portrayal of Black Americans in works for children.

== Early life and education ==
Augusta Braxton Baker was born on April 1, 1911, in Baltimore, Maryland. Both of her parents were schoolteachers, who instilled in her a love of reading. During the day while her parents worked, her grandmother, Augusta Fax (from whom she received her name) cared for her and told her stories. Baker delighted in these stories, carrying her love for them throughout her life. She learned to read before starting elementary school, later enrolling in the (racially segregated) Black high school where her father taught, and graduating at the age of 16. Baker then entered the University of Pittsburgh, where she both met and married James Baker by the end of her sophomore year.

Relocating with her husband to New York, Baker sought to transfer to Albany Teacher's College (now the State University of New York at Albany), only to be met with racial opposition from the college. Eleanor Roosevelt, the wife of Franklin Roosevelt (who was then the Governor of New York), was on the board of the Albany Interracial Council (now the Albany Urban League). Mrs. Roosevelt heavily advocated for Baker's transfer. Though the college did not want to admit Black people, they also did not want to oppose the governor's wife, and Baker was admitted. While there, she aimed toward a different career and wrote, "I discovered I loved books, but I didn't love teaching." She completed her education there, earning a B.A. degree in education in 1933 and a B.S. in library science in 1934. She became the first African-American to earn a master's degree in librarianship from the college.

== Professional career ==
After graduation, Baker taught for a few years, until she was hired in 1937 as the children's librarian at the New York Public Library's 135th Street Branch (now the Countee Cullen Regional Branch) in Harlem. Baker applied three times before the head of children's services, Anne Carroll Moore, took a personal interest in her application. Moore later berated the director of the library for not passing along the application, as she was interested in anyone who showed an affinity for children's work. During her time at this branch, Baker played an integral part in teaching Audre Lorde how to read.

In 1939, the branch began an effort to find and collect children's literature that portrayed Black people as something other than "servile buffoons," speaking in a rude dialect, and other such stereotypes. This collection, founded by Baker as the James Weldon Johnson Memorial Collection of Children's Books, led to the publication of the first of a number of bibliographies of books for and about Black children. Baker furthered this project by encouraging authors, illustrators, and publishers to produce, as well as libraries to acquire, books depicting Black people in a favorable light.

In 1953, she was appointed Storytelling Specialist and Assistant Coordinator of Children's Services. Not long after that, she became Coordinator of Children's Services in 1961, becoming the first African-American librarian in an administrative position in the New York Public Library (NYPL). In this role, she oversaw children's programs in the entire NYPL system and set policies for them. During this time, Baker also figured prominently in the American Library Association's Children's Services Division (now the Association for Library Service to Children), having served as its president. Additionally, she chaired the committee that awarded the Newbery Medal and the Caldecott Medal. Furthermore, Baker influenced many children's authors and illustrators—such as Maurice Sendak, Madeleine L'Engle, Ezra Jack Keats, and John Steptoe—while in this position. She also worked as a consultant for the then newly created children's television series Sesame Street.

In 1946, she published an extensive bibliography of titles relating to the Black experience titled Books about Negro Life for Children. In a 1943 article, Baker stated her criteria for selection. The books included should be ones "that give an unbiased, accurate, well rounded picture of Negro life in all parts of the world." The lists and the standards were freely distributed from 135th Street Branch in Harlem. Many librarians, editors, and authors of the time used the lists in conjunction with their own work. In 1971, it was retitled The Black Experience in Children's Books, and its criteria played an important part in bringing awareness about harmful stereotypes in Helen Bannerman's The Story of Little Black Sambo.

In 1974, Baker retired from the New York Public Library. However, in 1980, she returned to librarianship to assume the newly created Storyteller-in-Residence position at the University of South Carolina; this was also the first such position in any American university at the time. She remained there until her second retirement in 1994. During her time there, Baker co-wrote Storytelling: Art and Technique with Ellin Greene. The book was first published in 1977, with a second edition appearing in 1987.

== Death and continued legacy ==
After a long illness, Baker died at the age of 86 on February 23, 1998. Her legacy has remained even today, particularly through the "Baker's Dozen: A Celebration of Stories" annual storytelling festival. Sponsored by the University of South Carolina College of Information and Communications and the Richland County Public Library, this festival originated in 1987 during Baker's time at the university, and is celebrated still to this day. The College of Information and Communications also created an endowed chair bearing Baker's name in 2011. In 2019, Dr. Nicole A. Cooke was appointed the Augusta Baker Endowment Chair.

When asked: "What do you tell your students when you conduct your workshops?" Baker stated:

"I tell them what I've always said. Let the story tell itself, and if it is a good story and you have prepared it well, you do not need all the extras – the costumes, the histrionics, the high drama. Children of all ages do want to hear stories. Select well, prepare well, and then go forth, stand tall, and just tell."

Her legacy also continues through the Augusta Baker Collection of Children's Literature and Folklore at the University of South Carolina. The collection, donated by her son, James H. Baker III, contains over 1,600 children's books, including materials from her personal and working library, as well as papers, illustrations, and anthologies of folktales Baker used during her career.

In 2024, Penguin Random House published Go Forth and Tell: The Life of Augusta Baker, Librarian and Master Storyteller, a children's book chronicling her background and career. It was illustrated by April Harrison and written by Breanna J. McDaniel.

Baker advanced the long Black freedom struggle through her community outreach, bibliographic work, scholarly publications, collection development, and storytelling.

== Awards and honors ==
- First recipient of the E.P. Dutton-John Macrae Award (1953)
- Parents Magazine Medal Award (1966)
- American Library Association Grolier Award (1968)
- Women's National Book Association, Constance Lindsay Skinner Award (1971)
- Clarence Day Award (1975)
- American Library Association Honorary Membership (1975)
- Honorary Doctorate from St. John's University (1980)
- Catholic Library Association Regina Medal (1981)
- Honorary Doctorate from the University of South Carolina (1986)
- Second recipient of Association for Library Service to Children Distinguished Service Award (1993)

== Bibliography ==
From Janice M. Del Negro, former Editor of The Bulletin for Children's Books:

- Baker, Augusta. 1955. Talking tree; fairy tales from 15 lands. Illus. by Johannes Troyer. Philadelphia, PA: J.B. Lippincott.
- Courlander, Harold. 1956. Uncle Bouqui, folk tales from Haiti; from Uncle Bouqui of Haiti. Read by Augusta Baker. Sound recording. Washington, DC: Folkways Records.
- Baker, Augusta. 1957. Books about Negro life for children. New York, NY: New York Public Library.
- Baker, Augusta, ed. 1960. Golden lynx, and other tales. Illus. by Johannes Troyer. Philadelphia, PA: J.B. Lippincott.
- Baker, Augusta, ed. 1960. Young years; best loved stories and poems for little children. New York, NY: Parents' Magazine Educational Press; Home Library Press.
- Baker, Augusta. 1961. Books about Negro life for children. New York, NY: New York Public Library.
- Baker, Augusta. 1963. Books about Negro life for children. New York, NY: New York Public Library.
- Baker, Augusta. 1963. Young years library. New York, NY: Parents' Magazine Educational Press.
- Baker, Augusta, et al. 1966. Come hither!: papers on children's literature and librarianship. Los Angeles, CA: Yeasayers Press.
- Baker, Augusta. 1967. Aids to choosing books for children. New York, NY: Children's Book Council.
- Rollins, Charlemae Hill. 1967. We build together; a reader's guide to Negro life and literature for elementary and high school use. With contributions from Augusta Baker, et al. Champaign, IL: National Council of Teachers of English.
- Baker, Augusta, ed. 1971. Black experience in children's books. Cover design by Ezra Jack Keats. New York, NY: New York Public Library.
- Baker, Augusta. 1975. Storytelling. Cassette recording. New York, Children's Book Council.
- Baker, Augusta and Ellin Greene. 1977. Storytelling: art and technique. New York, NY: R. R. Bowker.
- Baker, Augusta and Ellin Greene. 1987. Storytelling: art and technique, 2nd ed. New York, NY: R. R. Bowker.
- Greene, Ellin. 1996. Storytelling: art and technique. With a foreword by Augusta Baker. New York, NY: R. R. Bowker.
