= Joseph Alexander Altsheler =

American writer & novelist (1862–1919)

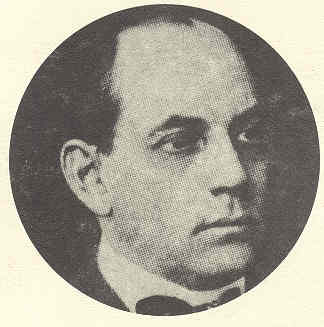
- Born: April 29, 1862; Three Springs, Hart County, Kentucky, U.S.
- Died: June 5, 1919 (aged 57); New York City, New York, U.S.
- Resting place: Cave Hill Cemetery; Louisville, Kentucky, U.S.
- Education: Liberty College; Vanderbilt University
- Occupation: Novelist
- Spouse: Sarah Boles (m. 1888)
- Children: 1
- Writing career
- Period: 1896–1919

Joseph Alexander Altsheler (April 29, 1862 – June 5, 1919) was an American newspaper reporter, editor, and author of popular juvenile historical fiction. He was a prolific writer, and produced fifty novels and at least fifty-three short stories. Thirty-two of his novels were part of his seven series:

- The Civil War Series (8 volumes)
- The French and Indian War Series (6 volumes)
- The Gold Series (2 volumes)
- The Great West Series (2 volumes)
- The Texan Series (3 volumes)
- The World War Series (3 volumes)
- The Young Trailers Series (8 volumes)

== Early life and education ==
Altsheler was born in Three Springs, Hart County, Kentucky, to Joseph and Louise (née Snoddy) Altsheler. He attended Liberty College in Glasgow, Kentucky, before entering Vanderbilt University.

== Career ==
In 1885, he took a job at the Louisville Courier-Journal as a reporter and later worked as an editor. He started working for the New York World in 1892, first as the paper's Hawaiian correspondent and then as the editor of the World's tri-weekly magazine. Due to a lack of suitable stories, he began writing children's stories for the magazine.

== Personal life ==
Altsheler married Sarah Boles on May 30, 1888; they had one son, Sidney.

Altsheler and his family were in Germany in 1914 when World War I began, and they were forced to remain in Germany for a time. The hardships the family endured in returning to the U.S. damaged Altsheler's health and rendered him a semi-invalid until his death. Upon returning to the U.S., he wrote The World War Series of books based on his ordeal.

== Death ==
Altsheler died in New York City on June 5, 1919, aged 57; his obituary appeared in The Evening World, on June 6, 1919. His widow, Sarah, died 30 years later. Both are buried at the Cave Hill Cemetery in Louisville, Kentucky.

== Bibliography ==
The novels in each of Altsheler's seven series are numbered to indicate the intended reading order, although each novel tells an independent story. His eighteen standalone novels are unnumbered. A Knight of Philadelphia was later expanded with nineteen additional chapters and minor revisions to become In Hostile Red.

=== The Gold Series ===
- V1 The Rainbow of Gold (1898)
- V2 The Hidden Mine (1896)

=== The Young Trailers Series ===
- V1 The Young Trailers, a story of early Kentucky (1907)
- V2 The Forest Runners, a story of the great war trail in early Kentucky (1908)
- V3 The Keepers of the Trail, a story of the great woods (1916)
- V4 The Eyes of the Woods, a story of the ancient wilderness (1917)
- V5 The Free Rangers, a story of the early days along the Mississippi (1909)
- V6 The Riflemen of the Ohio, a story of early days along "the beautiful river" (1910)
- V7 The Scouts of the Valley, a story of Wyoming and the Chemung (1911)
- V8 The Border Watch, a story of the great chief's last stand (1912)

=== The French and Indian War Series ===
- V1 The Hunters of the Hills, a story of the French and Indian War (1916)
- V2 The Shadow of the North, a story of old New York and a lost campaign (1917)
- V3 The Rulers of the Lakes, a story of George and Champlain (1917)
- V4 The Masters of the Peaks, a story of the great north woods (1918)
- V5 The Lords of the Wild, a story of the old New York border (1919)
- V6 The Sun of Quebec, a story of a great crisis (1919)

=== The Texan Series ===
- V1 The Texan Star, the story of a great fight for liberty (1912)
- V2 The Texan Scouts, the story of the Alamo and Goliad (1913)
- V3 The Texan Triumph, a romance of the San Jacinto campaign (1913)

=== The Civil War Series ===
- V1 The Guns of Bull Run, a story of the Civil War's eve (1914)
- V2 The Guns of Shiloh, a story of the great western campaign (1914)
- V3 The Scouts of Stonewall, the story of the great valley campaign (1914)
- V4 The Sword of Antietam, a story of the nation's crisis (1914)
- V5 The Star of Gettysburg, a story of southern high tide (1915)
- V6 The Rock of Chickamauga, a story of the western crisis (1915)
- V7 The Shades of the Wilderness, a story of Lee's great stand (1916)
- V8 The Tree of Appomattox, a story of the Civil War's close (1916)

=== The Great West Series ===
- V1 The Great Sioux Trail, a story of mountain and plain (1918)
- V2 The Lost Hunters, a story of wild man and great beasts (1918)

=== The World War Series ===
- V1 The Guns of Europe (1915)
- V2 The Forest of Swords, a story of Paris and the Marne (1915)
- V3 The Hosts of the Air, the story of a quest in the Great War (1915)

=== Other novels ===
- A Knight of Philadelphia (1897)
- A Soldier of Manhattan, and his adventures at Ticonderoga and Quebec (1897)
- The Sun of Saratoga, a romance of Burgoyne's surrender (1897)
- A Herald of the West, an American story of 1811-1815 (1898)
- In Circling Camps, a romance of the Civil War (1900)
- In Hostile Red, a romance of the Monmouth campaign (1900)
- The Last Rebel (1900)
- The Wilderness Road; a romance of St. Clair's defeat and Wayne's victory (1901)
- My Captive, an adventure of the British Legion (1902)
- Before the Dawn, a story of the fall of Richmond (1903)
- Guthrie of the Times, a story of success (1904)
- The Candidate, a political romance (1905)
- The Changing Order (1907)
- The Recovery, a story of Kentucky (1908)
- The Last of the Chiefs, a story of the great Sioux war (1909)
- The Horsemen of the Plains, a story of the great Cheyenne war (1910)
- The Quest of the Four, story of the Comanches and Buena Vista (1911)
- Apache Gold, a story of the strange Southwest (1913)

=== Short stories (in chronological order by publication date) ===
- The Break of Day (September 1895)
- The Sharpshooter (June 1896)
- A Spy of France (July 1896)
- A Visitor from Kentucky (October 9, 1896)
- At the Cannon's Mouth (January 13, 1897)
- Old Tom of Nantucket (February 1897)
- My Pennsylvanian (May 1897)
- The General (October 9, 1897)
- A Problem of the East (November 1897)
- The Red Light (December 1897)
- The Indian Scout (February 19, 1898)
- After the Battle (March 1898)
- Guard No. 10 (September 1898)
- At the Twelfth Hour (October 1898)
- Mercer's Best Shot (November 1898)
- The Stroke of Midnight (December 11, 1898)
- A Plot for a Crown (1899)
- Black Feather's Throw (March 25, 1899)
- The Story of a Goose (August 10, 1899)
- A Touch of Nature (May 25, 1901)
- A Generation After (May 26, 1901)
- Dan Mason's Christmas (December 21, 1901)
- His Greatest Speech (June 1902)
- The Fate of the Gun (July 4, 1902)
- The Governor's Choice (August 1902)
- The Breath of Pélé (April 1903)
- The Escape (June 6, 1903)
- A Dawn in the Desert (July 25, 1903)
- Prince Kailulino (August 1903)
- The Man from Maui (August 1903)
- Jimmy Grayson's Spell (August 15, 1903)
- The Third Degree (August 22, 1903)
- The Wedding Guest (October 1903)
- A Dead City (October 24, 1903)
- Old Manson's Sin (November 1903)
- The Island Chute (December 12, 1903)
- The Spellbinder (October 29, 1904)
- The Retreat of the Ten (November 1904)
- The Lost Herd (April 1905)
- The Broken Journey (December 1905)
- The Stolen Speech (April 1906)
- The Phantom Foursome (May 1906)
- Carson's Victory (September 1906)
- The Insistence of Fleming (February 1907)
- Justice Intervenes (March 1907)
- A Deal with the Prosecution (April 1907)
- The Silent Stranger (May 1907)
- The Last Call (June 1907)
- A Case of Restraint (June 1908)
- The Lone Huntsman (October 1908)
- How Carroll Came Home (October 15, 1911)
- Bobby's Twilight Dance (February 1914)
- In Sheep's Clothing (February 1919)

=== Re-Issues ===
In 2019, Neo Books compiled four books as

- "Joseph Altsheler collection. Vol. 1, Four Revolutionary War novels". It includes "Son of Saratoga, a romance of Burgoyne's surrender", "In Hostile Red, a romance of the Monmouth campaign", "My Captive” (retitled as "My Captive, a tale of Tarleton's Raiders"), "Wilderness Road, a romance of St. Clair's defeat and Wayne's victory"
