= Elinor Whitney Field =

American children's book author

Elinor Whitney Field (1889–1980) was an American writer of children's books. Her book Tod of the Fens was published in 1928 and was the recipient of a Newbery Honor. She and Bertha Mahony founded The Horn Book Magazine, the oldest U.S magazine dedicated to reviewing children's literature.

== Works ==
- Tyke-y: His Book and His Mark
- Tod of the Fens (1928)
- Realms of gold in children's books (1929) (with Bertha Mahony)
- Contemporary illustrators of children's books (1930) (with Betha Mahony)
- Try all ports, 1933
- Five Years of Children's Books (1936) (with Betha Mahony)
- Illustrators of Children's Books, 1744-1945 (1947)
- Writing and Criticism: A Book for Margery Bianco (1951)
- Newbery medal books, 1922-1955, with their author's acceptance papers & related material chiefly from the Horn book magazine (1955) (with Bertha Mahony)
- Caldecott medal books, 1938-1957, with the artists' acceptance papers & related material chiefly from the Horn book magazine (1957) (with Bertha Mahony)
- Horn book reflections on children's books and reading; selected from eighteen years of the Horn book magazine, 1949-1966 (1969)
