= The Horn Book Magazine =

Children's literature magazine

- Editor: Roger Sutton
- Frequency: Bimonthly
- Founder: Bertha Mahony Miller and Elinor Whitney Field
- Founded: 1924
- Company: Media Source Inc.
- Country: United States
- Based in: Boston
- Language: English
- Website: www.hbook.com
- ISSN: 0018-5078

The Horn Book Magazine, founded in Boston in 1924, is the oldest bimonthly magazine dedicated to reviewing children's literature. It began as a "suggestive purchase list" prepared by Bertha Mahony and Elinor Whitney Field, proprietors of the country's first bookstore for children, The Bookshop for Boys and Girls. Opened in 1916 in Boston as a project of the Women's Educational and Industrial Union, the bookshop closed in 1936, but The Horn Book Magazine continues in its mission to "blow the horn for fine books for boys and girls" as Mahony wrote in her first editorial.

In each issue (every other month), The Horn Book Magazine includes articles about issues and trends in children's literature, essays by artists and authors, and reviews of new books and paperback reprints for children. Articles are written by the staff and guest reviewers, including librarians, teachers, historians and booksellers. The January issue includes the speeches of the winners of the Boston Globe–Horn Book Award, and each July issue includes the same from the winners of the year's Newbery Medal and Caldecott Medal. The Fanfare list, published in December, is the editors' selection of the best children's and young adult books of the year. No lists were published from 1941 to 1945, or 1955 to 1958.

The Horn Book Magazine also publishes The Horn Book Guide twice a year. Books are given a brief review and a rating from one to six. The Horn Book Guide reviews almost every children's book published in the U.S.

The Horn Book was purchased in 2009 by Media Source Inc. (MSI), owner of the Junior Library Guild, Library Journal and School Library Journal in 2010.

== See also ==
- Hornbook
- List of Horn Book Magazine editors
