= Mary Gould Davis =

American novelist

- Born: February 13, 1882; Bangor, Maine
- Died: April 15, 1956 (aged 74); New York City, New York
- Occupation: Writer
- Writing career
- Period: 1927–1956
- Genre: Children's literature
- Notable work: Truce of the Wolf and Other Tales of Old Italy

Mary Gould Davis (February 13, 1882 – April 15, 1956) was an American author, librarian, storyteller and editor. She received a Newbery Honor.

== Early and personal life ==
Davis was born on February 13, 1882, in Bangor, Maine. She moved to Middlesboro, Kentucky, before relocating more permanently to New York City in 1896.

== Career ==
Davis began working at Brooklyn Public Library as an assistant librarian in 1905, before working at New York Public Library, in the same position, starting in 1913. She was promoted to supervisor of storytelling in 1922, and held that position until her retirement from librarianship on New Year's Eve, 1944. During and after her tenure as supervisor of storytelling, she published a number of books, mainly collections of stories for children. Her first book was 1930's A Baker's Dozen: Thirteen Stories to Tell and to Read Aloud, and, perhaps her most lauded, Truce of the Wolf and Other Tales of Old Italy, was published in 1931 and received a Newbery Honor in 1932. She continued to write and edit books until the publication of The Girl's Book of Verse: A Treasury of Old and New Poems, her final work, in 1952.

== Death ==
Davis died on April 15, 1956, at the age of 74, in New York City.

== Bibliography ==
=== As sole author ===
- A Baker's Dozen: Thirteen Stories to Tell and to Read Aloud: 1930
- Children's Books from Twelve Countries: 1930
- Truce of the Wolf and Other Tales of Old Italy: 1931
- The Handsome Donkey: 1933
- Sandy's Kingdom: 1935
- With Cap and Bells: Humorous Stories to Tell and to Read Aloud: 1937
- Read Today, Star Tomorrow: 1945
- Randolph Caldecott, 1846–1886: An Appreciation: 1946
- The Girl's Book of Verse: A Treasury of Old and New Poems: 1952

=== As co-author ===
- Three Golden Oranges and Other Spanish Folk Tales: 1936 (with Ralph Steele Boggs)
- Stories: A List of Stories to Tell and to Read Aloud: 1943 (with Joan Vatsek)
- Wakaima and the Clay Man and Other African Folktales: 1946 (with Ernest B. Kalibala)
- American Folklore and its Old-World Backgrounds: Following Folktales Around the World: 1949 (with Carl Carmer)

=== As editor ===
- The Art of the Story-Teller — Marie L. Shedlock: 1936 (contributing editor)
- The Mastery of Reading — Matilda Bailey and Ullin Whitney Leavell (editors): 1951 (editorial advisor)
