= Catholic Library Association =

Library Association

- Nickname: CLA
- Formation: 1921
- Tax ID no.: 23-1491160
- Website: cathla.org

The Catholic Library Association is an international membership organization concerned with Catholic Church libraries. Its activities include the development of reference tools and guidance on materials related to Catholicism, and it holds annual conferences and presents awards.

== History ==
The Catholic Library Association was founded in 1921 as a section of the National Catholic Educational Association, and became independent in 1929. Francis E. Fitzgerald served as its first president (1929–1931).

It became an affiliate of the American Library Association in 2007.

Archives of the Association are held at Marquette University.

== Mission ==
According to its official site the CLA:

- Provides leadership for professional development
- Coordinates the exchange of ideas
- Offers spiritual support
- Promotes Catholic and ecumenical literature
- Fosters community among those who seek, serve, preserve, and share the word in all its forms

== Publications ==
- Catholic Library World
- Catholic Periodical and Literature Index established in 1933. Continued after 2011 by the American Theological Library Association.
- Oliver Leonard Kapsner, O.S.B. Cataloging Bulletin (2007–present). ISSN 1940-9702.
- Parish Library Resource Guide: An Annotated Bibliography.
- A Handbook for Church Librarians.
- Developing the Library Collection: A Workbook of Policies and Resources.

== Awards ==
- Regina Medal, est. 1959, recognizes a living person for "continued, distinguished contribution to children's literature without regard to the nature of the contribution." Regina Award Medalists include Anne Carroll Moore, Augusta Baker, Theodor Seuss Geisel, Tomie dePaola, Madeleine L'Engle, and Eric Carle. In 2024, the Regina Medal was awarded to Eric A. Kimmel, a children’s book author.
- St. Katharine Drexel Award, est. 1966, recognizes an "outstanding contribution to the growth of high school librarianship".
- John Brubaker Award, est. 1978, recognizes an “outstanding work of literary merit, considered on the basis of its significant interest to the library profession which was published in Catholic Library World". Zachary Lewis, Student Success Librarian at the University of Dayton, Roesch Library, was recipient of the award in 2022–2023 for his article, "Committing to the Common Good: Reframing Student Success Using Catholic Social Teaching." For 2023–2024, the John Brubaker Memorial Award was given to Hugh Burkhart, Associate Professor, Coordinator of Instruction and Undergraduate Learning at the University of San Diego’s Copley Library. In 2021–2022, Tim Senapatiratne, director of the Spencer Library at the United Theological Seminary of the Twin Cities, received the award for “What is Metaliteracy?: Using the Concepts of Metaliteracy in Theological Librarianship.”
- Aggiornamento Award, est. 1980, is presented by the Parish and Community Library Services Section in recognition of "an outstanding contribution made by an individual or an organization for the renewal of parish and community life in the spirit of Pope John XXIII (1881–1963)."
- Jerome Award, est. 1992, is presented by the Academic Libraries, Archives, and Library Education Section in recognition of "outstanding contribution and commitment to excellence in scholarship which embody the ideals of the Catholic Library Association." It is named after St. Jerome, Doctor of the Church (331-420), patron of librarians. Father David Endres, a priest from the Archdiocese of Cincinnati in Ohio, received the Jerome Award for 2024. In 2025 the Jerome Award was presented to theologian, Dr. Mary Healy.
- Philip F. Neau Memorial Award, est. 2007, is presented biennially by the Children’s Library Services Section to a member, past or current, of the Section for their "outstanding contributions to the Section."
- Mary A. Grant Volunteer Service Award, est. 1996, is presented to a CLA member for their "outstanding volunteer service to the Association." This award is presented by the CLA executive board.
- Charlotte Decker Award is an annual award presented to whom the Catholic Library Association considers an "outstanding member" of the Children’s Library Services Section or the High School/Young Adult Library Services Section.

== Scholarships and grants ==
- The Heritage Fund provides funding for services and growth for the association.
- John T. Corrigan, CFX Memorial Continuing Education Grant, re-established in 2008, supports chapters of the association in their continued offering of educational opportunities for members.
