= Chrys Ingraham =

American sociologist

- Born: October 29, 1947 (age 78)
- Died: May 7, 2024 (aged 76)

Academic background
- Education: Syracuse University

Academic work
- Discipline: Sociologist
- Main interests: Critical heterosexual studies, queer theory, historical sociology, astrosociology, women's studies

Chrys Ingraham (October 29, 1947 – May 7, 2024) was Professor of Sociology at Purchase College of the State University of New York.

== Biography ==
Ingraham was a native of New York State where she worked for 12 years at US Air and co-owned a feminist bookstore before returning to school at Onondaga Community College. She transferred to Syracuse University's Maxwell School where she graduated with a Masters in Public Administration (1984), Graduate Certification in Women's Studies and a PhD in sociology (1992). Her dissertation research addressed how the Comstock Law (1872) allowed for the censorship and suppression of feminist thought in the 19th century US. She has taught at a variety of colleges and universities, including Syracuse University, Ithaca College, Skidmore College, Smith College, Russell Sage College, SUNY Albany, and was professor of sociology at the State University of New York at Purchase.

She was diagnosed with metastatic ovarian cancer, and treatment began in 2020, but she died in 2024.

== Career ==
Ingraham served as visiting professor at Ithaca College prior to receiving tenure and promotion to full professor at Russell Sage College, where she directed the Helen M Upton Center for Women's Studies and co-founded (with Tonia Blackwell) the Allies Center for the Study of Difference and Conflict. She later co-founded (with Eileen Brownell) their Management and Social Responsibility program. In 2007, she moved to SUNY Purchase to rebuild the Sociology program and later assisted in the creation of a Latin American studies major. Ingraham served as professor of sociology at Purchase College.

Ingraham was a guest speaker for the film Wedding Advice by Karen Sosnoski and Fred Zeytoojian, 2002. Ingraham co-ran an "in conversation" series with Debbie Hedberg on Hedberg's YouTube channel, FreebirdSpirit. Their 30+ conversations are titled "Love is the Wisdom behind Awakening" and focus on current issues and psychic medium contributions.

== Publications ==
=== Books (written, edited, or co-edited) ===
- 1997 Materialist Feminism: A Reader in Class, Difference, and Women's Lives, ed. by Chrys Ingraham and Rosemary Hennessy, Routledge, 1997. According to WorldCat, the book is held in 347 libraries.
- 1999 White Weddings: Romancing Heterosexuality in Popular Culture, 1st edition, Routledge, 1999
- 2008 White Weddings: Romancing Heterosexuality in Popular Culture, 2nd edition, Routledge, 2008.
- 2024 White Weddings: Romancing Heterosexuality in Popular Culture, 3rd edition, Routledge, 2024. According to WorldCat, the editions of this book are held in 820 libraries.
- 2005 Thinking Straight: The Power, the Promise, and the Paradox of Heterosexuality, ed.by Chrys Ingraham. Routledge, 2005. ISBN 9780415932738. According to WorldCat, the book is held in 1116 libraries.

=== Book chapters ===
- "Heterosexuality: It's Just Not Natural!," in Handbook of Lesbian and Gay Studies, edited by Diane Richardson and Steven Seidman, London: Sage. 2002 According to WorldCat, the book is held in 613 libraries.
- "Thinking Straight, Acting Bent: Heteronormativity and Homosexuality," in Handbook of Gender and Women's Studies, edited by Kathy Davis, Mary Evans, and Judith Lorber, London: Sage. 2006.
- "Straightening Up: The Marriage of Conformity and Resistance in Wedding Art," in Wedded Bliss: The Marriage of Art and Ceremony, edited by Paula Bradstreet Richter, Peabody Essex Museum: 2008.
- "One is not Born A Bride", in Introduction to Sexuality Studies, edited by Steven Seidman, Nancy Fischer, and Chet Meeks, Routledge: New York. 2011.

=== Academic journal articles ===
- "The Heterosexual Imaginary: Feminist Sociology and Theories of Gender", Sociological Theory, Vol. 12, No. 2 (Jul., 1994), pp. 203–219
- "Systemic Pedagogy: Activating Sociological Thinking Inside and Outside the Classroom", International Journal of Sociology and Social Policy, 1996
- "Situational Shifts in Sex Role Orientation: Correlates of Work Satisfaction and Burnout Among Women in Special Education", Sex Roles, Vol. 25. Nos. 7/8 1991

=== Encyclopedia entries ===
- "Weddings", in Routledge International Encyclopedia of Women, edited by Cherie Kramarae and Dale Spender, London: Sage, 2000
- "Heterosexual Imaginary", with Casey Saunders, in The Wiley-Blackwell Encyclopedia of Gender and Sexuality Studies, edited by Nancy Naples. Boston: Wiley-Blackwell, 2015
