= Ingraham =

Ingraham may refer to:

== People ==
- Albert Ingraham Paine (1874–1949), English soldier
- Andrew Ingraham (1841–1905), philologist and schoolmaster
- Chrys Ingraham (born 1947), American sociologist
- Duncan Ingraham (1802–1891), officer in the United States Navy and Confederate States Navy
- Edward Sturgis Ingraham (1852–1926), first superintendent of the Seattle Public Schools and mountaineer
- Elizabeth Wright Ingraham (1922–2013), American architect and educator
- Frances Adelaide Leverich Ingraham (died 1934), American clubwoman
- George Landon Ingraham (1847–1931), American lawyer and judge
- Hubert Ingraham (born 1947), second prime minister of the Bahamas
- Joseph Ingraham (1762–1800), American sailor and fur trader
- Joseph Holt Ingraham (writer) (1809–1860), American author
- Laura Ingraham (born 1963), American television and talk radio host
- Lloyd Ingraham (1874–1956), American actor and director
- Mary Ingraham (1901–1982), Bahamian suffragist
- Melissa Ingraham (born 1997), Bahamian model
- Oswald Ingraham (1937–2020), Bahamian politician and businessman
- Pat Ingraham (born 1950), American politician
- Patricia Ingraham, Syracuse University professor
- Prentiss Ingraham (1843–1904), Confederate Army colonel and fiction writer
- William Moulton Ingraham (1870–1951), former mayor of Portland, Maine, and Assistant Secretary of War in 1917
- Ingraham Ebenezer Bill (1805–1891), Canadian author, journalist, and minister

== Places in the United States ==
- Ingraham, Illinois, an unincorporated community
- Ingraham Township, Mills County, Iowa
- Ingraham Glacier, Washington
- Ingraham Hill, New York, a mountain
- Ingraham Lake, Florida

== Other uses ==
- USS Ingraham, United States Navy ships named for Duncan Ingraham
- Ingraham High School, Seattle, Washington, United States
- Ingraham Institute, a high school in Ghaziabad, Uttar Pradesh, India
- Ingraham Building, a commercial building in Miami, Florida, United States
- Ingraham Highway, name of part of Florida State Road 9336

== See also ==
- William Ingraham Kip
- Ingram (disambiguation)
- Ingham (disambiguation)
- Engram (disambiguation)
