= Ingram =

Ingram may refer to:

== People ==
- Ingram (given name)
- Ingram (surname)
  - Ingram baronets, a title in the Baronetage of the United Kingdom, created 9 August 1893

== Places ==
- Ingram Park Mall, a mall in Texas, US
- Ingram, Northumberland, England
- Ingram, California, community in Mendocino County, California, US
- Ingram, Pennsylvania in Allegheny County, Pennsylvania, US
- Ingram, Texas, city in Kerr County, Texas, US
- Ingram, Wisconsin, village in Rusk County, Wisconsin, US
- Ingram's Hall, a house at Shrewsbury School

== Organizations ==
- Ingram Industries, a large US corporation, and its subsidiaries
  - Ingram Barge Company, US barge company
  - Ingram Content Group, US book distributor
  - Ingram Entertainment Holdings Inc., an American distributor of home entertainment products
- Ingram Micro, a distributor of information technology products
- Ingram Merrill Foundation, a private foundation operated during James Ingram Merrill's lifetime and subsidized literature, the arts, and public television

== Things ==
- Clara Ingram Judson Award (Clara Ingram Judson Memorial Award), given annually to the most creative children's writing
- Ingram: A Novel, 2025 novel by American writer, actor, and comedian Louis C.K.
- Ingram MAC-10, a model of machine pistol
- Ingram MAC-11, a model of machine pistol
- AV-98 Ingram, a fictional type of robot in the Patlabor anime and manga franchise
- 6285 Ingram, an asteroid
- Ingram's brown snake, a species of venomous snake in the family Elapidae
- Ingram's planigale or Long-tailed planigale, a species of marsupial
- Ingram's squirrel or Sciurus ingrami, a species of squirrel found in South America
- Jack Ingram (album), the eponymous debut album by country music artist Jack Ingram
- USS George W. Ingram (DE-62), a destroyer of the United States Navy

== See also ==
- Ingham (disambiguation)
- Ingraham (disambiguation)
- Justice Ingram (disambiguation)
- Engram (disambiguation)
- Enguerrand
