= USS Ira Jeffery =

Buckley-class destroyer escort

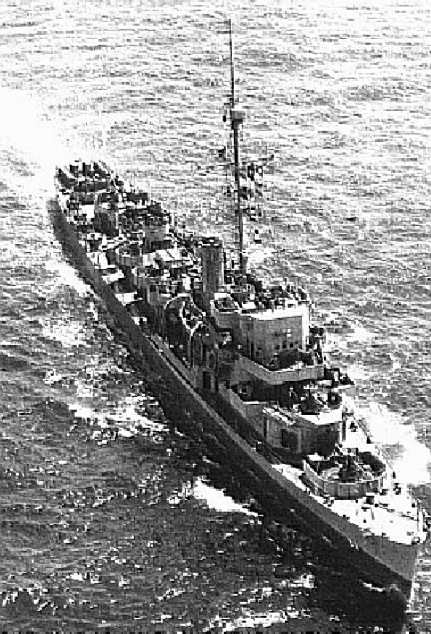

History

United States
- Name: USS Ira Jeffery
- Ordered: 1942
- Builder: Bethlehem Hingham Shipyard
- Laid down: 13 February 1943
- Launched: 15 May 1943
- Commissioned: 15 August 1943
- Decommissioned: 18 June 1946
- Reclassified: APD-44, 23 February 1945
- Stricken: 1 June 1960
- Fate: Sunk as target, July 1962

General characteristics
- Class & type: Buckley-class destroyer escort
- Displacement: 1,400 long tons (1,422 t) light; 1,740 long tons (1,768 t) standard
- Length: 306 ft (93 m)
- Beam: 37 ft (11 m)
- Draft: 9 ft 6 in (2.90 m) standard; 11 ft 3 in (3.43 m) full load
- Propulsion: 2 × boilers; General Electric turbo-electric drive; 12,000 shp (8.9 MW); 2 × solid manganese-bronze 3,600 lb (1,600 kg) 3-bladed propellers, 8 ft 6 in (2.59 m) diameter, 7 ft 7 in (2.31 m) pitch; 2 × rudders; 359 tons fuel oil
- Speed: 23 knots (43 km/h; 26 mph)
- Range: 3,700 nmi (6,900 km) at 15 kn (28 km/h; 17 mph); 6,000 nmi (11,000 km) at 12 kn (22 km/h; 14 mph)
- Complement: 15 officers, 198 men
- Armament: 3 × 3"/50 caliber guns; 1 × quad 1.1"/75 caliber gun; 8 × single 20 mm guns; 1 × triple 21 inch (533 mm) torpedo tubes; 1 × Hedgehog anti-submarine mortar; 8 × K-gun depth charge projectors; 2 × depth charge tracks

USS Ira Jeffery (DE-63/APD-44), a Buckley-class destroyer escort of the United States Navy, was named in honor of Ensign Ira Weil Jeffery (1918–1941) who was killed in action during the Japanese attack on the Hawaiian Islands while serving aboard the battleship California.

Ira Jeffery was laid down as Jeffery on 13 February 1943 by Bethlehem-Hingham Shipyard, Inc., Hingham, Massachusetts; launched on 15 May 1943; sponsored by Mrs. D. C. Jeffery, mother of Ensign Jeffery, renamed Ira Jeffery on 29 July 1943; and commissioned on 15 August 1943.

== Service history ==
Ira Jeffery conducted shakedown training off Bermuda and in Casco Bay, Maine, before returning to Naval Torpedo Station, Quonset, Rhode Island, for experiments with noise-makers designed to counter the German acoustic torpedo. She then moved to New York and departed on 5 November 1943 with her first Atlantic convoy. During the next year, she sailed with seven Atlantic troop convoys, seeing each safely to staging points in Northern Ireland or Great Britain. After her return to Charleston on 22 October 1944, Ira Jeffery joined a large convoy of cranes, powerplants, and tugs bound for the invasion ports of Europe. On the return crossing, 20 December 1944, the escort's convoy was attacked by the U-boat U-870. After sinking an LST and damaging destroyer escort Fogg, the submarine was driven off. Ira Jeffery assisted the damaged ship and eventually escorted her through rough seas to the Azores.

Returning to the United States on 1 February 1945, the ship spent two weeks working with experimental mines in Chesapeake Bay. She entered the Marine Basin Shipyard, Brooklyn on 20 February for conversion to a Charles Lawrence-class high speed transport. After the installation of troop quarters and extensive alterations she emerged in May 1945 as APD-44 (officially reclassified on 23 February 1945) and departed on 12 May for shakedown in Chesapeake Bay. Ira Jeffery then sailed on 25 May with aircraft carrier Antietam (CV-36) for the Panama Canal and Pearl Harbor, where she arrived on 18 June 1945.

After training in Hawaiian waters, the ship returned to San Diego on 23 July and began training with Underwater Demolition Teams. She sailed on 16 August, the day after the war's end for the forward areas, stopping at Eniwetok, Ulithi, and Manila. After demolition exercises in Lingayen Gulf, she sailed to Wakayama, Japan, where underwater demolition teams reconnoitered beaches prior to American occupation landings. After the successful operation, Ira Jeffery sailed for the United States, arriving San Diego on 20 November 1945.

The ship sailed via the Panama Canal for the East Coast and, after her arrival Philadelphia on 8 December, underwent repairs. Ira Jeffery then sailed to Jacksonville, Florida, and decommissioned at Green Cove Springs on 18 June 1946. She entered the Atlantic Reserve Fleet and remained there until struck from the Navy List on 1 June 1960. She was sunk during tests in July 1962.
