= Ingham =

Ingham may refer to:

== Places ==
=== Antarctica ===
- Ingham Glacier, a contributing glacier of Borchgrevink Glacier, Victory Mountains, Victoria Land

=== Australia ===
- Ingham, Queensland, a town and locality
  - Ingham railway station, Queensland

=== England ===
- Ingham, Lincolnshire, a village and civil parish
- Ingham, Norfolk, a village and civil parish
- Ingham, Suffolk, a village and civil parish
  - Ingham railway station

=== United States ===
- Ingham County, Michigan
- Ingham Township, Michigan
- Ingham, Nebraska, a ghost town
- Ingham, Ohio, a ghost town
- Ingham, Virginia, an unincorporated community

== People ==
- Ingham (surname)
- Ingham Brooke (1836–1906), Anglican Archdeacon of Halifax, England

== Ships ==
- USCGC Ingham (WHEC-35), a United States Coast Guard cutter preserved as a memorial ship
- USCGC Ingham (WMSM-917), a United States Coast Guard cutter currently contracted for construction
- USRC Ingham (1832), a United States Revenue Cutter Service schooner
- USRC Ingham (1849), a United States Revenue Cutter Service schooner

== Other uses ==
- Ingham University, Le Roy, New York, first women's college in New York State and first chartered women's university in the United States
- RAF Cammeringham, formerly RAF Ingham, a former Royal Air Force station used by RAF Bomber Command and the Polish Air Force during the Second World War

== See also ==
- Ingham Academy High School (Michigan), an alternative high school in Lansing, Michigan, United States
- Aston Ingham, Herefordshire, England
- Inghams, an Australian poultry supplier
- Ingram (disambiguation)
- Ingraham (disambiguation)
- List of generic forms in place names in the British Isles § ingham
