= USS Antietam (CV-36) =

Essex-class aircraft carrier of the US Navy

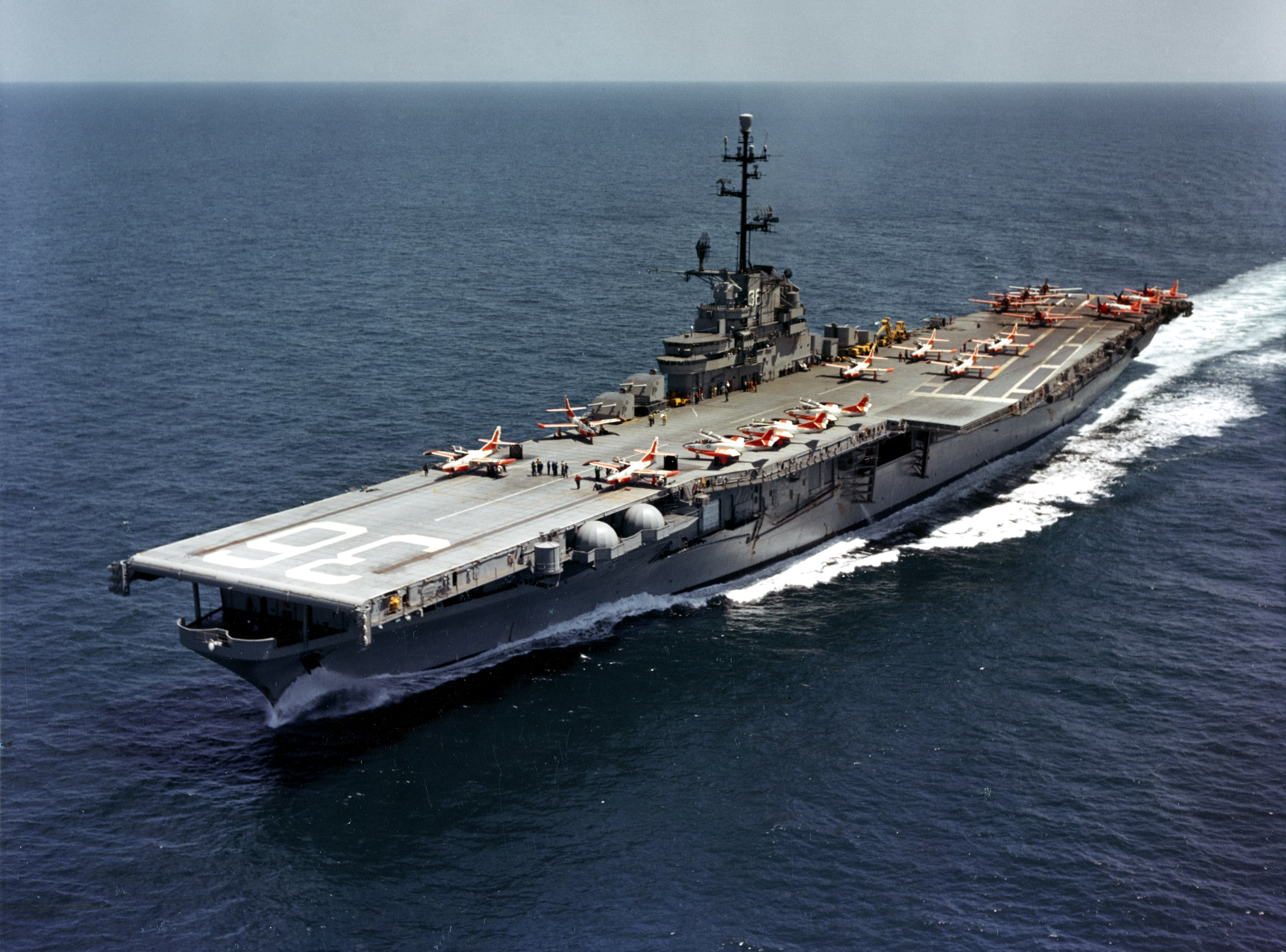
- USS Antietam on 19 April 1961

History

United States
- Name: Antietam
- Namesake: Battle of Antietam
- Builder: Philadelphia Naval Shipyard
- Laid down: 15 March 1943
- Launched: 20 August 1944
- Commissioned: 28 January 1945
- Decommissioned: 21 June 1949
- Recommissioned: 17 July 1951
- Decommissioned: 8 May 1963
- Reclassified: CVA-36, 1 October 1952; CVS-36, 1 August 1953
- Stricken: 1 May 1973
- Fate: Scrapped, 28 February 1974

General characteristics
- Class & type: Essex-class aircraft carrier
- Displacement: 27,100 long tons (27,500 t) standard
- Length: 888 feet (271 m) overall
- Beam: 93 feet (28 m)
- Draft: 28 feet 7 inches (8.71 m)
- Installed power: 8 × boilers; 150,000 shp (110 MW)
- Propulsion: 4 × geared steam turbines; 4 × shafts
- Speed: 33 knots (61 km/h; 38 mph)
- Complement: 3448 officers and enlisted
- Armament: 12 × 5 inch (127 mm)/38 caliber guns; 32 × Bofors 40 mm guns; 46 × Oerlikon 20 mm cannons
- Armor: Belt: 4 in (102 mm); Hangar deck: 2.5 in (64 mm); Deck: 1.5 in (38 mm); Conning tower: 1.5 inch
- Aircraft carried: 90–100 aircraft

USS Antietam (CV/CVA/CVS-36) was one of 24 Essex-class aircraft carriers built during and shortly after World War II for the United States Navy. The ship was the second US Navy ship to bear the name, and was named for the American Civil War Battle of Antietam (Maryland). Antietam was commissioned in January 1945, too late to serve actively in World War II. After serving a short time in the Far East, she was decommissioned in 1949. She was soon recommissioned for Korean War service, and in that conflict earned two battle stars. In the early 1950s, she was redesignated an attack carrier (CVA) and then an antisubmarine warfare carrier (CVS). After the Korean War she spent the rest of her career operating in the Atlantic, Caribbean, and Mediterranean. From 1957 until her deactivation in October 1962 she was the Navy's training carrier, operating out of Florida.

Antietam was fitted with a port sponson in 1952 to make her the world's first true angled-deck aircraft carrier. However, she received no major modernizations other than this, and thus throughout her career largely retained the classic appearance of a World War II Essex-class ship. She was decommissioned in 1963, and sold for scrap in 1974.

== Construction and career ==
Antietam was one of the "long-hull" Essex-class ships. The keel was laid on 15 March 1943 at the Philadelphia Navy Yard. The ship was launched on 20 August 1944 sponsored by Mrs. Millard E. Tydings, the wife of Senator Tydings of Maryland. Antietam was commissioned on 28 January 1945, with Captain James R. Tague in command.

=== World War II and occupation of Japan ===
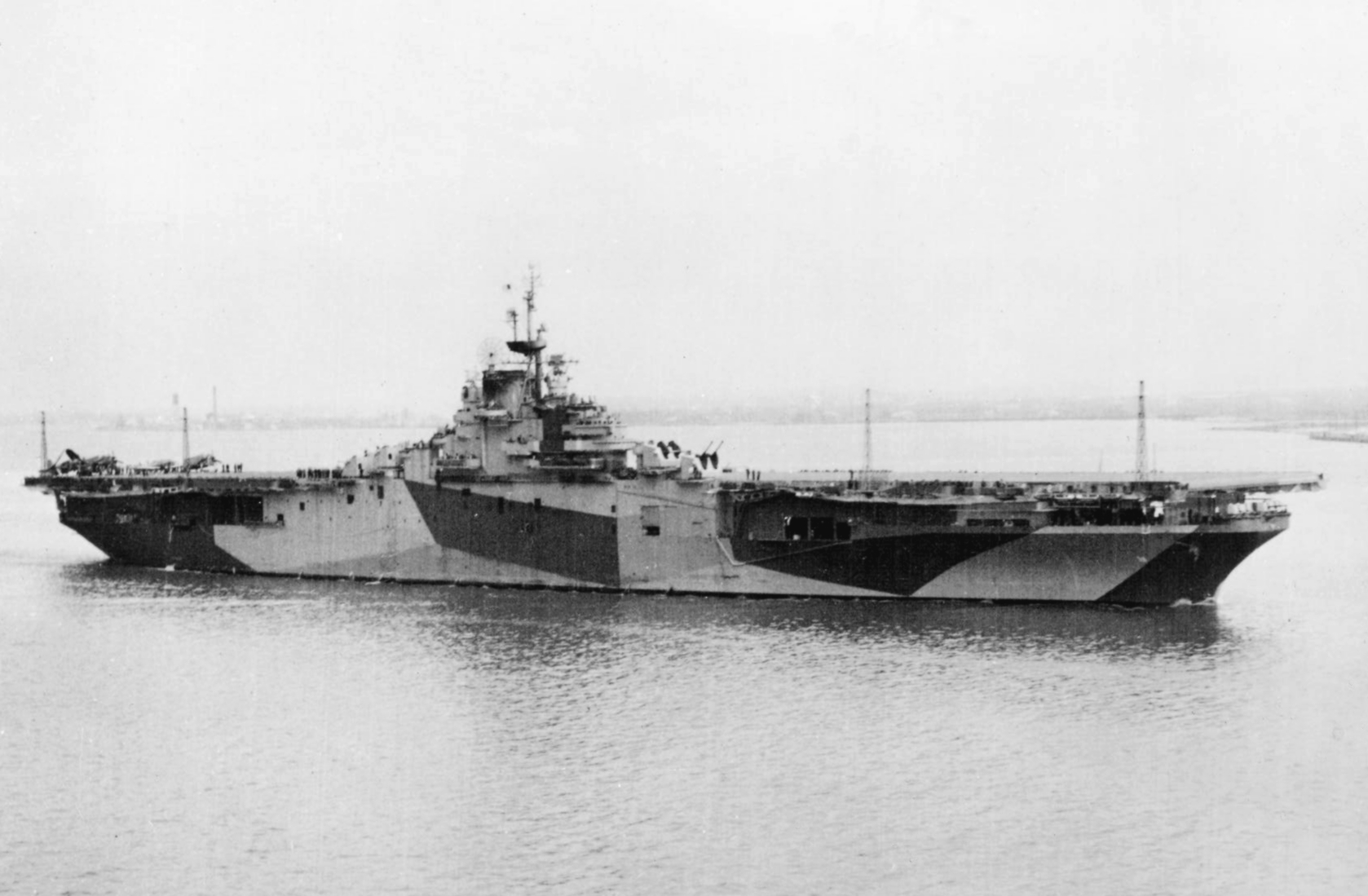
Antietam off Philadelphia Navy Yard in 1945

The aircraft carrier completed fitting out at Philadelphia until 2 March 1945, when she got underway for her shakedown cruise. The ship arrived in Hampton Roads on 5 March and conducted operations from Norfolk until 22 March, when she stood out of Chesapeake Bay bound for Trinidad in the British West Indies. At the conclusion of her shakedown cruise, Antietam returned to Philadelphia on 28 April to begin post-shakedown availability. She completed repairs on 19 May and departed Philadelphia that same day. After a three-day stop at Norfolk, the warship resumed her voyage to the Panama Canal in company with Higbee, George W. Ingram, and Ira Jeffery. She arrived at Cristóbal on 31 May, transited the Panama Canal the next day, and continued her voyage up the coast to San Diego. She stopped at San Diego from 10 to 13 June before beginning the first leg of her transpacific voyage. Antietam arrived in Pearl Harbor on 19 June and remained in the Hawaiian Islands conducting training missions until 12 August. On that day, she shaped a course for the western Pacific.

Three days out of Oahu, she received word of the Japanese capitulation and the consequent cessation of hostilities. Thus, by the time of her arrival in Eniwetok Atoll on 19 August, her mission changed from combat to occupation support duty. On 21 August, she exited the lagoon in company with Cabot and a screen of destroyers bound for Japan. En route, she suffered some internal damage which forced her into port at Apra Harbor, Guam, for inspections. The inspection party deemed the damage minimal; and the carrier remained operational, resuming her course on 27 August. By that time, however, her destination had been changed to the coast of the Asian mainland. She stopped at Okinawa between 30 August and 1 September, and arrived in Chinese waters near Shanghai the following day.

The aircraft carrier remained in the Far East for a little more than three years. The Yellow Sea constituted her primary theater of operations while her air group provided support for the Allied occupation of North China, Manchuria, and Korea. During the latter stages of that assignment, her airmen conducted surveillance missions in that area as a result of the civil war in China between communist and nationalist factions which later resulted in the expulsion of Chiang Kai-shek's forces from mainland China and the establishment of Mao Zedong's communist People's Republic of China. Throughout the period, however, she did depart the Yellow Sea on occasion for visits to Japan, the Philippines, Okinawa, and the Marianas. Early in 1949, she concluded her mission in the Orient and headed back to the United States for deactivation. She was decommissioned on 21 June 1949.

=== Korean War ===
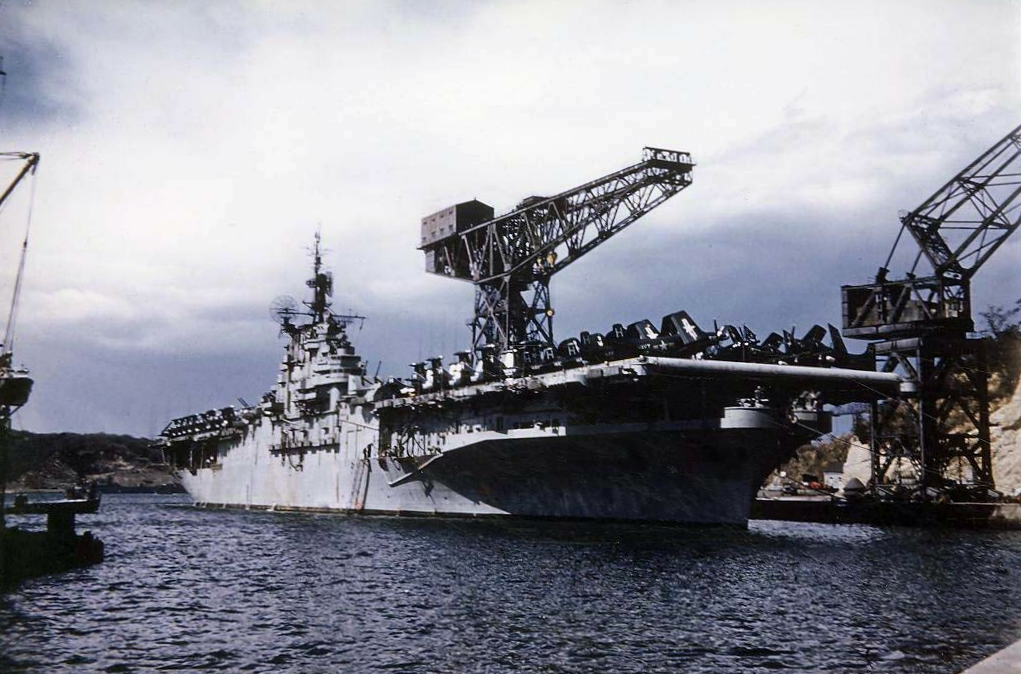
Antietam in Yokosuka, 1951

Antietam remained in reserve at Alameda, California, but after Communist forces from North Korea invaded South Korea on 25 June 1950, she began reactivation preparations on 6 December and went back into commission on 17 January 1951, with Captain George J. Dufek in command. Initially, the carrier conducted shakedown training and carrier qualifications along the California coast, first out of Alameda and – after 14 May – out of San Diego. She made one voyage to Pearl Harbor and back to San Diego in July and August before departing the latter port on 8 September and heading for the Far East. Antietam arrived in the Far East later that fall and, by late November, began the only combat deployment of her career. During that tour, she made four cruises with Task Force 77 (TF 77), in the combat zone off the coast of the Korean peninsula. In between fighting assignments, she returned to Yokosuka, Japan. During each of those periods, her air group carried out a variety of missions in support of United Nations forces combating North Korean aggression. Those missions included combat air patrol, logistics interdiction, particularly against railroad and highway traffic, reconnaissance, antisubmarine patrols, and night heckler missions. From late November 1951 to mid-March 1952, Antietam's air group flew nearly 6,000 sorties of all types. She returned to Yokosuka on 21 March 1952 at the conclusion of her fourth cruise with TF 77 to begin preparations for her voyage back to the United States.

=== Later years ===
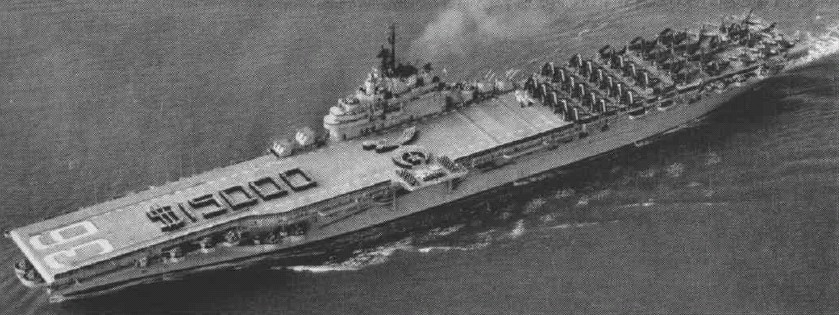
Antietam returning from Korea in March 1952

The aircraft carrier returned home in April and rejoined the Pacific Reserve Fleet briefly. She was reactivated later that summer and, in August, transited the Panama Canal to join the Atlantic Fleet. In September, the warship entered the New York Naval Shipyard for major alterations. In October, she was redesignated an attack aircraft carrier, CVA-36. In December 1952 Antietam emerged from the yard as the world's first carrier with a true angled flight deck. The principle had been tried on other carriers with lines painted on an axis deck. Antietam's deck was based on a rudimentary sponson. The installation allowed for true angle deck tests, including arrested landings. Trials with British and US units proved during trials to be superior to the usual fore-aft deck. She operated out of Quonset Point, Rhode Island, until the beginning of 1955. During the intervening years, she participated in numerous fleet and independent ship's exercises. Detachment #39 from VC-4, NAS Atlantic City was sent out on the Antietam on 9 June 1953. The stated purpose was to show off the canted deck capabilities to the Royal Navy. There were two aircraft with pilots and 13 enlisted men. Two days of flight operation took place with all sorts of Royal Navy aircraft making touch and gos. The F3Ds were used to give Royal Navy VIPs catapult shots and arrested landings. The VC-4 pilots were air lifted back to the states on 3 July and the F3Ds were off loaded and flown back to Atlantic City from Rhode Island. After August 1953, during which time she was redesignated an Anti-submarine warfare carrier (ASW), CVS-36 Antietam concentrated up on honing her hunter/killer skills.

== Post-Korean War ==
In January 1955, she embarked upon a voyage to the Mediterranean Sea where she served with the 6th Fleet until March. Resuming duty with the Atlantic Fleet ASW forces, she operated along the eastern seaboard until the fall of 1956. In October of that year, she cruised to the waters of the eastern Atlantic for NATO ASW exercises and goodwill visits to ports in Allied countries. She ran aground off Brest, France, on 22 October 1956, but was refloated undamaged. While the carrier was in Rotterdam, the Suez crisis broke out in the eastern Mediterranean. Antietam cut short her visit to the Netherlands and headed for the Mediterranean to bolster the 6th Fleet during the evacuation of American citizens from Alexandria, Egypt. At the end of that assignment, she conducted ASW training exercises with Italian naval officers embarked before returning to Quonset Point on 22 December.

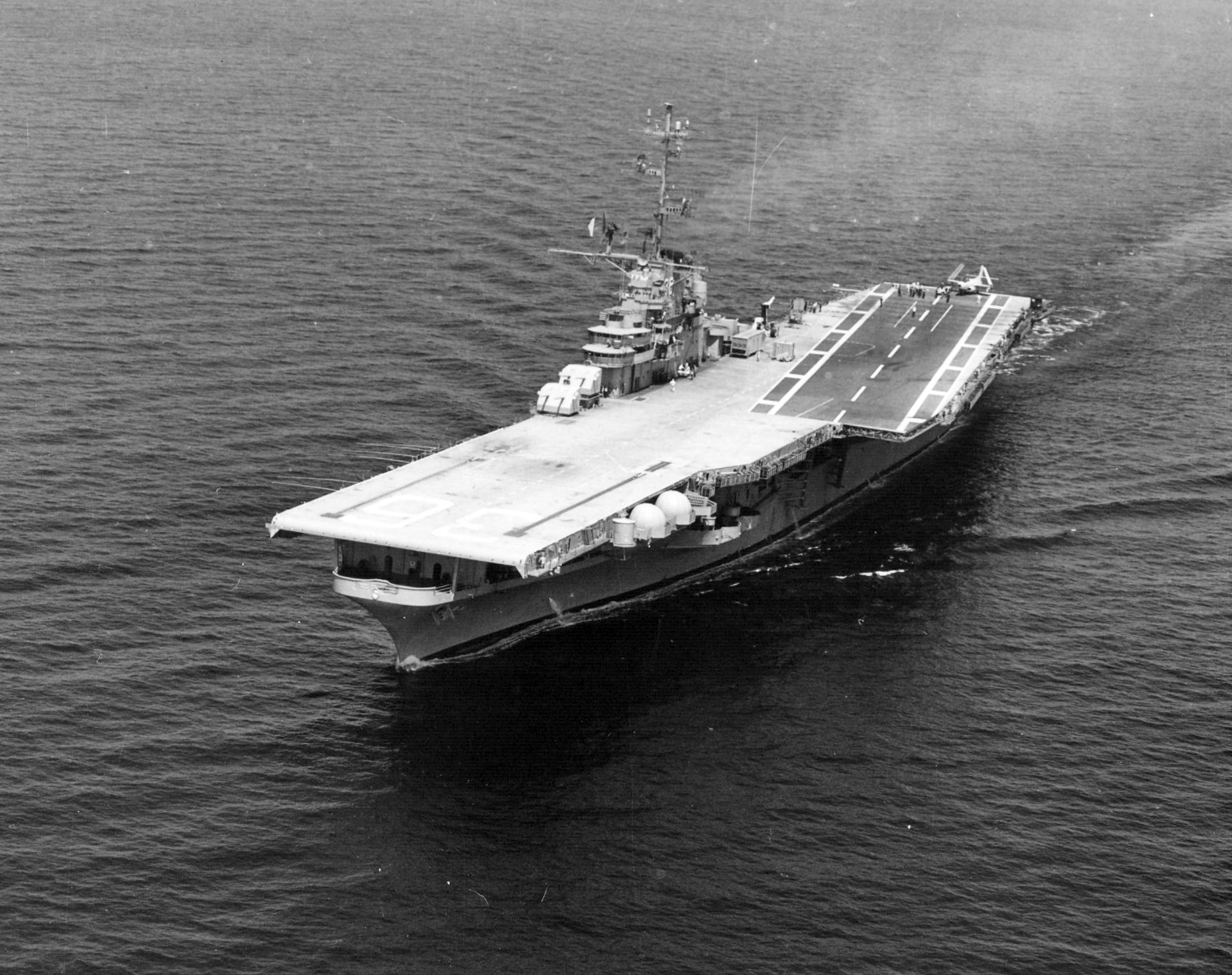
Antietam with her angled deck in 1957

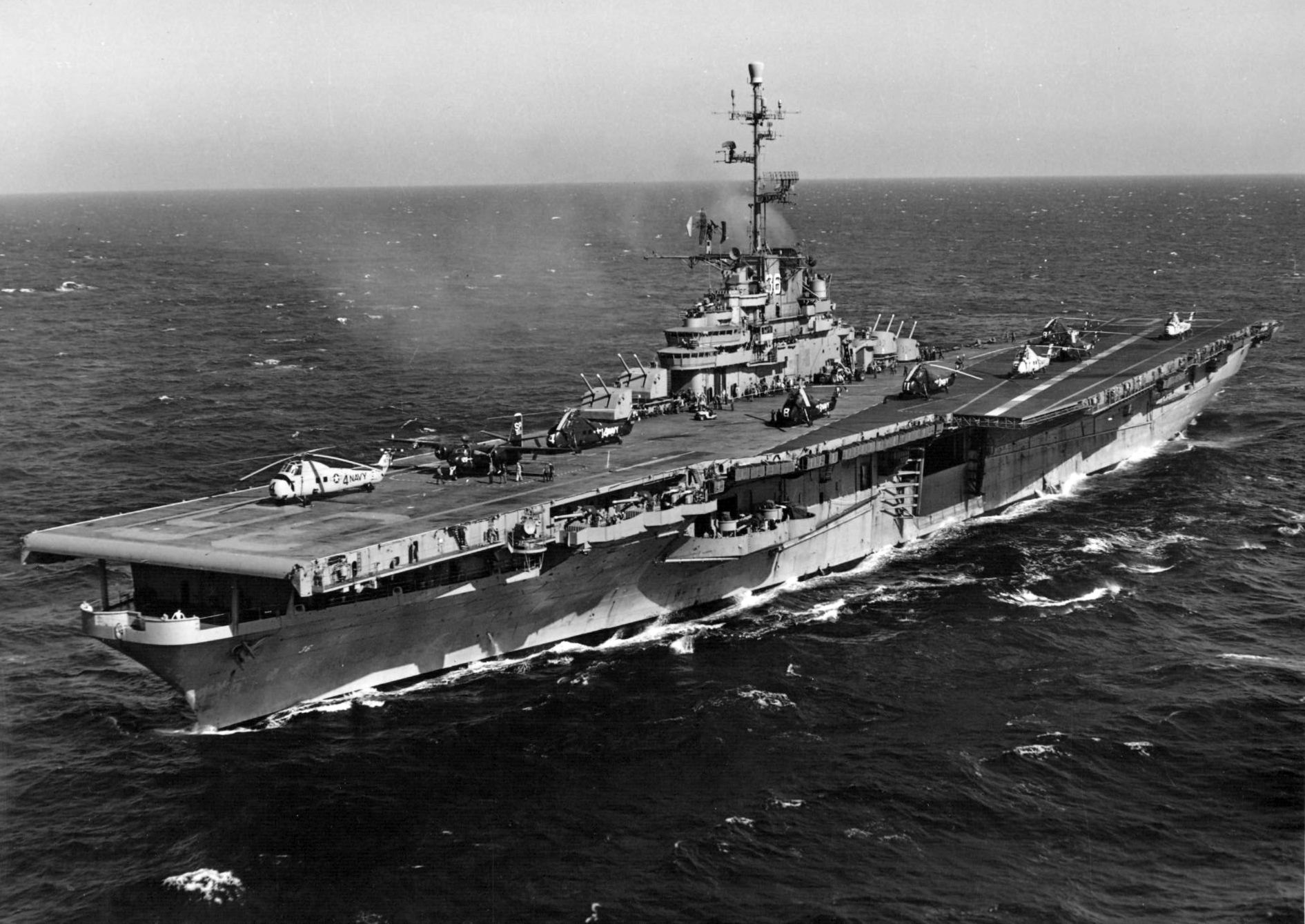
Antietam with S2F-1 Tracker and HSS-1 Seabats on 31 January 1957

After resuming operations along the eastern seaboard early in 1957, Antietam was assigned on 21 April 1957 to training duty with the Naval Air Station Pensacola, Florida. Mayport however, served as her home port because ships of her draft could not then enter port at Pensacola. For almost two years the aircraft carrier operated out of Mayport training new Navy pilots and conducting tests on new aviation equipment—most noteworthy on the Bell automatic landing system during August 1958. She also participated in annual Naval Academy midshipmen cruises each summer.

In January 1959, after the deepening of the channel into Pensacola had been completed, Antietam's home port was changed from Mayport to Pensacola. For the remainder of her active career, the carrier operated out of Pensacola as an aviation training ship.

The deck of the Antietam served as the launching pad for the stratospheric balloon flight of Commander Malcolm D. Ross and Lieutenant Commander Victor A. Prather, both of the United States Navy, on 4 May 1961. This flight set an absolute official altitude record for manned balloons of 113,740 feet (34,670 m). The flight took place over the Gulf of Mexico. During recovery, Prather slipped from the rescue helicopter's lifting harness and fell into the ocean; he died from his injuries onboard Antietam. Commander Ross was successfully recovered.

On two occasions, she provided humanitarian services to victims of hurricane damage. The first came in September 1961 when she rushed to the Texas coast to provide supplies and medical assistance to the victims of Hurricane Carla. The second came just over a month later when she carried medical supplies, doctors, nurses, and other medical personnel to British Honduras to help the victims of Hurricane Hattie. Otherwise, she spent the final four years of her naval career in routine naval aviation training duty out of Pensacola. On 23 October 1962, Antietam was relieved by sister ship Lexington as aviation training ship at Pensacola and was placed in commission, in reserve, on 7 January 1963. Berthed at Philadelphia, she remained in reserve until May 1973 when her name was struck from the Navy List. On 28 February 1974, she was sold to the Union Minerals & Alloys Corp. for scrapping.

== Awards ==

China Service Medal (extended)	American Campaign Medal	Asiatic-Pacific Campaign Medal
World War II Victory Medal	Navy Occupation Service Medal (with Asia clasp)	National Defense Service Medal
Korean Service Medal (with 2 battle stars)	United Nations Service Medal	Republic of Korea War Service Medal (retroactive)

== See also ==
- List of aircraft carriers
