= USS Ingram =

There have been three United States Navy ships with variations of the name Ingram:

- USS Osmond Ingram (DD-255)
- USS Jonas Ingram (DD-938)
- USS George W. Ingram (DE-62)
