= Theodore Roosevelt, Fighting Patriot =

1953 children's book by Clara Ingram Judson

- First edition cover
- Language: English
- Genre: Children's literature
- Publisher: Follett
- Publication date: 1953
- Publication place: United States
- Pages: 218

Theodore Roosevelt, Fighting Patriot is a 1953 children's biography of Theodore Roosevelt written by American author Clara Ingram Judson and illustrated by Lorence F. Bjorklund. It covers his sickly youth growing up in New York, college life at Harvard University, marriage to Alice Hathaway Lee Roosevelt, entry into state politics as assemblyman, time with the Rough Riders in the Spanish–American War, elevation to President after the assassination of William McKinley, and finally his death in 1919.

== Reception ==
The book earned a Newbery Honor in 1954, Judson's second (1947). The New York Times review called it a "virorous portrait" and a "faithful likeness of the great leader".
