= N-gram (disambiguation) =

An n-gram is a sequence of n words, characters, or other linguistic items.

n-gram may also refer to:

- Google Ngram Viewer
- n-gram language model
- k-mer, the application of the n-gram concept to biological sequences

== See also ==
- Polygram (geometry), polygons ending in the suffix -gram
- Engram (disambiguation)
