= USRC Harrison =

Ship of the U.S. Revenue Cutter Service

History

United States
- Builder: John Carrick, Erie, Pennsylvania
- Cost: $12,300
- Completed: 14 August 1849
- Acquired: 11 August 1849
- Homeport: Oswego, New York
- Fate: sold 6 October 1856

General characteristics
- Class & type: Schooner
- Displacement: 115 tons
- Propulsion: sail
- Sail plan: topsail schooner

USRC Harrison was the lead ship of her topsail schooner class, which was built and operated by the United States Revenue-Marine, later Revenue Cutter Service, between 1849 and 1856.

== Design and construction ==
In 1848, the Revenue Cutter Service awarded contracts for seven cutters, two for use on the Great Lakes. The resulting USRC Harrison and USRC Ingham were built with a lighter draft and smaller size to facilitate their work. Both ships were topsail schooners, with a 115-ton draft and total cost of $12,300.

A proposal by John Carrick for the cutter's construction at Erie, Pennsylvania was accepted on 16 October 1848. Harrison was completed, delivered and accepted on 11 August 1849.

== Service history ==
The Harrison would be stationed at Oswego, New York for her entire career until her disposition in 1856. On 12 November 1852 she was damaged by a storm, requiring repairs estimated to be worth $1,280. On 6 October 1856 she was auctioned to Messrs. Merry and Gay for $1,690 after it was authorized by the United States Congress.
