= Politics of outer space =

Political considerations of space policy

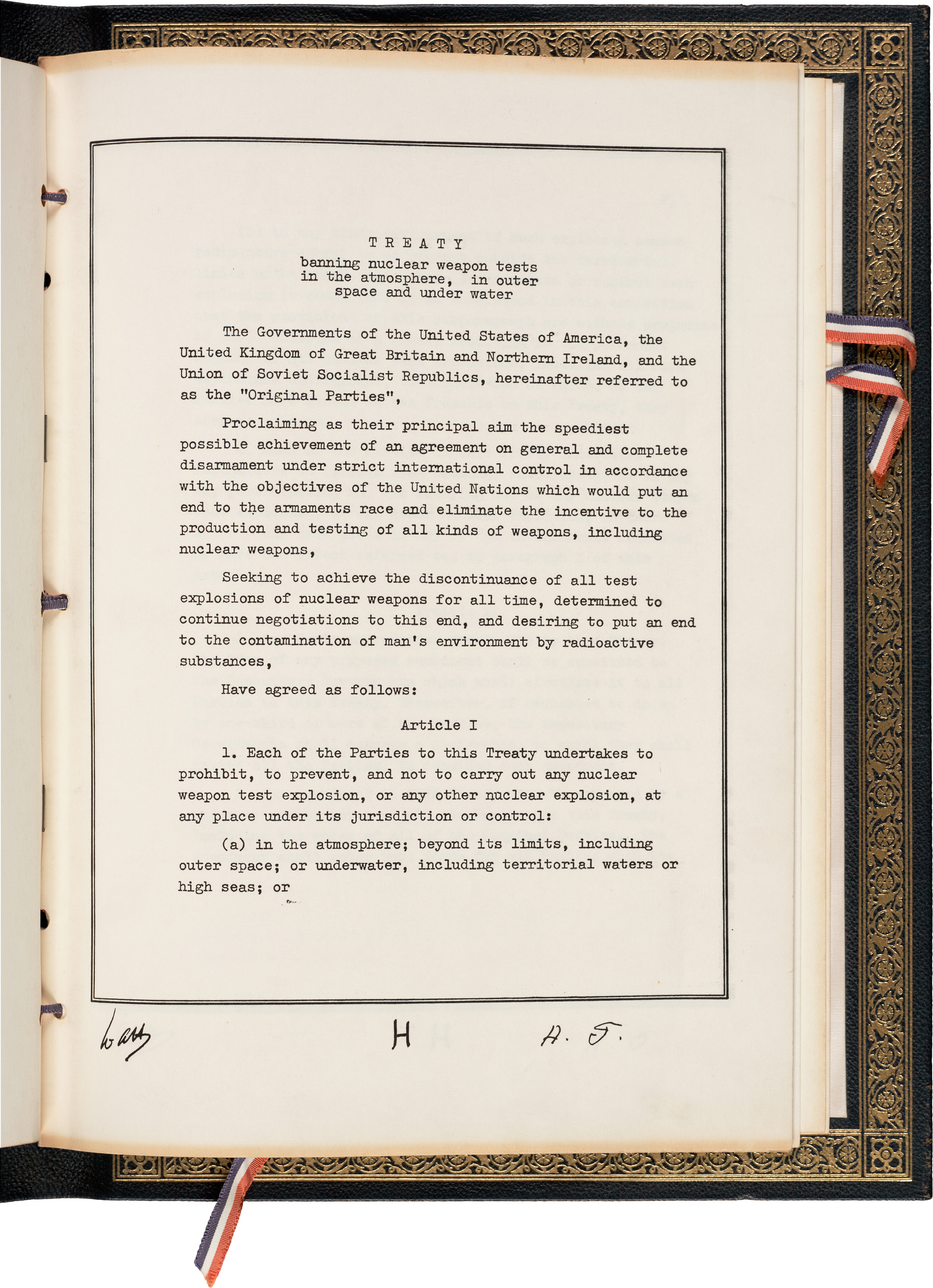
The first page of the 1963 treaty that banned nuclear tests in the atmosphere, outer space and under water

The politics of outer space refers to the political implications and effects of efforts to expand our human awareness and presence beyond the Earth’s atmosphere.

This field of politics includes:

- space policies, which refer to legislation or guidelines that govern how decisions made by states and international organizations should be put into operation.
- international relations, which refer to the patterns of competition, cooperation, and governance through which states and other actors organize the use of space for security, economic, and political purposes.
- geopolitics which refers to the organization and contestation of power through the material infrastructures, spatial arrangements, and governing regimes that structure access to, use of, and control over outer space and its connections to Earth.

== Global security and space policies ==
US Air Force judge advocate Matthew King, writing in a personal capacity, has looked at the major powers' cooperation in space matters in the light of international geo-political relationships on earth. He holds that joint engagement in space matters, especially for the United States, China and Russia, can be viewed via two alternative lenses: it can facilitate peace and understanding (a lens he refers to as an olive branch) or it can hide true relationships (the lens of a fig leaf).

== Politics of the ISS ==
Primary contributing nations Formerly contracted nations

The politics of the International Space Station have been affected by superpower rivalries, international treaties, and funding arrangements. The space station has an international crew, with the use of their time, and that of equipment on the station, being governed by treaties between participant nations. The station is divided into the Russian Orbital Segment, and the US Orbital Segment. Crews are launched to the station via Russian Soyuz missions and US launch vehicles, although the US operated none between the 2011 Space Shuttle retirement and 2018 first crewed launch of SpaceX Dragon 2. The station has been resupplied by cargo spacecraft operated by the US, Russia, European Space Agency, and Japan.

The ISS program concept was formulated in 1993 by the United States and Russia, when their Freedom and Mir-2 station concepts failed for budgetary reasons. The countries also collaborated on the 1993–1998 Shuttle–Mir program. In 1998, the Space Station Intergovernmental Agreement was signed by fifteen countries, representing NASA, Russia's Roscosmos, Canadian Space Agency, Japan's JAXA, and eleven member states of the European Space Agency. ISS assembly began the same year. China expressed interest in the ISS program, but the 2011 Wolf Amendment prohibited most cooperation between NASA and China National Space Administration. In 2014, in response to the Russian annexation of Crimea, NASA ended most relations with Roscosmos, with the major exception of ISS operations. In 2022, the Russian invasion of Ukraine threatened to terminate Russian involvement in the ISS, but as of 2025 there has been no disruption, and all crewed launches continue to have American and Russian members, as well as other nationalities. Russia has committed to ISS operations until at least 2028, and plans to construct the Russian Orbital Service Station from 2027. The US, ESA, Canada, and Japan have committed to ISS operations until 2030, and NASA plans to deorbit the station in 2031, if the replacement Commercial LEO Destinations program has met NASA's needs. As of late 2026, Russia has solidified its operational schedule to maintain its segments on the International Space Station through 2028 while gradually transitioning resources toward its independent station project. Roscosmos has finalized the engineering designs for the initial modules of the Russian Orbital Service Station, with the first core modules now scheduled for orbital deployment in early 2028 to establish an independent low Earth orbit presence before the planned decommissioning of the ISS.

Since the last mission to Mir in 1999, only China has operated other crewed stations. It has crewed the Tiangong space station since 2021, as well the prototypes Tiangong-2 and Tiangong-1.

In 1972, a milestone was reached in co-operation between the United States and the Soviet Union in space with the Apollo-Soyuz Test Project. The project occurred during a period of détente between the two superpowers, and led in July 1975 to Soyuz 19 docking with an Apollo spacecraft.

From 1978 to 1987, the USSR's Interkosmos program included allied Warsaw Pact countries and countries which were not Soviet allies, such as India, Syria, and France, in crewed and uncrewed missions to Space stations Salyut 6 and 7. In 1986, the USSR extended its co-operation to a dozen countries in the Mir program. From 1994 to 1998, NASA Space Shuttles and crew visited Mir in the Shuttle–Mir program.

In 1998, assembly of the space station began. On 28 January 1998, the Space Station Intergovernmental Agreement (IGA) was signed. This governs ownership of modules, station usage by participant nations, and responsibilities for station resupply. The signatories were the United States of America, Russia, Japan, Canada, and eleven member states of the European Space Agency (Belgium, Denmark, France, Germany, Italy, The Netherlands, Norway, Spain, Sweden, Switzerland, and the United Kingdom). With the exception of the United Kingdom, all of the signatories went on to contribute to the Space Station project. A second layer of agreements was then achieved, four memoranda of understanding between NASA and ESA, CSA, RKA and JAXA. These agreements are then further split, such as for the contractual obligations between nations, and trading of partners' rights and obligations. Use of the Russian Orbital Segment is also negotiated at this level.

In 2010, the ESA announced that European countries which were not already part of the program would be allowed access to the station in a three-year trial period.

In March 2012, a meeting in Quebec City between the leaders of the space agencies of Canada, Japan, Russia, the United States, and involved European nations resulted in a renewed pledge to maintain the space station until at least 2020. NASA reports to be still committed to the principles of the mission but also to use the station in new ways, which were not elaborated. CSA President Steve MacLean stated his belief that the station's Canadarm will continue to function properly until 2028, alluding to Canada's likely extension of its involvement beyond 2020.

On 28 March 2015, Russian sources announced that Roscosmos and NASA had agreed to collaborate on the development of a replacement for the current ISS. Igor Komarov, the head of Russia's Roscosmos, made the announcement with NASA administrator Charles Bolden at his side. In a statement provided to SpaceNews on 28 March, NASA spokesman David Weaver said the agency appreciated the Russian commitment to extending the ISS, but did not confirm any plans for a future space station.

On 30 September 2015, Boeing's contract with NASA as prime contractor for the ISS was extended to 30 September 2020. Part of Boeing's services under the contract related to extending the station's primary structural hardware past 2020 to the end of 2028.

There have also been suggestions in the commercial space industry that the station could be converted to commercial operations after it is retired by government entities.

In July 2018, the Space Frontier Act of 2018 was intended to extend operations of the ISS to 2030. This bill was unanimously approved in the Senate, but failed to pass in the U.S. House. In September 2018, the Leading Human Spaceflight Act was introduced with the intent to extend operations of the ISS to 2030, and was confirmed in December 2018.

On 12 April 2021, at a meeting with Russian President Vladimir Putin, then-Deputy Prime Minister Yury Borisov announced he had decided that Russia might withdraw from the ISS programme in 2025. According to Russian authorities, the timeframe of the station’s operations has expired and its condition leaves much to be desired.

In January 2022, NASA announced a planned date of January 2031 to de-orbit the ISS and direct any remnants into a remote area of the South Pacific Ocean.

On 24 February 2022, NASA said that American and Russian astronauts currently aboard the ISS would continue normal operations despite the 2022 Russian invasion of Ukraine. British Prime Minister Boris Johnson commented on the current status of cooperation, saying "I have been broadly in favour of continuing artistic and scientific collaboration, but in the current circumstances it's hard to see how even those can continue as normal." On the same day, Roscosmos Director General Dmitry Rogozin insinuated that Russian withdrawal could cause the International Space Station to de-orbit due to lack of reboost capabilities, writing in a series of tweets, "If you block cooperation with us, who will save the ISS from an unguided de-orbit to impact on the territory of the US or Europe? There's also the chance of impact of the 500-ton construction in India or China. Do you want to threaten them with such a prospect? The ISS doesn't fly over Russia, so all the risk is yours. Are you ready for it?" (The last claim is not true, as the ISS' orbital inclination of 51.66° allows it to overfly the latitude of Saratov.) Rogozin later tweeted that normal relations between ISS partners could only be restored once sanctions have been lifted, and indicated that Roscosmos would submit proposals to the Russian government on ending cooperation. NASA stated that, if necessary, US corporation Northrop Grumman has offered a reboost capability that would keep the ISS in orbit.

On 26 July 2022, Borisov, who had become head of Roscosmos, submitted to Putin his plans for withdrawal from the programme after 2024. However, Robyn Gatens, the NASA official in charge of space station operations, responded that NASA had not received any formal notices from Roscosmos concerning withdrawal plans. The United States Congress, in its CHIPS and Science Act signed by President Joe Biden on 9 August, approved extending NASA's funding for the ISS through 2030.

On 21 September 2022, Borisov stated that Russia was "highly likely" to continue to participate in the ISS programme until 2028, stating that it would be challenging to start up crewed space missions after such a long pause.

On 28 May 2025, former US astronaut and commander of the ISS Terry W. Virts alleged that Russian cosmonauts used the ISS for satellite reconnaissance photography of the Italian Aviano Air Base, where a US Air Force unit and US nuclear gravity bombs are stationed.

== Politics of asteroid mining ==
In recent years, the advancement in technology and engineering have made mining asteroid more plausible. The global space mining market is estimated to be worth $14.71 billion by 2025, as indicated by market research. Although the industry could be years away from successfully mining asteroids, this renewed interest in asteroid mining for metal extraction has the potential to influence the global market of rare metal and create a new geopolitical order.

Outer space has been a ground for geopolitical competition since the Cold War, and the expected growth in asteroid mining could bring about a new geopolitical order organized around resources extraction. Access to rare metals from asteroids could position nation-states and their private sectors competitively. Countries with technological capacity to explore space and finance a new and costly asteroid mining endeavour are better positioned to dominate the global supply chain for such metals, while a handful of countries will lag behind. This threatens to drive a resource race in outer space and could create similar patterns of conflict around resources extraction to what has been experienced on earth.

The expansion of resource extraction in outer space will require the development of a legal regulatory framework that adequately governs asteroid mining activities. The two current treaties that govern activities in outer space are the Outer Space Treaty and the Moon Treaty. Ratified by 98 countries in 1976, the Outer Space Treaty prevents sovereign or private ownership of outer space and its resources, asserting it belongs to all mankind but does not prevent exploitation of its resources. Ratified in 1979, the Moon Treaty clears some of the vague language surrounding the heritage for humankind outline in the Outer Space Treaty. Similar to the Outer Space Treaty, its provisions outline the Moon and other celestial bodies are “not subject to national appropriation by claim of sovereignty, by means of use or occupation, or by any other means” It also introduces a number of provisions that limit activities in outer space. While those provisions have implications for the development of space mining industry, Article 11.7 of the treaty has serious implications for countries that wish to assert monopoly over the emerging asteroid mining industry.

Article 11.7: The main purposes of the international regime to be established shall include:

1. The orderly and safe development of the natural resources of the moon;

2. The rational management of those resources;

3. The expansion of opportunities in the use of those resources;

4. An equitable sharing by all States Parties in the benefits derived from those resources, whereby the interests and needs of the developing countries, as well as the efforts of those countries which have contributed either directly or indirectly to the exploration of the moon, shall be given special consideration.

Given the limitation the Moon treaty place on states, it has not been ratified by key players in the space frontier, such as the US, China, and Russia.

Both the Outer Space Treaty and the Moon Treaty lack a robust enforcement mechanism that holds states and private entities accountable for their violation of the agreements. The lack of clarity over claims for ownership could result in conflicts among countries and private companies. While International efforts to reconsolidate a regulatory framework to govern future mining activities are much needed, they have been slow. Establishing rules on transparency, resource sharing, and mechanisms to guide conflict resolutions are needed to support the growing economy of asteroid mining.

Several countries have conducted research missions to asteroids. While the US, EU, Japan, Russia, and China have all had successful asteroid missions, only the US and Japan were able to bring samples from an asteroid. With geological surveys for metals often preceding the militarization of territories and the expansion of nation-states in terrestrial context, research missions to asteroids allude to the expansion of state ambition to dominate a large-scale extraterrestrial extractive regime.

While asteroid mining remains in its infancy, countries are competing to dominate it. However, the difficulty of reaching consensus on global treaties has led countries to branch out to legitimatize the economic exploration and exploitation of asteroids, through passing national law, and relying on loopholes in the international law.

In 2015, the US passed the U.S Commercial Space Launch Competitiveness Act. While the act does not position the US as a state to have authority or ownership in outer space, it positions its citizens to have ownership over resources acquired from space. This allows the U.S. to adhere to Outer Space Treaty but also allow to its private entities to carry out mining activities on Asteroids, once feasible. AstroForge, a US start-up with a mission focused on developing technology for asteroid mining, announced two commercial missions to asteroids that were launched in 2023.

In 2016, the government of Luxembourg introduced a legal framework that support and guide the private activities of mining asteroids. To grant certainty investors, it passed a law that explicitly permits private entities to own and sell resources extracted from asteroids. The government also pledged to support research and start-ups focused on space exploration and extraterrestrial resource extraction with a funding of approximately US$225 million. Relative to the US, the Luxembourg Space Act provides more clarity and position the country more competitively to engage in asteroid mining. Given its strategic location in Europe, Luxembourg intends to establish itself as a Silicon Valley for space activities.

Despite the differences in passed legislation, the goal remains the same: to emerge as a leader in the new asteroid mining frontier and obtain the economic benefits associated with it. Current and future developments in asteroid mining do not indicate whether competition in this frontier will lead to positive changes in international law or allow for the harmonization of national laws among states. Nevertheless, the steady growth in asteroid mining will have implications for the geopolitics of terrestrial and extraterrestrial resource extraction.

== Representation, participation and regulation ==
Objects launched into space cumulatively by country

Orbital space travelers by country of origin (as of August 17th, 2024)

The participation and representation of all humanity in space is an ongoing issue of human access to (and presence in) space ever since the beginning of spaceflight. Different space agencies, space programs and interest groups such as the International Astronomical Union have been formed supporting or producing humanity's or a particular human presence in space. Representation has been shaped by the inclusiveness, scope and varying capabilities of these organizations and programs.

Some rights of non-spacefaring countries to partake in spaceflight have been secured through international space law, declaring space the "province of all mankind", understanding spaceflight as its resource, though sharing of space for all humanity is still criticized as imperialist and lacking, particularly regarding regulation of private spceflight.

Additionally to international inclusion the inclusion of women, people of colour and with disability has also been lacking. To reach a more inclusive spaceflight some organizations like the Justspace Alliance and IAU featured Inclusive Astronomy have been formed in recent years.

== Colonialism, imperialism and capitalism ==
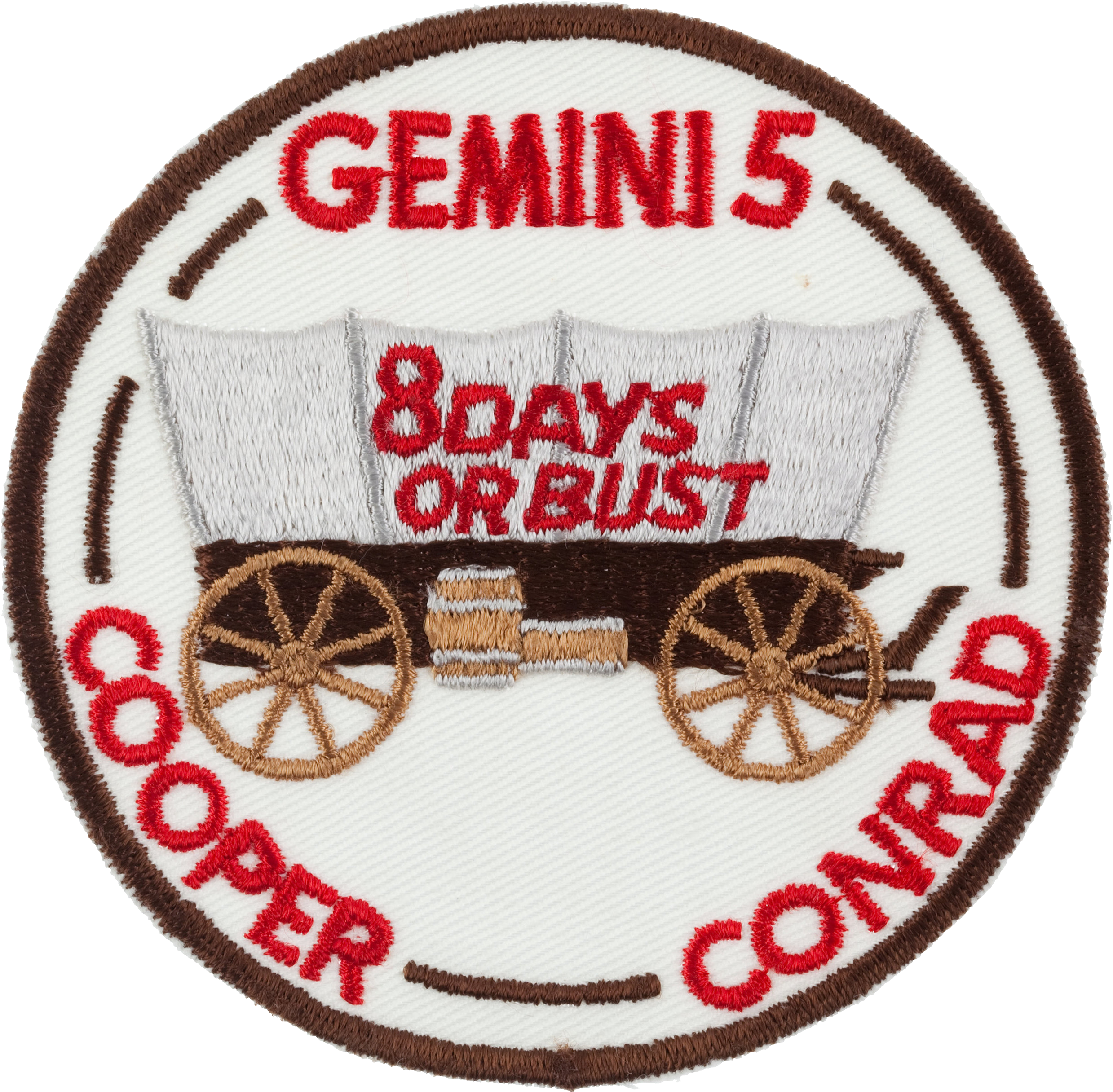
Gemini 5 mission badge (1965) connecting spaceflight to colonial endeavours

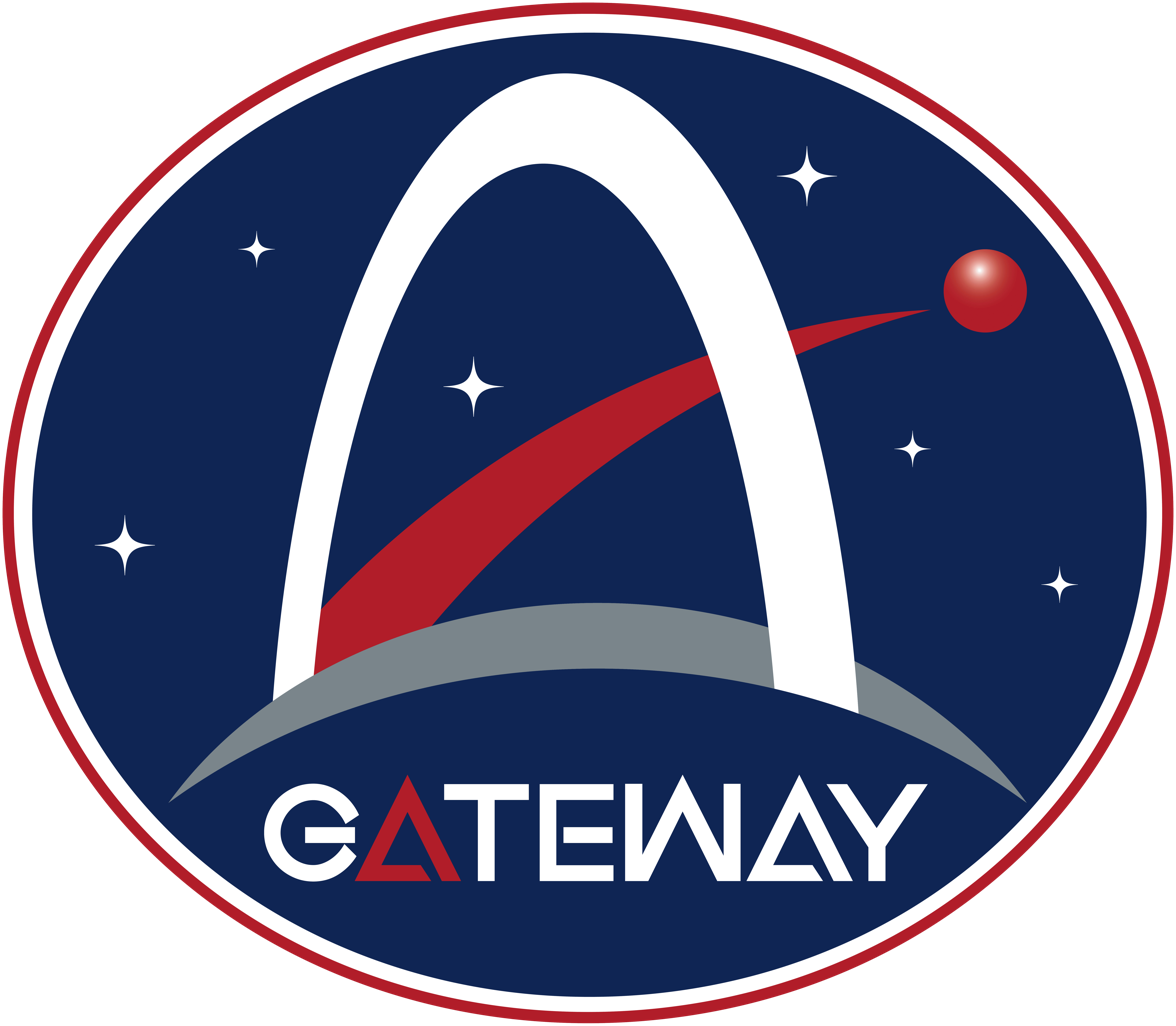
The logo and name of the now cancelled Lunar Gateway references the St. Louis Gateway Arch, which some see as associating Mars with the American frontier and like the Artemis program with the manifest destiny mentality of American settler colonialism.

Space colonization has been discussed as a postcolonial continuation of imperialism and colonialism, with some calling for decolonization instead of colonization. Critics argue that the present politico-legal regimes and their philosophic grounding, advantage imperialist development of space, that key decisionmakers in space colonization are often wealthy elites affiliated with private corporations, and that space colonization would primarily appeal to their peers rather than ordinary citizens. Furthermore, it is argued that there is a need for inclusive and democratic participation and implementation of any space exploration, infrastructure or habitation. According to space law expert Michael Dodge, existing space law, such as the Outer Space Treaty, guarantees access to space, but does not enforce social inclusiveness or regulate non-state actors.

Particularly the narrative of the "New Frontier" has been criticized as unreflected continuation of settler colonialism and manifest destiny, continuing the narrative of exploration as fundamental to the assumed human nature. Joon Yun considers space colonization as a solution to human survival and global problems like pollution to be imperialist; others have identified space as a new sacrifice zone of colonialism.

Furthermore, the understanding of space as empty and separate is considered a continuation of terra nullius.

More specifically the advocacy for territorial colonization of Mars has been called surfacism, in contrast to habitation in the atmospheric space of Venus, a concept similar to Thomas Golds surface chauvinism.

More generally space infrastructure such as the Maunakea Observatories have also been criticized and protested against as being colonialist. Guiana Space Centre has also been the site of anti-colonial protests, connecting colonization as an issue on Earth and in space.

In regard to the scenario of extraterrestrial first contact, it has been argued that the employment of colonial language would endanger such first impressions and encounters.

Furthermore, spaceflight as a whole and space law more particularly has been criticized as a postcolonial project by being built on a colonial legacy and by not facilitating the sharing of access to space and its benefits, too often allowing spaceflight to be used to sustain colonialism and imperialism, most of all on Earth instead.

Space activities entail an environmental costs, which also affect countries that don't participate, prompting questions of environmental justice.

The historical dominance of nations in space activities has progressively been challenged by private companies, such as SpaceX and Blue Origin, which have established profitable businesses primarily by providing satellite launching services. This fast-paced new market led to the expression "NewSpace", to contrast it with the "OldSpace" of the cold war era.

Since the mid-20th century, it has become possible for different actors, such as national armies and government agencies, scientists and private companies, to carry out a variety of space activities, such as the regulation of outer space through international law, the deployment of missile and anti-satellite weapons, the establishment of exploration, communication and navigation satellites, and space travel for tourism and habitat expansion.

== See also ==
- Astrosociology – Field of study
- Extraterrestrial real estate – Ownership claims of property on other planets, moons, or parts of outer space
- Human presence in space – Physical presence of human activity in outer space
- International Space Station – Modular space station in low Earth orbit
- Politics of the International Space Station – How nations operate the orbital research complex
- Space advocacy – Advocacy for exploration and/or colonization of space
- Space policy – Public policy concerning the exploration of outer space
- Space Race – US–USSR spaceflight capability rivalry
- Space warfare – Combat that takes place in outer space
- United Nations Office for Outer Space Affairs – Space agency
- Whitey on the Moon – 1970 spoken word poem by Gil Scott-Heron
