= Marie Schubert =

American artist and illustrator of children's books (1890–1983)

Marie Schubert (1890–1983) was an American commercial artist and an illustrator of children's books in the early 20th century.

== Personal life ==
Marie Tancre Schubert was born on July 23, 1890. Her mother Catherine Bicknell Schubert (born Tancre), was born in Alabama. Her father, Wenzel Joseph Schubert was from South Moravia in what is today the Czech Republic.

Schubert attended the Corcoran School of Art in Washington, DC. Some of her correspondence with an earlier schoolmate, Bertha Ballou, is documented in an online history of Ballou. Schubert's letter from October 30, 1924, notes that her commercial artwork included department store advertising, Christmas cards, and book covers.

In 1917, Schubert married Karl Rathvon, with whom she had a son, Norman, born in Washington, DC in 1920. Schubert and Rathvon divorced in 1923. Her later published works are often attributed to Marie Schubert Frobisher.

In July 1919, Schubert applied for membership in the American Legions USS Jacob Jones Post 2.

In 1922, Schubert was reported in the Washington Times as being a purchaser of land for home building in Lyons Park, a suburb along the Washington-Virginia Railway.

Schubert died in November 1983.

== Creative work ==
=== Standalone books illustrated ===
- Jingles: A Reader for Beginners. By Alice Rose Power. Harr Wagner Publishing Co. 1924.
- Roody and his Underground Palace. By Elsie M. Alexander. 1928.
- Exciting Adventures of Mister Gerald Fox. By Ben Field. 1928
- Indians: Wild and Cruel. By Dennis H. Stovall. Whitman Publishing Co. 1929.
- Cowboys Rough and Ready. By Dennis H. Stovall. 1929
- Pirates, Fierce and Bold. By Dennis H. Stovall. Whitman Publishing Co. 1929.
- Children's Songs for Every Day. By Bernice Frost. American Book Co. 1931.
- Minnie: The Little Fish Who Lived in a Shoe and other Tales. By Ethel Clere Chamberlain. Charles E. Graham. Illustrations by Nell Witters, Marie Schubert, and Julia Green. 1931.
- Mary Jane in Italy. By Clara Ingram Judson. 1933.
- The Frost King, or The Power of Love. By Louisa May Alcott. Grosset & Dunlap. 1939.
- Wee Willie Winkie, An Officer and a Gentleman. By Rudyard Kipling.

=== Books illustrated from Stratemeyer Syndicate series ===
- Honey Bunch: Her First Visit to the Zoo, 1932.
- Honey Bunch: Her First Big Adventure, 1933.
- Honey Bunch: Her First Big Parade, 1934.
- Honey Bunch: Her First Little Mystery, 1935.
- Honey Bunch: Her First Little Circus, 1936.
- Honey Bunch: Her First Little Treasure Hunt, 1937.
- Honey Bunch: Her First Little Club, 1938.
- Honey Bunch: Her First Trip in a Trailer, 1939.
- Honey Bunch: Her First Trip to a Big Fair, 1940.
- Honey Bunch: Her First Twin Playmates, 1941.
- Honey Bunch: Her First Costume Party, 1942.
- The Bobbsey Twins at the Circus. 1927.
- The Bobbsey Twins Solve a Mystery. 1934.
- The Bobbsey Twins in Eskimo Land. 1936.
- The Bobbsey Twins in a Radio Play. 1937
- The Bobbsey Twins at Indian Hollow. 1940.
- The Bobbsey Twins on the Pony Trail. 1940.
- The Bobbsey Twins in Echo Valley. 1943.

=== Books written and illustrated ===
- The Sky is Falling on Henny Penny. 1928.
- Children's Stationery: Noah's Ark Picture Book. 1930.
- Famous Paintings and Their Stories. Grosset & Dunlap. 1934.
- Minute Myths and Legends: Dramatic moments in the affairs of the gods, arch-demons, goddesses, demi-gods and heroes of this and other worlds Grosset & Dunlap. 1934.
- Mother Goose Primer. 1934.
