= USS Chilula =

Tugboat of the United States Navy

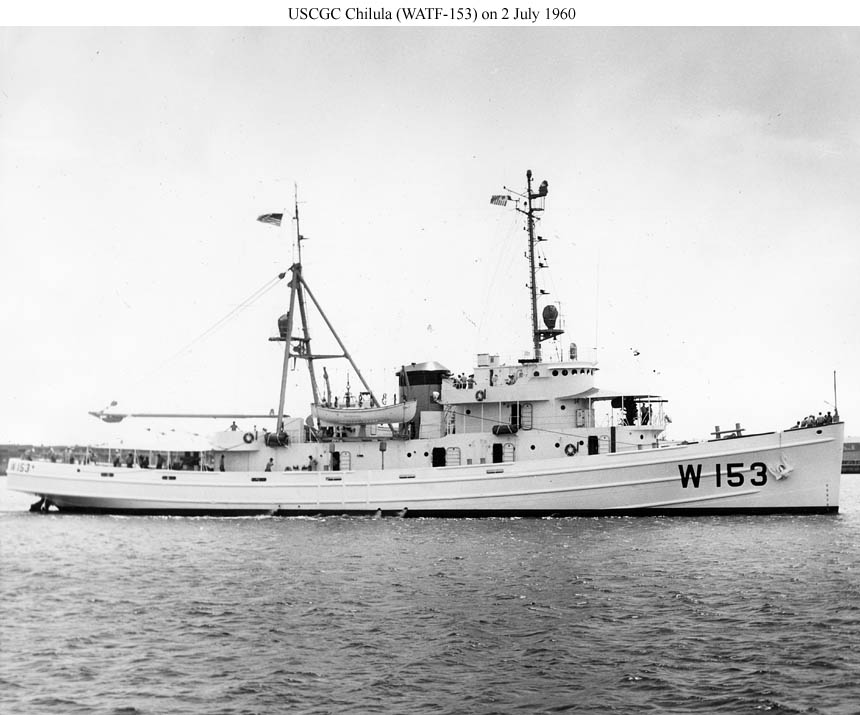
- USCGC Chilula (WMEC-153) underway 2 July 1960, location unknown. The Coast Guard used her primarily for search and rescue.

History

United States
- Name: USS Chilula (ATF-153)
- Namesake: Chilula
- Builder: Charleston Shipbuilding and Dry Dock Co.
- Laid down: 13 June 1944
- Launched: 1 December 1944
- Commissioned: 5 April 1945
- Decommissioned: 8 February 1947
- Reclassified: Fleet ocean tug ATF-153; 15 May 1944
- Recommissioned: USCGC Chilula (WAT-153); 3 October 1956
- Decommissioned: 19 June 1991
- Reclassified: Medium Endurance Cutter Chilula (WMEC-153) 1 May 1966

General characteristics
- Class & type: Navajo-class fleet tug
- Displacement: 1,240 long tons (1,260 t)
- Length: 205 ft (62 m)
- Beam: 38 ft 6 in (11.73 m)
- Draft: 15 ft 4 in (4.67 m); 16 ft 10 in (5.13 m)(max. 1966)
- Propulsion: Diesel-electric; four General Motors 12-278A diesel main engines; single screw; 3,000 shp (2,237 kW)
- Speed: 16.5 knots (30.6 km/h; 19.0 mph)
- Complement: U.S. Navy, 86; U.S. Coast Guard, 7 officers, 1 warrant, 68 enlisted (1961)
- Armament: U.S. Navy; 1 × 3 in (76 mm) gun; 2 × single 40 mm AA guns; 2 × single 20 mm guns AA guns; 2 × depth charge tracks; U.S. Coast Guard; 1 × 3"/50 caliber gun

USS Chilula (ATF-153) was a Navajo-class fleet tug constructed for the United States Navy during World War II. Her purpose was to aid ships, usually by towing, on the high seas or in combat or post-combat areas, plus "other duties as assigned."

== Design ==
International radio call sign of USS Chilula (ATF-153)
November	Papa	India	November

Chilula was laid down 13 June 1944, at Charleston Shipbuilding and Dry Dock Co. in Charleston and launched on 1 December 1944. She was a Cherokee-class fleet ocean tug that was powered by four Allis Chalmers generators driven by four General Electric diesel engines. She had a single propeller.

== History ==
=== U.S. Navy service ===
Chilula was commissioned by the United States Navy on 5 April 1945 and left Norfolk, Virginia on 14 May bound for Algiers, Louisiana, arriving 19 May. She took section 58 of ABSD-7 in tow and sailed on 27 May to Cristobal, Panama. Between 7 June and 14 June she towed sections of ABSD through the Panama Canal. Leaving Balboa, Panama on 16 June she arrived at Eniwetok Atoll on 31 July for towing duty. On 8 September Chilula left for Tokyo Bay, Japan arriving there on 20 September and until 11 January 1946 operated out of Yokosuka, Japan. On 11 January she departed Yokosuka with YO-17 in tow with a destination of Tsingtao, China. On 3 April, Chilula sailed from Yokosuka for Orange, Texas and was placed out of commission in the Atlantic Reserve Fleet on 8 February 1947.

=== Coast Guard service ===
She was transferred to the United States Coast Guard on 9 July 1956 as USCGC Chilula (WAT-153). Her hull number was subsequently changed to WATF-153 later in 1956 and then WMEC-153 in 1966. She was initially assigned to Morehead City, North Carolina and was used for law enforcement and search and rescue duties. In October 1963, Chilula located and took under tow in sixty foot seas the mothballed destroyer escort USS Fogg during Hurricane Ginny and returned her to Virginia Beach, Virginia. The Coast Guard decommissioned her on 19 June 1991 and returned her to the U.S. Navy.
