= Clara Ingram Judson =

American novelist (1879–1960)

- Born: May 4, 1879; Logansport, Indiana
- Died: May 24, 1960 (aged 81); Evanston, Illinois
- Occupation: Writer
- Awards: Children's Literature Legacy Award (1960)

Clara Ingram Judson (May 4, 1879 – May 24, 1960) was an American writer who wrote over 70 children's books. Her work is primarily nonfiction, including several biographies of American presidents. In 1960, she won the second Children's Literature Legacy Award from the Association for Library Service to Children, though she died before she could receive it. The award recognizes a living author or illustrator whose books, published in the United States, have made "a substantial and lasting contribution to literature for children".

== Life ==
Clara Ingram was born on May 4, 1879, in Logansport, Indiana, and married James McIntosh Judson in 1901. Her first book was Flower Fairies, published in 1915. She wrote 19 volumes in the Mary Jane series, between 1918 and 1939. She earned a Newbery Honor three times: in 1951 and 1953 for her presidential biographies Abraham Lincoln, Friend of the People and Theodore Roosevelt, Fighting Patriot; and in 1957 for Mr. Justice Holmes, about Oliver Wendell Holmes Jr.

Judson served as the 15th president of the Illinois Woman's Press Association from June 1923 until June 1925. She wrote pieces that appeared in Ladies' Home Journal, Child Life, The American, and The American Legion Weekly.

Her homemaking economics features over radio station WLS in Chicago debuted in 1928, making her one of the first women "on the air".

She died on May 24, 1960, in Evanston, Illinois, shortly before she would have received the Children's Literature Legacy Award.

The Clara Ingram Judson Award from the Society of Midland Authors, recognizing the most creative writing for children in the midwestern United States, is named after her.

== Awards ==
- Children's Literature Legacy Award, 1960

== Selected works ==
- Flower fairies, illustrated by Maginel Wright Enright (Chicago: Rand McNally, 1915)
- Good-night stories, illus. Clara Powers Wilson (Chicago: A. C. McClurg & Co., 1916)
- Billy Robin and his neighbors, illus. Warner Carr (Rand McNally, 1917)
- Mary Jane's Kindergarten, illus. Frances White (Grosset & Dunlap, 1918)
- The Junior Cook Book (New York, Barse & Hopkins, 1920)
- Mary Jane in Canada, illus. Charles L. Wrenn (NY: Barse & Hopkins, 1924)
- Mary Jane's summer fun, ill. Wrenn (Barse, 1925)
- Virginia Lee, ill. Wrenn (Barse, 1926)
- Mary Jane in Italy, illus. Marie Schubert (NY: Grosset & Dunlap, 1933)
- Mary Jane in Spain, ill. Schubert (Grosset, 1937)
- Abraham Lincoln, Friend of the People (1951)
- Theodore Roosevelt, Fighting Patriot (1953)
- Mr. Justice Holmes (1956)
- Benjamin Franklin (1957)
