= Mr. Justice Holmes =

1956 children's history book

- Author: Clara Ingram Judson
- Illustrator: Robert Todd
- Language: English
- Genre: Children's literature
- Publisher: Follett
- Publication date: 1956
- Publication place: United States

Mr. Justice Holmes is a 1956 children's biography of Oliver Wendell Holmes Jr. written by Clara Ingram Judson and illustrated by Robert Todd. It was a Newbery Honor book in 1957.
