= USS George W. Ingram =

Buckley-class destroyer escort

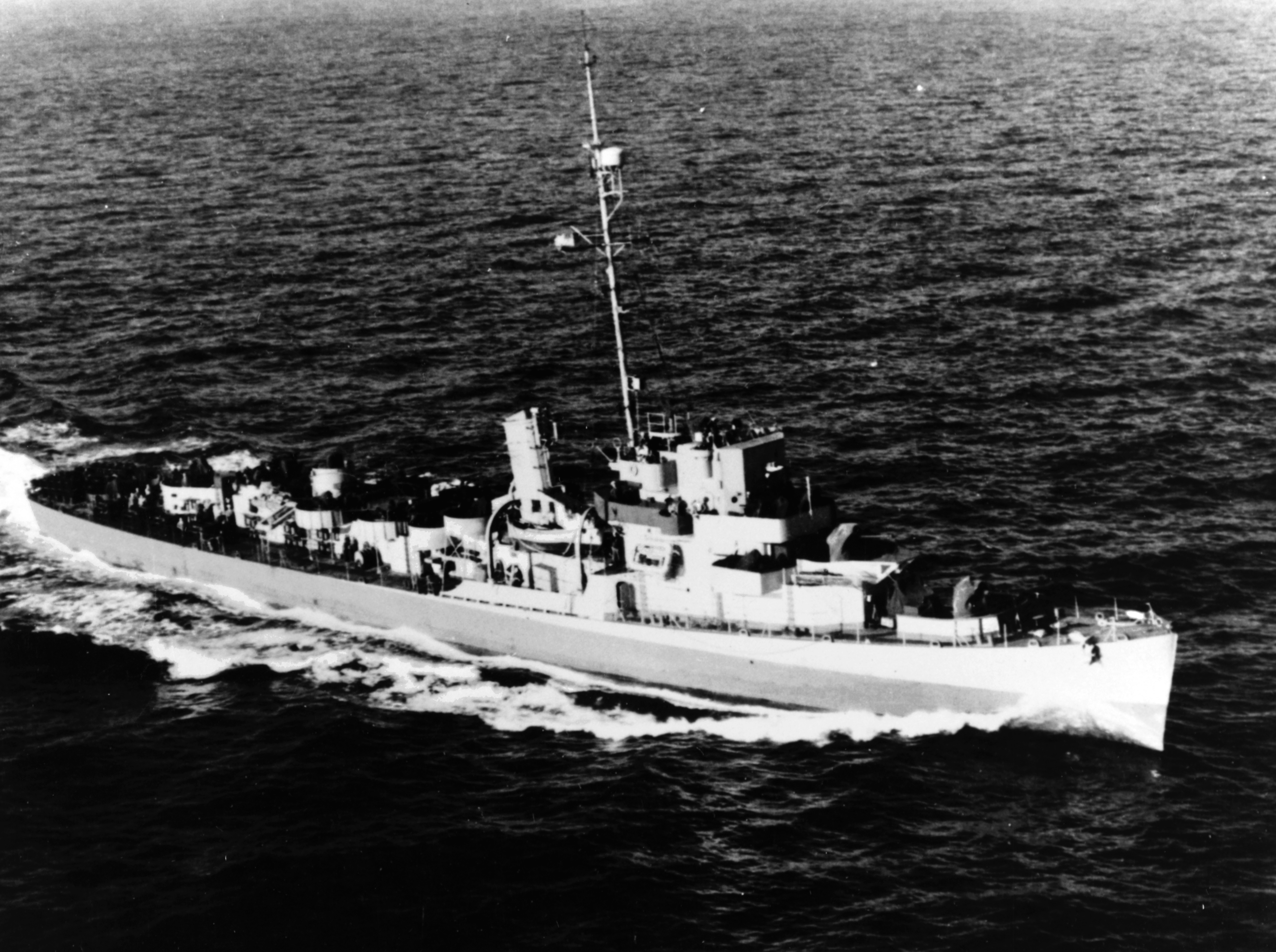

History

United States
- Name: USS George W. Ingram (DE-62)
- Namesake: George Washington Ingram
- Ordered: 1942
- Builder: Bethlehem Hingham Shipyard
- Laid down: 6 February 1943 as Buckley-class destroyer escort
- Launched: 8 May 1943
- Commissioned: 11 August 1943
- Reclassified: APD-43, 23 February 1945
- Decommissioned: 15 January 1947
- Stricken: 1 January 1967
- Fate: Transferred to the Republic of China, 16 May 1967

History

Taiwan
- Name: ROCS Kang Shan (DE-43)
- Acquired: 16 May 1967
- Reclassified: PF-43
- Stricken: 1978
- Fate: Broken up, 1979

General characteristics
- Class & type: Buckley-class destroyer escort
- Displacement: 1,400 long tons (1,422 t) light; 1,740 long tons (1,768 t) standard
- Length: 306 ft (93 m)
- Beam: 37 ft (11 m)
- Draft: 9 ft 6 in (2.90 m) standard; 11 ft 3 in (3.43 m) full load
- Propulsion: 2 × boilers; General Electric turbo-electric drive; 12,000 shp (8.9 MW); 2 × solid manganese-bronze 3,600 lb (1,600 kg) 3-bladed propellers, 8 ft 6 in (2.59 m) diameter, 7 ft 7 in (2.31 m) pitch; 2 × rudders; 359 tons fuel oil
- Speed: 23 knots (43 km/h; 26 mph)
- Range: 3,700 nmi (6,900 km) at 15 kn (28 km/h; 17 mph); 6,000 nmi (11,000 km) at 12 kn (22 km/h; 14 mph)
- Complement: 15 officers, 198 men
- Armament: 3 × 3-inch/50-caliber guns; 1 × quad 1.1-inch/75-caliber gun; 8 × single 20 mm guns; 1 × triple 21 inch (533 mm) torpedo tubes; 1 × Hedgehog anti-submarine mortar; 8 × K-gun depth charge projectors; 2 × depth charge tracks

USS George W. Ingram (DE-62/APD-43) was a Buckley-class destroyer escort in service with the United States Navy from 1943 to 1947. In 1967, she was transferred to Taiwan, serving as Kang Shan until being scrapped in 1979.

== History ==
George W. Ingram was named in honor of Seaman George Washington Ingram (1918–1941), who was killed in action during the Japanese attack on the Hawaiian Islands. She laid down on 6 February 1943 at the Bethlehem-Hingham Shipyard, Inc., in Hingham, Massachusetts; launched on 8 May 1943, sponsored by Mrs. James L. Ingram, mother of Seaman Second Class Ingram, and commissioned on 11 August 1943.

=== World War II, 1943–1945 ===
After shakedown off Bermuda, George W. Ingram departed New York on 13 October for convoy escort duty in the Atlantic. Steaming via the West Indies, she escorted a supply convoy to North Africa, where she arrived at Algiers, Algeria, on 7 November. She departed four days later, as convoy escort, and returned via the West Indies and the Panama Canal Zone to New York, arriving on 4 December. Between 26 December 1943 and 12 July 1944, she made five round-trip trans-Atlantic escort voyages (four from New York and one from Boston) to Northern Ireland.

After additional escort duty along the eastern seaboard, she departed Charleston, South Carolina, on 6 November to escort slow-moving convoy CK-4 to Plymouth, England. She arrived on 5 December, then sailed a week later, escorting ships and landing craft damaged during the Normandy invasion, back to the United States. On 20 December, U-870 attacked the slow-moving convoy northeast of the Azores, sinking LST-359 and damaging the destroyer escort Fogg (DE-57); but prompt action by the escorts drove off the U-boat, preventing further damage. George W. Ingram reached New York on 12 January 1945.

After escorting a captured Italian submarine from Portsmouth, New Hampshire to New London, Connecticut, George W. Ingram was re-designated APD-43 on 23 February. During the next few months, she underwent conversion to a Charles Lawrence-class high speed transport at the Tompkinsville, Staten Island Naval Base in Tompkinsville, New York. Shortly after V-E Day, she departed New York and sailed via the Panama Canal and San Diego to Pearl Harbor, where she arrived on 20 June for training with Underwater Demolition Teams.

With UDT-26 embarked, she departed Pearl Harbor on 24 August and sailed via Eniwetok and Okinawa to Jinsen, Korea, where on 8 September, she supported the initial landings of American occupation troops in Korea. She steamed to Taku Bar, China, on 26 September, and from 29 September to 1 October, UDT-26 surveyed and sounded the approaches of the Hai River in preparation for landings by the III Marine Amphibious Corps. She supported additional landings by American troops at Yantai and Qingdao, China, before departing Qingdao on 17 October. She steamed via Okinawa, Eniwetok, and Pearl Harbor to the West Coast, arriving at San Diego on 11 November.

=== Decommissioning and sale to the Republic of China ===
Remaining at San Diego, George W. Ingram decommissioned on 15 January 1947, and entered the Pacific Reserve Fleet at Bremerton, Washington. George W. Ingram was struck from the Navy List on 1 January 1967.

Acquired by the Republic of China Navy on 19 September 1967, ex-George W. Ingram was commissioned as frigate ROCS Kang Shan (PF-43). With a different hull number, 323, she was discarded in 1978.
