= Children's Literature Legacy Award =

Prize for writers or illustrators of children's books

- Awarded for: "substantial and lasting contributions to children's literature"
- Country: United States
- Presented by: Association for Library Service to Children, a division of the American Library Association
- First award: 1954
- Website: ala.org/alsc/awardsgrants/bookmedia/clla/about

The Children's Literature Legacy Award (formerly the Laura Ingalls Wilder Medal or Wilder Award) is a prize awarded by the Association for Library Service to Children (ALSC), a division of the American Library Association (ALA), to writers or illustrators of children's books published in the United States who have, over a period of years, made substantial and lasting contributions to children's literature. The bronze medal prize was originally named after its first winner, twentieth-century American author Laura Ingalls Wilder, before being renamed in 2018.

Originally, the Laura Ingalls Wilder Medal was awarded every five years, awarding six prizes between 1955 and 1980. From 1980 to 2001 it was awarded every three years, awarding seven prizes. From 2001 to 2015 it was awarded every two years. It is now awarded annually. The most recent author to receive the award was Candace Fleming in 2026.

== Criteria ==
- The medal may be awarded to an author or illustrator including co-authors or co-illustrators, and persons who both write and illustrate. The person may be nominated posthumously.
- Some portion of the nominee's active career in books for children must have occurred in the twenty-five years prior to nomination.
- Citizenship or residence of the potential nominee is not to be considered.
- The nominee's work must be published in the United States but this does not mean that the first publication had to be in the United States. Books by the nominee that have been published in the United States are to be considered in the nomination process.
- Some of the books by the potential nominee must have been available to children for at least ten years.
- The books, by their nature or number, occupy an important place in literature for American children, and children have read the books, and the books continue to be requested and read by children.
- The committee is to direct its attention only to the part of the nominee's total work that is books for children (up to and including age fourteen).

== Renaming ==
In February 2018, the Association for Library Service to Children (ALSC), the division of ALA that administers the award, announced a taskforce which re-examined the naming of the award and included representation from the American Indian Library Association (AILA). The task force was convened because of criticism of Wilder's depictions of Native and African Americans. A recommendation to rename the award was made on June 23, 2018. The ALSC board found Wilder's body of work "includes expressions of stereotypical attitudes inconsistent with ALSC's core values of inclusiveness, integrity and respect, and responsiveness." The award's name was officially changed to the "Children's Literature Legacy Award."

== Recipients ==
Children's Literature Legacy Award winners
Year	Author
2026	Candace Fleming
2025	Carole Boston Weatherford
2024	Pam Muñoz Ryan
2023	James E. Ransome
2022	Grace Lin
2021	Mildred D. Taylor
2020	Kevin Henkes
2019	Walter Dean Myers
2018	Jacqueline Woodson
2017	Nikki Grimes
2016	Jerry Pinkney
2015	Donald Crews
2013	Katherine Paterson
2011	Tomie dePaola
2009	Ashley Bryan
2007	James Marshall
2005	Laurence Yep
2003	Eric Carle
2001	Milton Meltzer
1998	Russell Freedman
1995	Virginia Hamilton
1992	Marcia Brown
1989	Elizabeth George Speare
1986	Jean Fritz
1983	Maurice Sendak
1980	Theodor S. Geisel (Dr. Seuss)
1975	Beverly Cleary
1970	E. B. White
1965	Ruth Sawyer
1960	Clara Ingram Judson
1954	Laura Ingalls Wilder

== See also ==
- List of ALA awards
- Caldecott Medal
- Newbery Medal
- Margaret A. Edwards Award
