= Ingham, Nebraska =

- Former community
- Location within the state of Nebraska
- Coordinates: 40°43′59″N 100°20′18″W
- Country: United States
- State: Nebraska
- County: Lincoln
- Time zone: UTC-6 (Central)
  - Summer (DST): UTC-5 (Central)
- GNIS feature ID: 1838507

Ingham was a community in Lincoln County, Nebraska, United States, established in 1886 by the Chicago, Burlington and Quincy Railroad. Ingham was located near today's Highway 23, its location chosen as a rare level spot between the small villages of Farnam and Moorefield. Earliest settlers were dryland farmers and ranchers. The settlement became of sufficient size that a post office was secured in 1898. Ingham had a high school that graduated its first class in 1924.

In addition to agricultural activities, Ingham developed a silica mining industry.

The settlement went into decline in the 1920s. The silica facilities moved to Eustis in 1928, and improved roads meant local farmers were able to transact business in larger markets. By the 1950s, the settlement had disappeared. Today, only a few building foundations, along with abandoned wagons and agricultural equipment, remain as evidence that this community ever existed. Nebraska State Historical Marker #286 memorializes the memory of the town.
