= Karen Sosnoski =

American author and filmmaker

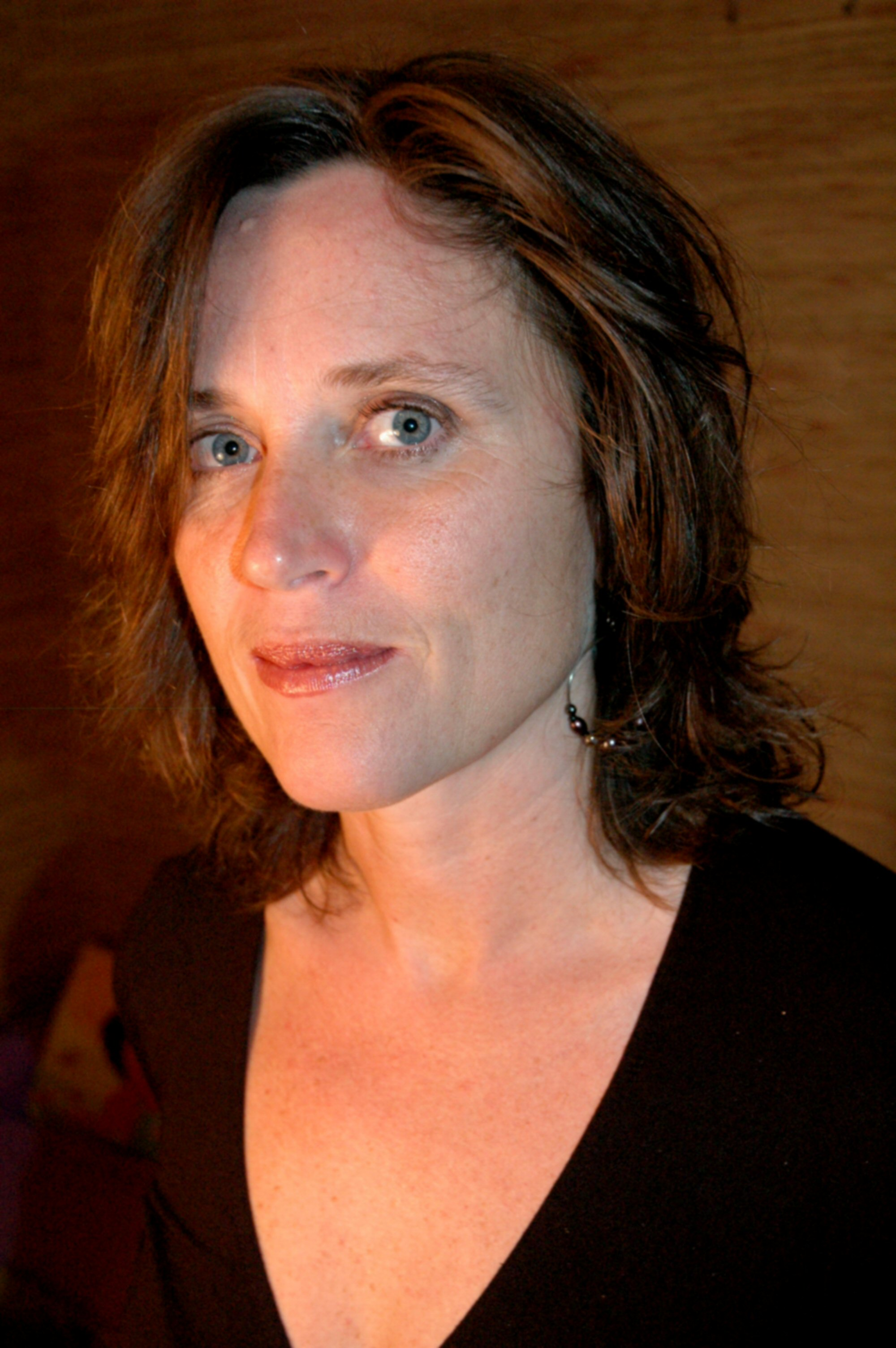
- Sosnoski in 2008

Karen Sosnoski (born November 30, 1964) is an American author, radio contributor, and documentary filmmaker.

== Career ==
Sosnoski is working on a novel, Rosemary's Models, about the intimate secrets, hopes, and fears that cause men, women, and even children to plunge hopefully into artistic relationships with a wood engraver, craving, and in some cases commissioning her unsettling vision. This literary fiction is inspired by the real art of Rosemary Feit Covey.

Sosnoski's stories have been featured by the New York Times, This American Life, Los Angeles Times, and Studio 360. Her work has appeared or is forthcoming in Identity Theory, decomP, Word Riot, The Chaffey Review, Camroc Press Review, Yellow Mama, The LA Times, Poets and Writers, The Washington City Paper, and Bitch, among others. Her article, "Speak Now or Forever Hold Your Peace: The Filming of Wedding Advice," is published in the anthology, Thinking Straight, edited by Chrys Ingraham.

Sosnoski holds a B.A. from Gettysburg College, an M.A. in English from Boston College, a Ph.D. in English and American Literature from Brandeis University and a certificate in Non-Fiction Writing from the Salt Institute for Documentary Studies. She has taught English and Writing at Brandeis University, Georgetown University, The George Washington University, The Graduate School, USDA and Montgomery College.

Karen was awarded an Avid Film Camp editing grant to direct the editing of her the documentary film Wedding Advice: Speak Now or Forever Hold Your Peace (2002) from June through September, 2001. The film was screened at 18 film festivals and is being distributed by Berkeley Media, LLC.

== Creative Writing ==
- “My 83 Year Old Father’s Wedding and New Life” - New York Times (September 2020)
- “DeVos' Confirmation Would Ruin My Son's Future” - (Romper 2017)
- "Unstopped Charlie" - Boundoff Audio Magazine (November 2010)
- "The_____Trip" – radioactive moat (March 2010)
- "Garrett Surviving" – Yellow Mama (February 2010)
- Word Riot (November 2009)
- The Chaffey Review (Fall 2009) print only/not available online
- "Daughter off the Cross" – Identity Theory (webzine) (October 2009)
- "Seeing Anton" – decomP: a literary magazine (October 2009)
- "Special Days" – Camroc Press Review (2009)
- "Shining hope for her son with Down syndrome" – Los Angeles Times (2008)
- "Sense of Tumor" – Washington City Paper (2006)
- "Sleeping Ills" – Washington City Paper (2006)
- "Todd Parr, Author of Our Family Bible" – Alternatives to Marriage Project (2004) no longer available online
- "Grateful for Second Chances" – Electric Dreams (1997)

== Film ==
- Wedding Advice: Speak Now or Forever Hold Your Peace (2002)

== Podcasts ==
- "Unstopped Charlie" - Boundoff Audio Magazine (November 2010)
- Word Riot (November 2009)
