= Engram =

Engram may refer to:

- Engram (neuropsychology), a physical means by which memory traces are stored
- Engram (Dianetics), a term used in Scientology and Dianetics for a "recording" of a past painful event not normally accessible to the conscious mind
- Engram (album), a 2009 album by black metal band Beherit
- Engram (film), a 2014 short film

== People with the surname Engram ==
- Bobby Engram, American football player
- Bryan Engram, Canadian football player
- Evan Engram, American football player

== See also ==
- N-gram
- Ingram (disambiguation)
- Enneagram (disambiguation)
