= Patricia Ingraham =

Patricia Wallace Ingraham is founding dean of the College of Community and Public Affairs at Binghamton University and a former Distinguished Professor of Public Administration at the Maxwell School, Syracuse University.

== Education ==
She received her B.A. from Macalester College, an M.A. from Michigan State University, and her Ph.D. from Binghamton University.

== Awards ==
In 2001, she received ASPA's Dwight Waldo Award. In 2004, she received the American Political Science Association's John Gaus Award.

== Publications ==
- In 1990 Ingraham was elected as a fellow of the National Academy of Public Administration.
- Government Performance: Why Management Matters, with Philip Joyce and Amy Kneedler Donahue (Baltimore: The Johns Hopkins University Press, in press).
- Transforming Government: Lessons from the Federal Reinvention Laboratories, co-edited with James Thompson and Ronald Sanders (San Francisco: Jossey-Boss, 1997).
- Civil Service Reform: Building a Government That Works with Donald Kettl, Ronald Sanders, and Constance Horner (Washington, DC: The Brookings Institution, 1996).
- The Foundation of Merit (Baltimore: The Johns Hopkins University Press, 1995).
- New Paradigms for Government: Issues for the Changing Public Service co-edited with Barbara Romzek (San Francisco: Jossey-Bass, 1994).
- Readings in Contemporary Administration co-edited with David Rosenbloom (New York: McGraw Hill, 1994).
- The Promise and Paradox of Civil Service Reform co-edited with David Rosenbloom (Pittsburgh: University of Pittsburgh Press, 1992).
- An Agenda For Excellence: The American Public Service co-edited with Donald Kettl (Chatham, NJ: Chatham House, 1992).
- Legislating Bureaucratic Change: The Civil Service Reform Act of 1978, co-edited with Carolyn Ban, (Albany: SUNY Press, 1984).
- Building Government's Capacity to Perform: The Role of Management, Johns Hopkins
- Review of Public Personnel Administration, The Journal of Public Human Resource Management
- Ingraham, Patricia W., Yilin Hou, and Donald Moynihan. "Capacity, Management, and Performance: Exploring the Links." August, 2001. Paper presented at the American Political Science Conference, San Francisco, CA, August 30-September 2, 2001.
- Kneedler, Amy, and Patricia W. Ingraham. "Dissecting the Black Box Revisited: A Refined Model of Government Management Performance and the Application of Criteria-based Assessment." April, 1999. Paper presented at the Workshop on Models and Methods for Empirical Study of Governance and Public Management, Tucson, AZ, April 29 – May 1, 1999.
- Kneedler, Amy, and Patricia W. Ingraham. "Dissecting the Black Box: Toward a Model and Measures of Government Management Performance." October, 1997. Paper presented at the 4th National Public Management Research Conference, Athens, GA, October 30 –November 1, 1997.
- Selden, Sally Coleman, Patricia W. Ingraham, and Willow Jacobson. "Human Resource Practices in State Governments: Findings from a National Survey." April, 1999. Paper presented at the 60th National Conference of the American Society for Public Administration, Orlando, FL, 10–14 April 1999.
- Selden, Sally Coleman, Amy Kneedler, and Patricia W. Ingraham. "Measuring Government Management Capacity: A Comparative Analysis of City Human Resources Management Systems." December, 1999. Paper presented at the 5th National Public Management Conference, College Station, TX, December 1999.
- Kneedler, Amy, Sally Coleman Selden, and Patricia W. Ingraham. "Measuring Government Management Performance: A Comparative Analysis of Human Resources Management Systems." December, 1999. Presented at the 5th National Public Management Research Conference, College Station, TX, 3–4 December 1999.
