= Ernst Hechler =

German World War II U-boat commander

- Born: 21 November 1907; Lauterbach, German Empire
- Died: 23 October 1965 (aged 57); Alzey, West Germany
- Military career
- Allegiance: Weimar Republic (to 1933); Nazi Germany
- Branch: Reichsmarine; Luftwaffe; Kriegsmarine
- Service years: 1929–45
- Rank: Korvettenkapitän
- Commands: U-870
- Conflicts: World War II: Battle of the Atlantic
- Awards: Knight's Cross of the Iron Cross

Ernst Hechler (21 November 1907 – 23 October 1965) was a German bomber pilot and U-boat commander in World War II. He was a recipient of the Knight's Cross of the Iron Cross of Nazi Germany. Hechler is credited with the sinking of four ships for a total of 13,804 gross register tons (GRT), and with damaging one destroyer escort.

Hechler joined the Reichsmarine (navy of the Weimar Republic) in 1928. After a period of training on surface vessels he transferred to the Luftwaffe (air force) in 1935. During World War II he flew 65 combat missions as a bomber pilot, the majority of which were in mine-laying operations. Following his voluntary transfer back to the Kriegsmarine in 1943 he took command of German submarine U-870 in 1944 which he took on one war patrol. He claimed to have sunk five ships for a total of 15,069 GRT. These claims were acknowledged by the presentation of the Knight's Cross of the Iron Cross.

== Career ==
Ernst Hechler was born on 21 November 1907 in Lauterbach in Hesse-Nassau, then a province of the Kingdom of Prussia. He joined the German Merchant Marine (Deutsche Handelsmarine) in 1926. He began his pilot training in 1928 at the German Air Transport School (Deutsche Verkehrsfliegerschule) at Schleißheim (28 May 1928 – 15 July 1928) and Warnemünde (16 July 1928 – 24 March 1929). Hechler joined the military service of the Weimar Republic in the Reichsmarine on 1 April 1929 and became a member of "Crew 1929" (the incoming class of 1929). After he underwent basic military training in the 4th company, 2nd department (4. Kompanie/II. Abteilung) of the standing ship division (Schiffsstammdivision) of the Baltic Sea in Stralsund (1 April 1929 – 30 June 1926), he was transferred to the training ship Niobe (1 July 1929 – 11 October 1929) attaining the rank of Seekadett (Naval Cadet) on 10 October 1929. Hechler was transferred on 12 October to the 3rd company (3. Kompanie) of the Naval Academy Mürwik in Flensburg-Mürwik before going on a half year stay on board the light cruiser Emden (6 January 1930 – 21 May 1930), which was immediately followed by a seven months stay on to the light cruiser Karlsruhe (22 May 1930 – 19 December 1930).

Emden at the time was under the command of Lothar von Arnauld de la Perière, a U-boat commander during World War I. Hechler sailed on Emden's third training cruise, which started on 13 January 1930 and took him and her crew to Madeira, Saint Thomas, New Orleans, Kingston/Jamaica, San Juan/Puerto Rico, Charlestown and back to Germany via Las Palmas and Santa Cruz. They returned to Wilhelmshaven on 13 May 1930. Karlsruhe's first training cruise left Kiel 24 May 1930 and took its crew through the Suez Canal via the Mediterranean Sea. They then proceeded down Africa's east coast, around the Cape of Good Hope to the Angra Pequena and the Walvis Bay. The cruise continued to Lobito, Angola, where they stopped before heading to South America, from here they headed back to Germany via Vigo, Spain. They arrived back in Kiel on 12 December 1930. Following these assignments he advanced in rank to Fähnrich zur See (officer cadet) on 1 January 1931.

On 1 September 1934 Hechler was promoted to Oberleutnant zur See (First Lieutenant). He was released from the Reichsmarine on 30 April 1935 and transferred to the newly formed Luftwaffe. Prior to this assignment on 30 January 1933, the Nazi Party, under the leadership of Adolf Hitler, came to power in Germany, ushering in a period of rearmament. In 1935, the Reichsmarine was renamed the Kriegsmarine. On 1 May 1935 his naval rank was re-designated to Oberleutnant of the Luftwaffe. Hechler was appointed Ia (operations officer) in the headquarters unit (Stab) of the 9th Air Division (Sea) (9. Fliegerdivision (See)) on 28 August 1939 before taking command of the 2nd squadron of 126th bomber group (2./Kampfgruppe 126) on 7 September 1940. The unit was re-designated to 2./Kampfgeschwader 28 in December 1940. (Note: For an explanation of Luftwaffe unit designations see Organisation of the Luftwaffe during World War II.) In the timeframe September 1940 to March 1941 Hechler flew a total of 62 combat missions on the Heinkel He 111 with this unit. (Note: In total Hechler flew 65 combat missions as a bomber pilot. The majority of these missions had a duration of more than four hours and were counted double.) The majority of these missions were mine-laying sorties over coastal waters.

On 1 July 1943 Hechler was transferred back to the Kriegsmarine at his own request attaining the rank of Korvettenkapitän on 3 July. Until January 1944 he underwent a number of training courses for submarine commanders at the 2nd submarine training division (2. U-Boot-Lehr-Division), torpedo school (Torpedoschule Flensburg-Mürwik), the Naval anti-aircraft warfare school II (Marine-Flakschule II) and the 24th U-boat Flotilla. Hechler was stationed in Bremen from 3 January to 2 February 1944 for construction training (Baubelehrung) of U-870, a Type IXC/40 submarine. He took command of the boat on 3 February which was subordinated to the 4th U-boat Flotilla until 30 September 1944 when it was transferred to the 33rd U-boat Flotilla on 1 October. Hechler's chief engineer on U-870 was Knight's Cross recipient Johann-Friedrich Wessels, who joined the crew on 14 August 1944. Wessels had served on U-47 under the command of Günther Prien and was involved in the sinking of HMS Royal Oak, and on U-198 under the command of Werner Hartmann.

Hechler took U-870 on one war patrol. U-870 had left Kiel, Germany on 31 October 1944 before arriving in Horten, Norway on 3 November. U-870 left Horten again on 10 November returning to Kristiansand, Norway on 20 February 1945. Here the boat departed again on 25 February returning to Flensburg, Germany on 27 February. During this war patrol Hechler mission was to radio back weather reports from the Gibraltar-Azores area in preparation for the Battle of the Bulge which he failed to reach on time. He also claimed the destruction of five ships totaling 15,069 GRT and was awarded the Knight's Cross of the Iron Cross (German: Ritterkreuz des Eisernen Kreuzes) on 21 January 1945. (Note: According to Kaiser, Hechler claimed to have sunk six ships for a total of 29,000 GRT and two corvettes.) U-870 was sunk in Bremen in an Allied air raid on 30 March 1945. In the final weeks of the war Hechler served as operations officer on the staff of the Befehlshaber der U-Boote (supreme commander of submarines). Ernst Hechler died on 23 October 1965 aged 57 in Alzey, Federal Republic of Germany.

== Awards ==
- Pilotenabzeichen (30 July 1935)
- Combined Pilots-Observation Badge (21 November 1935)
- Wehrmacht Long Service Award 4th Class (2 October 1936)
- Sudetenland Medal (20 August 1939)
- Iron Cross (1939) 2nd Class (23 May 1940) & 1st Class (25 October 1940)
- Front Flying Clasp of the Luftwaffe for Combat Flyers, in Silver (15 March 1941) & in Gold (15 July 1941)
- Knight's Cross of the Iron Cross on 21 January 1945 as Korvettenkapitän and commander of U-870
- U-boat War Badge (1939) (27 February 1945)
- U-boat Front Clasp in Bronze (27 February 1945)
