= Astrosociology =

Field of study

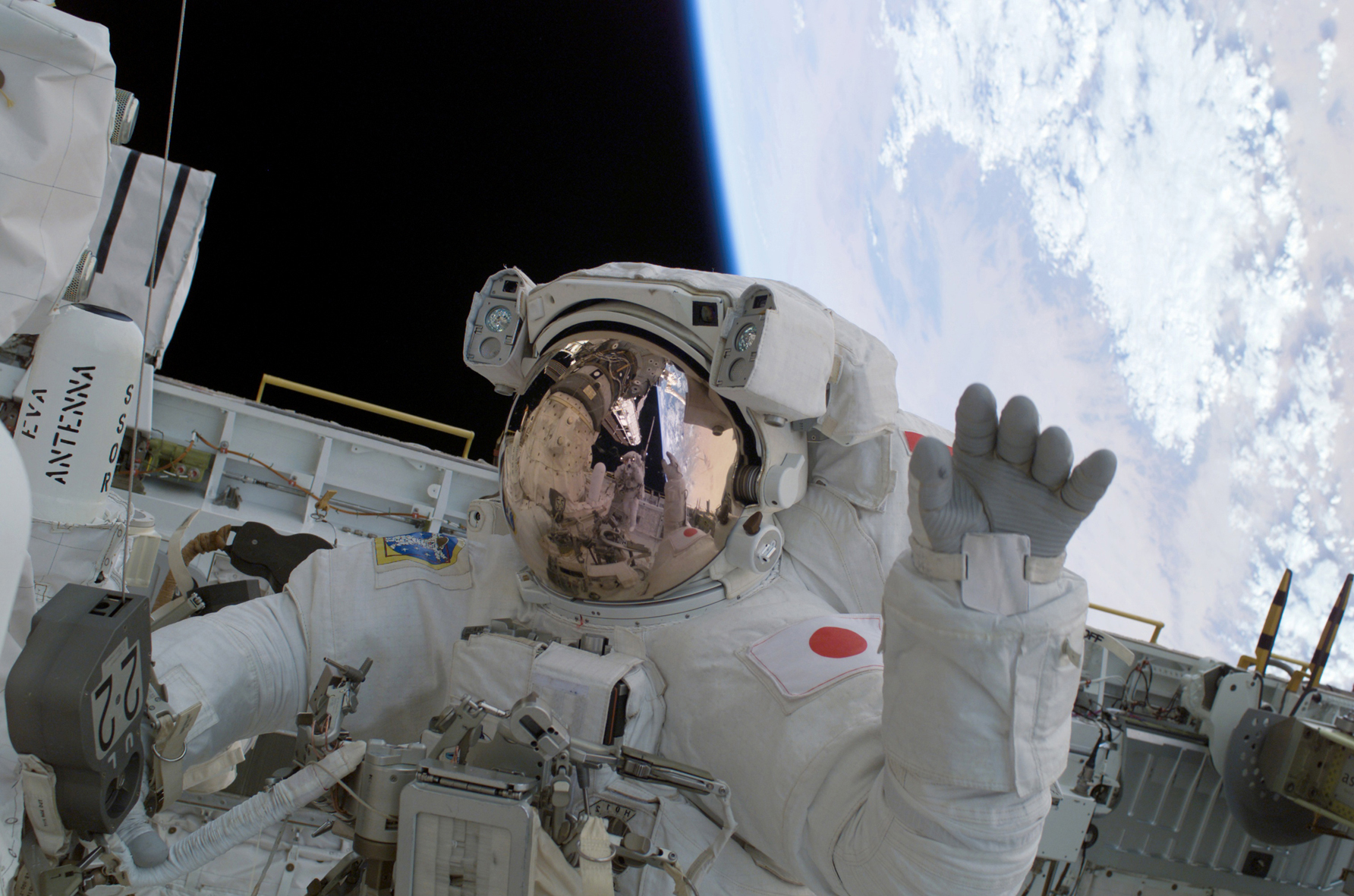
Japanese astronaut Soichi Noguchi waves during STS-114 mission.

Astrosociology, sociology of outer space, or sociology of the universe is the study of the relationship between outer space, extraterrestrial places, and the wider universe and society. It is an interdisciplinary study between space-related sciences and sociology that seeks to understand the impact of human society outside our current planetary system.

Astrosociology focuses on space exploration and related issues alongside the social and cultural dimensions of outer space from the viewpoint of human civilisation.

== History ==
Astrosociology started as a subfield and interdisciplinary area of study in 2003 to research the two-way relationship that exists between outer space and society, or astrosocial phenomena (e.g. the social, cultural, and behavioral patterns related to outer space).

In 2008, Jim Pass created the Astrosociology Research Institute (ARI) as a nonprofit research centre to advance the field of astrosociology.

== Research areas ==
=== Commercialisation of space ===
The process and phenomenon of globalisation can be seen to be expanding past the planetary system and into space commercialisation. Capitalist, including neoliberal, points of view are that space is an untapped resource for marketisation. This presents a shift from the Space Race and astropolitics of the Cold War and into a new era of space commercialisation. Examples of this are Blue Origin and SpaceX that offer private contract services for government agencies like NASA.

=== Extraterrestrial life ===
The existence of extraterrestrial life, life outside of Earth, is an ongoing scientific search as well as societal debate. Astrobiology to planetary geology are some of the disciplines interested in finding life elsewhere in space. Astrosociology intersects these by exploring the social dimensions of finding extraterrestrial life – exploring the impact of human systems throughout religious to economic.

There is also research into how these extraterrestrial places and potential life interlink with our own world, with the global environmental and ecological systems here on Earth, and vice versa. This potential relationship of space and extraterrestrial places impacting our society, humanity, and humans as we know ourselves alongside our impact elsewhere plays an ongoing astrosociologcial paradigm within research.

=== Human civilisations beyond Earth ===
A focus of astrosociology is the presence of human populations outside the confines of Earth. In 2006, Jim Pass predicted this as being likely, stating, "For a number of reasons, the construction of a single space colony represents a future social reality strongly likely to play itself out repeatedly as the twenty-first century advances".

Social systems beyond Earth will be affected by the technology involved, including programmes like SpaceX and Deep Space Transport. Time will be considered a question of study for astrosociology, in the sense that the social representation and understanding of time and how the passing of time is understood outside of the day-night cycle here on Earth.

Human existence outside of Earth is expected to create new areas of astrosocial and astropolitical dimensions that human societies. Public perceptions of space are considered as a subtopic of astrosociology. The transition from beyond-Earth human existence being seen as external to society to it being seen as part of society is a question to be studied in astrosociology.

=== Space exploration ===
Understanding future expansion into places like the Moon, Mars, and elsewhere outside of Earth needs a reflection on the sociological factors throughout exploration phases. An example of this is looking at past space explorations and social dynamics, from leadership relations among astronauts to work-rest scheduling, to provide sociological insight into future space exploration missions. As humans remain in an era phase of space exploration and travel, the astrosociological focus is often on the micro societal aspects of space that are created in situations like the International Space Station and future space missions.

== See also ==
- Human spaceflight – Spaceflight with a crew or passengers
- Human presence in space – Physical presence of human activity in outer space
- Space – Framework of distances and directions
- Politics of outer space – Political considerations of space policy
