= Abraham Lincoln, Friend of the People =

Book by Clara Ingram Judson

- First edition
- Author: Clara Ingram Judson
- Language: English
- Subject: US History
- Publisher: Wilcox and Follett
- Publication date: 1950
- Publication place: United States
- Pages: 206
- LC Class: E457.905 .J8

Abraham Lincoln, Friend of the People by Clara Ingram Judson is a children's book first published in 1950 which was a Newbery Honor recipient in 1951.
