= USS Fogg =

Buckley-class destroyer escort

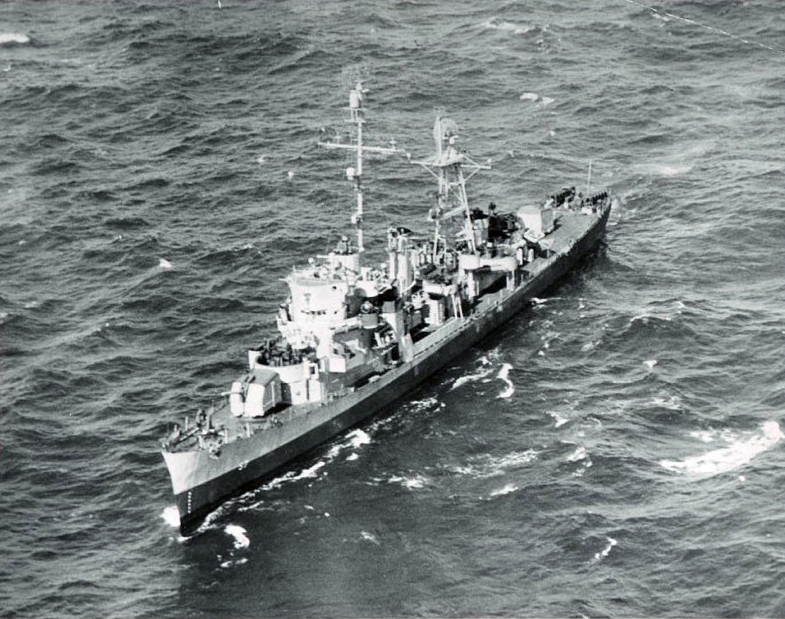
- Fogg in late 1945

History

United States
- Name: USS Fogg
- Ordered: 1942
- Builder: Bethlehem Hingham Shipyard
- Laid down: 4 December 1942
- Launched: 20 March 1943
- Commissioned: 7 July 1943
- Decommissioned: 27 October 1947
- Reclassified: DER-57, 18 March 1949; DE-57, 28 October 1954
- Stricken: 1 April 1965
- Fate: Sold for scrap, 4 January 1966

General characteristics
- Class & type: Buckley-class destroyer escort
- Displacement: 1,400 long tons (1,422 t) light; 1,740 long tons (1,768 t) standard
- Length: 306 ft (93 m)
- Beam: 37 ft (11 m)
- Draft: 9 ft 6 in (2.90 m) standard; 11 ft 3 in (3.43 m) full load
- Propulsion: 2 × boilers; General Electric turbo-electric drive; 12,000 shp (8.9 MW); 2 × solid manganese-bronze 3,600 lb (1,600 kg) 3-bladed propellers, 8 ft 6 in (2.59 m) diameter, 7 ft 7 in (2.31 m) pitch; 2 × rudders; 359 tons fuel oil
- Speed: 23 knots (43 km/h; 26 mph)
- Range: 3,700 nmi (6,900 km) at 15 kn (28 km/h; 17 mph); 6,000 nmi (11,000 km) at 12 kn (22 km/h; 14 mph)
- Complement: 15 officers, 198 men
- Armament: 3 × 3-inch/50-caliber guns; 1 × quad 1.1-inch/75-caliber gun; 8 × single 20 mm guns; 1 × triple 21 inch (533 mm) torpedo tubes; 1 × Hedgehog anti-submarine mortar; 8 × K-gun depth charge projectors; 2 × depth charge tracks

USS Fogg (DE/DER-57), a Buckley-class destroyer escort in service with the United States Navy from 1943 to 1947. She was scrapped in 1966.

== History ==
Fogg was named in honor of naval aviator Carleton Thayer Fogg (1917–1942), who was killed in action while serving aboard the aircraft carrier Enterprise during the initial attack Kwajalein, 1 February 1942.

Fogg was launched on 20 March 1943 by Bethlehem Steel Shipyard, Hingham, Massachusetts; sponsored by Mrs. Adelbert W. Fogg, mother of Lieutenant (junior grade) Fogg, and commissioned on 7 July 1943.

=== Battle of the Atlantic ===
Fogg's first cruise on convoy duty began with her departure from New York on 13 October 1943. She escorted unladen tankers to Aruba and Curaçao in the Netherlands West Indies, crossed to Algiers guarding loaded tankers, then returned by way of Curaçao and Trinidad to New York on 4 December 1943. Between 26 December 1943 and 20 August 1944, she made six escort voyages from New York to Londonderry Port, Northern Ireland, guarding the flow of men and material which made possible the invasion of Europe and the push across the continent which followed.

The escort put to sea once more from New York on 12 September 1944, to escort a convoy through the English Channel to Cherbourg, France, then called at Portsmouth, England, before returning to New York on 9 October for a brief overhaul. After special training at Charleston, she sailed on 6 November to escort a slow towing convoy to England and back. Homeward bound, on 20 December, one of the LSTs in the convoy was torpedoed, and as Fogg began to search for the submarine, she, too, was torpedoed by U-870 commanded by Ernst Hechler. Fourteen of her men were killed and two wounded, and the ship badly damaged. For two days the crew fought to save their ship, but when on 22 December the stern sheared off, all but a skeleton crew were taken off. These men restored buoyancy, and Fogg reached the Azores in tow the next day. A first attempt to tow her back to the United States failed when bad weather tore away the temporary bulkheads replacing the stern, but she at last arrived at Boston for repairs on 9 March 1945.

After refresher training, Fogg sailed out of Norfolk between 2 and 30 June 1945, acting as target ship in battle problems with a cruiser, serving as plane guard for a carrier, and training men in combat information center duty.

=== Radar picket ===
On 1 July, she entered Philadelphia Naval Shipyard for conversion to a radar picket, which was completed on 2 October. Duty along the United States East Coast and in the Caribbean, primarily in anti-submarine warfare development and as a combat information center school ship, continued until 26 July 1947, when she arrived at Charleston, South Carolina. There, Fogg was decommissioned and placed in reserve on 27 October 1947.

She was reclassified DER-57 on 18 March 1949. On 28 October 1954 she was reclassified DE-57. In October 1963, USCGC Chilula located and took under tow in sixty foot seas the mothballed Fogg during Hurricane Ginny and returned her to Virginia Beach, Virginia along with her caretaker crew of ten. Fogg was stricken from the Navy List on 1 April 1965 and sold for scrap on 6 January 1966.
