= Clara Ingram Judson Award =

Annual award given by the Society of Midland Authors

The Clara Ingram Judson Award (officially: Clara Ingram Judson Memorial Award) is given annually to the most creative children's writing in the Midwest United States since 1960 by the Society of Midland Authors. It was named after Clara Ingram Judson, the first recipient of the award.

Notable recipients include Irene Hunt for Across Five Aprils (1965), and Rebecca Caudill for A Certain Small Shepherd (1965).
