= Enneagram =

Enneagram may refer to:

- Enneagram (geometry), a nine-sided star polygon with various configurations
- Enneagram of Personality, a model of human personality illustrated by an enneagram figure

== See also ==
- Enneagon, a nine-sided polygon
- Ennead, a group of nine Egyptian deities given the Greek name Enneás
