= USS LST-359 =

LST-1-class landing ship tank

Coordinates: 42.0666670°N 19.1333330°W

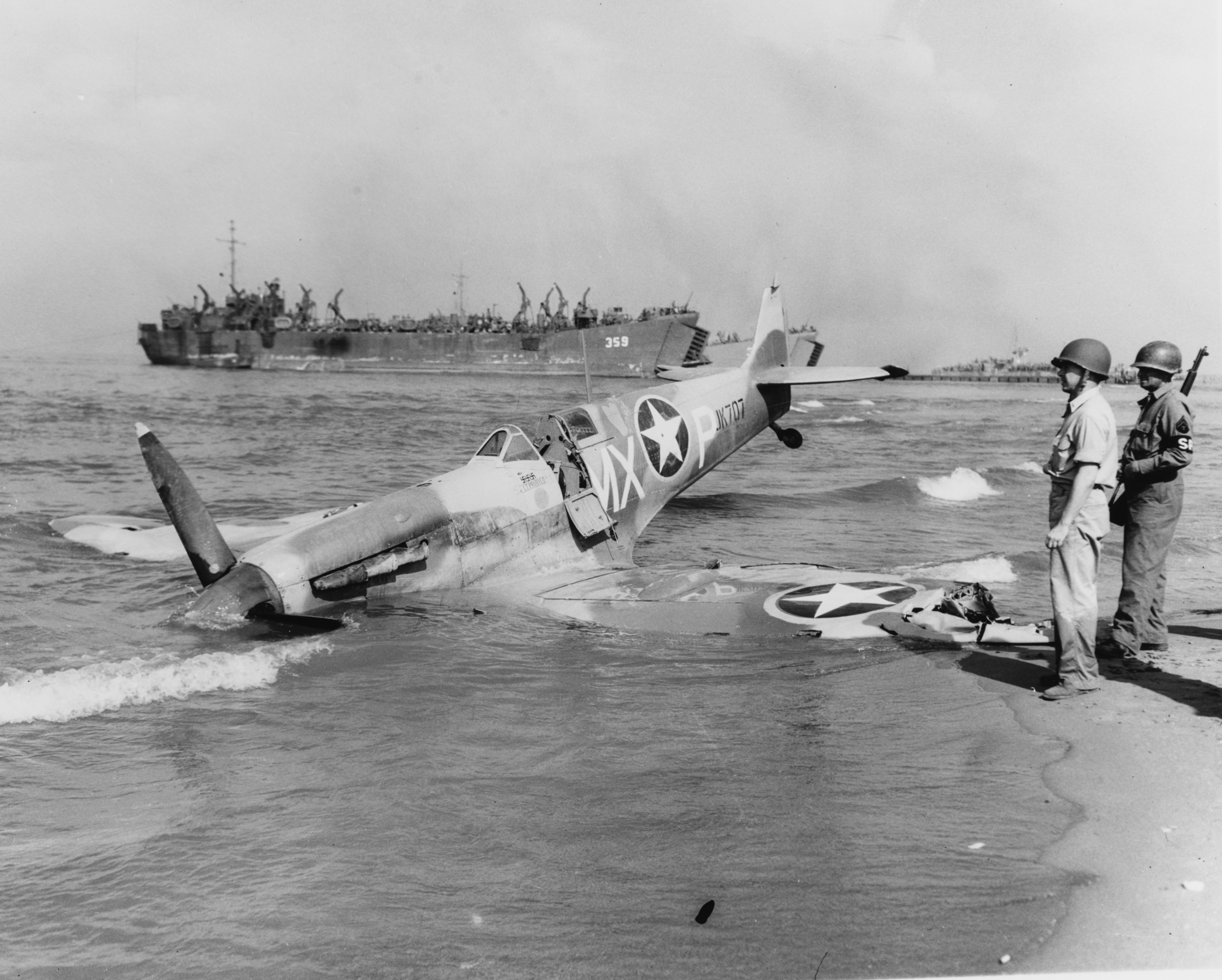
- USS LST-359 off Salerno in September 1943

History

United States
- Name: LST-359
- Builder: Charleston Navy Yard, Charleston
- Laid down: 21 November 1942
- Launched: 11 January 1943
- Sponsored by: Mrs. Albert Miller Penn
- Commissioned: 9 February 1943
- Stricken: 8 February 1945
- Identification: Callsign: NZFA
- Honors and awards: See Awards
- Fate: Sunk, 20 December 1944

General characteristics
- Class & type: LST-1-class tank landing ship
- Displacement: 4,080 long tons (4,145 t) full load; 2,160 long tons (2,190 t) landing
- Length: 328 ft (100 m) oa
- Beam: 50 ft (15 m)
- Draft: Full load: 8 ft 2 in (2.49 m) forward; 14 ft 1 in (4.29 m) aft; Landing at 2,160 t: 3 ft 11 in (1.19 m) forward; 9 ft 10 in (3.00 m) aft
- Installed power: 2 × 900 hp (670 kW) Electro-Motive Diesel 12-567A diesel engines; 1,700 shp (1,300 kW)
- Propulsion: 1 × Falk main reduction gears; 2 × Propellers
- Speed: 12 kn (22 km/h; 14 mph)
- Range: 24,000 nmi (44,000 km; 28,000 mi) at 9 kn (17 km/h; 10 mph) while displacing 3,960 long tons (4,024 t)
- Boats & landing craft carried: 2 or 6 x LCVPs
- Capacity: 2,100 tons oceangoing maximum; 350 tons main deckload
- Troops: 16 officers, 147 enlisted men
- Complement: 13 officers, 104 enlisted men
- Armament: Varied, ultimate armament; 2 × twin 40 mm (1.57 in) Bofors guns; 4 × single 40 mm Bofors guns; 12 × 20 mm (0.79 in) Oerlikon cannons

USS LST-359 was a LST-1-class tank landing ship in the United States Navy during World War II.

== Construction and career ==
LST-359 was laid down on 21 November 1942 at Charleston Navy Yard, Charleston, South Carolina. Launched on 11 January 1943 and commissioned on 9 February 1943.

During World War II, LST-388 was assigned to the Europe-Africa-Middle theater. She took part in the Sicilian occupation in Italy from 9 to 15 July 1943 and 28 July to 17 August 1943. Then the Salerno landings from 9 to 21 September of the same year.

She then participated in the Anzio-Nettuno landings, 22 January to 1 March and in the Invasion of Normandy from 6 to 25 June 1944.

She was sunk by U-870 while under tow by a Type V tugboat, named Farallon and split into two off Spain with 2 casualties on 20 December 1944.

LST-359 was struck from the Navy Register on 8 February 1945.

== Awards ==
LST-359 have earned the following awards:

- American Campaign Medal
- Combat Action Ribbon
- European-Africa-Middle East Campaign Medal (5 battle stars)
- Navy Unit Commendation
- World War II Victory Medal
