= Kathy Davis (sociologist) =

American sociologist

- Born: Kathy Davis; United States of America
- Scientific career
- Fields: Sociology, Gender Studies
- Institutions: Vrije Universiteit Amsterdam; Utrecht University

Kathy Davis is an American sociologist who serves as a senior research fellow at Vrije Universiteit Amsterdam. Her work has been influential for her sociological approaches to feminist theory and body politics.

== Career and research ==
Davis is one of the foremost contemporary theorists on a feminist approach to the practice of cosmetic surgery. Her 1995 book Reshaping the Female Body was innovative in its application of sociological research methods to the female patients who undergo cosmetic surgery. She has since been quoted as an expert on the subject by Cosmopolitan, The New Yorker, and the Financial Times.

In her award-winning 2007 book The Making of Our Bodies, Ourselves: How Feminism Travels Across Borders, Davis explored the creation and global impact of the groundbreaking feminist book, Our Bodies, Ourselves, first published in book form in 1973.

== Selected books ==
- Reshaping the Female Body (1995)
- The Making of Our Bodies, Ourselves: How Feminism Travels Across Borders (2007)

== Awards and honors ==
- 2008 Joan Kelly Memorial Prize from the American Historical Association for The Making of Our Bodies, Ourselves (2007)
- 2008 Distinguished Book Award from the Section on the Sociology of Sex and Gender of the American Sociological Association for The Making of Our Bodies, Ourselves (2007)
- 2008 Eileen Basker Memorial Prize from the Society for Medical Anthropology for The Making of Our Bodies, Ourselves (2007)
