= Justice Ingram =

Justice Ingram may refer to:

- G. Conley Ingram (1930–2019), justice of the Supreme Court of Georgia
- Kenneth F. Ingram (1929–2014), justice of the Alabama Supreme Court
