= Steven Seidman =

American sociologist (born1948)

Steven Seidman (born October 17, 1948) is a sociologist, currently professor at State University of New York at Albany. He is a social theorist working the areas of social theory, culture, sexuality, comparative sociology, theory of democracy, nationalism and globalization.

== Education ==
Seidman received his B.A. from the State University of New York at Brockport in 1972, his M.A. from the New School for Social Research in 1977 and his PhD from the University of Virginia in 1980.

== Career ==
After earning his doctorate he taught as assistant professor at New Mexico State University from 1980 to 1983 before starting his current tenure at SUNY Albany, where he became associate professor in 1986 and full professor in 1992.

To date his books have been translated into French, Chinese, Korean, Romanian, Persian, Turkish and Spanish, Polish:

== Selected works and publications ==
- Liberalism and the Origins of European Social Theory (1983)
- Jürgen Habermas on Society & Politics (1989)
- Culture and Society: Contemporary Debates (1990)
- Romantic Longings: Love in America, 1830–1980 (1991)
- Postmodernism and Social Theory (1992)
- Embattled Eros: Sexual Politics and Ethics in Contemporary America (1992)
- The Postmodern Turn (1994)
- Contested Knowledge: Social Theory in the Postmodern Era (1994; 2nd edition in 1998, 3rd edition in 2004)
- Social Postmodernism (1995)
- Queer Theory/Sociology (1996)
- Difference Troubles: Queering Social Theory and Sexual Politics (1997)
- The New Social Theory: Contemporary Debates (2001)
- Handbook of Lesbian and Gay Studies (2002)
- Beyond the Closet: The Transformation of Gay and Lesbian Life (2002)
- The Social Construction of Sexuality (2003)
- Sex and Society (to be published)
