= USRC Ingham (1849) =

Revenue Cutter

History

United States
- Builder: John Carrick, Erie, Pennsylvania
- Cost: $12,300
- Homeport: 1849: Erie, Pennsylvania; 1851: Detroit, Michigan
- Fate: sold 24 September 1856

General characteristics
- Class & type: Schooner
- Displacement: 115 tons
- Propulsion: sail
- Sail plan: topsail schooner

USRC Ingham was the second ship of the Harrison schooner class, which was built and operated by the United States Revenue Cutter Service between 1849 and 1856. She is the third ship of the Revenue Cutter Service to bear the name.

== Design and construction ==
In 1848, the Revenue Cutter Service awarded contracts for seven cutters, two for use on the Great Lakes. The resulting USRC Harrison and USRC Ingham were built with a lighter draft and smaller size to facilitate their work. Both ships were topsail schooners, with a 115-ton draft and total cost of $12,300.

A proposal by John Carrick for the cutter's construction at Erie, Pennsylvania was accepted on 16 October 1848.

== Service history ==
The Ingham would be first stationed at Erie, Pennsylvania, in August 1849 until 1851. On 17 April 1851 she left for her new port of Detroit, Michigan, arriving on the 29th. On 6 October 1856 she was auctioned to William H. Patten for $1,441 after it was authorized by the United States Congress on 6 September 1856. After auctioning, she was sold on 24 September 1856.
