= German submarine U-870 =

German World War II submarine

History

Nazi Germany
- Name: U-870
- Ordered: 25 August 1941
- Builder: DeSchiMAG AG Weser, Bremen
- Yard number: 1078
- Laid down: 29 April 1943
- Launched: 29 October 1943
- Commissioned: 3 February 1944
- Fate: Sunk on 30 March 1945

General characteristics
- Class & type: Type IXC/40 submarine
- Displacement: 1,144 t (1,126 long tons) surfaced; 1,257 t (1,237 long tons) submerged
- Length: 76.76 m (251 ft 10 in) o/a; 58.75 m (192 ft 9 in) pressure hull
- Beam: 6.86 m (22 ft 6 in) o/a; 4.44 m (14 ft 7 in) pressure hull
- Height: 9.60 m (31 ft 6 in)
- Draught: 4.67 m (15 ft 4 in)
- Installed power: 4,400 PS (3,200 kW; 4,300 bhp) (diesels); 1,000 PS (740 kW; 990 shp) (electric)
- Propulsion: 2 shafts; 2 × diesel engines; 2 × electric motors
- Speed: 18.3 knots (33.9 km/h; 21.1 mph) surfaced; 7.3 knots (13.5 km/h; 8.4 mph) submerged
- Range: 13,850 nmi (25,650 km; 15,940 mi) at 10 knots (19 km/h; 12 mph) surfaced; 63 nmi (117 km; 72 mi) at 4 knots (7.4 km/h; 4.6 mph) submerged
- Test depth: 230 m (750 ft)
- Complement: 4 officers, 44 enlisted
- Armament: 6 × torpedo tubes (4 bow, 2 stern); 22 × 53.3 cm (21 in) torpedoes; 1 × 3.7 cm (1.5 in) Flak M42 AA gun; 2 x twin 2 cm (0.79 in) C/30 AA guns

Service record
- Part of: 4th U-boat Flotilla; 3 February – 30 September 1944; 33rd U-boat Flotilla; 1 October 1944 – 30 March 1945
- Identification codes: M 49 432
- Commanders: K.Kapt. Ernst Hechler; 3 February 1944 – 30 March 1945
- Operations: 1 patrol: a. 10 November 1944 – 20 February 1945; b. 25 – 27 February 1945
- Victories: 2 warships sunk (1,960 tons); 2 merchant ships total loss (11,844 GRT); 1 warship damaged (1,400 tons)

German submarine U-870 was a Type IXC/40 U-boat of Nazi Germany's Kriegsmarine built for service during the Second World War. She was ordered on 25 August 1941, and laid down on 29 April 1943 at Bremen, Germany. She was launched on 29 October 1943 and commissioned on 3 February 1944.

== Design ==
German Type IXC/40 submarines were slightly larger than the original Type IXCs. U-870 had a displacement of 1,144 tonnes (1,126 long tons) when at the surface and 1,257 tonnes (1,237 long tons) while submerged. The U-boat had a total length of 76.76 m (251 ft 10 in), a pressure hull length of 58.75 m (192 ft 9 in), a beam of 6.86 m (22 ft 6 in), a height of 9.60 m (31 ft 6 in), and a draught of 4.67 m (15 ft 4 in). The submarine was powered by two MAN M 9 V 40/46 supercharged four-stroke, nine-cylinder diesel engines producing a total of 4,400 metric horsepower (3,240 kW; 4,340 shp) for use while surfaced, two Siemens-Schuckert 2 GU 345/34 double-acting electric motors producing a total of 1,000 shaft horsepower (1,010 PS; 750 kW) for use while submerged. She had two shafts and two 1.92 m (6 ft) propellers. The boat was capable of operating at depths of up to 230 metres (750 ft).

The submarine had a maximum surface speed of 18.3 knots (33.9 km/h; 21.1 mph) and a maximum submerged speed of 7.3 knots (13.5 km/h; 8.4 mph). When submerged, the boat could operate for 63 nautical miles (117 km; 72 mi) at 4 knots (7.4 km/h; 4.6 mph); when surfaced, she could travel 13,850 nautical miles (25,650 km; 15,940 mi) at 10 knots (19 km/h; 12 mph). U-870 was fitted with six 53.3 cm (21 in) torpedo tubes (four fitted at the bow and two at the stern), 22 torpedoes, and a 3.7 cm (1.5 in) Flak M42 as well as two twin 2 cm (0.79 in) C/30 anti-aircraft guns. The boat had a complement of forty-eight.

== Service history ==
For her one patrol, she had one commander, Korvettenkapitän Ernst Hechler, who was awarded the Knight's Cross of the Iron Cross.

Over her career she claimed two warships sunk, total of 1,960 tons, one warship damaged for a total of 1,400 tons, and two ships a total loss, total of 11,844 gross register tons (GRT). On 20 December 1944, U-870 attacked a small group of landing ships, damaging USS Fogg and sinking the 1,625-tons vessel USS LST-359. The U-boat was then attacked by a British aircraft from No. 220 Squadron RAF but got away, also evading two hunter-killer groups of vessels.

== Fate ==
She was sunk on 30 March 1945 at Bremen by US bombs.

== Summary of raiding history ==
Date	Ship Name	Nationality	Tonnage (Note: Merchant ship tonnages are in gross register tons. Military vessels are listed by tons displacement.)	Fate
20 December 1944	USS Fogg	United States Navy	1,400	Damaged at 43°02′N 19°19′W
20 December 1944	USS LST-359	United States Navy	1,625	Sunk at 42°04′N 19°08′W
3 January 1945	Henry Miller	United States	7,207	Total loss at 35°51′N 06°24′W
9 January 1945	FFL L´Enjoue	Free French Naval Forces	335	Sunk at 35°56′N 05°49′W
10 January 1945	Blackheath	United Kingdom	4,637	Total loss at 35°49′N 06°03′W

== Bibliography ==
- Busch, Rainer; Röll, Hans-Joachim (1999). German U-boat commanders of World War II : a biographical dictionary. Translated by Brooks, Geoffrey. London, Annapolis, Md: Greenhill Books, Naval Institute Press. ISBN 1-55750-186-6.
- Busch, Rainer; Röll, Hans-Joachim (1999). Der U-Boot-Krieg, 1939-1945: Deutsche U-Boot-Verluste von September 1939 bis Mai 1945 [German U-boat losses from September 1939 to May 1945] (in German). Vol. IV. Hamburg, Berlin, Bonn: Mittler. ISBN 3-8132-0514-2.
- Gröner, Eric; Jung, Dieter; Maass, Martin (1991). German Warships 1815-1945: U-boats and Mine Warfare Vessels. Vol. 2. Translated by Thomas, Keith; Magowan, Rachel. London: Conway Maritime Press. ISBN 0-85177-593-4.
- Sharpe, Peter (1998). U-Boat Fact File, 1935-1945. Great Britain: Midland Publishing. ISBN 1-85780-072-9.
