= List of shipwrecks in January 1945 =

The list of shipwrecks in January 1945 includes ships sunk, foundered, grounded, or otherwise lost during January 1945.

== 1 January ==
List of shipwrecks: 1 January 1945
Ship	State	Description
Kyokko Maru	Japan	World War II: The cargo ship struck a mine and sank in the Andaman Sea off the Mergui Archipelago, Malaya.

== 2 January ==
List of shipwrecks: 2 January 1945
Ship	State	Description
Albertos 2	Portugal	The 135-foot (41 m), 289-ton trawler was sunk in a collision with an unknown United States Navy destroyer in the Atlantic Ocean off Cape St. Vincent. The crew were rescued.
CD-138	Imperial Japanese Navy	World War II: Convoy MATA-38A: The Type D escort ship was bombed and sunk at San Fernando, Luzon, Philippines (16°37′N 120°19′E) by Douglas A-20 Havoc and Lockheed P-38 Lightning aircraft of the United States Fifth Air Force. All 82 crew members were lost.
Choei Maru No. 27 Go	Imperial Japanese Navy	The auxiliary guard boat was lost on this date.
Daian Maru	Japan	World War II: The cargo ship was torpedoed and sunk in the Java Sea east of Madoera, Netherlands East Indies (05°50′S 113°12′E) by USS Becuna (United States Navy).
Hakka Maru	Japan	World War II: The cargo ship was bombed and sunk at San Fernando, Luzon (16°37′N 120°19′E) by Douglas A-20 Havoc and Lockheed P-38 Lightning aircraft of the United States Fifth Air Force. Twenty-four crewmen were killed.
HMT Hayburn Wyke	Royal Navy	World War II: The naval trawler (324 GRT, 1917) was torpedoed and sunk in the North Sea off Ostend, West Flanders, Belgium (51°15′N 02°48′E) by the Seehund midget submarine U-5304 (Kriegsmarine).
Hishigata Maru	Japan	World War II: Convoy MATA-38A: The cargo ship was bombed and sunk at San Fernando, Luzon (16°37′N 120°19′E) by Douglas A-20 Havoc and Lockheed P-38 Lightning aircraft of the United States Fifth Air Force with the loss of a crewman and 56 passengers.
John M. Clayton	United States	World War II: The Liberty ship was bombed and damaged at Mindoro, Philippines by Japanese aircraft and was beached with a loss of four Naval Armed Guards. She was later repaired and returned to service as USS Harcourt.
Koryo Maru	Japan	World War II: The cargo ship was bombed and sunk at San Fernando, Luzon (16°37′N 120°19′E) by Douglas A-20 Havoc and Lockheed P-38 Lightning aircraft of the United States Fifth Air Force.
Meiru Maru	Imperial Japanese Navy	World War II: Convoy MATA-38A: The transport was bombed and sunk at San Fernando, Luzon (16°37′N 120°19′E) by Douglas A-20 Havoc and Lockheed P-38 Lightning aircraft of the United States Fifth Air Force with the loss of 60 crew and 400 passengers.
SF 320	Kriegsmarine	World War II: The Siebel ferry was scuttled in the port of Memel.
Shinshū Maru	Imperial Japanese Army	World War II: Convoy MATA-40: The landing craft depot ship (a.k.a. Fuso Maru) was torpedoed and damaged by USS Aspro (United States Navy) south of the Formosa Strait (21°51′N 119°44′E). She was sunk the next day by United States Navy aircraft 47 nautical miles (87 km) off Takao, Formosa. A total of 66 gunners, 33 crewmen and 283 soldiers were killed.
Shirakawa Maru	Imperial Japanese Army	World War II: The cargo ship was bombed and sunk at San Fernando, Luzon (16°37′N 120°19′E) by Douglas A-20 Havoc and Lockheed P-38 Lightning aircraft of the United States Fifth Air Force. 24 crewmen were killed.
Taishen Maru	Japan	World War II: The cargo ship was bombed and sunk at San Fernando, Luzon (16°37′N 120°19′E) by Douglas A-20 Havoc and Lockheed P-38 Lightning aircraft of the United States Fifth Air Force.
Yu 1	Imperial Japanese Army	World War II: The Type 3 submergence transport vehicle sank during an American air raid in at Port Poro, Luzon. She was salvaged on 18 January 1945 by USS Grasp (United States Navy).

== 3 January ==
List of shipwrecks: 3 January 1945
Ship	State	Description
CHa-10	Imperial Japanese Navy	World War II: The No.1-class auxiliary submarine chaser was bombed and sunk off Davao, Mindanao, Philippines (07°04′N 125°37′E) by North American B-25 Mitchell aircraft of the United States Thirteenth Air Force. Other sources indicate that she was sunk in action on 18 March 1944.
Henry Miller	United States	World War II: Convoy GUS 63: The Liberty ship was torpedoed and damaged in the Mediterranean Sea (35°51′N 6°24′W) by U-870 (Kriegsmarine). Fifty of her 72 crew were taken off by USS Brunswick (United States Navy). She sailed to Gibraltar but was declared a constructive total loss.
Kawauchi Maru no. 22	Japan	World War II: The cargo ship was bombed and sunk off the west coast of Formosa by United States Navy aircraft.
Kinrei Maru	Japan	World War II: The cargo ship was bombed and sunk off the west coast of Formosa by United States Navy aircraft.
Sanni Maru	Japan	World War II: The cargo ship was bombed and sunk off the west coast of Formosa by United States Navy aircraft.
HMS Shakespeare	Royal Navy	World War II: The S-class submarine was shelled and damaged by a Japanese merchant ship in Nankauri Strait, Andaman Islands, and later damaged by bombs from aircraft. She was declared a constructive total loss and sold for scrap 14 July 1946.
Shibazono Maru	Japan	World War II: Convoy No. 4101: The freighter was torpedoed and sunk in the Pacific Ocean (30°21′N 142°15′E) by USS Kingfish (United States Navy). Fifty-seven crewmen were killed.
Shinshū Maru	Imperial Japanese Army	World War II: Convoy MATA-40: The Shinshū Maru-class landing craft depot ship (a.k.a. Fuso Maru) was bombed by carrier aircraft from Task Force 38 in the Formosa Strait about 47 miles (76 km) off Takao, Formosa. Survivors were taken off by convoy escorts. 66 gunners, 33 crewmen and 283 soldiers were killed. She sank that evening.
Shoto Maru	Imperial Japanese Army	World War II: Convoy No. 4104: The cargo ship was torpedoed and sunk in the Pacific Ocean by USS Kingfish (United States Navy). Six crew were killed. Survivors were rescued by Takunan Maru No.2 (Imperial Japanese Navy).
Ume Maru no. 2	Japan	World War II: The cargo ship was bombed and sunk off the west coast of Formosa by United States Navy aircraft.
Yaei Maru	Japan	World War II: Convoy No. 4101: The cargo ship was torpedoed and sunk in the Pacific Ocean (30°21′N 142°15′E) by USS Kingfish (United States Navy). Two passengers, two gunners, and 27 crewmen were killed.

== 4 January ==
List of shipwrecks: 4 January 1945
Ship	State	Description
CHa-163	Imperial Japanese Navy	World War II: The CHa-1-class auxiliary submarine chaser was damaged by United States Navy aircraft in the Formosa Strait and was consequently scuttled.
CHa-176	Imperial Japanese Navy	World War II: The CHa-1-class auxiliary submarine chaser was sunk by United States Navy aircraft in the Formosa Strait.
CHa-210	Imperial Japanese Navy	World War II: The CHa-1-class auxiliary submarine chaser was sunk in the Formosa Strait by United States Navy aircraft.
HMHDML 1163	Royal Navy	World War II: The harbour defence motor launch (46/54 t, 1942) was torpedoed and sunk in Bregulie Bay by S 33 (Kriegsmarine), killing all 11 men aboard.
Horikoshi Maru No. 15	Imperial Japanese Army	World War II: The cargo ship was mined and sunk in the Pacific Ocean north east of Mukai Jima.
Iwato Maru	Imperial Japanese Navy	World War II: The Shinto Maru No. 2-class auxiliary transport ship was bombed and sunk by United States Navy Task Force 38 aircraft north east of Formosa. Seven crew were killed.
Lewis L. Dyche	United States	World War II: The Liberty ship exploded when a kamikaze detonated her cargo of bombs and fuzes south of Mindoro, Philippines (12°19′N 121°04′E). She was lost with all crew (43 merchant crew and 28 Armed Guard gunners). The explosion damaged oiler USS Pecos, minelayer USS Monadnock, seaplane tender USS Half Moon, 2 PT boats and one infantry landing craft (all United States Navy), killing three more men and wounding 14.
Lütjehorn	Germany	World War II: The cargo ship struck a mine and sank off in the Baltic Sea off Kolberg, Pomerania.
Nipiwan Park	Canada	World War II: Convoy SH 194: The Park ship (2,373 GRT, 1943) was torpedoed and damaged in the Atlantic Ocean four nautical miles (7.4 km; 4.6 mi) off Halifax, Nova Scotia (44°30′N 63°00′W) by U-1232 (Kriegsmarine). She broke in two, with the bow section sinking. A new bow section was constructed and she was returned to service in November 1946. Two crew members perished in the incident.
USS Ommaney Bay	United States Navy	World War II: The Casablanca-class escort carrier was severely damaged by a Japanese kamikaze aircraft in the Sulu Sea. Heavy fires forced the crew to abandon her and the torpedo store exploded while destroyers were rescuing them. 95 sailors were killed, including two from USS Eichenberger (United States Navy) and 65 were wounded. She was scuttled by USS Burns (United States Navy). Seven survivors were killed in the next days aboard USS Columbia (United States Navy when she was twice hit by kamikazes.
Oregon I	United Kingdom	The cargo ship (4,774 GRT, 1916) was driven ashore at Wilson's Point, Bangor, County Down, and broke in two. Both sections were refloated in October and scrapped.
Polarland	Norway	World War II: Convoy SH 194: The cargo ship (1,591 GRT, 1923) was torpedoed and sunk in the Atlantic Ocean 4 nautical miles (7.4 km) off Halifax, Nova Scotia (44°30′N 63°00′W) by U-1232 (Kriegsmarine) with the loss of seventeen of her 22 crew. Survivors were rescued by HMCS Kentville (Royal Canadian Navy).
S-4	Soviet Navy	World War II: The S-class submarine was rammed, depth charged and sunk by T3 (Kriegsmarine) in Danzig Bay. All 48 crew were lost.
Sperrbrecher 11 Belgrano	Kriegsmarine	World War II: The Sperrbrecher struck a mine and was severely damaged in the Baltic Sea off the Flensburg Fjord. She was repaired in 1946 and placed in service with the German Mine Sweeping Administration.
V 1255 Ernst Hecht	Kriegsmarine	The Vorpostenboot ran aground at the mouth of the Ems river and was wrecked. The whole crew was rescued.
W-41	Imperial Japanese Navy	World War II: Convoy MATA-36B: The W-19-class minesweeper was damaged off Kaika, Kainan Island, Formosa by United States Navy carrier-based aircraft and was beached. Refloated, repaired and returned to service by mid-February.
USS YCF-59	United States Navy	The car float sprang a leak and was beached in the Delaware River to prevent sinking.

== 5 January ==
List of shipwrecks: 5 January 1945
Ship	State	Description
CHANT 68	United Kingdom	The Channel tanker (400 GRT, 1944) capsized and sank at Grangemouth Harbour, Stirlingshire while under repair. Although she was raised on 23 January, it was deemed uneconomic to repair her, and she was scrapped.
Elsaß	Kriegsmarine	World War II: The minelayer struck a mine and sank in the Kattegat east of Samsø, Denmark. 100 crew died and 113 were rescued.
HA-71	Imperial Japanese Navy	World War II: The Type C Kō-hyōteki-class midget submarine was bombed and sunk two nautical miles (3.7 km; 2.3 mi) west south west of Chichi Jima by Consolidated PB4Y Liberator aircraft of Squadron VPB-111, United States Navy.
HA-82	Imperial Japanese Navy	World War II: The Type C Kō-hyōteki-class midget submarine was depth charged, rammed and sunk in the Surigao Strait by USS Taylor (United States Navy).
Kanko Maru	Imperial Japanese Navy	World War II: The Choko Maru-class auxiliary netlayer (909 GRT) was torpedoed and sunk in the Java Sea 44 nautical miles (81 km; 51 mi) north north west of Bawean Island, Netherlands East Indies (05°00′N 112°20′E) by USS Cavalla (United States Navy).
Momi	Imperial Japanese Navy	World War II: The Matsu-class destroyer was torpedoed and sunk 28 nautical miles (52 km; 32 mi) west south west of Manila, Philippines (14°00′N 120°20′E) by United States Navy aircraft. The ship exploded and sank with the loss of all hands.
Shunsen Maru	Imperial Japanese Navy	World War II: The auxiliary netlayer was torpedoed and sunk in the Java Sea 44 nautical miles (81 km; 51 mi) north north west of Bawean Island, Netherlands East Indies (05°00′N 112°20′E) by USS Cavalla (United States Navy).
T-107	Imperial Japanese Navy	World War II: The No. 103-class landing ship was shelled and sunk in the Pacific Ocean west of Hahajima (26°27′N 141°11′E) by USS Dunlap, USS Cummings, and USS Fanning (United States Navy):
T-154	Imperial Japanese Navy	World War II: The No. 103-class landing ship was shelled and sunk in the Pacific Ocean near Iwo Jima (24°27′N 141°20′E) by USS Dunlap, USS Cummings, USS Ellet, and USS Roe (all United States Navy).

== 6 January ==
List of shipwrecks: 6 January 1945
Ship	State	Description
USS Brooks	United States Navy	World War II: The high-speed transport, a former Clemson-class destroyer, was damaged in Lingayen Gulf by a Japanese kamikaze attack with the loss of three of her crew. She was towed to San Pedro, California, but was not repaired.
CHa-64	Imperial Japanese Navy	World War II: The auxiliary submarine chaser was sunk in the South China Sea off Poulo Condore Island, French Indochina by United States Army Air Force aircraft.
Hinoki	Imperial Japanese Navy	World War II: The Matsu-class destroyer was bombed and damaged by United States Navy aircraft on 5 January. She was shelled and sunk in the approaches to Manila Bay (14°30′N 119°30′E) the next day by USS Charles Ausburne, USS Braine, USS Russell, and USS Shaw (all United States Navy). Lost with all hands.
Isaac Shelby	United States	World War II: Convoy NV 90: The Liberty ship struck a mine in the Mediterranean Sea and was severely damaged. She was declared a total loss. There were no casualties.
Iyasaka Maru No. 8	Imperial Japanese Navy	World War II: The cargo ship was bombed and sunk off the north coast of Luzon, Philippines by United States Navy aircraft.
Kyodo Maru	Japan	World War II: The Kyodo Maru-class cargo ship was bombed and sunk off the north coast of Luzon by United States Navy aircraft. Ten crewmen were killed.
Kyoei Maru no. 3	Imperial Japanese Navy	World War II: The tanker was bombed and sunk off the north coast of Luzon by United States Navy aircraft.
Kyoei Maru No. 6	Imperial Japanese Navy	World War II: The tanker was bombed and sunk in the Babuyan Channel off the north coast of Luzon by United States Navy aircraft.
Kyoei Maru No. 10	Imperial Japanese Navy	World War II: The tanker was bombed and sunk off the north coast of Luzon, Philippines by United States Navy aircraft.
KT-834	Soviet Navy	World War II: The minesweeping boat was sunk by a mine off Daugavgrīva, Latvia. One of the crew drowned after saving his commander.
USS Long	United States Navy	World War II: The destroyer-minesweeper, a former Clemson-class destroyer, was sunk in Lingayen Gulf (16°12′N 120°11′E) by a Japanese kamikaze aircraft. All crew were rescued by USS Hovey (United States Navy).
MW 151	Germany	World War II: The motor lighter was attacked off the Hellisøy Lighthouse, Norway by de Havilland Mosquito aircraft of 144 Squadron, Royal Air Force, 404 Squadron, Royal Canadian Air Force, 455 Squadron, Royal Australian Air Force and 489 Squadron, Royal New Zealand Air Force and was consequently beached. Three German soldiers were killed and 14 Soviet POWs wounded. She subsequently broke up.
Nanko Maru No. 1	Imperial Japanese Navy	World War II: The cargo ship was bombed and sunk off the north coast of Luzon by United States Navy aircraft.
Nanshin Maru no. 10	Imperial Japanese Navy	World War II: The tanker was bombed and sunk off the north coast of Luzon by United States Navy aircraft.
Nichiei Maru	Imperial Japanese Navy	World War II: The auxiliary oiler was torpedoed and sunk in the Gulf of Thailand 60 nautical miles (110 km; 69 mi) north east of Kota Bharu, Malaya (06°45′N 102°55′E) by USS Besugo (United States Navy). There were 71 dead and 134 survivors who were rescued by Chiburi, CD-17, and CD-19 (all Imperial Japanese Navy).
Nittei Maru	Imperial Japanese Navy	The Chowa Maru-class auxiliary collier (2,728 GRT, 1941) ran aground in fog on Himeshima Reef off the north east tip of the Noto Peninsula (37°30′N 137°22′E) and broke in two. The whole crew stayed on the aft section and was rescued by Nosho Maru (Japan) and Banshu Maru No. 53 (Imperial Japanese Navy) on 8 January. The aft section sank on 10 January.
R2N Dora Fritzen	Kriegsmarine	World War II: The transport ship was torpedoed and sunk in Stavfjord off Askvoll, Norway (62°30′00″N 4°59′02″E) by HNoMS MTB 722 (Royal Norwegian Navy). There were 94 missing.
Tarakan Maru	Imperial Japanese Navy	World War II: Convoy YUSA-FU2: The Type 1TM Standard Wartime merchant tanker was torpedoed and sunk in the Pacific Ocean 75 nautical miles (139 km) north east of Hainan, China (19°45′N 111°25′E) by USS Sea Robin (United States Navy). 12 crewmembers were lost. Survivors were rescued by Hatsukari (Imperial Japanese Navy).
V 6701	Kriegsmarine	The Vorpostenboot ran aground near Gimsøy, Norway and was wrecked.
HMS Walpole	Royal Navy	World War II: The W-class destroyer struck a mine in the North Sea off Vlissingen, Zeeland, Netherlands (52°33′N 3°06′E) and was severely damaged. Two crew were killed. She was taken in to Sheerness, Kent where she was declared a constructive total loss.

== 7 January ==
List of shipwrecks: 7 January 1945
Ship	State	Description
USS Hovey	United States Navy	World War II: The destroyer-minesweeper, a former Clemson-class destroyer, was torpedoed and sunk in Lingayen Gulf (16°20′N 120°10′E) by Japanese aircraft with the loss of 24 of her 167 crew and 24 of the survivors from USS Brooks and USS Long (both United States Navy).
Mount Orthrys	Greece	The cargo ship collided with Errina (Netherlands) in the River Thames and caught fire. She was beached on the Mucking Flats and broke in two. Three crewmen were killed. She was consequently scrapped.
Nichiei Maru No. 2	Imperial Japanese Navy	World War II: The guard ship was torpedoed and sunk in the Inland Sea of Japan (31°20′N 123°40′E) by USS Spot (United States Navy).
USS Palmer	United States Navy	World War II: The destroyer-minesweeper, a former Wickes-class destroyer, was bombed and sunk in Lingayen Gulf (16°12′N 120°11′E) by Japanese aircraft with the loss of 28 of her 122 crew. Survivors were rescued by USS West Virginia (United States Navy).
Shinsei Maru	Imperial Japanese Navy	World War II: Convoy SAMA-14: The Shingo Maru-class auxiliary stores ship (4,733 GRT 1917), requisitioned by the Imperial Japanese Navy from Japan Marine Fisheries, was bombed and damaged in the Formosa Strait (22°40′N 118°45′E) by Consolidated B-24 Liberator aircraft of the United States Fourteenth Air Force. Seven crew were killed. The ship sank the next day. Most on board were transferred to W-21 (Imperial Japanese Navy) before sinking. Other ships rescued five others.
Viola	Germany	World War II: The cargo ship was torpedoed and sunk off Moster, Norway by HNoMS MTB 712 (Royal Norwegian Navy). The whole crew was saved.

== 8 January ==
List of shipwrecks: 8 January 1945
Ship	State	Description
Anyo Maru	Japan	World War II: Convoy MOTA-30: The cargo ship was torpedoed and sunk in the Pacific Ocean (24°50′N 120°35′E) by USS Barb (United States Navy) with the loss of 138 crewmen and many troops.
Ashbury	United Kingdom	The cargo ship ran aground on the Talmaine Skerries, at the entrance to the Kyle of Tongue (58°32′30″N 4°24′10″W) and sank with the loss of all hands.
Daigo Maru	Imperial Japanese Army	World War II: The Type 1K Standard ore carrier/cargo ship was torpedoed and sunk in the Pacific Ocean south west of Korea (34°37′N 122°12′E) by USS Balao (United States Navy). 12 crewmen and 14 gunners were killed. Forty-nine crew members survived the sinking and made away on lifeboats, but 16 died of exposure before reaching the Chinese coast after four days. The survivors were captured by Chinese soldiers but managed to assume control of the junk that was carrying them at the cost of two more killed. However, they were surrounded by waiting Chinese Communist troops and all but one committed suicide rather than surrender.
Fusa	Norway	World War II: The passenger ship (172 GRT, 1875) was bombed and sunk in Korsfjord, Norway by Royal Air Force aircraft with the loss of seven of the 42 people on board.
Hikoshima Maru	Japan	World War II: Convoy MOTA-30: The tanker was torpedoed and damaged in the Pacific Ocean by USS Barb (United States Navy) and ran aground in Tungshiao Bay. She was abandoned apparently without loss.
Manju Maru	Imperial Japanese Navy	World War II: Convoy MOTA-30: The tanker (a.k.a. Manzyu Maru) was torpedoed and damaged in the Pacific Ocean by USS Queenfish (United States Navy). She was run aground/beached in Tungshiao Bay (24°47′N 120°32′E) on 9 January. 13 armed guards, 30 crew and an unknown number of passengers were killed.
Sanyo Maru	Japan	World War II: Convoy MOTA-30: The tanker was torpedoed, damaged, and ran aground in the Pacific Ocean (24°50′N 120°35′E) by USS Barb (United States Navy). She broke in two and sank on 9 January. Twelve guards, two instructors, three watchmen, and 29 crewmen were killed.
Tatsuyo Maru	Imperial Japanese Navy	World War II: Convoy MOTA-30: The Standard 2AT-class cargo ship was torpedoed and sunk in the Formosa Strait by USS Barb (United States Navy). The ship exploded, killing all 63 crewmen.
Trygg	Norway	World War II: The coaster (28 GRT) was bombed and sunk in Korsfjord, Norway by Royal Air Force aircraft with the loss of two crew.

== 9 January ==
List of shipwrecks: 9 January 1945
Ship	State	Description
CD-3	Imperial Japanese Navy	World War II: The Type C escort ship was bombed and sunk north of Keelung, Formosa (27°10′N 121°45′E) by United States Navy aircraft from Task Force 38. One hundred and seventy-three men were lost.
CH-61	Imperial Japanese Navy	World War II: The No.13-class submarine chaser was sunk off southern Formosa (22°40′N 120°04′E) by United States Navy aircraft from Task Force 38.
CHa-216	Imperial Japanese Navy	The CHa-1-class auxiliary submarine chaser was lost in the Formosa area.
Claus Rickmers	Germany	World War II: The cargo ship was damaged by Allied aircraft off Lervik, Norway and was consequently beached. She was refloated and towed to Bergen. Subsequently seized as a prize of war, repaired and returned to service as Empire Carron under the British flag.
Fukuzan Maru	Japan	World War II: The cargo ship was sunk in the South China Sea (22°37′N 120°15′E by United States Navy carrier-based aircraft.
Hisagawa Maru	Imperial Japanese Navy	World War II: Convoy MOTA-30: The cargo ship was bombed and sunk by United States Navy aircraft. A total of 2,117 troops, 84 gunners, and all 86 crewmen were killed.
Hokoku Maru No. 9	Imperial Japanese Navy	World War II: The cargo ship was bombed and sunk north of Keelung by United States Navy aircraft.
Jonas Lie	United States	World War II: Convoy ON 277: The Liberty ship was torpedoed and damaged in the Bristol Channel (51°45′N 5°26′W) by U-1055 (Kriegsmarine) with the loss of two of the 69 people on board. Survivors were rescued by HMT Huddersfield Town (Royal Navy) and Fosna (Norway). On 11 January, Jonas Lie was taken in tow by Empire Sprite (United Kingdom) and HMS Stormking (Royal Navy) but the tow parted the next day. She sank on 14 January.
Juko Maru	Imperial Japanese Navy	World War II: The oiler was bombed and sunk at Takao, Formosa by United States Navy aircraft. Later raised.
Kaiho Maru	Imperial Japanese Navy	World War II: The Standard Wartime Type 2TL tanker was bombed by United States Navy aircraft from Task Force 38 and beached off Chinka, Pescadores. A total of 314 troops, six gunners, four watchmen and fourteen crewmen were killed.
Kuroshio Maru	Imperial Japanese Army	World War II: The Kuroshio Maru-class auxiliary tanker was bombed and sunk at Takao (22°00′N 120°05′E) by United States Navy aircraft. Ten crew were killed. Raised post war, repaired and put into Chinese service in 1947 as Yung Hao (Republic of China).
L'Enjoue	Free French Naval Forces	World War II: Convoy GC 107: The L'Eveille-class escort was torpedoed and sunk in the Mediterranean Sea off Cape Spartel, Morocco by U-870 (Kriegsmarine) with all its crew (59 or 63 men).
M 3145	Kriegsmarine	World War II: The KSK-2-class naval drifter/minesweeper struck a mine, probably a German one, and sank in the Irben Strait. 9 survivors were rescued by M 3157 (Kriegsmarine). There were at least two dead, the master and the flotilla commander.
Nanshin Maru No. 4	Imperial Japanese Navy	World War II: The cargo ship was bombed and sunk off northwest Luzon by United States Navy aircraft.
Nikolaifleet	Germany	World War II: The cargo ship was torpedoed and sunk off the coast of Norway by HNoMS MTB 711 and HNoMS MTB 623 (both Royal Norwegian Navy) with the loss of 29 lives.
Shinko Maru No. 1 Go	Imperial Japanese Navy	World War II: The Kiri Maru No. 8-class auxiliary transport was torpedoed and sunk in the Java Sea off Banten Bay Tandjung Pating Borneo (03°41′S 111°57′E) by HNLMS O 19 (Royal Netherlands Navy).
Sirius	Norway	World War II: The coaster (938 GRT, 1941) was bombed and sunk at Bjordal, Norway by aircraft of 144, 455 and 489 Squadrons, Royal Air Force. The crew was on shore and there were no casualties. She was raised in summer 1945, repaired and returned to service in January 1947.
U-679	Kriegsmarine	World War II: The Type VIIC submarine was sunk in the Baltic Sea by mines with the loss of all 51 crew. Wreck located confirming mines.
Ume Maru No. 21	Imperial Japanese Navy	World War II: The cargo ship was bombed and sunk off Keelung by United States Navy aircraft.

== 10 January ==
List of shipwrecks: 10 January 1945
Ship	State	Description
Arax	Soviet Navy	World War II: The Angara-class gunboat was sunk by a magnetic mine at Odesa. 64 crew and 29 other people were killed. She was later raised and broken up.
Blackheath	United Kingdom	World War II: The cargo ship (4,637 GRT, 1936) was torpedoed and damaged in the Mediterranean Sea off Cape Spartel, Morocco (35°49′N 6°03′W) by U-870 (Kriegsmarine and was beached. All 51 crew were rescued by HMS Ballinderry and HMS Kilbernie (both Royal Navy). Blackheath broke her back on 14 January and was declared a total loss.
CD-42	Imperial Japanese Navy	World War II: The Type D escort ship was torpedoed and sunk in the East China Sea west of Kume Island Okinawa.(27°01′N 126°34′E) by USS Puffer (United States Navy). She was lost with all 170 crew.
USS LCI(G)-365	United States Navy	World War II: Operation Mike I: The landing craft infantry (gunboat) was sunk by Imperial Japanese Army Shin'yō-class suicide motorboats in Lingayen Gulf. The whole crew was rescued.
USS LCI(M)-974	United States Navy	World War II: Operation Mike I: The landing craft infantry (mortar) was sunk by Imperial Japanese Army Shin'yō-class suicide motorboats in Lingayen Gulf (16°06′N 120°14′E). There were 6 missing crew and 19 survivors.
USS LST-925	United States Navy	World War II: The landing ship tank was damaged by Imperial Japanese Army Shin'yō-class suicide motorboats in Lingayen Gulf and beached on "Orange Beach" (16°06′N 120°14′E) to avoid sinking. Repaired and returned to service.
USS LST-1028	United States Navy	World War II: The landing ship tank was damaged by Imperial Japanese Army Shin'yō-class suicide motorboats in Lingayen Gulf and beached on "Orange Beach" (16°06′N 120°14′E) to avoid sinking. There were 14 wounded. Repaired and returned to service.
M 322	Kriegsmarine	World War II: The minesweeper was damaged at Haram, Norway by a strike force of 26 Bristol Beaufighter aircraft of 144 Sqn RAF, 404 Sqn, RCAF, 455 Sq, RAAF and 489 Sqn, RNZAF. Two crew were killed and 17 wounded. She was beached but was later salvaged, repaired and returned to service.
M 5610	Kriegsmarine	World War II: The KSK-2-class naval drifter/minesweeper was sunk at Haram, Norway by a strike force of 26 Bristol Beaufighter aircraft of 144 Sqn RAF, 404 Sqn, RCAF, 455 Sq, RAAF and 489 Sqn, RNZAF. There were 16 killed and one survivor.
S 33, S 58 and S 60	Kriegsmarine	World War II: The three motor torpedo boats ran aground on Unije, Yugoslavia. Several attempts to tow them failed until on 16 January by Royal Navy MGBs and MTBs attacked them. S 33 was destroyed and the other two vessels were damaged and later scuttled. All crew survived, three of them wounded.
70 Maru-Ni suicide motorboats	Imperial Japanese Army	World War II: The Maru-Ni suicide boats were sunk/destroyed during an attack on US ships in Lingayen Gulf.

== 11 January ==
List of shipwrecks: 11 January 1945
Ship	State	Description
Banshu Maru No. 56	Imperial Japanese Navy	World War II: The auxiliary minesweeper was sunk in the south entrance to Manila Bay as a blockship.
USS Belknap	United States Navy	World War II: Operation Mike I: The Clemson-class destroyer was severely damaged by a kamikaze attack in Lingayen Gulf with the loss of 38 of her crew. She was consequently withdrawn from service.
Hakuyo Maru	Imperial Japanese Navy	World War II: The auxiliary submarine chaser was sunk in the south entrance to Manila Bay as a blockship.
Normandy Coast	United Kingdom	World War II: The cargo ship (1,428 GRT, 1916) was torpedoed and sunk in the Irish Sea west of Anglesey (53°19′N 4°48′W) by U-1055 (Kriegsmarine) with the loss of nineteen of her 27 crew. Survivors were rescued by HMS PC-74 (Royal Navy).
Pasajes	Germany	The cargo ship ran aground and sank in the Skagerrak (58°05′N 8°15′E). Refloated and placed under repair. Seized by the British in May 1945, entered service as Empire Rhondda.
Roanoke	United States	World War II: The cargo ship was torpedoed and sunk in the Irish Sea west of Anglesey (53°19′N 4°48′W) by U-1055 (Kriegsmarine) with the loss of four of her 63 crew. Survivors were rescued by HMS PC-74 (Royal Navy) and Senga (Yugoslavia).
Sperrbrecher 1 Bahia Camarones	Kriegsmarine	World War II: The sperrbrecher was shelled and damaged by HMS Bellona, HMS Norfolk, HMS Onslaught, HMS Onslow and HMS Orwell (all Royal Navy). She was beached the next day near Egersund, Norway (58°22′08″N 6°02′08″E). The wreck was subsequently broken up.
T-33 Korall or T-76 Korall	Soviet Navy	World War II: The Virsaytis-class minesweeper was torpedoed and sunk in the Bay of Tallinn off Aegna, Estonia (59°45′N 24°47′E) by U-745 (Kriegsmarine). There were 28 killed and 27 wounded.
Wa-10	Imperial Japanese Navy	World War II: The No.1-class auxiliary minesweeper was sunk in the South China Sea west of Vigan Luzon Philippines (17°20′N 120°00′E) by a United States Navy destroyer.
USS YMS-14	United States Navy	The YMS-1-class minesweeper was sunk in Boston Harbor in a collision with USS Herndon (United States Navy). The whole crew was saved.

== 12 January ==
List of shipwrecks: 12 January 1945
Ship	State	Description
Akashi Maru	Imperial Japanese Navy	World War II: Operation Gratitude: The tanker was sunk in the South China Sea 50 nautical miles (93 km) south east of Cape St. Jacques, French Indochina (10°20′N 107°45′E) by United States Navy aircraft from Task Force 38 operating in the area as part of the South China Sea raid. A total of 64 troops, 21 gunners, and 21 crewmen were killed.
Ayanami Maru	Imperial Japanese Navy	World War II: Operation Gratitude: The tanker was sunk in the South China Sea off French Indochina (10°46′N 106°42′E) by United States Navy aircraft from Task Force 38. 16 crewmen and 2 gunners were killed.
Ayayuki Maru	Imperial Japanese Navy	Ayayuki Maru (top). World War II: Operation Gratitude: Convoy SATA-05: The tanker was sunk in the South China Sea 50 nautical miles (93 km; 58 mi) south east of Cape Padaran, French Indochina (11°08′N 108°49′E) by United States Navy aircraft from Task Force 38. 46 crewmen were killed.
Bahia Camarones	Germany	World War II: The cargo ship was shelled and sunk off Egersund, Norway by HMS Bellona, HMS Norfolk, HMS Onslaught, HMS Onslow and HMS Orwell (all Royal Navy). 25 crewmen, 33 Flak gunners and a Norwegian pilot were killed.
Banshu Maru No. 63	Imperial Japanese Navy	World War II: Operation Gratitude: Convoy HI-86: The cargo ship was damaged in the South China Sea off Qui Nhon, French Indochina (14°15′N 109°10′E by United States Navy aircraft from Task Force 38 and was consequently beached. Eight crewmen were killed. She was declared a total loss.
CD-17	Imperial Japanese Navy	World War II: Operation Gratitude: Convoy HI-86: The Type C escort ship was sunk in the South China Sea off Cape St. Jacques (10°20′N 107°50′E) by United States Navy aircraft from Task Force 38. All 159 crewmen were lost.
CD-19	Imperial Japanese Navy	World War II: Operation Gratitude: Convoy HI-86: The Type C escort ship was sunk in the South China Sea off Cape St. Jacques (10°20′N 107°50′E) by United States Navy aircraft from Task Force 38.
CD-23	Imperial Japanese Navy	World War II: Operation Gratitude: Convoy HI-86: The Type C escort ship was sunk in the South China Sea north of Qui Nhon (14°15′N 109°10′E) by United States Navy aircraft from Task Force 38. One hundred and fifty-five crewmen were lost.
CD-35	Imperial Japanese Navy	World War II: Operation Gratitude: Convoy SATA-05: The Type C escort ship was sunk in the South China Sea off Cape St. Jacques (11°10′N 108°55′E) by United States Navy aircraft from Task Force 38. Sixty-nine crewmen were lost.
CD-43	Imperial Japanese Navy	World War II: Operation Gratitude: Convoy SATA-05: The Type C escort ship was bombed in the South China Sea off Cape St. Jacques by United States Navy aircraft from Task Force 38 and was beached on an uninhabited island (11°10′N 108°55′E). She was scuttled by her crew. Twenty-nine crewmen were lost.
CD-51	Imperial Japanese Navy	World War II: Operation Gratitude: Convoy HI-86: The Type C escort ship was sunk in the South China Sea north of Qui Nhon (14°15′N 109°10′E) by United States Navy aircraft from Task Force 38. One hundred and fifty-nine crewmen were lost.
CH-31	Imperial Japanese Navy	World War II: Operation Gratitude: Convoy SATA-05: The No.13-class submarine chaser was sunk in the South China Sea off Cape Padaran (11°10′N 108°55′E) by United States Navy aircraft from Task Force 38.
CH-43	Imperial Japanese Navy	World War II: Operation Gratitude: The No.13-class submarine chaser was sunk in Cam Rahn Bay, French Indochina by United States Navy aircraft from Task Force 38.
Chiburi	Imperial Japanese Navy	World War II: Operation Gratitude: Convoy HI-86: The Mikura-class frigate was sunk in the South China Sea off Cape St. Jacques (10°20′N 107°50′E) by United States Navy aircraft from Task Force 38. 88 crewmen were lost.
Charlotte	Germany	World War II: The cargo ship was shelled and sunk in the North Sea off Egersund, Norway by HMS Bellona, HMS Norfolk, HMS Onslaught, HMS Onslow and HMS Orwell (all Royal Navy). She was abandoned by her crew.
Eiho Maru	Imperial Japanese Navy	World War II: Operation Gratitude: Convoy SATA-05: The tanker was sunk in the South China Sea south east of Cape St. Jacques (11°10′N 108°55′E) by United States Navy aircraft from Task Force 38.
Eiman Maru	Imperial Japanese Navy	World War II: Operation Gratitude: Convoy HI-86: The cargo ship was sunk in the South China Sea by United States Navy aircraft from Task Force 38 with a loss of nineteen crew and thirteen naval gunners.
France Maru	Imperial Japanese Army	World War II: Operation Gratitude: Convoy SASHI-30: The Daifuku Maru No. 1-class troopship was bombed and damaged by United States Navy aircraft from Task Force 38 and beached in the Mekong Delta 50 nautical miles (93 km; 58 mi) south east of Gocong, French Indochina (09°35′N 106°48′E). She was declared a total loss. Five passengers and 38 crew were lost.
Hoei Maru	Imperial Japanese Navy	World War II: Operation Gratitude: The tanker was sunk in the South China Sea south east of Cape St. Jacques (12°50′N 109°23′E) by United States Navy aircraft from Task Force 38. 22 crewmen were killed.
Horai Maru No. 9	Japan	World War II: Operation Gratitude: Convoy SASHI-05: The tanker was sunk in the South China Sea off French Indochina by United States Navy aircraft from Task Force 38. Six gunners and eleven crewmen were killed.
Ikutagawa Maru	Imperial Japanese Navy	World War II: Operation Gratitude: The auxiliary transport ship was sunk in the South China Sea 50 nautical miles (93 km; 58 mi) south east of Cape St. Jacques, French Indochina (10°20′N 107°50′E) by United States Navy aircraft from Task Force 38.
Ilona Siemers	Germany	World War II: The cargo ship was sunk at Bergen, Norway by Avro Lancaster aircraft of 9 and 617 Squadrons, Royal Air Force using Tallboy bombs.
Kashii	Imperial Japanese Navy	Kashii World War II: Operation Gratitude: Convoy HI-86: The Katori-class cruiser was bombed, torpedoed and sunk in the South China Sea north of Qui Nhon (13°50′N 109°20′E) by United States Navy aircraft from Task Force 38. Six hundred and twenty-one crewmen were lost, plus her captain and Rear Admiral Shibuya; there were nineteen survivors.
Keishu Maru	Imperial Japanese Navy	World War II: Operation Gratitude: The auxiliary transport/tug (671 GRT 1921) was bombed 15 nautical miles (28 km; 17 mi) off Cape St. Jacques, French Indochina by United States Navy carrier aircraft and was beached.
Kembu Maru	Imperial Japanese Navy	World War II: Operation Gratitude: Convoy HI-86: The passenger/cargo ship (a.k.a. Tatebe Maru) was bombed near Binh Dinh, French Indochina by United States Navy aircraft from Task Force 38 and either sank or was beached as a total loss.
Kenei Maru	Imperial Japanese Navy	World War II: Operation Gratitude: Convoy SATA-05: The cargo ship was sunk at Saigon by United States Navy aircraft from Task Force 38.
Kensei Maru	Imperial Japanese Navy	World War II: Operation Gratitude: The cargo ship was bombed and sunk in the South China Sea south east of Cape St. Jacques (11°10′N 108°35′E) by United States Navy aircraft from Task Force 38.
Kiyo Maru	Imperial Japanese Army	World War II: Operation Gratitude: The cargo ship was sunk in the South China Sea off French Indochina by United States Navy aircraft from Task Force 38.
Kong Oscar II	Germany	The cargo ship (914 GRT, 1904) ran aground in a storm at Sandnessjøen, Norway. She sank the next day. The wreck was scrapped during the winter of 1954–55.
Koshin Maru	Imperial Japanese Navy	World War II: Operation Gratitude: Convoy SATA-05: The tanker was sunk in the South China Sea south east Cape St. Jacques by United States Navy aircraft from Task Force 38. Forty-four crewmen, 15 gunners and 24 passengers were killed.
Kumagawa Maru	Imperial Japanese Navy	World War II: Operation Gratitude: The oiler (a.k.a. Shumagawa Maru and Tamagawa Maru) was sunk in the South China Sea off Cape St. Jacques (10°20′N 107°50′E) by United States Navy aircraft from Task Force 38. Ninety-eight passengers and seven crewmen were killed.
Kyoei Maru No. 7	Imperial Japanese Army	World War II: Operation Gratitude: Convoy SASHI-30: The transport was bombed and sunk in the Mekong Delta 50 nautical miles (93 km; 58 mi) south east of Gocong (09°35′N 106°48′E) by United States Navy aircraft from Task Force 38 with the loss of all 25 hands.
Kyokuun Maru	Imperial Japanese Army	World War II: Operation Gratitude: Convoy HI-86: The cargo ship was bombed in the South China Sea by United States Navy aircraft from Task Force 38 and was beached north of Qui Nhon. She was declared a total loss.
USS LCI(L)-600	United States Navy	World War II: The landing craft infantry (large) was sunk at Ulithi, Caroline Islands by a Kaiten submarine/human torpedo (Imperial Japanese Navy). Three crewmen were killed.
La Motte-Picquet	(France) Vichy French Navy	World War II: Operation Gratitude: The training hulk, a former Duguay-Trouin-class cruiser, was bombed and sunk in the South China Sea off Cat Lai, French Indochina by United States Navy aircraft from Task Force 38. One crewman was killed and around 70 were wounded.
Louhi	Finnish Navy	World War II: Lapland War: The Louhi-class minelayer was torpedoed and sunk in the Gulf of Finland off Hanko (59°40′N 23°05′E) by U-370 (Kriegsmarine), or sunk by mines, with the loss of ten of her 41 crew.
M-1	Kriegsmarine	World War II: The M 1935-class minesweeper was sunk at Bergen in an air raid by Avro Lancaster aircraft of 9 and 617 Squadrons, Royal Air Force using Tallboy bombs. Twenty of the ship's crew were killed in the sinking.
M-273	Kriegsmarine	World War II: The Type 1940 minesweeper was shelled and sunk off Egersund by HMS Bellona, HMS Norfolk, HMS Onslaught, HMS Onslow and HMS Orwell (all Royal Navy).
Nanryo Maru No. 2	Japan	World War II: Operation Gratitude: Convoy SASHI-05: The tanker was sunk in the South China Sea off French Indochina by United States Navy aircraft from Task Force 38. Two gunners and six crewmen were killed.
Octant	(France) Vichy French Navy	World War II: Operation Gratitude: The survey ship was bombed and sunk in the South China Sea off Cat Lai by United States Navy aircraft from Task Force 38.
Otowa Maru	Imperial Japanese Navy	World War II: Operation Gratitude: The auxiliary minesweeper was sunk in Cam Rahn Bay (11°50′N 109°00′E) by United States Navy aircraft from Task Force 38. One crew was killed.
Otsusan Maru	Japan	World War II: Operation Gratitude: Convoy HI-86: The Standard Type 2AT tanker (a.k.a. Otsuyama Maru and Otusan Maru) was bombed in the South China Sea by United States Navy aircraft from Task Force 38 and was beached north of Qui Nhon. She was declared a total loss. Twenty-eight crewmen and seven gunners were killed.
Otto Petersen	Denmark	World War II: The cargo ship struck a mine in the Skaggerak off Skelvik, Norway and was beached to avoid sinking. One crew was killed by the explosion. She was declared total loss but was later repaired and returned to service.
PB-103	Imperial Japanese Navy	World War II: Operation Gratitude: Convoy SATA-05: The patrol boat, a former Lapwing-class minesweeper, was strafed in the South China Sea off Cape Padaran (11°10′N 108°55′E) by United States Navy aircraft from Task Force 38, setting off her depth charges sinking her in shallow water with her bridge above water. 23 crew were killed and 52 wounded.
HMS Regulus	Royal Navy	World War II: The Algerine-class minesweeper (1,030/1,325 t, 1944) was mined and sunk in the Aegean Sea off Corfu, Greece. One crew was killed and several were wounded.
San Luis Maru	Imperial Japanese Navy	World War II: Operation Gratitude: Convoy HI-86: The tanker was bombed and sunk in the South China Sea 25 nautical miles (46 km; 29 mi) north east of Binh Dinh, French Indochina (14°20′N 109°09′E) by United States Navy aircraft from Task Force 38. Nine gunners and three crewmen were killed.
Shingi Maru	Japan	World War II: Operation Gratitude: Convoy SASHI-30: The cargo ship was sunk in the South China Sea off Cape St. Jacques (09°24′N 106°44′E) by United States Navy aircraft from Task Force 38. 790 troops and 38 crewmen were killed.
Shinsei Maru	Imperial Japanese Navy	World War II: Operation Gratitude: Convoy SASHI-30: The cargo ship was sunk in the South China Sea off Cape St. Jacques (09°24′N 106°44′E) by United States Navy aircraft from Task Force 38. 64 Army passengers, 8 escort troops and 22 crewmen were killed.
Shinsei Maru No. 17	Imperial Japanese Navy	World War II: Operation Gratitude: The cargo ship was sunk at Saigon, French Indochina by United States Navy aircraft from Task Force 38. 30 crewmen were killed.
Shoei Maru	Imperial Japanese Navy	World War II: Operation Gratitude: Convoy HI-86: The tanker was bombed and sunk in the South China Sea north of Qui Nhon (14°14′N 109°10′E) by United States Navy aircraft from Task Force 38. Seven crewmen and three gunners were killed.
USS Swordfish	United States Navy	World War II: The Sargo-class submarine was either depth charged or struck a mine and sank off Okinawa Island, Japan with the loss of all 89 crew.
T-140	Imperial Japanese Navy	World War II: Operation Gratitude: The No.103-class landing ship was sunk at Saigon by United States Navy aircraft from Task Force 38.
Taikyu Maru	Imperial Japanese Navy	World War II: Operation Gratitude: The cargo ship was sunk in the South China Sea off Cape St. Jacques by United States Navy aircraft from Task Force 38. 17 crew and 198 passengers were killed.
Tai Poo Sek	Vichy France	World War II: Operation Gratitude: The cargo ship was bombed and sunk in the Mekong River, French Indochina, by United States Navy aircraft from Task Force 38.
Tatsubato Maru	Imperial Japanese Navy	World War II: Operation Gratitude: Convoy HI-86: The Type 1K Standard Merchant ore carrier was bombed and damaged in the South China Sea north of Qui Nhon by United States Navy aircraft from Task Force 38 and beached, a total loss. Ten crewmen were killed.
Toyu Maru	Imperial Japanese Navy	World War II: Operation Gratitude: Convoy SATA-05: The troopship was sunk in the South China Sea off Cape St. Jacques (10°20′N 107°45′E) by United States Navy aircraft from Task Force 38. A soldier, 28 other passengers, and 23 crewmen were killed.
Treern	South African Navy	World War II: The auxiliary minesweeper (247 GRT, 1929) struck a mine and sank in the Aegean Sea off eastern Greece (39°06′N 23°14′E) with the loss of 23 of her 24 crew. The survivor was rescued by HMS Musketeer (Royal Navy).
W-101	Imperial Japanese Navy	World War II: Operation Gratitude: Convoy SATA-05: The Bangor-class minesweeper was sunk in the South China Sea off Cape Padaran (11°10′N 108°55′E) by United States Navy aircraft from Task Force 38.
Yoshu Maru	Imperial Japanese Navy	World War II: Operation Gratitude: Convoy HI-86: The cargo ship (a.k.a. Yujo Maru and Yushu Maru) was sunk in the South China Sea north of Qui Nhon by United States Navy aircraft from Task Force 38. Five gunners and 45 crewmen were killed.
Yusei Maru	Imperial Japanese Navy	World War II: Operation Gratitude: Convoy HI-86: The cargo ship was damaged in the South China Sea off Qui Nhon (14°15′N 109°10′E) by United States Navy aircraft. She was beached but was declared a total loss.

== 13 January ==
List of shipwrecks: 13 January 1945
Ship	State	Description
Beltana	Sweden	World War II: The fishing boat was sunk by a mine southwest of Pater Noster Lighthouse with the loss of 5 lives. The only survivor was saved by another Swedish fishing boat.
I-362	Imperial Japanese Navy	World War II: The Type D submarine was sunk between Ulithi and Eniwetok (12°08′N 154°27′E) by USS Fleming (United States Navy) with all hands.
USS P-584	United States Navy	The ex-United States Army Air Force crash rescue boat, with a United States Navy crew, but under operational control of the Office of Strategic Services was destroyed by an explosion at Livorno, Italy with eleven crewmen wounded.
SS-1	Imperial Japanese Navy	World War II: The SS-class landing ship was sunk off Luzon by United States aircraft.
Vs 130	Kriegsmarine	World War II: The KSK-2-class naval drifter/minesweeper was heavily damaged by a mine in the Flensburg Fjord and sank while being towed to the port.
Vaga	Norway	World War II: The cargo ship (1,615 GRT, 1924) was bombed and sunk in the North Sea off Homborsund, Norway by Handley Page Halifax aircraft of 58 Squadron, Royal Air Force with the loss of seven lives.
USS YC-912	United States Navy	The open lighter foundered in heavy weather in the North Pacific.

== 14 January ==
List of shipwrecks: 14 January 1945
Ship	State	Description
Athelviking	United Kingdom	World War II: Convoy BX 141: The tanker (8,779 GRT, 1926) was torpedoed and sunk in the Atlantic Ocean east of Halifax, Nova Scotia, Canada (44°28′N 63°28′W) by U-1232 (Kriegsmarine) with the loss of four of her 41 crew. Survivors were rescued by HMCML-102 (Royal Canadian Navy).
British Freedom	United Kingdom	World War II: Convoy BX 141: The tanker (6,985 GRT, 1928) was torpedoed and sunk in the Atlantic Ocean east of Halifax, Nova Scotia (44°28′N 63°28′W) by U-1232 (Kriegsmarine) with the loss of one of her 57 crew. Survivors were rescued by HMCS Gaspé (Royal Canadian Navy).
Ely	United Kingdom	The trawler (183 GRT, 1903) sank 50 miles (80 km) northeast of the Bishops Rock Lighthouse, after a collision with HMCS Trillium (Royal Canadian Navy) with the loss of six crewmen. There were three survivors.
Martin van Buren	United States	World War II: The Liberty ship was torpedoed and damaged in the Atlantic Ocean (44°28′N 63°28′W) by U-1232 (Kriegsmarine) with the loss of three gunners. Survivors abandoned ship and were rescued by HMCS Comox and HMCS Fundy (both Royal Canadian Navy). Martin van Buren was taken in tow by a tug, but the tow line was cut by a naval vessel which ignored signals being flown by the tug. She drifted ashore at Sambro, Nova Scotia and broke in two. She was declared a constructive total loss. The wreck was scrapped in situ in 1950.
Mimi Horn	Germany	World War II: The cargo ship was bombed and sunk in the Baltic Sea off Brüsterort, Pomerania by Soviet Douglas A-20 Havoc aircraft of 51 MTAP. Four crewmen were killed.
USS PT-73	United States Navy	World War II: The Higgins 78'-class PT boat was grounded in Balakias Bay Mindoro (13°50′N 120°10′E) and destroyed by her crew due to Japanese troops nearby. The whole crew was saved.
S 180	Kriegsmarine	World War II: The Type 1939/40 schnellboot was sunk by a mine in the North Sea off Texel, North Holland, Netherlands. There were 11 dead and 12 survivors.
Yurishima	Imperial Japanese Navy	World War II: The Hirashima-class minelayer (a.k.a. Yurijima) was torpedoed and sunk in the South China Sea off Kota Bharu, Malaya (05°45′N 113°13′E) by USS Cobia (United States Navy).

== 15 January ==
List of shipwrecks: 15 January 1945
Ship	State	Description
Dalemoor	United Kingdom	World War II: The cargo ship (5,835 GRT, 1922) struck a naval mine and sank in the North Sea off Cromer, Norfolk (53°23′00″N 0°47′24″E). Her 56 crew survived.>
Doggerbank	Germany	World War II: The fishing vessel was sunk by striking a mine, or by Soviet Douglas A-20 Havoc aircraft, in the Baltic Sea off Danzig.
Enoshima Maru	Imperial Japanese Army	World War II: The cargo ship was sunk in the South China Sea off Takao, Formosa (22°37′N 122°15′E) by United States Navy aircraft from Task Force 38.
Ferdinand	Germany	World War II: The fishing vessel was sunk by striking a mine, or by Soviet Douglas A-20 Havoc aircraft, in the Baltic Sea off Danzig.
Harima Maru	Japan	World War II: The tanker was sunk in the South China Sea off Yulin, Hainan, China by United States Navy aircraft.
Hatakaze	Imperial Japanese Navy	World War II: The Kamikaze-class destroyer was sunk in the South China Sea off Hisashiyama (22°37′N 122°15′E) by United States Navy aircraft.
Horei Maru	Japan	World War II: The cargo ship was sunk in the South China Sea south of Formosa by American aircraft.
Kujyo Maru No. 5	Japan	World War II: The cargo ship was sunk off Paramushiro Island, Kuril Islands by aircraft.
Kyo Maru No. 1	Imperial Japanese Navy	World War II: The auxiliary minesweeper was sunk in the Malacca Strait northwest of Penang, Malaya (05°18′N 100°20′E) by a mine.
Magdala	Netherlands	The cargo ship departed from Reykjavík, Iceland for a British port. No further trace, presumed foundered with the loss of all hands.
Maja	United Kingdom	World War II: The tanker (8,181 GRT, 1931) was torpedoed and sunk in the Irish Sea south east of Drogheda, County Louth, Ireland (53°40′N 5°14′W) by U-1055 (Kriegsmarine) with the loss of 25 of her 65 crew. Survivors were rescued by the trawler Hendrik Conscience (Belgium).
Miri Maru	Imperial Japanese Navy	World War II: The 1TL-class fleet tanker was sunk off Takao (22°37′N 122°15′E) by United States Navy aircraft from Task Force 38. 10 crew members and 17 naval gunners were killed.
T-14	Imperial Japanese Navy	T-14 World War II: The No.1-class landing ship was sunk in the South China Sea off Hisashiyama (22°37′N 122°15′E) by United States Navy aircraft from Task Force 38.
Tatsuno Maru	Japan	World War II: Convoy No. 882: The cargo ship was torpedoed by USS Thresher (United States Navy), exploded and broke in two. The ship's fore part sank immediately in the Luzon Strait, about 75 miles (121 km) north of Luzon, Philippines. The stern section sank the next day at 20°05′N 120°13′E. 8 passengers and 12 crew were killed.
HMS Thane	Royal Navy	World War II: The Bogue-class escort carrier (11,420/15,390 t, 1943) was torpedoed and damaged in the Firth of Clyde by U-1172 (Kriegsmarine) with the loss of ten crew. She was towed to Greenock, Renfrewshire by HMS Loring but was declared a constructive total loss. Scrapped in 1946.
Tsuga	Imperial Japanese Navy	World War II, South China Sea raid: The Momi-class destroyer was sunk in the South China Sea off Mako, Formosa (23°33′N 119°33′E) by United States Navy aircraft from Task Force 38.
V 5304	Germany	World War II: The vorpostenboot was sunk at Lervik, Norway by de Havilland Mosquito aircraft of Royal Air Force Banff Strike Wing. One crew was killed and 12 wounded.
USS YP-73	United States Navy	The yard patrol craft ran aground and sank 1,000 yards (910 m) east of the Spruce Cape signal station, Kodiak, Alaska. Although six crew members were rescued by USCGC Bittersweet (United States Navy), ten crewmen died from exposure due to the extreme cold.

== 16 January ==
List of shipwrecks: 16 January 1945
Ship	State	Description
Anri No. 2 GO	Imperial Japanese Navy	World War II: The cargo ship was sunk at Hong Kong by United States Navy carrier-based aircraft.
Dejatelnyj	Soviet Navy	World War II: Convoy KB 1: The Clemson-class destroyer was sunk in the Kara Sea 40 nautical miles (74 km) east of Cape Terebirski (69°04′N 36°10′E), either by being torpedoed by U-956 (Kriegsmarine), or by accidental explosion of her depth charges while attacking the submarine, with the loss of 117 of her 124 crew. The seven survivors reported a massive explosion at the ship's stern. Survivors were rescued by Derzky (Soviet Navy).
Donau	Germany	World War II: The troopship was sunk in Oslofjord, Norway, by ten limpet mines that had been placed by Norwegian saboteurs. There was no casualty. The wreck was raised in 1952 and towed to Bremerhaven, West Germany for scrapping.
Hakurei Maru	Imperial Japanese Navy	World War II: The Hokkai Maru-class naval trawler/auxiliary storeship was sunk by a mine 4.9 nautical miles (9.1 km; 5.6 mi) off Cape Lojar, Laut Island, Netherlands East Indies (04°10′S 116°05′E).
James Harrod	United States	The Liberty ship collided with Raymond B. Stevens (United States) in the North Sea off Deal, Kent. She was beached in Pegwell Bay but broke in two and was declared a constructive total loss.
USS LSM-318	United States Navy	World War II: Operation Mike I: The landing ship medium was sunk in Lingayen Gulf by a kamikaze attack.
HMS LST-415	Royal Navy	World War II: The landing ship tank, Mk.2 (1,625/4,080 t, 1943) was torpedoed and damaged off the Tongue Lightship (United Kingdom) by a Kriegsmarine Schnellboot and was beached. She was subsequently scrapped.
Marina	United States	World War II: Convoy CU 53: The cargo ship struck a mine off Le Havre, Seine-Inférieure, France and was beached. All 101 people on board survived. She was later refloated and towed to the United States, but was declared a constructive total loss and scrapped.
Matsushima Maru	Japan	World War II: The Type 2TL Wartime Standard tanker was bombed and damaged at Hong Kong by United States Navy carrier-based aircraft. A guard, eight troops and three crewmen were killed. She was beached the next day on Koshima Island, Hong Kong and abandoned. Scrapped in 1947.
Sanka Maru	Imperial Japanese Navy	World War II: The oiler was sunk at Hong Kong by United States Navy carrier-based aircraft. Twenty-one crewmen were killed.
SF 303	Kriegsmarine	World War II: The Siebel ferry was bombed and strafed by fighter-bomber aircraft in Jablanac bay, Croatia, and burned. There were no casualties.
Tenei Maru	Imperial Japanese Navy	World War II: The oiler was sunk at Hong Kong by United States Navy carrier-based aircraft. A passenger, two troops and three crewmen were killed.
U-248	Kriegsmarine	World War II: The Type VII submarine was depth charged and sunk in the Atlantic Ocean by USS Hayter, USS Hubbard, USS Otter and USS Varian (all United States Navy) with the loss of all 47 crew.
V 6408 Skagerak	Kriegsmarine	World War II: The Tirol-class naval whaler/Vorpostenboot was torpedoed and sunk off Folda, Norway by HNoMS Utsira (Royal Norwegian Navy) with all 50 crew.

== 17 January ==
List of shipwrecks: 17 January 1945
Ship	State	Description
Aar	Germany	World War II: The coaster was sunk in an American air raid on Hamburg.
Ammon	Germany	World War II: The cargo ship was sunk in an American air raid on Hamburg.
Christian Russ	Germany	World War II: The coaster was sunk in an American air raid on Hamburg.
Emma Sauber	Germany	World War II: The cargo ship was sunk in an American air raid on Hamburg. She was refloated in 1949, repaired and entered West German service.
F 1	Kriegsmarine	The Siebel ferry was lost on this date.
Griep	Kriegsmarine	World War II: The salvage ship was sunk in an American air raid on Hamburg.
Henriette Schulte	Germany	World War II: The cargo ship was sunk in a Soviet air raid on Memel, East Prussia.
Hiev	Kriegsmarine	World War II: The salvage ship was sunk in an American air raid on Hamburg.
Johanna	Germany	World War II: The coaster was sunk in an American air raid on Hamburg.
M 305	Kriegsmarine	The minesweeper foundered in the Baltic Sea off Brüsterort, Pomerania due to storm and icing with the loss of 40 lives.
Mangan	Germany	World War II: The cargo ship was sunk in an American air raid on Hamburg.
Martha Peters	Germany	World War II: The cargo ship was sunk in an American air raid on Hamburg.
Odysseus	Greece	The cargo ship (4,577 GRT, 1913) ran aground at Morris Point, near Halifax, Nova Scotia, Canada (44°28′N 63°33′W) and sank. There were no casualties.
Steinburg	Germany	World War II: The cargo ship struck a mine and was beached near Libau, Latvia.
T-15	Imperial Japanese Navy	World War II: The No.1-class landing ship was torpedoed and sunk in the East China Sea in the Makurazaki Bight off Kyushu (31°08′N 130°28′E) by USS Tautog (United States Navy). 225 men were killed.
U-2515	Kriegsmarine	World War II: The Type XXI submarine was sunk in an American air raid on Hamburg.
U-2523	Kriegsmarine	World War II: The Type XXI submarine was sunk in an American air raid on Hamburg.
U-2530	Kriegsmarine	World War II: The Type XXI submarine was sunk in an American air raid on Hamburg. d.
U-2532	Kriegsmarine	World War II: The Type XXI submarine was sunk in an American air raid on Hamburg.
U-2537	Kriegsmarine	World War II: The Type XXI submarine was sunk in an American air raid on Hamburg.
V 1417 Stoomloodsvartuig 17	Kriegsmarine	World War II: The Vorpostenboot was sunk in the North Sea off Terschelling, Friesland, Netherlands by British aircraft.
Weissee	Germany	World War II: The cargo ship was sunk at Hamburg in an Allied air raid. She was refloated in 1949 and scrapped.

== 18 January ==
List of shipwrecks: 18 January 1945
Ship	State	Description
Edith Wharton	United States	World War II: The Liberty ship struck a mine and sank in the Scheldt. The wreck was dispersed in December 1963.
Empire Clansman	United Kingdom	World War II: The collier (2,065 GRT, 1942) ran aground on South Carr Rocks, off North Berwick, Berwickshire. She was later refloated, repaired and returned to service.
HMS LCP(L) 11	Royal Navy	The landing craft personnel (large) (5,9/8,2 t, 1940) was lost on this date.
HMS MTB-690	Royal Navy	The Fairmile D motor torpedo boat (90/107 t, 1943) struck a submerged wreck and sank in the North Sea off Lowestoft, Suffolk.
Samanco	United Kingdom	The cargo ship was driven ashore in the Belfast Lough and broke her back. She was refloated on 19 February and beached in Ballyholme Bay. Subsequently refloated, repaired and returned to service.
Samvern	United Kingdom	World War II: The Liberty ship (7,219 GRT, 1943) struck a mine and sank in the Scheldt, Belgium (51°22′N 3°02′E).

== 19 January ==
List of shipwrecks: 19 January 1945
Ship	State	Description
Agata Maru	Imperial Japanese Navy	World War II: The Agata Maru-class auxiliary transport (302 GRT, 1931) was shelled and damaged by HMS Supreme (Royal Navy) off Port Blair, Andaman Islands. She was beached at Port Blair. Refloated and returned to service.
Carrier	Norway	World War II: The cargo ship (3,105 GRT, 1921) struck a mine and sank in the North Sea off Cromer, Norfolk, United Kingdom (53°22′58″N 0°58′54″E). Her 33 crew were all saved.
HMT Northern Isles	Royal Navy	The anti-submarine naval trawler (655 GRT, 1936) was wrecked off Durban, South Africa.
HMS Porpoise	Royal Navy	World War II: The Grampus-class submarine (1,768/2,053 t, 1933) was sunk in the Malacca Strait off Penang, Malaya by Japanese aircraft.
United States Maru	Japan	World War II: The coaster was torpedoed and sunk in the East China Sea off Shanghai, China by USS Spot (United States Navy).

== 20 January ==
List of shipwrecks: 20 January 1945
Ship	State	Description
Hidaka Maru	Imperial Japanese Navy	World War II: Convoy FU-905: The Type 1K ore carrier was torpedoed and sunk in the Pacific Ocean 260 nautical miles (480 km) south east of Cape Muroto (13°32′N 135°58′E) by USS Batfish (United States Navy). Fourteen passengers and two crewmen were killed.
Syuri Maru	Imperial Japanese Navy	World War II: The motor torpedo boat tender (a.k.a. Shuri Maru) was torpedoed and sunk in the East China Sea at the south end of the Tsushima Strait (33°45′N 128°43′E) near Sasebo by USS Tautog (United States Navy). Her captain and 118 crewmen were killed; one crewman was rescued by USS Tautog and made a prisoner of war.
Tokiwa Maru	Japan	World War II: The fishing trawler was torpedoed and sunk in the East China Sea by USS Spot (United States Navy).

== 21 January ==
List of shipwrecks: 21 January 1945
Ship	State	Description
HMS Computator	Royal Navy	The Castle-class minesweeping naval trawler (286 GRT, 1919) was sunk in a collision with HMS Vanoc (Royal Navy) in Seine Bay, Normandy (49°42′N 00°37′W).
Galatea	Norway	World War II: The cargo ship (1,152 GRT, 1912) was torpedoed and sunk in St. George's Channel off Bardsey Island (52°40′N 5°23′W) by U-1051 (Kriegsmarine) with the loss of twenty of her 21 crew. The survivor was rescued by HMS Tyler (Royal Navy).
George Hawley	United States	World War II: Convoy TBC 43: The Liberty ship was torpedoed and damaged in the English Channel 3 nautical miles (5.6 km) off the Wolf Trap Lighthouse (50°0′N 5°45′W) by U-1199 (Kriegsmarine) with the loss of two of her 68 crew. Survivors abandoned ship and were rescued by TID-74 (United Kingdom) and S. Wiley Wakeman (United States). George Hawley was taken in tow by HMS Allegiance (Royal Navy) and beached at Falmouth, Cornwall, where she was declared a constructive total loss. Refloated in June 1946, subsequently scuttled.
Haruta Maru	Imperial Japanese Navy	World War II: The Haruta Maru-class salvage ship was bombed and sunk at Hong Kong (22°20′N 114°10′E) by a Consolidated B-24 Liberator aircraft of the United States Fourteenth Air Force. The wreck was broken up in 1951.
USS LCT-253	United States Navy	The landing craft tank foundered in the Pacific Ocean off the Gilbert Islands.
M-305	Kriegsmarine	The Type 1940 minesweeper foundered in the Baltic Sea off Brüsterort, Pomerania.
HMML 891	Royal Navy	World War II: Burma Campaign: The motor launch (76/86 t, 1944) was sunk by a mine in the harbour at Kyaukpyu, Burma, Ramree Island, Burma. 14 uninjured survivors out of 17 crew rescued by boats from HMS Rapid (Royal Navy).
Munakata Maru	Japan	World War II: The Standard 2AT tanker was bombed and damaged at Keelung, Formosa (22°37′N 120°15′E) by aircraft from USS Yorktown and USS Cabot (both United States Navy). A gunner and three crewmen were killed. She was bombed again the next day, set on fire and exploded.
Shincho Maru	Japan	World War II: The Standard 1TM tanker was bombed and sunk in Takao Harbour, Formosa (22°37′N 120°15′E) by United States Navy carrier-based aircraft. Raised and resunk at the entrance to Takao Harbour on 15 April.
Teifu Maru	Japan	World War II: The transport (a.k.a. Taihu Maru) was bombed and sunk at Takao (22°37′N 121°15′E) by United States Navy carrier-based aircraft. Eight crewmen were killed.
U-1199	Kriegsmarine	World War II: The Type VIIC submarine was depth charged and sunk in the Atlantic Ocean off the Isles of Scilly (49°57′N 5°42′W) by HMS Icarus and HMS Mignonette (both Royal Navy) with the loss of 48 of her 49 crew.
Unknown landing craft	Unknown	World War II: Burma Campaign: The landing craft assault blew up and sank in the harbour at Kyaukpyu, Burma, Ramree Island, Burma, probably from a mine. Of the 37 troops and crew only 7 survivors were rescued.
Yamazawa Maru	Japan	World War II: The Standard 2AT tanker was bombed and sunk in Takao Harbour (22°37′N 120°15′E) by United States Navy carrier-based aircraft. Raised, repaired in 1946 and put into Chinese service as Ven Ping.
Yurin Maru	Japan	World War II: A requisitioned cargo ship that was bombed and sunk in Takao Harbour (22°37′N 120°15′E) by United States Navy carrier-based aircraft. Formerly Chinese cargo ship “Hwah Jah”.

== 22 January ==
List of shipwrecks: 22 January 1945
Ship	State	Description
Saga	Imperial Japanese Navy	World War II: The Saga-class river gunboat was bombed and sunk at Hong Kong by Consolidated B-24 Liberator aircraft of the United States Fourteenth Air Force.
Stockholm	Germany	World War II: The coaster was torpedoed and sunk in the North Sea off Stavanger, Norway by HMS Venturer (Royal Navy).

== 23 January ==
List of shipwrecks: 23 January 1945
Ship	State	Description
Daikyo Maru	Japan	World War II: Convoy MOTA-32: The Standard Type 1K ore carrier (a.k.a. Taikyo Maru) was torpedoed and sunk when her cargo of munitions exploded in Namkwan Harbour, China (27°02′N 120°27′E) by USS Barb (United States Navy). A total of 360 troops, 28 gunners, and 56 crewmen were lost. Six Daihatsu-class landing craft and two Shohatsu-class landing craft were lost as cargo.
Halo	United Kingdom	World War II: The cargo ship (2,365 GRT, 1919) was torpedoed and sunk in the North Sea by S 168 and S 176 (both Kriegsmarine). All 27 men aboard (22 crew and 5 gunners) were saved.
Hozan I-Go	Japan	World War II: The tanker struck a mine and sank in the Indian Ocean north of Sumatra, Netherlands East Indies.
I-48	Imperial Japanese Navy	World War II: The Type C2 submarine was depth charged and sunk in the Pacific Ocean 12 nautical miles (22 km; 14 mi) north west of Yap, Caroline Islands (09°55′N 138°17′E) by USS Conklin and USS Corbesier (both United States Navy). All 122 crewmen were killed.
Kainan Maru No. 7	Imperial Japanese Navy	World War II: The auxiliary guard boat was torpedoed and sunk in the Pacific Ocean north of the Bonin Islands by USS Sennet (United States Navy).
HMS LCM 1131	Royal Navy	The landing craft mechanized (22/52 t, 1943) was lost on this date.
Nikkaku Maru	Japan	World War II: The transport ship struck a mine and sank in the Indian Ocean north of Sumatra.
S 199	Kriegsmarine	The Type 1939/40 Schnellboot was sunk in the North Sea in a collision with S 701 (Kriegsmarine). Five crew died, the other were rescued by the British.
Taian Maru	Japan	World War II: The cargo ship was torpedoed and sunk in the Pacific Ocean off Palau by USS Gar (United States Navy).
Vigsnes	United Kingdom	World War II: Convoy MH 1: The cargo ship (1,599 GRT, 1930) was torpedoed and sunk in the Irish Sea (53°32′N 4°19′W) by U-1172 (Kriegsmarine). All 25 crew survived.

== 24 January ==
List of shipwrecks: 24 January 1945
Ship	State	Description
Alcoa Banner	United States	World War II: The cargo ship was severely damaged at Antwerp, Belgium in an attack by Luftwaffe aircraft. She was declared a constructive total loss.
Empire Rupert	United Kingdom	The Larch-class tug (487 GRT, 1943) collided with HMS Twickenham (Royal Navy) and sank in the English Channel 10 nautical miles (19 km) off Dover, Kent (51°03′N 1°32′E).
USS Extractor	United States Navy	World War II: The Anchor-class rescue and salvage ship was accidentally torpedoed and sunk in the Philippine Sea (15°44′N 135°29′E) by USS Guardfish (United States Navy) with the loss of six of her 65 crew. The survivors were rescued by USS Guardfish.
25 Shin'yō suicide motorboats	Imperial Japanese Navy	World War II: The Shin'yō-class suicide motorboats were sunk/destroyed during an attack by US aircraft on Corregidor, Manila Bay.
Shigure	Imperial Japanese Navy	World War II: The Shiratsuyu-class destroyer was torpedoed and sunk in the Gulf of Siam (6°00′N 103°48′E) by USS Blackfin (United States Navy) with the loss of 37 of her 307 crew. Survivors were rescued by Kanju and Miyake (both Imperial Japanese Navy).
Showa Maru No. 7 Go	Imperial Japanese Navy	World War II: The auxiliary minesweeper was shelled and sunk in the Pacific Ocean north east of Iwo Jima (24°50′N 141°22′E) by USS Fanning and USS Dunlap (both United States Navy).
Taimam Maru No. 1	Japan	World War II: The cargo ship was torpedoed and sunk in the South China Sea by USS Atule (United States Navy).
Tungenes	Norway	World War II: The coaster (560 GRT, 1922) was shelled and sunk in the North Sea off Lista, Norway by German shore-based artillery. All crew survived.

== 25 January ==
List of shipwrecks: 25 January 1945
Ship	State	Description
Bjergfin	Norway	World War II: Convoy BE-156-AL: The coaster (648 GRT, 1917) was bombed and sunk in Eidsfjord, Norway by Allied aircraft with the loss of a crew member.
CHa-25	Imperial Japanese Navy	World War II: The CHa-1-class auxiliary submarine chaser was sunk off Kyushu, possibly by a mine or submarine.
Ilse Fritzen	Germany	World War II: Convoy BE-156-AL: The cargo ship was bombed and sunk in Eidsfjord by Allied aircraft.
Keinan Maru	Imperial Japanese Navy	The auxiliary minesweeper was lost on this date.
Malay Maru	Japan	World War II: The cargo ship was torpedoed and sunk in the East China Sea by USS Silversides (United States Navy).
Miyatake Maru No. 5 Go	Imperial Japanese Navy	The auxiliary submarine chaser was lost on this date.
Pergamon	Germany	World War II: The cargo ship was bombed and sunk by aircraft off Kristiansund, Norway.
USS YMS-30	United States Navy	World War II: The YMS-1-class minesweeper was sunk by a mine off Anzio, Italy (41°23′N 12°45′W).

== 26 January ==
List of shipwrecks: 26 January 1945
Ship	State	Description
F 978	Kriegsmarine	World War II: The MFP-D landing craft was sunk by enemy action while taking part in an operation to evacuate troops from Memel to Pillau. 13 crew were killed.
Kyo Maru No. 13 Go	Imperial Japanese Navy	World War II: The auxiliary submarine chaser was sunk by a mine off Bangeri Point.
HMS LCP(R) 1018	Royal Navy	The landing craft personnel (mortar) was lost on this date.
USS LCT-1151	United States Navy	World War II: The landing craft tank (5.9/8.2 t, 1943) was lost during an amphibious operation in the Pacific Ocean north of New Guinea (01°00′N 138°36′E).
M-538	Kriegsmarine	The salvaged, but unrepaired, Type 1916 minesweeper foundered in a storm at Hela, Pomerania.
HMS Manners	Royal Navy	World War II: The Captain-class frigate (1,192/1,436 t, 1943) was torpedoed and severely damaged in the Irish Sea 21 nautical miles (39 km; 24 mi) west of the Isle of Man by U-1051 (Kriegsmarine) with the loss of 43 of her 100 crew. The ship broke in two, with the stern section sinking. The bow section was towed to Barrow-in-Furness, Lancashire. Declared a total loss.
HNoMS MTB-712	Royal Norwegian Navy	The Fairmile D motor torpedo boat was wrecked in the Shetland Islands.
Tamon Maru No. 15	Japan	World War II: The cargo ship struck a mine and sank in the Gulf of Siam off the west coast of French Indochina.
U-1051	Kriegsmarine	World War II: The Type VII submarine was depth charged and damaged in the Irish Sea south of the Isle of Man (53°39′N 5°23′W) by HMS Aylmer, HMS Bentinck and HMS Calder (all Royal Navy). She surfaced and was rammed and sunk by HMS Aylmer with the loss of all 47 crew.

== 27 January ==
List of shipwrecks: 27 January 1945
Ship	State	Description
F 1072	Kriegsmarine	World War II: The MFP-C landing craft was badly damaged by Soviet artillery in Memel on 26 January. It was towed out of the area by F 506 (Kriegsmarine) but get stuck in ice and was abandoned.
Havbris	Norway	The cargo ship (1,316 GRT, 1919) foundered off Kristiansand, Norway with the loss of fourteen crew.
USS PT-338	United States Navy	World War II: The ELCO 80'-class PT boat was wrecked off Somimara, Luzon, Philippines (12°06′N 121°23′E). She was scuttled on 28 January.
Solør	Norway	World War II: Convoy HX 332: The tanker (8,262 GRT, 1938) was torpedoed and damaged in the St George's Channel (52°35′N 5°18′W) by U-825 (Kriegsmarine) with the loss of four of her 44 crew. Survivors were rescued by Zamalek (United Kingdom). She was taken in tow and beached in Oxwich Bay, where she broke in two in February and was declared a total loss. The bow section was refloated and scrapped at Briton Ferry Glamorgan; the stern section was scrapped in situ in July 1952.
U-1172	Kriegsmarine	World War II: The Type VIIC/41 submarine was depth charged and sunk in St. George's Channel (52°24′N 5°42′W) by HMS Bligh, HMS Keats and HMS Tyler (all Royal Navy) with the loss of all 52 crew.
Wa-102	Imperial Japanese Navy	World War II: The auxiliary minesweeper was torpedoed and sunk in the Lombok Strait (08°37′S 115°39′E) by USS Bergall (United States Navy).

== 28 January ==
List of shipwrecks: 28 January 1945
Ship	State	Description
J. M.	Norway	World War II: The coaster (164 GRT, 1943) was bombed and sunk in the Norwegian Sea off Larsnes, Norway by Allied aircraft. All crew survived.
Kume	Imperial Japanese Navy	World War II: Convoy HI-19: The United Kingdomuru-class escort ship was torpedoed and sunk off Kokuzan To northeast of Shanghai in the Yellow Sea (33°54′N 122°55′E) by USS Spadefish (United States Navy). 89 crewmen lost. Survivors rescued by Kamikaze (Imperial Japanese Navy).
Nozaki	Imperial Japanese Navy	World War II: The ammunition transport struck a mine and sank in the South China Sea off "Pulo Gambier".
R-57	Kriegsmarine	The Type R-41 minesweeper was sunk in Trondheim Fjord in a collision with U-1163 (Kriegsmarine).
Sanuki Maru	Imperial Japanese Navy	World War II: Convoy HI-19: The transport was torpedoed and sunk northeast of Shanghai in the Yellow Sea (33°54′N 122°55′E) by USS Spadefish (United States Navy). 78 Shin'yō-class suicide motorboats were lost as cargo. 330 naval personnel and her commanding officer were killed. Survivors rescued by Kamikaze (Imperial Japanese Navy).
Varp	Norway	World War II: The fishing vessel (114 GRT, 1942) was bombed and sunk in Røvdefjord, Norway.
Viborg	Denmark	World War II: The cargo ship was torpedoed and sunk in the Baltic Sea off Rügenwalde, Pomerania, Germany (54°26′N 16°20′E) by K-51 (Soviet Navy). All 21 crew survived.

== 29 January ==
List of shipwrecks: 29 January 1945
Ship	State	Description
Clyde Maru	Imperial Japanese Army	World War II: Convoy MOTA-33: The Yoshida Maru No. 1-class transport was torpedoed and sunk in the Formosa Strait 40 nautical miles (74 km) north of Keelung, Formosa (25°20′N 121°06′E) by USS Barb and USS Picuda (both United States Navy). Of 1,577 troops and crew on board, 972 troops, 66 gunners and 61 crew were killed.
F 5	Kriegsmarine	World War II: The F-class escort ship was damaged by a mine between Copenhagen, Denmark and Swinemünde, Pomerania. She hit a wreck while under tow, capsized and sank. 64 crew were killed.
Henry Lutgens	Germany	World War II: The cargo ship was lost to a torpedo attack or mine south of Ventspils, Latvia.
USS Serpens	United States Coast Guard	The US Coast Guard-crewed US Navy Crater-class cargo ship was sunk by an explosion whilst loading depth charges at Lunga Beach, Guadalcanal, Solomon Islands. The explosion killed 198 of her 208 crew, plus 57 stevedores on the ship and another person ashore.
Takunan Maru No. 10	Imperial Japanese Navy	World War II: Convoy 3126: The auxiliary submarine chaser was damaged by rockets fired by North American B-25 Mitchell aircraft and sank under tow in the Pacific Ocean north west of Kitano Island (27°45′N 142°00′E). Two crewmen were killed.
U-763	Kriegsmarine	World War II: The Type VIIC submarine was severely damaged at Schichau Shipyard, Königsberg, East Prussia in a Soviet air raid on 24 January and was scuttled at (54°42′N 20°32′E).

== 30 January ==
List of shipwrecks: 30 January 1945
Ship	State	Description
Issei Maru	Japan	World War II: The cargo ship was torpedoed and sunk in the Pacific Ocean south of Honshu by USS Threadfin (United States Navy).
HMS LCV 814	Royal Navy	The landing craft vehicle (8/11 t, 1943) was lost on this date.
Memel	Kriegsmarine	World War II: Operation Hannibal: The submarine tender struck a mine and sank in the Baltic Sea with the loss of about 600 lives.
HMS MMS-248	Royal Navy	World War II: The MMS-class minesweeper (255/295 t, 1943) struck a mine and sank in the North Sea off mouth of the Scheldt, Netherlands.
USS Pontiac	United States Navy	The refrigerated cargo ship foundered in Halifax Harbour off McNabs Island, Nova Scotia, Canada (44°36′40″N 63°32′02″W). She was raised on 17 February and subsequently passed to the United States Maritime Commission in May 1945.
Takunan Maru No. 10 Go	Imperial Japanese Navy	The auxiliary submarine chaser was lost on this date.
Wilhelm Gustloff	Kriegsmarine	World War II: Operation Hannibal: The ocean liner was torpedoed by S-13 (Soviet Navy) in the Baltic Sea east of Leba, Poland 55°04′22″N 17°25′17″E. She sank with about 9,000 casualties: Thought to be the greatest loss of lives in a single ship incident in history. Survivors were rescued by Löwe, M 341, M 375, M 387, T36, TF 19, V 1703 Unitas 4 (all Kriegsmarine), Gotland and Gottingen (both Germany).

== 31 January ==
List of shipwrecks: 31 January 1945
Ship	State	Description
Berlin	Germany	World War II: Operation Hannibal: The hospital ship struck a mine and sank in the Baltic Sea off Swinemünde (56°02′36″N 14°19′00″E) with the loss of one life. She was refloated in 1949 and was rebuilt between September 1951 and May 1957, when she entered Soviet service as Admiral Nakhimov.
Cook Inlet	United States	The 30-gross register ton, 47.8-foot (14.6 m) motor vessel sank near Afognak, Territory of Alaska, in Afognak Bay (58°00′30″N 152°46′00″W) on the coast of Afognak Island in the Kodiak Archipelago.
Daietsu Maru	Japan	World War II: Convoy HI-88B: The tanker (a.k.a. Taietsu Maru) was torpedoed and damaged in the South China Sea south east of Quảng Ngãi, French Indochina (14°56′N 109°00′E) by USS Boarfish (United States Navy) and beached on the coast to prevent sinking. Bombed and destroyed the next day by Consolidated B-24 Liberator aircraft of the United States Fourteenth Air Force. Two gunners and seven crewmen were killed.
Enki Maru	Japan	World War II: Convoy HI-88B: The tanker was torpedoed and sunk in the South China Sea south east of Quảng Ngãi (14°56′N 109°00′E) by USS Boarfish (United States Navy). Twenty-one passengers and a crewman were killed. Survivors were rescued by Nomi (Imperial Japanese Navy).
L'Ardent	French Navy	The L'Eveille-class escort was sunk in a collision at Casablanca.
M-382	Kriegsmarine	World War II: The minesweeper was torpedoed and sunk in the Norwegian Sea off Molde, Norway by HNoMS MTB 715 (Royal Norwegian Navy).
Mediceo	Germany	The cargo ship was bombed and sunk by British aircraft off Tagliamento, Italy.
USS PC-1129	United States Navy	World War II: The PC-461-class submarine chaser was sunk in the South China Sea south of the entrance to Manila Bay, Luzon, Philippines (14°05′N 120°30′E) by a Japanese Shin'yō-class suicide motorboat. She sank two other Shin'yōs before being sunk.
Ro-115	Imperial Japanese Navy	World War II: The Ro-100-class submarine was depth charged and sunk in the South China Sea west of Mindoro, Philippines (13°20′N 119°20′E) by USS Bell, USS Cavalier, USS O'Bannon and USS Ulvert M. Moore. Lost with all 59 crew.
U-3520	Kriegsmarine	World War II: The Type XXI submarine struck a mine and sank in the Baltic Sea off the Bülk Lighthouse, Schleswig-Holstein (54°28′N 10°12′E) with the loss of all 85 crew.
Ume	Imperial Japanese Navy	World War II: The Matsu-class destroyer was sunk 20 nautical miles (37 km; 23 mi) south of Formosa (22°30′N 122°00′E) by United States Army North American B-25 Mitchell and Lockheed P-38 Lightning aircraft of the United States Fourteenth Air Force. Seventy-seven crew were killed and 36 were wounded.

== Unknown date ==
List of shipwrecks: Unknown date 1945
Ship	State	Description
Christian Radich	Kriegsmarine	World War II: The training ship was sunk by Allied bombers at Flensburg, Germany. Raised post-war and returned to Norwegian owners.
Herold	Norway	World War II: The cargo ship (95 GRT, 1865) was bombed and sunk at Bergen, Norway in December 1944 or January 1945.
HMS LCV(P) 1191	Royal Navy	The landing craft vehicle and personnel was lost sometime in January.
Kanzyu Maru	Imperial Japanese Navy	World War II: The cargo ship was sunk at Saigon, French Indo-China by United States Navy aircraft.
M-381	Kriegsmarine	World War II: The minesweeper was torpedoed and sunk on 31 January 1945 by HNoMS MTB 716 (Royal Norwegian Navy) off Kristiansund, Norway. Of the 85 crew on board, 45 were killed; or was torpedoed and sunk on 12 February by HMS Venturer (Royal Navy) off Kristiansund.
Nanshin Maru No. 26	Imperial Japanese Navy	World War II: The guard boat was torpedoed and sunk in the Pacific Ocean. Either by USS Threadfin (United States Navy) on 30 January, or by USS Bowfin (United States Navy) on 17 February.
S-154	Kriegsmarine	World War II: The TM 51-class motor torpedo boat was sunk at Pola, Adriatic Littoral Zone by Allied aircraft sometime in January.
U-382	Kriegsmarine	World War II: The Type VIIC submarine was bombed and sunk at Wilhelmshaven, Lower Saxony in an Allied air raid. Raised on 20 March but stricken from navy register.
U-480	Kriegsmarine	World War II: The Type VIIC submarine struck a mine and sank in the English Channel south of the Isle of Wight (50°22′41″N 1°44′10″W) on or after 29 January with the loss of all 48 crew.
U-650	Kriegsmarine	World War II: The Type VIIC submarine was hedgehogged and sunk in the Atlantic Ocean (49°51′N 5°29′W) after 7 January by an Allied naval vessel with the loss of all 47 crew.
V 204 Zeiten	Kriegsmarine	The naval whaler/Vorpostenboot was lost sometime in December.
U-1020	Kriegsmarine	World War II: The Type VIIC/41 submarine was sunk by a mine in North Sea off Dundee, Scotland, at 56°32′42″N 001°18′54″W on or after 9 January with the loss of all 52 crew members.
Wuppertal	Kriegsmarine	The weather ship was lost in the Atlantic Ocean during January.
USS YCF-59	United States Navy	The non-self-propelled car float was lost off the coast of Delaware sometime in January.
YU-3	Imperial Japanese Army	World War II: The YU-1-class submarine was scuttled in Lingayen Gulf.
