= Operation Mike =

Operation Mike may refer to:

- Operation MIKE, the series of American landings at Luzon between 9 January 1945 and 31 January 1945.
- 1950 Douglas C-54D disappearance, the search for the Douglas C-54 Skymaster serial number 42-72469.
