= German submarine U-1232 =

German World War II submarine

History

Nazi Germany
- Name: U-1232
- Ordered: 14 October 1941
- Builder: Deutsche Werft AG, Hamburg
- Yard number: 395
- Laid down: 14 April 1943
- Launched: 20 December 1943
- Commissioned: 8 March 1944
- Out of service: April 1945
- Fate: Captured in May 1945; Sank under tow on 4 March 1946
- Notes: Foundered and sunk while being towed to scuttling grounds.

General characteristics
- Class & type: Type IXC/40 submarine
- Displacement: 1,144 t (1,126 long tons) surfaced; 1,257 t (1,237 long tons) submerged
- Length: 76.76 m (251 ft 10 in) o/a; 58.75 m (192 ft 9 in) pressure hull
- Beam: 6.86 m (22 ft 6 in) o/a; 4.44 m (14 ft 7 in) pressure hull
- Height: 9.60 m (31 ft 6 in)
- Draught: 4.67 m (15 ft 4 in)
- Installed power: 4,400 PS (3,200 kW; 4,300 bhp) (diesels); 1,000 PS (740 kW; 990 shp) (electric)
- Propulsion: 2 shafts; 2 × diesel engines; 2 × electric motors
- Speed: 18.3 knots (33.9 km/h; 21.1 mph) surfaced; 7.3 knots (13.5 km/h; 8.4 mph) submerged
- Range: 13,850 nmi (25,650 km; 15,940 mi) at 10 knots (19 km/h; 12 mph) surfaced; 63 nmi (117 km; 72 mi) at 4 knots (7.4 km/h; 4.6 mph) submerged
- Complement: 4 officers, 44 enlisted
- Armament: 6 × torpedo tubes (4 bow, 2 stern); 22 × 53.3 cm (21 in) torpedoes; 1 × 3.7 cm (1.5 in) Flak M42 AA gun; 2 x twin 2 cm (0.79 in) C/30 AA guns

Service record
- Part of: 31st U-boat Flotilla; 8 March – 31 October 1944; 33rd U-boat Flotilla; 1 November 1944 – 8 May 1945
- Identification codes: M 49 759
- Commanders: Kapt.z.S. Kurt Dobratz; 8 March 1944 – 31 March 1945; Oblt.z.S. Götz Roth; 1 – 27 April 1945
- Operations: 1 patrol: 10 November 1944 – 14 February 1945
- Victories: 3 merchant ships sunk (17,355 GRT); 1 merchant ship total loss (7,176 GRT); 1 merchant ship damaged (2,373 GRT)

German submarine U-1232 was a Type IX U-boat of Nazi Germany's Kriegsmarine during World War II.

== Design ==
German Type IXC/40 submarines were slightly larger than the original Type IXCs. U-1232 had a displacement of 1,144 tonnes (1,126 long tons) when at the surface and 1,257 tonnes (1,237 long tons) while submerged. The U-boat had a total length of 76.76 m (251 ft 10 in), a pressure hull length of 58.75 m (192 ft 9 in), a beam of 6.86 m (22 ft 6 in), a height of 9.60 m (31 ft 6 in), and a draught of 4.67 m (15 ft 4 in). The submarine was powered by two MAN M 9 V 40/46 supercharged four-stroke, nine-cylinder diesel engines producing a total of 4,400 metric horsepower (3,240 kW; 4,340 shp) for use while surfaced, two Siemens-Schuckert 2 GU 345/34 double-acting electric motors producing a total of 1,000 shaft horsepower (1,010 PS; 750 kW) for use while submerged. She had two shafts and two 1.92 m (6 ft) propellers. The boat was capable of operating at depths of up to 230 metres (750 ft).

The submarine had a maximum surface speed of 18.3 knots (33.9 km/h; 21.1 mph) and a maximum submerged speed of 7.3 knots (13.5 km/h; 8.4 mph). When submerged, the boat could operate for 63 nautical miles (117 km; 72 mi) at 4 knots (7.4 km/h; 4.6 mph); when surfaced, she could travel 13,850 nautical miles (25,650 km; 15,940 mi) at 10 knots (19 km/h; 12 mph). U-1232 was fitted with six 53.3 cm (21 in) torpedo tubes (four fitted at the bow and two at the stern), 22 torpedoes, and a 3.7 cm (1.5 in) Flak M42 as well as two twin 2 cm (0.79 in) C/30 anti-aircraft guns. The boat had a complement of forty-eight.

== Service history ==
She made one offensive patrol, from November 1944 until February 1945, to North America. On 14 January 1945, the boat torpedoed and sank three ships within 13 minutes near Halifax Harbour off the Atlantic coast of Canada. During this action she was damaged so severely that she was forced to return to base.

=== Fate ===
In May 1945 the British military captured U-1232 at Wesermünde, Germany. On 4 March 1946 the boat sank at 54°11′N 07°24′E after she foundered whilst being towed to the scuttling grounds.

== Summary of raiding history ==
Date	Ship Name	Nationality	Tonnage (GRT)	Fate
4 January 1945	Nipiwan Park	Canada	2,373	Damaged
4 January 1945	Polarland	Norway	1,591	Sunk
14 January 1945	Athelviking	United Kingdom	8,779	Sunk
14 January 1945	British Freedom	United Kingdom	6,985	Sunk
14 January 1945	Martin Van Buren	United States	7,176	Total loss

== Bibliography ==
- Busch, Rainer; Röll, Hans-Joachim (1999). German U-boat commanders of World War II : a biographical dictionary. Translated by Brooks, Geoffrey. London, Annapolis, Md: Greenhill Books, Naval Institute Press. ISBN 1-55750-186-6.
- Busch, Rainer; Röll, Hans-Joachim (1999). Deutsche U-Boot-Verluste von September 1939 bis Mai 1945 [German U-boat losses from September 1939 to May 1945]. Der U-Boot-Krieg (in German). Vol. IV. Hamburg, Berlin, Bonn: Mittler. ISBN 3-8132-0514-2.
- Gröner, Erich; Jung, Dieter; Maass, Martin (1991). German Warships 1815–1945, U-boats and Mine Warfare Vessels. Vol. 2. Translated by Thomas, Keith; Magowan, Rachel. London: Conway Maritime Press. ISBN 0-85177-593-4.
