= German submarine U-1055 =

German World War II submarine

History

Nazi Germany
- Name: U-1055
- Ordered: 5 June 1941
- Builder: Germaniawerft, Kiel
- Yard number: 689
- Laid down: 30 March 1943
- Launched: 9 March 1944
- Commissioned: 8 April 1944
- Fate: Missing since 23 April 1945

General characteristics
- Class & type: Type VIIC submarine
- Displacement: 769 tonnes (757 long tons) surfaced; 871 t (857 long tons) submerged
- Length: 67.10 m (220 ft 2 in) o/a; 50.50 m (165 ft 8 in) pressure hull
- Beam: 6.20 m (20 ft 4 in) o/a; 4.70 m (15 ft 5 in) pressure hull
- Height: 9.60 m (31 ft 6 in)
- Draught: 4.74 m (15 ft 7 in)
- Installed power: 2,800–3,200 PS (2,100–2,400 kW; 2,800–3,200 bhp) (diesels); 750 PS (550 kW; 740 shp) (electric)
- Propulsion: 2 shafts; 2 × diesel engines; 2 × electric motors
- Speed: 17.7 knots (32.8 km/h; 20.4 mph) surfaced; 7.6 knots (14.1 km/h; 8.7 mph) submerged
- Range: 8,500 nmi (15,700 km; 9,800 mi) at 10 knots (19 km/h; 12 mph) surfaced; 80 nmi (150 km; 92 mi) at 4 knots (7.4 km/h; 4.6 mph) submerged
- Test depth: 230 m (750 ft); Crush depth: 250–295 m (820–968 ft)
- Complement: 4 officers, 40–56 enlisted
- Armament: 5 × 53.3 cm (21 in) torpedo tubes (4 bow, 1 stern); 14 × torpedoes or 26 TMA mines; 1 × 8.8 cm (3.46 in) deck gun (220 rounds); 1 × 3.7 cm (1.5 in) Flak M42 AA gun; 2 × twin 2 cm (0.79 in) C/30 anti-aircraft guns

Service record
- Part of: 5th U-boat Flotilla; 8 April – 30 November 1944; 11th U-boat Flotilla; 1 December 1944 – 23 April 1945
- Identification codes: M 04 059
- Commanders: Oblt.z.S. Rudolf Meyer; 8 April 1944 – 23 April 1945
- Operations: 2 patrols: 1st patrol: a. 11 December 1944 – 1 February 1945; b. 22 – 23 March 1945; 2nd patrol: 5 – 23 April 1945
- Victories: 4 merchant ships sunk (19,413 GRT)

German submarine U-1055 was a Type VIIC U-boat built for Nazi Germany's Kriegsmarine for service during World War II. She was laid down on 30 March 1943 by Friedrich Krupp Germaniawerft, Kiel as yard number 689, launched on 9 March 1944 and commissioned on 8 April 1944 under Oberleutnant zur See Rudolf Meyer.

She was fitted with a Schnorchel underwater breathing apparatus in November 1944.

== Design ==
German Type VIIC submarines were preceded by the shorter Type VIIB submarines. U-1055 had a displacement of 769 tonnes (757 long tons) when at the surface and 871 tonnes (857 long tons) while submerged. She had a total length of 67.10 m (220 ft 2 in), a pressure hull length of 50.50 m (165 ft 8 in), a beam of 6.20 m (20 ft 4 in), a height of 9.60 m (31 ft 6 in), and a draught of 4.74 m (15 ft 7 in). The submarine was powered by two Germaniawerft F46 four-stroke, six-cylinder supercharged diesel engines producing a total of 2,800 to 3,200 metric horsepower (2,060 to 2,350 kW; 2,760 to 3,160 shp) for use while surfaced, two AEG GU 460/8–27 double-acting electric motors producing a total of 750 metric horsepower (550 kW; 740 shp) for use while submerged. She had two shafts and two 1.23 m (4 ft) propellers. The boat was capable of operating at depths of up to 230 metres (750 ft).

The submarine had a maximum surface speed of 17.7 knots (32.8 km/h; 20.4 mph) and a maximum submerged speed of 7.6 knots (14.1 km/h; 8.7 mph). When submerged, the boat could operate for 80 nautical miles (150 km; 92 mi) at 4 knots (7.4 km/h; 4.6 mph); when surfaced, she could travel 8,500 nautical miles (15,700 km; 9,800 mi) at 10 knots (19 km/h; 12 mph). U-1055 was fitted with five 53.3 cm (21 in) torpedo tubes (four fitted at the bow and one at the stern), fourteen torpedoes, one 8.8 cm (3.46 in) SK C/35 naval gun, (220 rounds), one 3.7 cm (1.5 in) Flak M42 and two twin 2 cm (0.79 in) C/30 anti-aircraft guns. The boat had a complement of between forty-four and sixty.

== Service history ==
The boat's career began with training at 5th U-boat Flotilla on 8 April 1944, followed by active service on 1 December 1944 as part of the 11th Flotilla for the remainder of her service.

In two patrols she sank four merchant ships, for a total of 19,413 gross register tons (GRT).

=== Fate ===
On 6 April 1945 U-1055 was attacked by MTB-715 and MTB-719; apparently undamaged U-1055 went missing on 23 April 1945 in the North Atlantic with no explanation after sending a message while en route to the English Channel. All hands were lost. Other accounts (Flypast April 2021) state that U-1055 was sunk west of Brest shortly after 18:00 on 30 April by an anti-submarine PBY-5 Catalina commanded by Lt. F. G. Lake of 19 Group, but this attack actually resulted in the sinking of U-1107.

== Summary of raiding history ==
Date	Ship Name	Nationality	Tonnage (GRT)	Fate
9 January 1945	Jonas Lie	United States	7,198	Sunk
11 January 1945	Roanoke	United States	2,606	Sunk
11 January 1945	Normandy Coast	United Kingdom	1,428	Sunk
15 January 1945	Maja	United Kingdom	8,181	Sunk

== Bibliography ==
- Busch, Rainer; Röll, Hans-Joachim (1999). German U-boat commanders of World War II : a biographical dictionary. Translated by Brooks, Geoffrey. London, Annapolis, Md: Greenhill Books, Naval Institute Press. ISBN 1-55750-186-6.
- Busch, Rainer; Röll, Hans-Joachim (1999). Deutsche U-Boot-Verluste von September 1939 bis Mai 1945 [German U-boat losses from September 1939 to May 1945]. Der U-Boot-Krieg (in German). Vol. IV. Hamburg, Berlin, Bonn: Mittler. ISBN 3-8132-0514-2.
- Gröner, Erich; Jung, Dieter; Maass, Martin (1991). German Warships 1815–1945, U-boats and Mine Warfare Vessels. Vol. 2. Translated by Thomas, Keith; Magowan, Rachel. London: Conway Maritime Press. ISBN 0-85177-593-4.
- Sharpe, Peter (1998). U-Boat Fact File. Great Britain: Midland Publishing. ISBN 1-85780-072-9.
