= HMS Calder (K349) =

Frigate of the Royal Navy

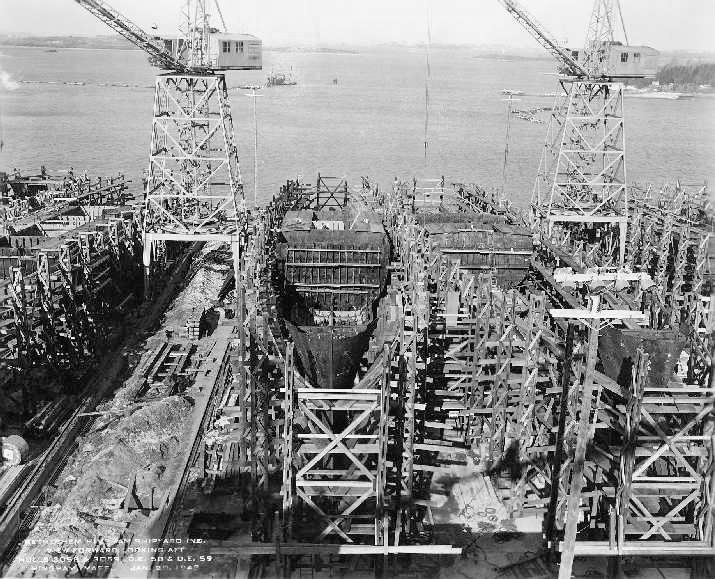
- HMS Calder (K349) under construction as USS Formoe (DE-58), with USS Foss (DE-59) on the right

History

United Kingdom
- Builder: Bethlehem-Hingham Shipyard Inc. (Hingham, Massachusetts, USA)
- Laid down: 11 December 1942
- Launched: 27 March 1943
- Commissioned: 15 July 1943
- Decommissioned: Returned to US Navy on 19 October 1945 and decommissioned on 4 December 1945
- Fate: Sold for scrap on 15 January 1948

General characteristics
- Displacement: 1,800 long tons (1,829 t) fully loaded
- Length: 306 ft (93 m) overall
- Beam: 36.5 ft (11.1 m)
- Draught: 9.5 ft (2.9 m) standard; 11.25 ft (3.43 m) full load
- Propulsion: 2 boilers, General Electric Turbo-electric drive; 2 solid manganese-bronze 3,600 lb (1,630 kg) 3-bladed propellers, 8.5 ft (2.6 m) diameter, 7 ft 7 in (2.31 m) pitch; 12,000 hp (8.9 MW); 2 rudders
- Speed: 24 knots (44 km/h)
- Endurance: 5,500 nautical miles (10,200 km) at 15 knots (28 km/h)
- Complement: Typically between 170 & 186

HMS Calder was a Captain class frigate of the Royal Navy during World War II. It was named after Admiral Sir Robert Calder, Bt. KCB, who was appointed Captain of the Fleet to Admiral John Jervis in 1796, and saw action at the battle of Cape St Vincent on 14 February 1797. Originally destined for the US Navy as a turbo-electric (TE) type Buckley-class destroyer escort, HMS Calder was provisionally given the name USS Formoe. However, the delivery was diverted to the Royal Navy before the launch.

== Actions ==
HMS Calder served exclusively with the 4th Escort Group, earning battle honours for service in the North Atlantic.

On 26 January 1945 the submarine U-1051 was sunk in the Irish Sea south of the Isle of Man, at position 53°39′N 05°23′W by the frigates HMS Aylmer, HMS Bentinck, HMS Calder and HMS Manners. U-1051 was forced to the surface by the use of depth charges. A gun battle then ensued, with U-1051 finally sinking after it had been rammed by HMS Aylmer. This action resulted in the loss of all hands (47) from the crew of U-1051. It was entirely clear that the ramming of U-1051 by HMS Aylmer was intentional and that Cdr B.W.Taylor was not removed from command of HMS Aylmer shortly after this incident (see the article on HMS Aylmer for more information).

On 8 April 1945 the submarine U-774 was sunk in the North Atlantic south-west of Ireland, at position 49°58′N 11°51′W, by the frigates HMS Bentinck and HMS Calder. U-774 was attacked by the use of depth charges after its periscope was spotted by a lookout on HMS Calder. This action resulted in loss of all hands (44) aboard U-774.

== General information ==
- Pennant (UK): K 349
- Pennant (US): DE 58
