= HM LST-415 =

1942 LST-1-class tank landing ship

History

United Kingdom
- Name: LST-415
- Ordered: as a Type S3-M-K2 hull, MCE hull 935
- Builder: Bethlehem-Fairfield Shipyard, Baltimore, Maryland
- Yard number: 2187
- Laid down: 29 October 1942
- Launched: 21 November 1942
- Commissioned: 19 January 1943
- Stricken: 2 June 1945
- Identification: Hull symbol: LST-415
- Fate: Sold for scrapping, January 1948

General characteristics
- Class & type: LST-1-class tank landing ship
- Displacement: 4,080 long tons (4,145 t) full load; 2,160 long tons (2,190 t) landing
- Length: 328 ft (100 m) oa
- Beam: 50 ft (15 m)
- Draft: Full load: 8 ft 2 in (2.49 m) forward; 14 ft 1 in (4.29 m) aft; Landing at 2,160 t: 3 ft 11 in (1.19 m) forward; 9 ft 10 in (3.00 m) aft
- Installed power: 2 × 900 hp (670 kW) Electro-Motive Diesel 12-567A diesel engines; 1,700 shp (1,300 kW)
- Propulsion: 1 × Falk main reduction gears; 2 × Propellers
- Speed: 12 kn (22 km/h; 14 mph)
- Range: 24,000 nmi (44,000 km; 28,000 mi) at 9 kn (17 km/h; 10 mph) while displacing 3,960 long tons (4,024 t)
- Boats & landing craft carried: 2 or 6 x LCVPs
- Capacity: 2,100 tons oceangoing maximum; 350 tons main deckload
- Troops: 163
- Complement: 117
- Armament: Varied, ultimate armament; 1 × QF 12-pounder 12 cwt naval gun; 6 × 20 mm (0.79 in) Oerlikon cannon; 4 × Fast Aerial Mine (FAM) mounts

HMS LST-415 was a United States Navy LST-1-class tank landing ship that was transferred to the Royal Navy during World War II. As with many of her class, the ship was never named. Instead, she was referred to by her hull designation.

== Construction ==
LST-415 was laid down on 29 October 1942, under United States Maritime Commission (MARCOM) contract, MC hull 935, by the Bethlehem-Fairfield Shipyard, Baltimore, Maryland; launched 21 November 1942; then transferred to the United Kingdom and commissioned on 19 January 1943.

== Service history ==
LST-415 saw no active service in the United States Navy.

She was torpedoed at 03:00 by a German E-boat and beached off Thurrock, England, on 16 January 1945.

The tank landing ship was returned to United States Navy custody and struck from the Navy list on 2 June 1945. The ship was sold to a local British firm in January 1948, and subsequently scrapped in Grays, England.

== See also ==
- List of United States Navy LSTs

== Notes ==
Citations

== Bibliography ==
Online resources

- "LST-415". Dictionary of American Naval Fighting Ships. Naval History and Heritage Command. This article incorporates text from this source, which is in the public domain.
- "Bethlehem-Fairfield, Baltimore MD". ShipbuildingHistory.com. 14 August 2008.
- "USS LST-415". NavSource. 12 February 2010.
- Helgason, Guðmundur. "HMS LST-415". German U-boats of WWII - uboat.net.
