= HMS Manners (K568) =

Frigate of the Royal Navy

History

United States
- Name: unnamed (DE-523)
- Builder: Boston Navy Yard, Boston, Massachusetts
- Laid down: 14 August 1943
- Launched: 24 September 1943
- Completed: 16 December 1943
- Fate: Transferred to United Kingdom 16 December 1943
- Acquired: Returned by United Kingdom 8 November 1945
- Stricken: 19 December 1945
- Fate: Sold 3 December 1946 for scrapping; Scrapped 1947

United Kingdom
- Name: HMS Manners (K568)
- Namesake: Lord Robert Manners
- Acquired: 16 December 1943
- Commissioned: 16 December 1943
- Decommissioned: 1945
- Fate: Constructive total loss 26 January 1945; Returned to United States 8 November 1945

General characteristics
- Displacement: 1,140 long tons (1,158 t)
- Length: 289.5 ft (88.2 m)
- Beam: 35 ft (11 m)
- Draught: 9 ft (2.7 m)
- Propulsion: Four General Motors 278A 16-cylinder engines; GE 7,040 bhp (5,250 kW) generators (4,800 kW); GE electric motors for 6,000 shp (4,500 kW); Two shafts
- Speed: 20 knots (37 km/h)
- Range: 5,000 nautical miles (9,260 km) at 15 knots (28 km/h)
- Complement: 156
- Sensors & processing systems: SA & SL type radars; Type 144 series Asdic; MF Direction Finding antenna; HF Direction Finding Type FH 4 antenna
- Armament: 3 × 3 in (76 mm) /50 Mk.22 guns; 1 × twin Bofors 40 mm mount Mk.I; 7–16 × 20 mm Oerlikon guns; Mark 10 Hedgehog antisubmarine mortar; Depth charges; QF 2-pounder naval gun

The second HMS Manners (K568) was a British Captain-class frigate of the Royal Navy in commission during World War II. Originally constructed as the United States Navy Evarts-class destroyer escort DE-523, she served in the Royal Navy from 1943 to 1945.

== Construction and transfer ==
The ship was laid down by the Boston Navy Yard in Boston, Massachusetts, on 14 August 1943 as the unnamed U.S. Navy destroyer escort DE-523 and launched on 24 September 1943. The ship was christened by Sara Fischer, the wife of Captain Hugo Fischer, who was the superintendent of the Boston Navy Yard at the time. The United States transferred the ship to the United Kingdom under Lend-Lease on 16 December 1943.

== Service history ==
The ship was commissioned into service in the Royal Navy as HMS Manners (K568) on 16 December 1943 simultaneously with her transfer. She served on antisubmarine patrol and convoy escort duty in the North Atlantic Ocean under the command of Captain Dennis Jermain. On 26 October 1944, Manners accidentally rammed the Royal Norwegian Navy corvette HNoMS Rose in the North Atlantic. As a result of damage suffered in the collision, Rose sank at position 45°50′N 40°15′W.

On 26 January 1945, Manners joined the British frigates HMS Aylmer, HMS Bentinck, and HMS Calder of the 4th and 5th Escort Groups in a depth-charge attack on the German submarine U-1051 in the Irish Sea about 20 nautical miles (37 km) from The Skerries, Isle of Man. During the engagement, U-1051 fired an acoustic torpedo which exploded near Manners' propellers, breaking her in two; her stern section sank, and four officers and 39 ratings were killed and 15 ratings were wounded. Aylmer, Bentinck, and Calder counterattacked, forcing U-1051 to the surface with depth charges and sinking her by ramming at position 53°39′00″N 05°23′00″W.

Manners' forward section remained afloat and was towed to Barrow-in-Furness, England, where it arrived on 27 January 1945. Beyond economical repair, she was declared a constructive total loss, and the Royal Navy soon decommissioned her. The United Kingdom returned her to the U.S. Navy in England on 8 November 1945.

== Disposal ==
The U.S. Navy struck Manners from its Naval Vessel Register on 19 December 1945. The United States sold her on 3 December 1946 for scrapping to the Athens Piraeus Electricity Company, Ltd., of Athens, Greece, for delivery to the company on 7 January 1947. She was scrapped in Piraeus, Greece, during 1947.
