= HMS Mignonette (K38) =

Royal Navy Flower-class corvette

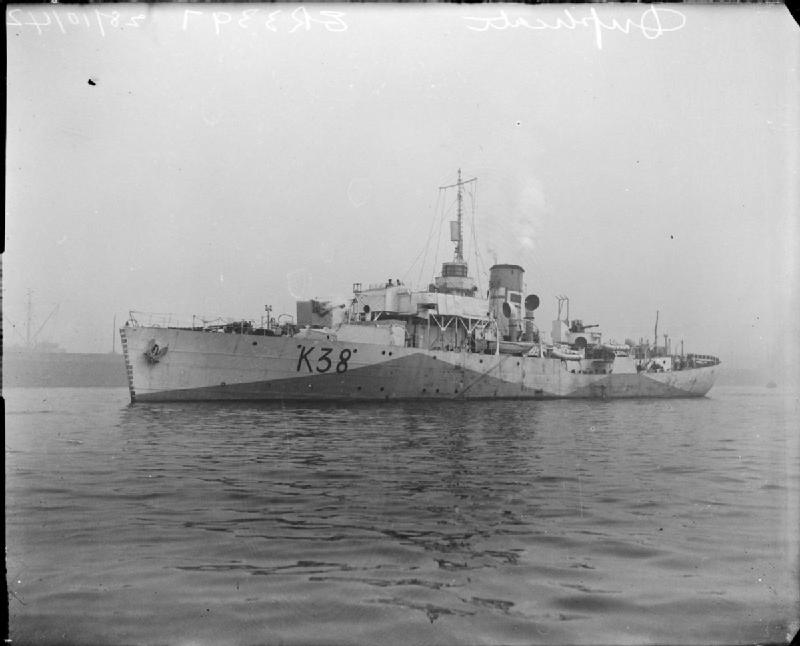
- HMS Mignotte underway on the Tyne

History

United Kingdom
- Name: Mignonette
- Ordered: 31 August 1939
- Builder: Hall, Russell & Co. Ltd., Aberdeen
- Laid down: 15 July 1940
- Launched: 28 January 1941
- Commissioned: 7 May 1941
- Out of service: 1946 - sold
- Identification: Pennant number: K38
- Fate: Sold 1946; sunk November 1948

General characteristics
- Class & type: Flower-class corvette (original)
- Displacement: 925 long tons (940 t; 1,036 short tons)
- Length: 205 ft (62.48 m)o/a
- Beam: 33 ft (10.06 m)
- Draught: 11.5 ft (3.51 m)
- Propulsion: single shaft; 2 × fire tube Scotch boilers; 1 × 4-cycle triple-expansion reciprocating steam engine; 2,750 ihp (2,050 kW)
- Speed: 16 knots (29.6 km/h)
- Range: 3,500 nautical miles (6,482 km) at 12 knots (22.2 km/h)
- Complement: 85
- Sensors & processing systems: 1 × SW1C or 2C radar; 1 × Type 123A or Type 127DV sonar
- Armament: 1 × BL 4-inch (101.6 mm) Mk.IX single gun; 2 x double Lewis machine gun; 2 × twin Vickers machine gun; 2 × Mk.II depth charge throwers; 2 × Depth charge rails with 40 depth charges; initially with minesweeper equipment, later removed

HMS Mignonette was a Flower-class corvette that served with the Royal Navy during the Second World War. She served as an escort ship in the Battle of the Atlantic.

== Background ==
The ship was commissioned on 31 August 1939 by Hall, Russell & Company from Aberdeen in Scotland.

== War service ==
On 7 February 1943, HMS Mignotte along with HMS Campanula rescued 37 survivors from the merchant ship Afrika, which had been torpedoed by the German submarine U-402. On 15 July 1943 she contributed to the sinking of U-135 alongside HMS Rochester and Balsam. On 21 January 1945 she helped sink U-1199 alongside the destroyer HMS Icarus.

== Fate ==
She was sold in 1946. In 1948, she became the merchant ship Alexandrouplis. That same year, on 30 November 1948, she was lost at sea.

== Sources ==
- Friedman, Norman (2008). British Destroyers & Frigates - The Second World War and After. Barnsley, UK: Seaforth Publishing. ISBN 978-1-84832-015-4.
- Gardiner, Robert (1987). Conway's All the World's Fighting Ships 1922-1946. London: Conway Maritime Press. ISBN 0-85177-146-7.
- Preston, Antony; Raven, Alan (1982). Flower Class Corvettes. London: Arms and Armour Press. ISBN 0-85368-559-2.
