= HMS Bentinck (K314) =

Frigate of the Royal Navy

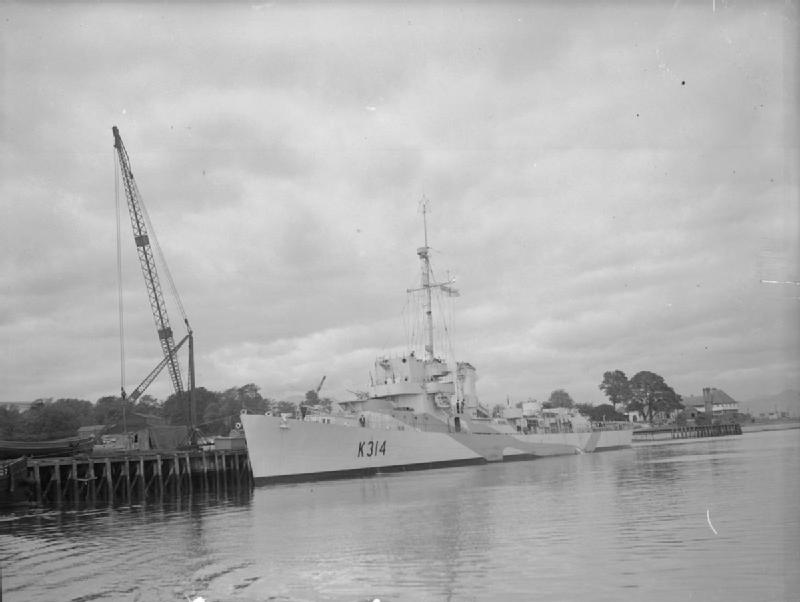

History

United Kingdom
- Builder: Bethlehem-Hingham Shipyard Inc. (Hingham, Massachusetts, US)
- Laid down: 29 June 1942
- Launched: 3 February 1943
- Commissioned: 19 May 1943
- Decommissioned: Returned to US Navy on 5 January 1946
- Fate: Sold for scrapping 26 May 1946

General characteristics
- Class & type: Buckley-class destroyer escort
- Displacement: 1,800 tons fully loaded
- Length: 306 ft (93 m) overall
- Beam: 36.5 ft (11.1 m)
- Draught: 11 ft (3.4 m) fully loaded
- Speed: 24 knots (44 km/h)
- Endurance: 5,500 nautical miles (10,200 km) at 15 knots (28 km/h)
- Complement: Typically between 170 & 180

HMS Bentinck was a Captain-class frigate during World War II. Named after John Bentinck commander of HMS Niger which participated in a number of engagements during the Seven Years' War including one in which HMS Niger defeated the French 74-gun ship of the line Diadem.

Originally destined for the US Navy as a turbo-electric (TE) type Buckley-class destroyer escort, HMS Bentinck was provisionally given the name USS Bull (later this name was reassigned to DE 693) however the delivery was diverted to the Royal Navy before the launch.

== Actions ==
HMS Bentinck served exclusively with the 4th Escort Group taking part in operations in the Arctic (Russian Convoys) and the North Atlantic.

On 26 January 1945 the submarine U-1051 was sunk in the Irish Sea south of the Isle of Man, at position 53°39′N 5°23′W by the frigates HMS Bentinck, HMS Aylmer, HMS Calder and HMS Manners. U-1051 was forced to the surface by the use of depth charges, then a gun battle ensued with U-1051 finally sinking after it had been rammed by HMS Aylmer. This action resulted in the loss of all 47 crew of U-1051.

On 8 April 1945 the submarine U-774 was sunk in the North Atlantic south-west of Ireland, at position 49°58′N 11°51′W by the frigates HMS Bentinck and HMS Calder. U-774 was attacked by the use of depth charges after its periscope was spotted by a lookout on HMS Calder. This action resulted in loss of all 44 crew aboard U-774.

On 21 April 1945, the submarine U-636 was sunk in the North Atlantic west of Ireland, at position 55°50′N 10°31′W by the frigates HMS Bentinck, HMS Bazely and HMS Drury. U-636 was attacked by the use of depth charges. This action resulted in loss of all 42 crew aboard U-636.

== General information ==
- Pennant (UK): K 314
- Pennant (US): DE 52
