= SS Otto Petersen =

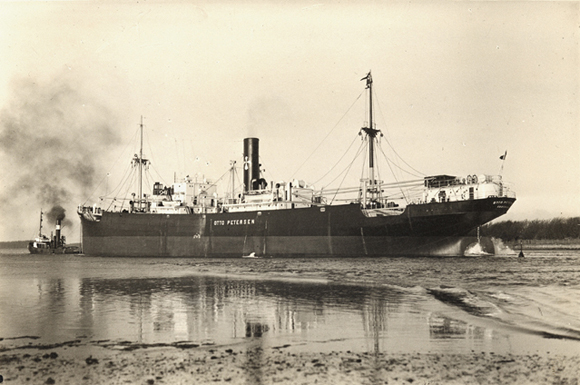

History
- Name: SS Otto Petersen
- Owner: Vendila Steamboat Company
- Builder: Helsingør Vaerft, Helsingør, Denmark
- Yard number: 194
- Completed: March 1930
- In service: 1930
- Out of service: 1954
- Identification: Call sign: OXXE
- Fate: Broken up 1971

General characteristics
- Class & type: Cargo
- Tonnage: 2932 GRT; 4965 DWT
- Length: 99.6 m (327 ft)
- Beam: 14.7 m (48 ft)
- Propulsion: single screw
- Speed: 11 knots

SS Otto Petersen was one of three ships ordered by the Vendila Steamboat Company (Svendsen & Christensen). The others were E.M. Dalgas and P.N. Damm.

SS Otto Petersen was built at the Elsinor Ironship and Machine Factory, Helsingør, Copenhagen in 1930. Once a significant shipyard that helped boost Denmark into an international maritime nation, Elsinore Shipyard closed in the 80's - a small dry dock remains.

Her captain for 24 years, Knud Valdemar Goth (1893 - 1966) joined Vendila around 1920.

SS Otto Petersen was blown in two when a mine went off in Drammen Fiord, Norway on 12 January 1945. She was raised and towed to Nakskov for repairs. In 1954 Otto Petersen was sold to Haverbeck & Skalweit, Chile and renamed Tornagaleones.
