= Operation Mike (United States) =

Operation MIKE was a series of American landings at Luzon, the principal island of the Philippines, between 9 January 1945 and 15 August 1945, after the conclusion of Operation KING, which was obligated by U.S. General Douglas MacArthur’s insistence that he liberate the entire archipelago. MIKE consisted of seven proposed landings and other operations. Each plan was numbered, but they were executed out of sequence. Operation MIKE was followed by Operation VICTOR.

== Operations ==
MIKE I was the major American landing on Luzon. On 9 January 1945, the United States I Corps and XIV Corps performed an amphibious landing at Lingayen Gulf, halfway up the west coast of the island. The Japanese responded with a Kamikaze attack that failed. The operation was concluded with no major contact between the ground forces.

MIKE II was a plan for an amphibious landing along the east coast of Luzon early in 1945. It was never executed.

MIKE III was a plan for an amphibious assault originally scheduled for Batangas, located southwest of Luzon. This plan was modified by moving the goal to Vigan, but ultimately it was never executed.

MIKE IV was a second plan for an amphibious assault on the west coast of Luzon in early 1945. It was never executed.

MIKE V was the plan for consolidating all operations on the island of Luzon. This included the exceptionally brutal Battle of Manila, which was the largest land battle in the Pacific.

MIKE VI was the amphibious assault on Luzon at Nasugbu Bay on 31 January 1945. Most of the 11th Airborne Division landed just south of Manila, while the 511th Parachute Infantry Regiment jumped in behind the beach.

MIKE VII was the landing of the United States XI Corps at San Antonio on the west coast of Luzon on 29 January 1945. Subic Bay Naval Base was captured almost immediately, but strong Japanese resistance was met farther inland at Zig Zag Pass. Tactical air was used to break through the Japanese defenses on 7 February 1945, and the forces moved on towards Manila.
