= HMS Kempthorne =

Frigate of the Royal Navy

- HMS Kempthorne as seen from the damaged HMS Nabob

History

United States
- Name: USS Trumpeter
- Ordered: 18 January 1942
- Builder: Boston Navy Yard
- Laid down: 5 June 1943
- Launched: 17 July 1943
- Commissioned: 20 August 1945
- Decommissioned: 17 October 1945
- Fate: Sold May 1946 broken up for scrap

United Kingdom
- Name: HMS Kempthorne
- Namesake: John Kempthorne
- Commissioned: 31 October 1943
- Decommissioned: 20 August 1945
- Honours and awards: Atlantic 1944-45
- Fate: Returned to the US Navy

General characteristics
- Class & type: Captain-class frigate
- Displacement: 1,140 long tons (1,158 t)
- Length: 289.5 ft (88.2 m)
- Beam: 35 ft (11 m)
- Draught: 9 ft (2.7 m)
- Propulsion: Four General Motors 278A 16-cylinder engines; GE 7,040 bhp (5,250 kW) generators (4,800 kW); GE electric motors for 6,000 shp (4,500 kW); Two shafts
- Speed: 20 knots (37 km/h)
- Range: 5,000 nautical miles (9,260 km) at 15 knots (28 km/h)
- Complement: 156
- Sensors & processing systems: SA & SL type radars; Type 144 series Asdic; MF Direction Finding antenna; HF Direction Finding Type FH 4 antenna
- Armament: 3 × 3 in (76 mm)/50 Mk.22 guns; 1 × twin Bofors 40 mm mount Mk.I; 7–16 × 20 mm Oerlikon guns; Mark 10 Hedgehog antisubmarine mortar; Depth charges; QF 2-pounder naval gun

HMS Kempthorne (K483) was a Captain-class frigate of the Royal Navy and named after Captain (later Admiral Sir) John Kempthorne of HMS Mary Rose in 1669.

== Construction and commissioning ==
Kempthorne was ordered from the Boston Navy Yard on 18 January 1942 as the Evarts-class destroyer escort Trumpeter (DE-279). She was not commissioned into the US Navy but was instead transferred to the Royal Navy under the Lend-Lease agreement and commissioned on 31 October 1943.

== Royal Navy service ==
=== Initial training and refitting ===
After commissioning, Kempthorne carried out training exercises in the Boston area in November before taking passage to Bermuda. Throughout December she carried out further exercises and shore training, after which she sailed to Halifax, Nova Scotia to join convoy HX 274 bound for the UK. Also sailing to the UK as part of this convoy were her sister corvettes HMS Goodson, HMS Bligh and HMS Keats, which had also been at Bermuda taking part in exercises. They sailed on 6 January as members of the convoy rather than as escorts as they lacked the necessary equipment and were not properly trained. On arrival in British waters on 21 January they were detached and sailed to Belfast.

Here they underwent a refit to replace unsatisfactory US Navy equipment. The ships were fitted with an Admiralty design gyro compass and depth charge arrangements, as well as receiving the latest sonar systems and a Royal Navy design radio direction finding outfit. The refit lasted until late February, and on its completion on 28 February Kempthorne was nominated to deploy with the 5th Escort Group in the Western Approaches Command. Further sea trials were carried out in March, followed by a period of work-up at Tobermory. She then joined the Group at Belfast in April, serving alongside her sisters HMS Aylmer, Bickerton, Bligh, Grindall, Keats, Tyler and Goodson. The senior officer of the group was Commander Donald MacIntyre, who had already achieved renown as the commander of the 2nd Escort Group.

=== Deployed in the Atlantic ===
Kempthorne first deployed with the group on 21 April, helping to escort the westbound convoy ONS 233 in appalling weather. They were then detached from the convoy on 26 April to join the aircraft carrier HMS Vindex and the ships of the 9th Escort Group deploying to defend convoys under threat of attack from German U-boats. They made contact with Vindex and the group on 2 May. They refuelled from Vindex, whilst the ships of the 9th Group returned to Canada to refuel. Kempthorne, Goodson and Keats were then deployed as a close escort for Vindex. They remained with Vindex for several days and on 6 May the German submarine U-765 was detected by HMS Bickerton. Fairey Swordfish of 825 Naval Air Squadron were scrambled from Vindex whilst Bligh, Bickerton and Aylmer carried out depth charge attacks. These attacks brought U-765 to the surface where she was engaged by surface gunfire from the attacking ships. A Swordfish then dropped two depth charges which sank U-765. Further refuelling of the escorts was carried out on 9 May and the ships returned to the Clyde with Vindex on 14 May.

=== South Western Approaches ===
They then sailed to Belfast, where the group was nominated to support Operation Neptune, the Normandy landings. The group was then deployed at Moelfre Bay in the Clyde area by 28 May. In early June the group moved to the South Western Approaches to intercept U-boats which might be attempting to enter the English Channel to interfere with the landings. During this time the group remained under the command of CinC Home Fleet and was not attached to the Naval Commander Expeditionary Force. Whilst Kempthorne was patrolling off The Lizard with the River-class frigate HMS Mourne on 15 June, they came under attack from U-767, which torpedoed and sank Mourne. Kempthorne survived and on 26 June was present at the sinking of U-269 by HMS Bickerton. Bickerton was then dispatched to Plymouth with the survivors of U-269, with HMS Goodson became the Senior Officer's ship. Later that day the group was attacked by U-984 and Goodson was seriously damaged by a torpedo hit. She was towed into port by HMS Bligh, but was found to be beyond economical repair.

=== Attempted attack on the Tirpitz ===
Kempthorne and the group were released from their duties in the South West Approaches in July and returned to Belfast, where they were nominated for Home Fleet screening duties. After a period spent undergoing essential repairs and repainting, the group sailed to Scapa Flow on 12 August. On 18 August they were deployed as a screen for the escort carriers HMS Nabob and HMS Trumpeter for the planned air attacks on the German battleship Tirpitz, lying at anchor in Altenfjord, Norway. This was designated Operation Goodwood. Adverse weather hampered operations however and the attempt was aborted on 20 August. Whilst waiting in the area for an improvement in the weather, Nabob and Bickerton were attacked by U-354. Nabob was hit, but was able to return to Scapa Flow under her own steam. Bickerton was also critically damaged. Kempthorne took off casualties and non-essential personnel, but it was later decided to scuttle Bickerton and she was sunk three hours after being hit. The ships returned to the Clyde on 30 August and Commander MacIntyre was relieved by Commander BW Taylor.

The group then returned to defending the Atlantic convoys with the Western Approaches Command in September. In October they were deployed to escort a military convoy from the UK to Naples and on their return in December they were deployed in the North Western Approaches to intercept U-boats that had been forced by the advancing Allied armies to sail from the North German and Norwegian submarine bases to reach the Atlantic convoy routes.

=== Irish Sea ===
In 1945 Kempthorne deployed with the group in the Irish Sea and the South Western Approaches. On 26 January the group was deployed to come to the assistance of the 4th Escort Group which was attacking U-1172. Both groups then launched surface attacks, before HMS Aylmer rammed and sank the submarine. They then began to search for another submarine known to be in the area, and posing a threat to the inbound convoy HX 332 as it passed through the Irish Sea bound for Liverpool. The submarine, U-1051 was detected on 27 January by HMS Keats and then sunk by HMS Bligh, Keats and Tyler. Kempthorne remained deployed with the group in the North Western Approaches throughout February and March 1945, followed by a period off the west of Ireland and the north west of Scotland in April. In May 1945, she was one of two British warships which presided over the surrender of the German U-boats at Trondheim, Norway. She was then nominated to be returned early to the US and was paid off by June.

== Decommissioning and scrapping ==
Kempthorne was returned to the custody of the United States on 20 August 1945 and was commissioned in the United States Navy the same day for the voyage home. She arrived at Philadelphia on 8 September 1945 and was decommissioned at the navy yard there on 17 October. She was struck from the U.S. Navy list on 1 November 1945 and scrapped by 28 May 1946.
