= Grindall =

Grindall may refer to:

- Richard Grindall (1750–1820), British admiral
- Grindall Island, an island in Alaska in the United States
- HMS Grindall (K477), a British frigate in commission in the Royal Navy from 1943 to 1945
- USS Grindall (DE-273), a United States Navy destroyer escort in commission from August to October 1945 which previously had served in the Royal Navy as HMS Grindall (K477)

See also

- William Grindal ( ? - 1548), English scholar
