= Eisele =

Eisele is a German surname. Notable people with the surname include:

- Alois Eisele (1914–2008), German Wehrmacht officer
- Carolyn Eisele (1902–2000), American mathematician
- Donn F. Eisele (1930–1987), American astronaut
- Garnett Thomas Eisele (1923–2017), American judge
- George Raymond Eisele (1923–1942), United States Naval Reserve sailor
- Hans Eisele (disambiguation), multiple people
- John Eisele (1884–1933), American middle-distance runner
- Joseph Eisele (1834–1868), German serial killer

== See also ==
- USS Eisele
