= K261 =

K261 or K-261 may refer to:

- K-261 (Kansas highway), a state highway in Kansas
- HMS Mourne (K261), a former UK Royal Navy ship
- K.261 Adagio in E for Violin and Orchestra (Mozart) (1776)
