= Isley =

Isley is an English surname. The name can also be used as an anglicized variant for the German surnames Eisele and Eisler. Notable people with the surname include:

- The Isley Brothers, American musical group
  - Ernie Isley (born 1952), American musician and member of The Isley Brothers
  - Marvin Isley (1953–2010), American musician and member of The Isley Brothers
  - O'Kelly Isley, Jr. (1937–1986), American musician and member of The Isley Brothers
  - Ronald Isley (born 1941), American musician and member of The Isley Brothers
  - Rudolph Isley (1939–2023), American musician and member of The Isley Brothers
  - Vernon Isley (1942–1955), American musician and member of The Isley Brothers
- Albert Isley (1871–1953), American judge, lawyer, and politician
- Alexander Isley (born 1961), American graphic designer
- Ernie Isley (politician) (born 1937), Canadian politician
- Henry Isley (16th century), English nobleman
- Troy Isley (born 1998), American boxer

== Isely ==
- Duane Isely (1918–2000), American botanist

== See also ==
- Pamela Isley, a DC Comics supervillain better known as Poison Ivy
