= USS Eisele =

Two ships of United States Navy were named USS Eisele:

- USS Eisele (DE-34), an Evarts-class destroyer escort
- USS Eisele (DE-75), a Buckley-class destroyer escort
