= Tisdall =

Tisdall is a surname. Notable people with the surname include:

- Arthur Tisdall (1890–1915), British recipient of the Victoria Cross
- Bob Tisdall (1907–2004), Irish Olympic athlete
- Charles Edward Tisdall (1866–1936), Canadian mayor of Vancouver
- E.E.P. Tisdall (born 1907), British biographer
- Frederick Tisdall (1893–1949), Canadian pediatrician
- Jonathan Tisdall (born 1958), chess grandmaster
- Margaret Tisdall (1905–1979), Irish singer and pianist known by stage name Peggy Dell
- Sarah Tisdall (born 1960), British Foreign Office clerk jailed for leaking documents
- Simon Tisdall (born 1953) British journalist
- William Tisdale (born c. 1570), also spelled Tisdall, English musician and composer
- William St. Clair Tisdall (1859–1928), British historian and philologist

== See also ==
- Tisdale (disambiguation)
