= Tisdale =

Tisdale may refer to:

== People ==
- Ashley Tisdale (born 1985), American actress and singer
- David Tisdale (1835–1911), Canadian politician
- Elkanah Tisdale (1768–1835), American engraver, miniature painter and cartoonist
- Henry N. Tisdale (born 1944), American academic administrator, educator, and mathematician
- Jennifer Tisdale (born 1981), American former actress, model and older sister of Ashley Tisdale
- Mahlon Tisdale (1890–1972), a United States Navy admiral during World War II
- Margaret Tisdale (died 2015), British virologist
- Paul Tisdale (born 1973), British football manager
- Ryland Dillard Tisdale (1894–1942), a United States Navy Commander during both World Wars
- Wayman Tisdale (1964–2009), American basketball player and jazz bass guitarist

== Places ==
=== Canada ===
- Rural Municipality of Tisdale No. 427, Saskatchewan
  - Tisdale, Saskatchewan
    - Tisdale Airport

=== United States ===
- Tisdale, Kansas
- Tisdale Township, Cowley County, Kansas
- Wesley D. Tisdale Elementary School, Ramsey, New Jersey

== Vessels ==
- USS Tisdale, the name of more than one United States Navy ship
- USS Mahlon S. Tisdale (FFG-27), a United States Navy guided-missile frigate in commission from 1982 to 1996

== See also ==
- Tisdall, a surname
- Tisdel, a surname
