= USS Tisdale (DE-33) =

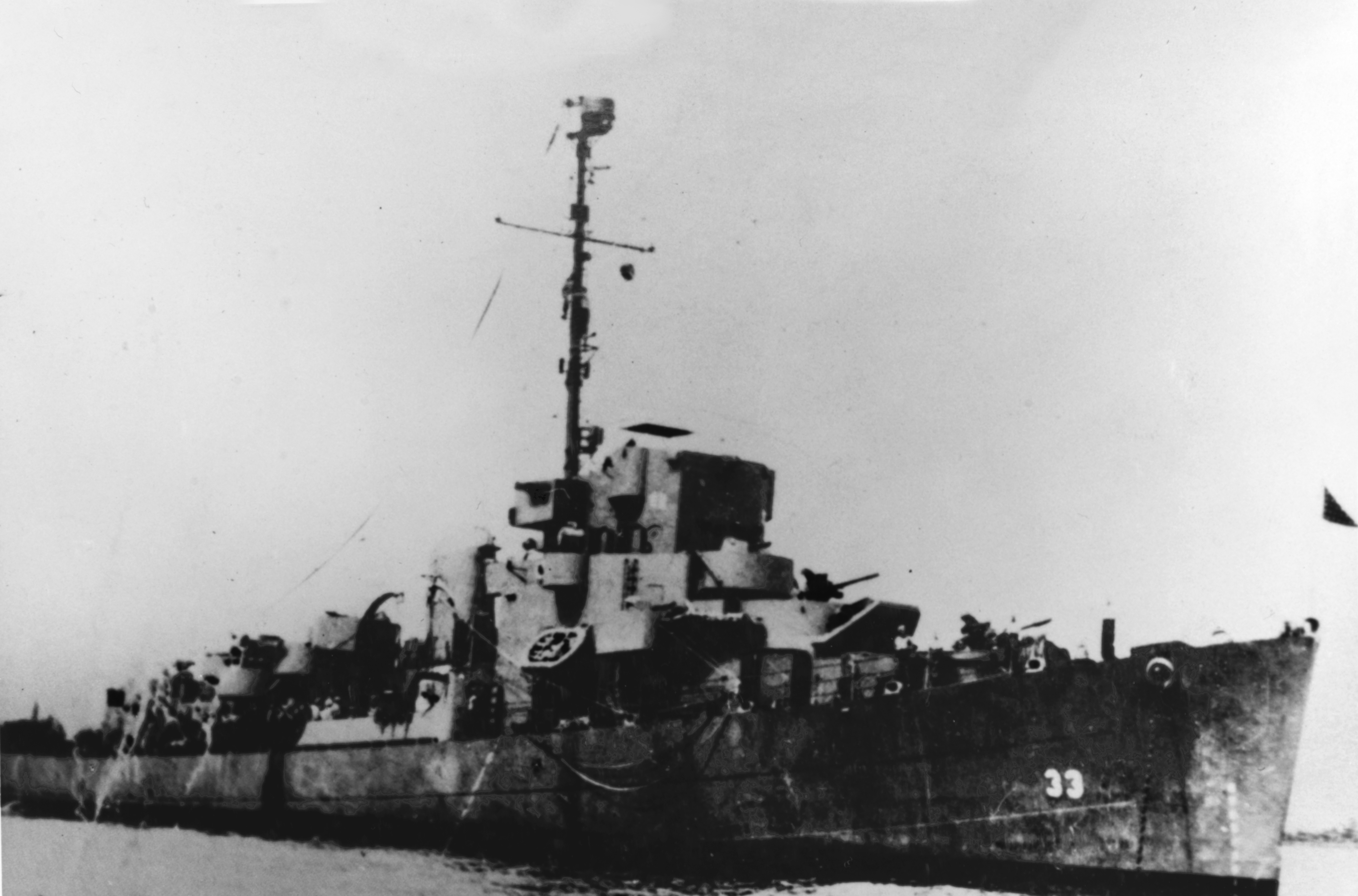
- Tisdale c. August 1945

History

United States
- Name: USS Tisdale
- Namesake: Ryland Dillard Tisdale
- Builder: Mare Island Navy Yard
- Laid down: 23 January 1943
- Launched: 28 June 1943
- Commissioned: 11 October 1943
- Decommissioned: 12 October 1945
- Stricken: 28 November 1945
- Honors and awards: 4 battle stars (World War II)
- Fate: Sold for scrapping, 2 February 1948

General characteristics
- Type: Evarts-class destroyer escort
- Displacement: 1,140 long tons (1,158 t) standard; 1,430 long tons (1,453 t) full
- Length: 289 ft 5 in (88.21 m) o/a; 283 ft 6 in (86.41 m) w/l
- Beam: 35 ft (11 m)
- Draft: 11 ft (3.4 m) (max)
- Propulsion: 4 × General Motors Model 16-278A diesel engines with electric drive, 6,000 shp (4,474 kW); 2 screws
- Speed: 19 knots (35 km/h; 22 mph)
- Range: 4,150 nmi (7,690 km)
- Complement: 15 officers and 183 enlisted
- Armament: 3 × single 3"/50 Mk.22 dual purpose guns; 1 × quad 1.1"/75 Mk.2 AA gun; 9 × 20 mm Mk.4 AA guns; 1 × Hedgehog Projector Mk.10 (144 rounds); 8 × Mk.6 depth charge projectors; 2 × Mk.9 depth charge tracks

The second USS Tisdale (DE-33) was an Evarts-class destroyer escort of the United States Navy during World War II. She was promptly sent off into the Pacific Ocean to protect convoys and other ships from Japanese submarines and fighter aircraft. She performed dangerous work in numerous battle areas, and was awarded four battle stars.

== Design ==
The Evarts-class destroyer escorts were 289 ft 5 in (88.21 m) long overall, and they had a beam of 35 ft 2 in (10.72 m). They had an average draft of 10 ft 1 in (3.07 m) at their full load displacement of 1,416 long tons (1,439 t). Each ship had a normal crew numbered 156 officers and sailors.

Tisdale was propelled by a pair of diesel motors manufactured by General Motors, which drove a pair of screw propellers. Her propulsion system was rated to produce 6,000 brake horsepower (4,500 kW) for a top speed of 19.5 knots (36.1 km/h; 22.4 mph). Oil storage amounted to between 131 and 197 long tons (133 and 200 t), which allowed a cruising radius of up to 6,000 nautical miles (11,000 km; 6,900 mi) at an economical pace of 10 knots (19 km/h; 12 mph).

The ship's armament consisted of a main battery of three 3-inch (76 mm) /50-caliber guns in individual pivot mounts, which could be used against air or surface targets. These were supported by a light anti-aircraft battery that initially consisted of four 1.1 in (28 mm) /75-caliber guns in a quadruple mount and nine 20 mm (0.79 in) Oerlikon guns. For attacks against submarines, the ship was equipped with a Hedgehog mortar, eight depth charge throwers, and two depth charge racks.

== Service history ==
BDE-33 was laid down at Mare Island Navy Yard on 23 January 1943 as one of the warships to be transferred to the United Kingdom under the terms of the Lend-Lease agreement. However, her allocation to the Royal Navy was canceled; and she was named Tisdale (for Commander Ryland Dillard Tisdale) and redesignated DE-33 on 23 June 1943 when a destroyer escort recently laid down at Boston, Massachusetts, DE-228, was assigned to the Royal Navy in her stead. Tisdale was launched on 28 June 1943; sponsored by Mrs. Elizabeth M. Tisdale, Jr.; and commissioned on 11 October 1943.

Following shakedown, Tisdale cleared Treasure Island, San Francisco, on 5 December 1943. Six days later, she moored at Pearl Harbor in the Hawaiian Islands. The destroyer escort conducted training in the vicinity of Oahu until the 23rd, when she got underway for the Central Pacific. After stops at Canton Island and Abemama, she reached Tarawa Atoll, in the Gilbert Islands, on 9 January 1944. Between 16 and 20 January, she made two voyages between Tarawa and Funafuti in the Ellice Islands, ending up at Funafuti on the 20th. On the 23rd, Tisdale stood out of Funafuti to participate in "Operation Flintlock", the seizure and occupation of Kwajalein and Majuro Atolls in the Marshall Islands. However, the destroyer escort saw no action in the operation and only put into Majuro after it had been secured.

The destroyer escort moored at the dock in Pearl Harbor at mid-morning on 13 February. She underwent repairs until the first week in March. On 3 March, she cleared the harbor to return to the Marshalls. After a stop at Johnston Island, she moored at Majuro just after noon on the 12th. Three days later, Tisdale exited the lagoon in the screen of a convoy bound for the Gilberts. She arrived at Tarawa on St. Patrick's Day and remained there for almost two months screening ships into and out of the atoll. On 12 May, she exited the lagoon in company with Fleming (DE-32) and Eisele (DE-34) and set course for Pearl Harbor, where she arrived on the 19th.

=== Marianas campaign ===
Following a 10-day availability at the DE docks, she got underway on 29 May in the screen of Rear Admiral Blandy's floating reserve for the Marianas invasion. Tisdale and her charges staged through Kwajalein, stopping there from 9 to 11 June before continuing on to the Marianas. Soldiers and marines stormed ashore at Saipan on the 15th. The destroyer escort, however, remained some distance from the island, continuing to screen the reserve force. On 16 June, Admiral Spruance decided to commit the floating reserve, and the Army's 27th Infantry Division landed at dusk. Tisdale escorted the ships into position off Saipan for the landings and began duty screening the transport area.

During the Battle of the Philippine Sea, the warship covered the transports against the possibility of an enemy end run and the contingency of Japanese planes penetrating Task Force 58's reinforced anti-aircraft screen. Neither eventuality materialized, and Tisdale saw no action until 24 June when she accompanied Colorado (BB-45) on a bombardment of Saipan. Later that day, she joined Stringham (APD-6) in the channel between Tinian and Saipan where they fired shells to illuminate that stretch of water to interdict Japanese attempts to reinforce the Saipan garrison. The following morning, she returned to the transport area and resumed her duties in the anti-submarine screen. On 2 July, she began screening ships on their nightly retirements from Saipan. Six days later, Tisdale went into action against the next objective in the Marianas, Tinian, by delivering night harassing fire and illuminating fire in the area around Tinian Town and Sunharon Harbor.

On the 12th, she cleared the Marianas and escorted a convoy to Eniwetok until the 21st, when she headed back to the Marianas. The destroyer escort arrived off Saipan on 25 July and resumed her familiar duty screening transports during the campaign on Tinian. On 16 August, just before the assault on Guam, she departed the Marianas once more. Steaming via Eniwetok, she reached Pearl Harbor on 27 August and began a 20-day availability. She conducted trials and training exercises in the Hawaiian Islands until October.

=== Convoy operations and Okinawa ===
Tisdale departed Oahu in the screen of a convoy on 2 October and arrived in Eniwetok lagoon on the 13th. From then until late February 1945, she escorted convoys. This duty took her back and forth, between Eniwetok and Ulithi. The single exception was a round-trip voyage to Manus in late January and early February. During the return voyage, she attacked a sonar contact on 3 February and, although she received no official credit for it, she probably sank a Japanese submarine. On 25 February, Tisdale exited the lagoon at Eniwetok in company with Thetis Bay (CVE-90). The task unit reached Apra Harbor, Guam, on the 28th, and she conducted operations with the escort carrier well into the first week in March. On 5 March, the two warships headed back to Eniwetok, entering the lagoon on the 8th. Three days later, she headed out of the Eniwetok anchorage with a Ulithi-bound convoy. She made her destination on 16 March and, five days later, headed for the Ryukyu Islands with the escort carriers of Support Carrier Unit 2.

On 25 March, the warships arrived in their area of operations to the south of Okinawa, the objective in "Operation Iceberg". The carriers launched their planes to support the invasion of Okinawa, and Tisdale helped protect them from enemy submarine and air attacks. Though enemy planes occasionally approached the task unit, Tisdale saw no real air action because the combat air patrol either splashed them or chased them away. On the 31st, she was transferred to the screen of Support Carrier Group 1; but her duties remained as before. On 17 April, the warship closed the Hagushi beaches at Okinawa for the first time; then retired to screen refueling operations. On 20 April, she did her first duty as a radar picket ship. That same day, Tisdale departed the Ryukyus to screen West Virginia (BB-48), Portland (CA-33), and Biloxi (CL-80) to Ulithi. After five days at Ulithi, she departed the atoll on 29 April. She escorted a convoy to Okinawa and arrived off the Hagushi beaches once more on 3 May. For the next month, she stood radar picket duty at various stations around the island, occasionally putting into the anchorage at Kerama Retto for mail, provisions, and other supplies.

On 14 June, Tisdale departed Okinawa and headed for Leyte in the Philippines. After some repairs, she cleared Leyte on 30 June and steamed, via Eniwetok and Pearl Harbor, back to the United States. She arrived in San Francisco, California, on 1 August and, four days later, moved north to Portland, Oregon. The Japanese agreed to capitulate on 15 August, and Tisdale began decommissioning procedures soon thereafter. She was decommissioned on 17 November 1945, and her name was struck from the Navy List on 28 November 1945. She was sold to A. G. Schoonmaker Co., Inc., of New York City on 2 February 1948 and scrapped the following month.

== Awards ==
- Combat Action Ribbon (retroactive)
- American Campaign Medal
- Asiatic-Pacific Campaign Medal (with four service stars)
- World War II Victory Medal
