= Tisdel =

Tisdel is a surname. Notable people with the surname include:

- Jeff Tisdel (born 1956), American football coach
- Mark Tisdel (born 1955), American politician

== See also ==
- Tisdale (disambiguation)
