= Second-rate =

Historic category for Royal Navy ships

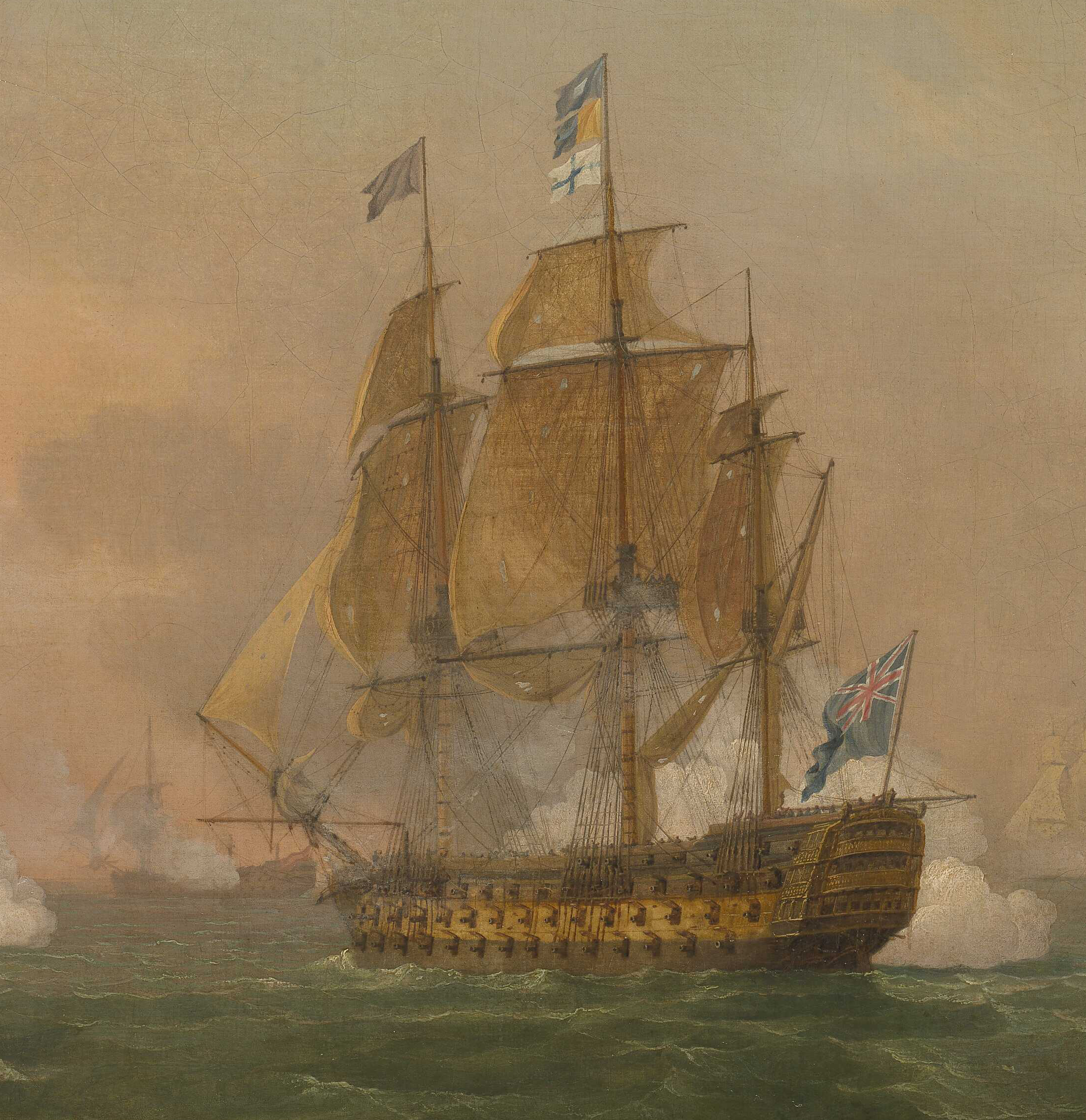
The second-rate HMS Prince of Wales

In the rating system of the Royal Navy used to categorise sailing warships, a second-rate was a ship of the line which by the start of the 18th century mounted 90 to 98 guns on three gun decks; earlier 17th-century second-rates had fewer guns and were originally two-deckers or had only partially armed third gun decks. A "second-rate" was the second largest class of warships in a hierarchical system of six "ratings" based on size and firepower.

They were essentially smaller and hence cheaper versions of the 100-gun first-rates. Like the first rates, they fought in the line of battle, but unlike the first rates, which were considered too valuable to risk in distant stations, the second-rates often served also in major overseas stations as flagships. They had a reputation for poor handling and slow sailing. They were popular as flagships of admirals commanding the Windward and/or Leeward Islands station, which was usually a Rear-admiral of the red.

== Rating ==
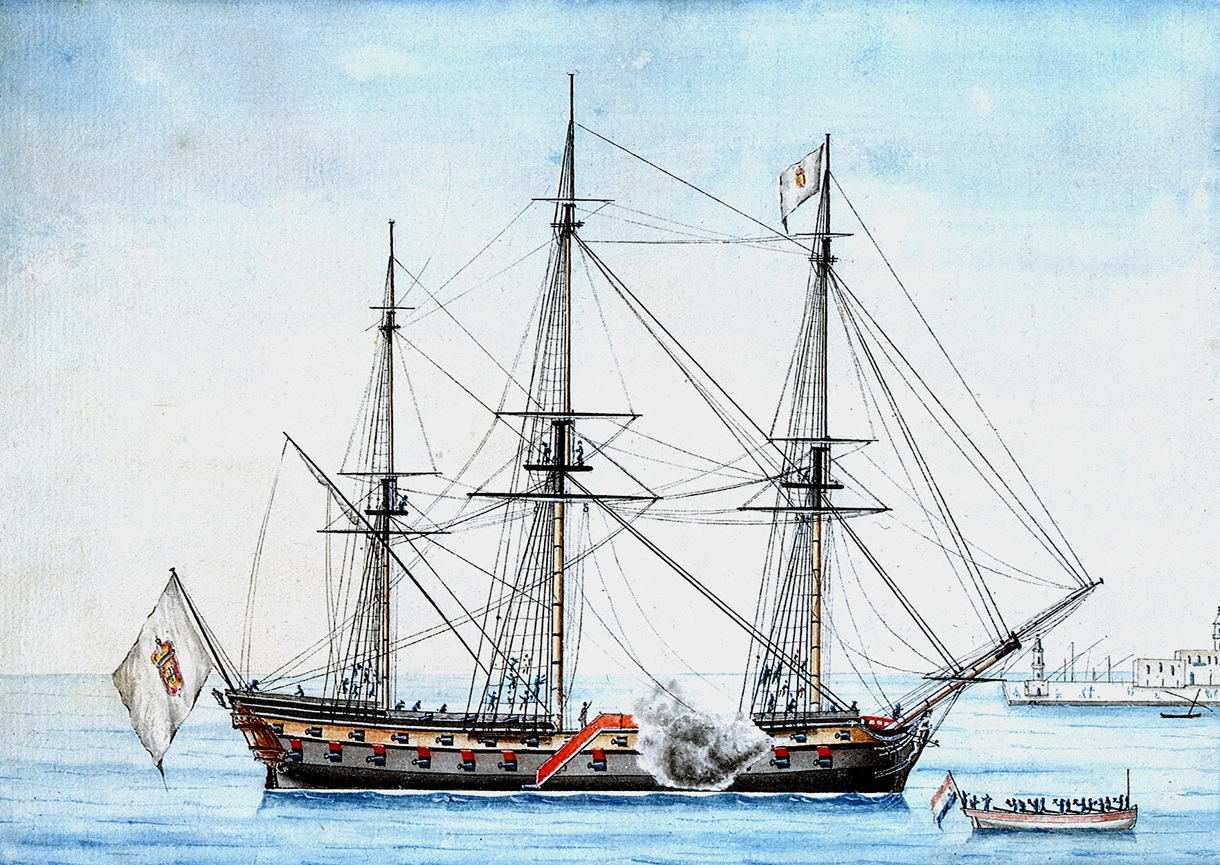
1780 illustration of a Portuguese Navy second-rate

Typically measuring around 2000 tons burthen and carrying a crew of 750, the second-rates by the second half of the 18th century carried 32-pounder guns on the gun deck, with 18-pounders instead of 24-pounders on the middle deck, and 12-pounders on the upper deck (rather than 18- or 24-pounders on first rates), although there were exceptions to this. Both first and second-rates carried lighter guns (and, after 1780, carronades) on their forecastles and quarterdecks.

=== Three-decker v two-decker ===
The three-decker second-rate was mainly a British type, and was not built by other European navies to any great degree. As speed is mainly determined by length along the waterline, the three-deck second-rate was a slow sailer compared to both its two-deck equivalent and the first-rate ships Being the same height as a first-rate but shorter meant they handled poorly and had a tendency to sail to leeward; HMS Prince was described by one of her lieutenants as sailing "like a haystack". Their poor sailing abilities prompted Nelson, at Trafalgar, to order Prince and HMS Dreadnought to approach the enemy at a lesser angle than the remainder of the column, in the hope that having more sail area exposed to the wind would enable these two ships to keep up. A near disastrous example of the three-decker's maladroitness occurred on 25 December 1796 when, on sighting the enemy, the Channel Fleet attempted a hurried departure from Spithead: Four second-rates collided with one another while another ran aground.

Apart from its unhandiness, in terms of sheer firepower it was matched or even out-gunned by many of the large 80-gun and 74-gun two-deckers used by the French and Spanish navies. The additional height did, however, give the second-rate an advantage in close combat with the further advantage of it being able to withstand punishment like a larger ship, but being much cheaper to build and maintain. It was sometimes mistaken by the enemy for a first-rate, which could possibly make enemy commanders reluctant to press an attack.

After the Napoleonic wars, new second-rates in the Royal Navy mounted their guns (typically 90 or 91) on two decks once more, leaving the first rates as the only ships with three complete gun decks.

== Term ==
The term "second-rate" has since passed into general usage as an adjective used to mean of suboptimal quality, inferior to something that is "first-rate".

== Bibliography ==
- Bennett, Geoffrey (2004). The Battle of Trafalgar. ISBN 1-84415-107-7.
- Gardiner, Robert, ed. (1992). The Line of Battle: The Sailing Warship, 1650–1840. Conway's History of the Ship. Naval Institute Press. ISBN 1-55750-501-2.
- Gardiner, Robert (2004). Warships of the Napoleonic Era: Design, Development and Deployment. Seaforth Publishing. ISBN 978-1-84832-108-3.
- Rodger, N. A. M. (2004). The Command of the Ocean, a Naval History of Britain 1649–1815. ISBN 0-7139-9411-8.
- Winfield, Rif (2009). British Warships in the Age of Sail: 1603–1714: Design, Construction, Careers and Fates. Seaforth Publishing. ISBN 978-1-84832-040-6.
- Winfield, Rif (2007). British Warships in the Age of Sail 1714–1792: Design, Construction, Careers and Fates. Seaforth Publishing. ISBN 978-1-84415-700-6.
- Winfield, Rif (2008). British Warships in the Age of Sail 1793–1817: Design, Construction, Careers and Fates (2nd, revised ed.). Seaforth. ISBN 978-1-84415-717-4.
- Winfield, Rif (2014). British Warships in the Age of Sail 1817–1863: Design, Construction, Careers and Fates. Seaforth Publishing. ISBN 978-1-84832-169-4.
