= HMS Bickerton =

Frigate of the Royal Navy

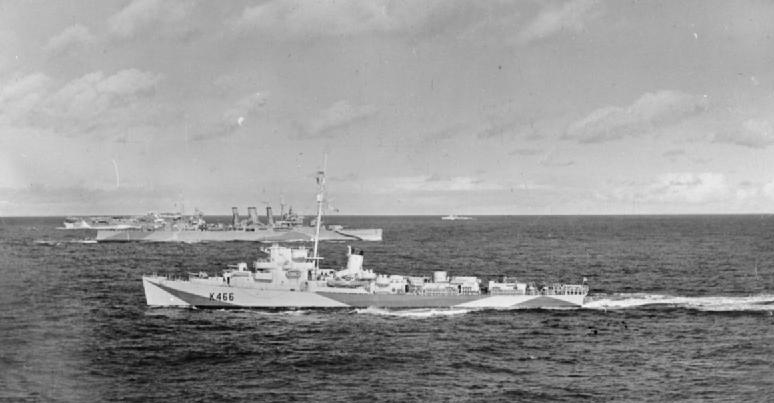
- HMS Bickerton in the foreground, with Kent and Trumpeter.

History

United States
- Name: Eisele
- Builder: Bethlehem-Hingham Shipyard Inc., Hingham, Massachusetts
- Laid down: 3 May 1943
- Identification: DE-75
- Fate: Transferred to Royal Navy

United Kingdom
- Name: Bickerton
- Namesake: Sir Richard Bickerton
- Launched: 26 July 1943
- Commissioned: 17 October 1943
- Identification: Pennant number K466
- Fate: Torpedoed and sunk 22 August 1944

General characteristics
- Class & type: Captain-class frigate
- Displacement: 1,800 long tons (1,829 t) (fully loaded)
- Length: 306 ft (93 m) (overall)
- Beam: 36 ft 6 in (11.13 m)
- Draught: 11 ft (3.4 m) (fully loaded)
- Speed: 24 knots (44 km/h; 28 mph)
- Range: 5,500 nmi (10,200 km; 6,300 mi) at 15 knots (28 km/h; 17 mph)
- Complement: Typically between 170–180

HMS Bickerton was a Captain-class frigate of the Royal Navy. She served during the World War II as a convoy escort and anti-submarine warfare vessel in the Battle of the Atlantic and was an effective U-boat killer, being credited with the destruction of two U-boats during a service career of just 10 months. Bickerton was lost in action on 22 August 1944.

== Name ==
Originally this ship was provisionally given the name USS Eisele (this name was reassigned to DE-34). However the delivery was diverted to the Royal Navy before launch, and she was renamed for Sir Richard Bickerton commander of HMS Terrible at the First Battle of Ushant during the American Revolutionary War.

== Construction ==
Bickerton was ordered on 10 January 1942, as DE-75, a long-hulled turbo-diesel (TE) type destroyer escort, one of more than 500 such vessels built for ASW to a collaborative British-American design. She was laid down on 3 May 1943, by the Bethlehem Hingham Shipyard in Hingham, Massachusetts. She was launched on 24 July and completed 17 October, in the remarkably (but not unusually) short build time of 5 months 14 days (Note: The similar-sized River-class frigates had a typical build time of over 12 months.)

== Service career ==
On commissioning and working up Bickerton sailed for Britain, where she was modified to meet Royal Navy requirements. In March 1944 she was allocated to Western Approaches Command as senior ship of 5th Escort Group under her new captain, Cdr. D MacIntyre

In April 5EG joined ON 233 as support group, but was detached to hunt for a U-boat on weather-reporting duty. On 6 May 1944, the German submarine U-765 was found and sunk in the North Atlantic by depth charges from Bickerton, operating alongside two Fairey Swordfish (No. 825 Squadron) of the escort carrier Vindex and frigates Bligh and Aylmer. Of the crew of U-765, 37 died and 11 survived. A further search for the U-boat sent as U-765's relief was unsuccessful.

In June Bickerton and 5EG were deployed in the English Channel as part of Operation Neptune, the naval component of the Normandy landings. Their task was to guard against interference by U-boats from the Biscay ports. On 15 June the group was in an unsuccessful action against a U-boat, during which the frigate Mourne was sunk. (The U-boat, U-767, was caught three days later and destroyed by 14 EG.)

Ten days later on 25 June, off Start Point, Bickerton and 5 EG found and sank U-269 . Of the crew of U-269, 13 died and 39 survived.

== Fate ==
in August 1944 Bickerton and 5EG were escorting the escort carriers (Trumpeter and Nabob) from the Home Fleet (under Admiral Moore), which covered the convoy JW 59 and launched further attacks (Operation Goodwood) on the German battleship Tirpitz in Altenfjord. Before the group was able to launch an attack on Tirpitz, U-354 encountered them on her search for the convoy northwest of the North Cape in the Barents Sea. At about 01:00 on 22 August, at position 71°42′N 19°11′E, U-354 badly damaged Nabob with a pattern-running FAT torpedo spread. The U-boat then tried to sink her at 01:22 with a GNAT homing torpedo, which struck Bickerton. She was subsequently scuttled by a torpedo from Vigilant, to focus the recovery effort on Nabob. Two days later U-354 was herself sunk attacking convoy JW 59.

== Battle honours ==
Bickerton earned the following battle honours for service:

- Atlantic 1944
- English Channel 1944
- Normandy 1944
- Arctic 1944

== Successes ==
During her service Bickerton was credited with the destruction of two U-boats.

Date	U-boat	Type	Location	Notes
6 May 1944	U-765	VIIC	North Atlantic; 52°30′N 28°28′W	Sighted by Swordfish X/825 from Vindex; depth-charged, shelled by Bickerton, Aylmer, Bligh, Keats.
25 June 1944	U-269	VIIC	English Channel; 50°01′N 02°59′W	depth-charged by Bickerton south-east of Start Point.

== Bibliography ==
- Blair, Clay (1998). Hitler's U-Boat War: The Hunted 1942-1945. Cassell. ISBN 0-304-35261-6.
- Collingwood, Donald (1998). The Captain Class Frigates in the Second World War. Leo Cooper. ISBN 0-85052-615-9.
- Elliott, Peter (1977). Allied Escort Ships of World War II: A complete survey. London: Macdonald and Jane's. ISBN 0-356-08401-9.
- Franklin, Bruce Hampton (1999). The Buckley-Class Destroyer Escorts. Chatham Publishing. ISBN 1-86176-118-X.
- Kemp, Paul (1997). U-Boats Destroyed, German submarine losses in the World Wars. Arms and Armour. ISBN 1-85409-515-3.
- Niestle, Axel (1998). German U-Boat Losses During World War II. United States Naval Institute. ISBN 1-55750-641-8.
