= Hans Eisele =

Hans Eisele may refer to:

- Hans Eisele (physician), Nazi doctor and convicted war criminal
- Hans Eisele (footballer), German football (soccer) player
