= HMS Mourne =

River-class frigate of the Royal Navy

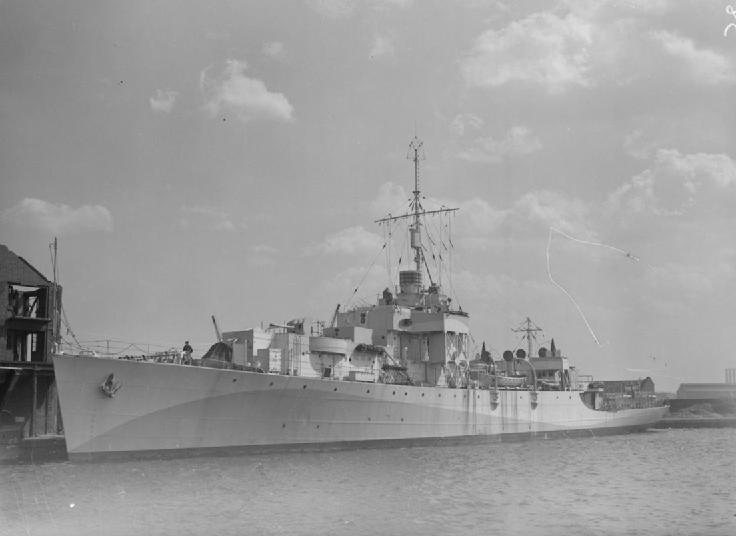
- HMS Mourne in 1943

History

United Kingdom
- Name: Mourne
- Namesake: River Mourne
- Builder: Smiths Dock Co., South Bank-on-Tees
- Laid down: 21 March 1942
- Launched: 24 September 1942
- Commissioned: 30 April 1943
- Fate: Torpedoed and sunk, 15 June 1944 at 49°35′N 5°30′W

General characteristics
- Class & type: River-class frigate
- Displacement: 1,370 long tons (1,390 t); 1,830 long tons (1,860 t) (deep load)
- Length: 283 ft (86.26 m) p/p; 301.25 ft (91.82 m)o/a
- Beam: 36.5 ft (11.13 m)
- Draught: 9 ft (2.74 m); 13 ft (3.96 m) (deep load)
- Propulsion: 2 × Admiralty 3-drum boilers, 2 shafts, reciprocating vertical triple expansion, 5,500 ihp (4,100 kW)
- Speed: 20 knots (37.0 km/h)
- Range: 440 long tons (450 t; 490 short tons) oil fuel; 7,200 nautical miles (13,334 km) at 12 knots (22.2 km/h)
- Complement: 107
- Armament: 2 × QF 4-inch (102 mm) Mk.XIX guns, single mounts CP Mk.XXIII; up to 10 × QF 20 mm Oerlikon AA guns on twin mounts Mk.V and single mounts Mk.III; 1 × Hedgehog 24 spigot A/S projector; up to 150 depth charges

HMS Mourne (K261) was a River-class frigate of the Royal Navy (RN). Mourne was built to the RN's specifications as a Group II River-class frigate. She served in the North Atlantic during World War II.

As a River-class frigate, Mourne was one of 151 frigates launched between 1941 and 1944 for use as anti-submarine convoy escorts, named after rivers in the United Kingdom. The ships were designed by naval engineer William Reed, of Smith's Dock Company of South Bank-on-Tees, to have the endurance and anti-submarine capabilities of the Black Swan-class sloops, while being quick and cheap to build in civil dockyards using the machinery (e.g. reciprocating steam engines instead of turbines) and construction techniques pioneered in the building of the Flower-class corvettes. Its purpose was to improve on the convoy escort classes in service with the Royal Navy at the time, including the Flower class.

After commissioning in April 1943, Mourne served in convoy escort missions and participated in anti-submarine warfare exercises off Lough Foyle and Larne.

Following the Normandy landings of Operation Overlord, Mourne was deployed to the western entrance of the English Channel as a screening operation, serving as part of the 5th Escort Group. At 13:45 on 15 June 1944, the bow of Mourne was hit by a GNAT torpedo fired by German submarine U-767, causing an ignition in the ship magazine. The ship was sunk with the loss of 111 lives and 27 survivors. After initially fleeing, other ships in the flotilla, which included HMS Bickerton and HMS Kempthorne, returned to pick up the survivors.
