= HMS Grindall =

Frigate of the Royal Navy

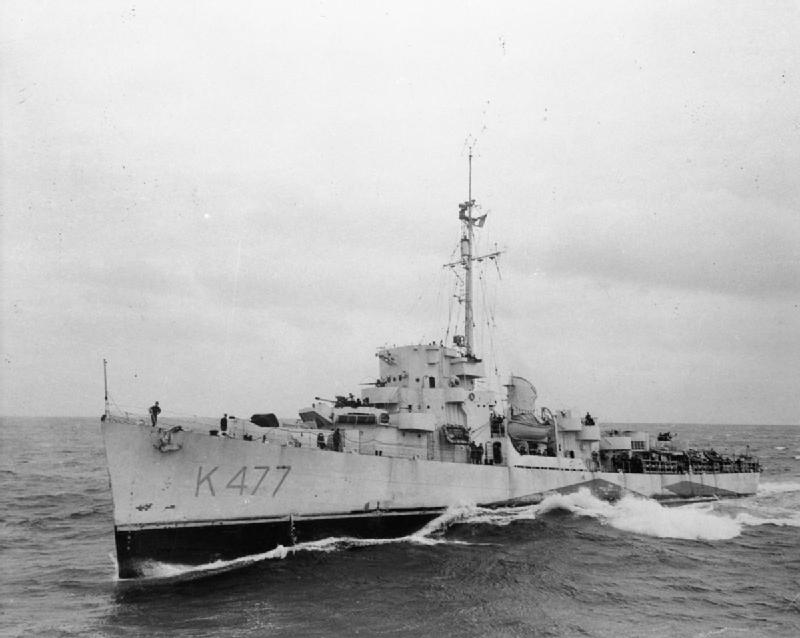
- HMS Grindall on 12 April 1944.

History

United States
- Name: USS Sanders (DE-273)
- Namesake: Eugene Thomas Sanders
- Ordered: 25 January 1942
- Builder: Boston Navy Yard, Boston, Massachusetts
- Laid down: 23 April 1943
- Launched: 4 June 1943
- Sponsored by: Mrs. Eugene Thomas Sanders
- Completed: 23 September 1943
- Fate: Transferred to United Kingdom 23 September 1943
- Acquired: Returned by United Kingdom 20 August 1945
- Name: USS Grindall (DE-273)
- Namesake: British name retained
- Commissioned: 20 August 1945
- Decommissioned: 19 October 1945
- Stricken: 1 November 1945
- Fate: Scrapping completed 28 May 1946

United Kingdom
- Name: HMS Grindall (K477)
- Namesake: Vice Admiral Richard Grindall (1750–1820), British naval officer who was commanding officer of HMS Prince at the Battle of Trafalgar in 1805
- Acquired: 23 September 1943
- Commissioned: 23 September 1943
- Decommissioned: 1945
- Identification: Pennant number K477
- Fate: Returned to United States 20 August 1945

General characteristics
- Class & type: Captain class frigate
- Displacement: 1,140 long tons (1,158 t)
- Length: 289.5 ft (88.2 m)
- Beam: 35 ft (11 m)
- Draught: 9 ft (2.7 m)
- Propulsion: Four General Motors 278A 16-cylinder engines; GE 7,040 bhp (5,250 kW) generators (4,800 kW); GE electric motors for 6,000 shp (4,500 kW); Two shafts
- Speed: 20 knots (37 km/h)
- Range: 5,000 nautical miles (9,260 km) at 15 knots (28 km/h)
- Complement: 156
- Sensors & processing systems: SA & SL type radars; Type 144 series Asdic; MF Direction Finding antenna; HF Direction Finding Type FH 4 antenna
- Armament: 3 × 3 in (76 mm)/50 Mk.22 guns; 1 × twin Bofors 40 mm mount Mk.I; 7–16 × 20 mm Oerlikon guns; Mark 10 Hedgehog antisubmarine mortar; Depth charges; QF 2-pounder naval gun

HMS Grindall (K477) was a British Captain-class frigate of the Royal Navy in commission during World War II. Originally constructed as the United States Navy Evarts-class destroyer escort USS Sanders (DE-273), she served in the Royal Navy from 1943 to 1945 and then in the U.S. Navy as USS Grindall (DE-273) from August to October 1945.

== Construction and transfer ==
The ship was ordered on 25 January 1942 as the U.S. Navy destroyer escort DE-273 and named USS Sanders on 23 February 1943, the first ship of the name after Ensign Eugene Thomas Sanders, who was killed in action aboard the battleship USS Arizona (BB-39) during the Japanese attack on Pearl Harbor. She was laid down by the Boston Navy Yard in Boston, Massachusetts, on 23 April 1943 and launched on 4 June 1943, sponsored by Mrs. Eugene Thomas Sanders. The United States transferred the ship to the United Kingdom under Lend-Lease on 23 September 1943.

== Service history ==
=== Royal Navy, 1943-1945 ===
The ship was commissioned into service in the Royal Navy as HMS Grindall (K477) on 23 September 1943 simultaneously with her transfer. She served on patrol and escort duty. On 15 April 1945, she joined the British frigate HMS Keats (K482) in a depth-charge attack that sank the German submarine U-285 in the North Atlantic Ocean southwest of Ireland at position 50°13′00″N 012°48′00″W.

The Royal Navy returned Grindall to the U.S. Navy on 20 August 1945 at Chatham Dockyard in England.

=== U.S. Navy, 1945 ===
The ship was commissioned into the U.S. Navy as USS Grindall (DE-273) on 20 August 1945 simultaneously with her return. She soon steamed to the Philadelphia Naval Shipyard in Philadelphia, Pennsylvania, where she remained until she was decommissioned on 19 October 1945.

== Disposal ==
The U.S. Navy struck Grindall from its Naval Vessel Register on 1 November 1945 and scrapped her at the Philadelphia Naval Shipyard, where her scrapping was completed on 28 May 1946.
