= HMS Prince (1788) =

Ship of the line of the Royal Navy

- Prince

History

Great Britain
- Name: HMS Prince
- Ordered: 9 December 1779
- Builder: Woolwich Dockyard
- Laid down: 1 January 1782
- Launched: 4 July 1788
- Fate: Broken up, 1837
- Notes: Participated in: Battle of Trafalgar

General characteristics
- Class & type: London-class ship of the line
- Tons burthen: 1871
- Length: 177 ft 6 in (54.10 m) (gundeck)
- Beam: 49 ft (15 m)
- Depth of hold: 21 ft (6.4 m)
- Propulsion: Sails
- Sail plan: Full-rigged ship
- Armament: 98 guns: Gundeck: 28 × 32 pdrs; Middle gundeck: 30 × 18 pdrs; Upper gundeck: 30 × 12 pdrs; Quarterdeck: 8 × 12 pdrs; Forecastle: 2 × 12 pdrs

HMS Prince was a 98-gun second rate ship of the line of the Royal Navy, launched on 4 July 1788 at Woolwich. She fought at the Battle of Trafalgar.

== Life ==
She saw relatively little action during her career and seems to have been a relatively poor sailer—she sailed, according to one observing captain, 'like a haystack.'

She was not immediately commissioned on the outbreak of war with Revolutionary France, lying in ordinary at Portsmouth in April 1794. Her hull was lengthened in 1796.

=== Trafalgar ===
By 1805 she was in service with the Channel Fleet under Captain Richard Grindall. At the Battle of Trafalgar, in October that year, she was passed by her whole division, and took over two hours to cover the two or three miles to reach the battle. By the time she arrived most of the enemy fleet was in British hands or had fled, leaving few targets for Prince's massive broadsides. She did fire on the Spanish flagship Principe de Asturias and Achille, but was not attacked and suffered no damage or casualties.

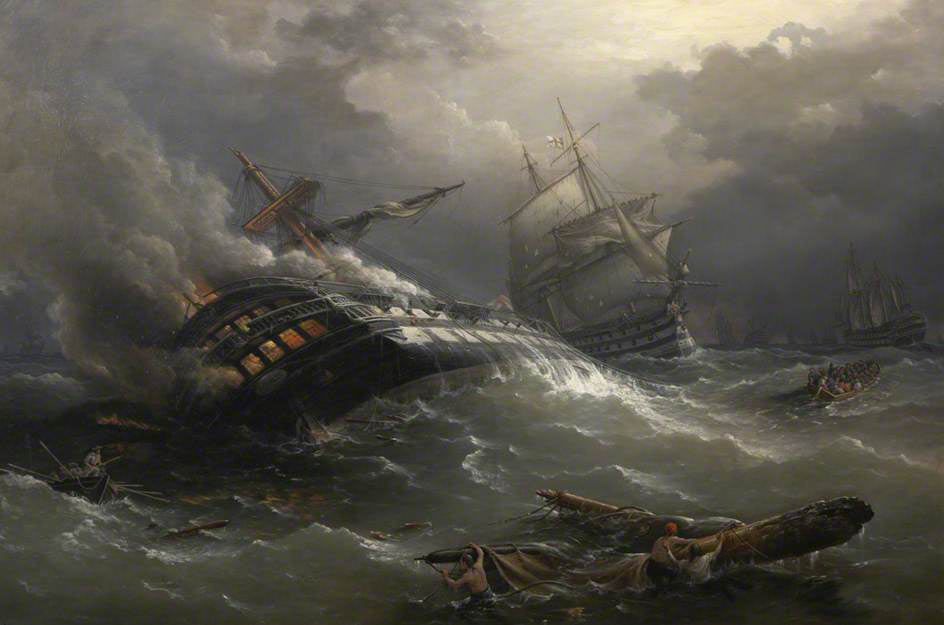
The rescue of Achille's crew by HMS Prince, painting by Richard Brydges Beechey

Whilst engaging Prince, Achille's fore top caught fire, and the next broadside against her brought her blazing main mast down, engulfing the ship in flames. At this point, knowing that Achille's fate was sealed and making the most of his unique position, Grindall ceased firing and wore round to clear her, before placing boats in the water to rescue French seamen from Achille and elsewhere. This proved hazardous: Achille's abandoned but loaded guns were set off by the intense heat now raging below decks, and she exploded at 5:45 pm, by which point only 100 men had been rescued from her. Nonetheless, Prince and nearby British ships were able to rescue hundreds of sailors from the water.

In the week of ferocious storms which followed the battle the sturdy Prince was invaluable, providing replacement stores to more battered ships, towing those that needed it, and saving many men from the heavily damaged other ships. She and the other undamaged British ships saved many others that would otherwise have sunk and at one point saved 350 men from the sinking Santíssima Trinidad who would otherwise have drowned, taking them to Gibraltar. Upon arrival there, however, she was ready to sail again in a matter of hours.

=== Later life ===
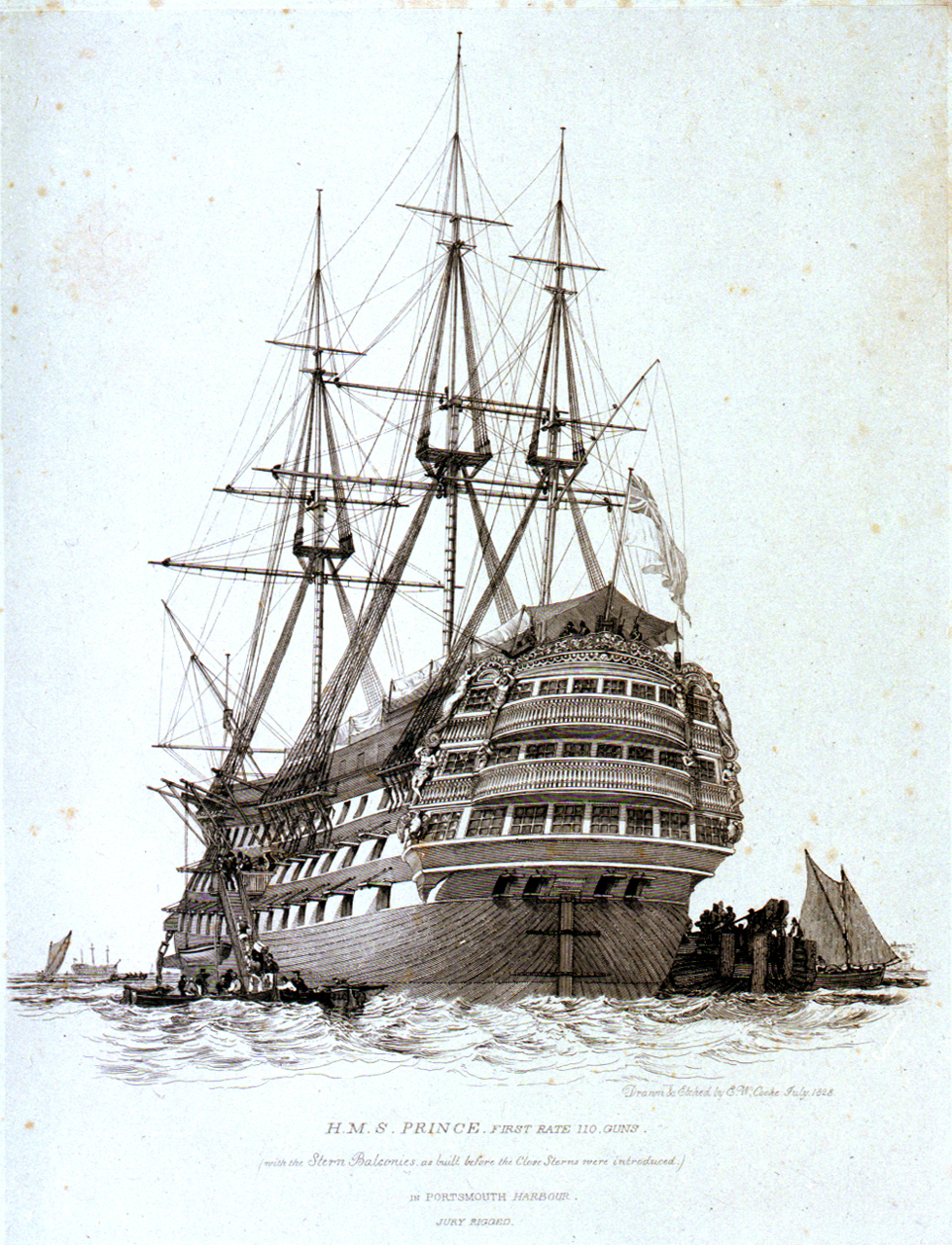
Prince (shown in July 1828 with stern balconies, as built before the closed sterns were introduced) in Portsmouth Harbour. Jury rigged

After the war she remained in Portsmouth until withdrawn from service and was broken up in 1837.
