= HMS Keats =

Frigate of the Royal Navy

History

United States
- Name: USS Tisdale (DE-278)
- Namesake: Ryland Dillard Tisdale
- Ordered: 25 January 1942
- Builder: Boston Navy Yard, Boston, Massachusetts
- Laid down: 5 June 1943
- Launched: 17 July 1943
- Completed: 19 October 1943
- Commissioned: never
- Fate: Transferred to United Kingdom 19 October 1943
- Acquired: Returned by United Kingdom 27 February 1946
- Stricken: 20 March 1946
- Fate: Sold 20 November 1946 for scrapping

United Kingdom
- Name: HMS Keats
- Namesake: Admiral Richard Goodwin Keats
- Acquired: 19 October 1943
- Commissioned: 19 October 1943
- Identification: Pennant number K482
- Fate: Returned to United States 27 February 1946

General characteristics
- Displacement: 1,140 long tons (1,158 t)
- Length: 289.5 ft (88.2 m)
- Beam: 35 ft (11 m)
- Draught: 9 ft (2.7 m)
- Propulsion: Four General Motors 278A 16-cylinder engines; GE 7,040 bhp (5,250 kW) generators (4,800 kW); GE electric motors for 6,000 shp (4,500 kW); Two shafts
- Speed: 20 knots (37 km/h)
- Range: 5,000 nautical miles (9,260 km) at 15 knots (28 km/h)
- Complement: 156
- Sensors & processing systems: SA & SL type radars; Type 144 series Asdic; MF Direction Finding antenna; HF Direction Finding Type FH 4 antenna
- Armament: 3 × 3 in (76 mm)/50 Mk.22 guns; 1 × twin Bofors 40 mm mount Mk.I; 7–16 × 20 mm Oerlikon guns; Mark 10 Hedgehog antisubmarine mortar; Depth charges; QF 2-pounder naval gun

HMS Keats (K482) was a British Captain-class frigate of the Royal Navy in commission during World War II. Originally constructed as the United States Navy Evarts-class destroyer escort USS Tisdale (DE-278), she served in the Royal Navy from 1943 to 1946.

== Construction and transfer ==
The ship was ordered on 25 January 1942 and laid down by the Boston Navy Yard in Boston, Massachusetts, on 5 June 1943 as the U.S. Navy destroyer escort USS Tisdale (DE-278), the first ship of the name in honour of Commander Ryland Dillard Tisdale (1894–1942) who had been killed in action during combat with the Moros on Mindanao on 23 May 1942. She was launched on 17 July 1943. The United States transferred the ship to the United Kingdom under Lend-Lease on 19 October 1943.

== Service history ==
The ship was commissioned into service in the Royal Navy as HMS Keats (K482) named in honour of Admiral Richard Goodwin Keats (who served in the Royal Navy during the American Revolution, French Revolution and Napoleonic wars, before being appointed Governor of the Royal Hospital Greenwich) 19 October 1943 simultaneously with her transfer. She served on patrol and escort duty.

On 27 January 1945, Keats shared credit with the British frigates HMS Bligh and HMS Tyler for a depth-charge attack that sank the German submarine U-1172 in the St George's Channel at position 52°24′00″N 005°42′00″W. On 15 April 1945, she joined the British frigate HMS Grindall in a depth-charge attack that sank the German submarine U-285 in the North Atlantic Ocean southwest of Ireland at position 50°13′00″N 012°48′00″W.

The Royal Navy returned Keats to the U.S. Navy on 27 February 1946.

== Disposal ==
The U.S. Navy struck Keats from its Naval Vessel Register on 20 March 1946 and sold her on 19 November 1946 to George H. Nutman, Inc., of Brooklyn, New York, for scrapping.

== Note ==
For a biography of Admiral Sir Richard Goodwin Keats G.C.B. see; Hannah, P., A Treasure to the Service, Green Hill, Adelaide, 2021, ISBN 978-1-922629-73-9
