= Grindall Island =

Island in Alaska, United States

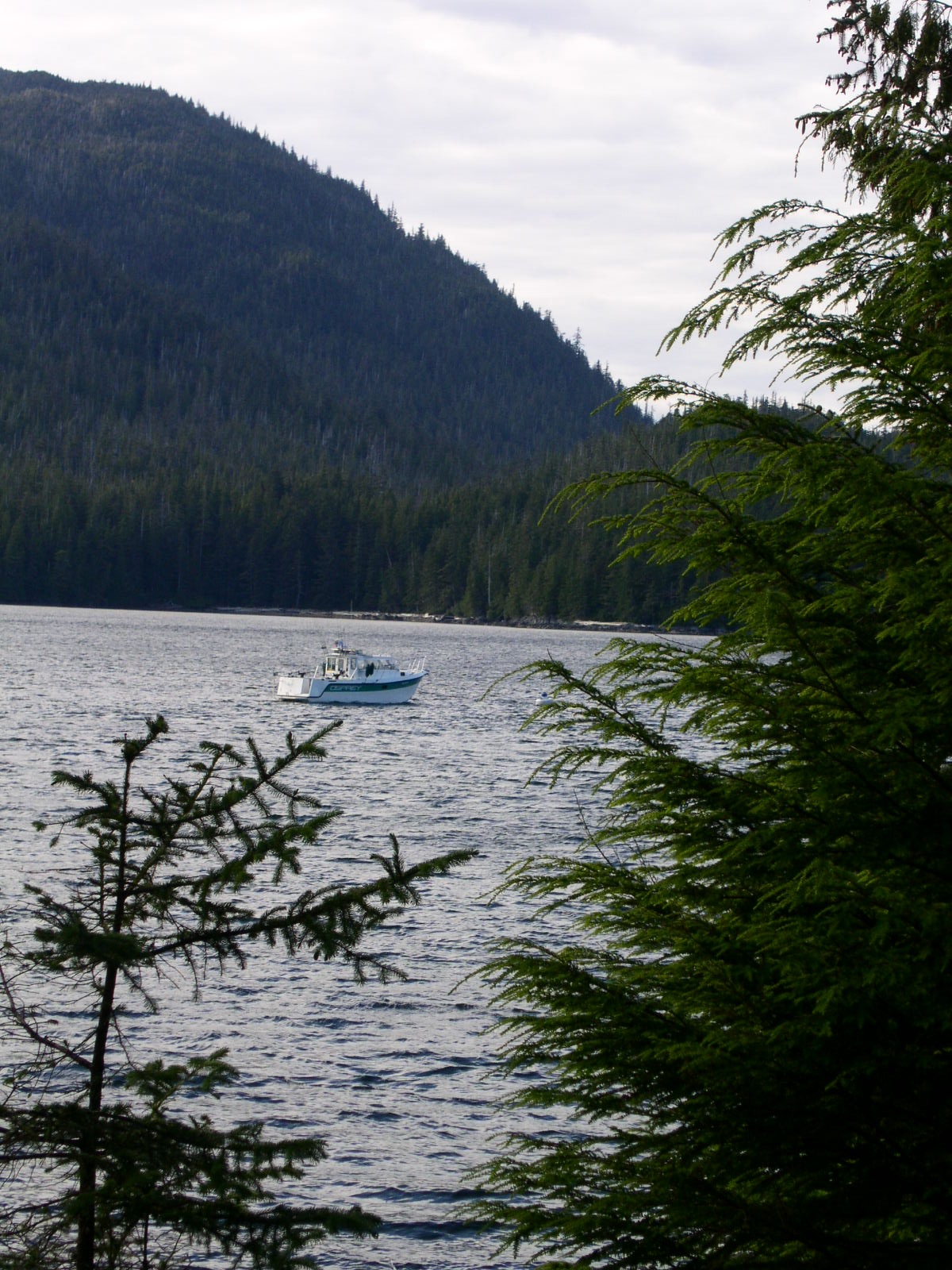
- A boat moored to the buoy in the north cove of Grindall Island
- Interactive map of Grindall Island

Geography
- Location: Clarence Strait, Prince of Wales – Hyder Census Area, Alaska
- Coordinates: 55.4429°N 132.1263°W
- Area: 1.5 sq mi (3.9 km^{2})
- Length: 1.5 mi (2.4 km)
- Width: 1 mi (2 km)

Administration
- United States
- State: Alaska
- County: Prince of Wales – Hyder Census Area, Alaska

Grindall Island is an island in the Grindall Island State Marine Park 18 miles (29 km) west of Ketchikan, Alaska, United States. The island is in a remote area, only accessible by boat or plane.

Captain George Vancouver named the nearby Grindall Point and Grindall Passage after his former sailing companion, the late Vice Admiral Sir Richard Grindall. The state of Alaska later named Grindall Island in line with the point and passage.

== Geography ==
Grindall Island is located in Clarence Strait off Grindall Point on the east side of Prince of Wales Island west of Ketchikan. The island has two lakes in the center with marshland around them.

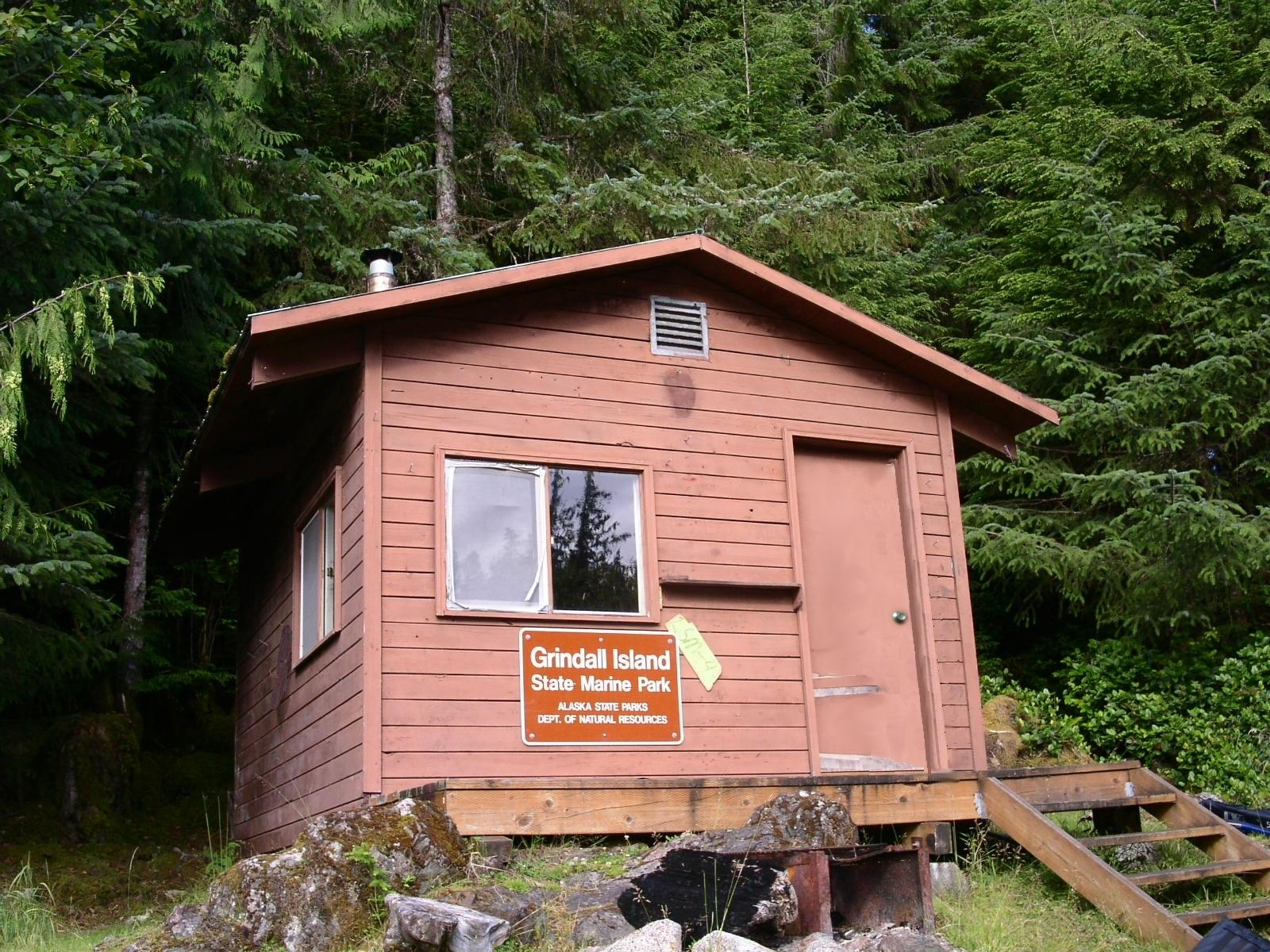
Cabin on Grindall Island

== History ==
A homestead was established between 1922 and the 1950s on Grindall Island, and it was operated as a fox farming island.

== Marine State Park ==
Grindall Island has been declared a Marine State Park. It includes a public use cabin and a mooring buoy in the north harbor and a variety of recreational opportunities on and around the island.
