= German submarine U-269 =

German World War II submarine

History

Nazi Germany
- Name: U-269
- Ordered: 20 January 1941
- Builder: Bremer Vulkan, Bremen-Vegesack
- Yard number: 34
- Laid down: 18 September 1941
- Launched: 24 June 1942
- Commissioned: 19 August 1942
- Fate: Sunk, 25 June 1944

General characteristics
- Class & type: Type VIIC submarine
- Displacement: 769 tonnes (757 long tons) surfaced; 871 t (857 long tons) submerged
- Length: 67.10 m (220 ft 2 in) o/a; 50.50 m (165 ft 8 in) pressure hull
- Beam: 6.20 m (20 ft 4 in) o/a; 4.70 m (15 ft 5 in) pressure hull
- Height: 9.60 m (31 ft 6 in)
- Draught: 4.74 m (15 ft 7 in)
- Installed power: 2,800–3,200 PS (2,100–2,400 kW; 2,800–3,200 bhp) (diesels); 750 PS (550 kW; 740 shp) (electric)
- Propulsion: 2 shafts; 2 × diesel engines; 2 × electric motors
- Speed: 17.7 knots (32.8 km/h; 20.4 mph) surfaced; 7.6 knots (14.1 km/h; 8.7 mph) submerged
- Range: 8,500 nmi (15,700 km; 9,800 mi) at 10 knots (19 km/h; 12 mph) surfaced; 80 nmi (150 km; 92 mi) at 4 knots (7.4 km/h; 4.6 mph) submerged
- Test depth: 230 m (750 ft); Crush depth: 250–295 m (820–968 ft)
- Complement: 4 officers, 40–56 enlisted
- Armament: 5 × 53.3 cm (21 in) torpedo tubes (four bow, one stern); 14 × torpedoes or 26 × TMA or 39 × TMB tube-launched mines; 1 × 8.8 cm (3.46 in) deck gun (220 rounds); 2 × 20 mm AA (4,380 rounds)

Service record
- Part of: 8th U-boat Flotilla; 19 August 1942 – 31 March 1943; 11th U-boat Flotilla; 1 April – 31 October 1943; 6th U-boat Flotilla; 1 November 1943 – 25 June 1944
- Identification codes: M 50 929
- Commanders: Oblt.z.S. Karl-Heinrich Harlfinger; 19 August 1942 – 29 April 1943; Oblt.z.S. Otto Hansen; June – 4 September 1943; Oblt.z.S. / Kptlt. Karl-Heinrich Harlfinger; 5 September 1943 – 21 March 1944; Oblt.z.S. Georg Uhl; 6 April – 25 June 1944
- Operations: 5 patrols: 1st patrol: a. 23 March – 23 April 1943; b. 24 – 27 April 1943; c. 6 – 14 July 1943; 2nd patrol: a. 22 July – 4 September 1943; b. 5 – 8 September 1943; 3rd patrol: a. 4 November – 15 December 1943; b. 12 – 15 April 1944; 4th patrol: 22 – 28 May 1944; 5th patrol: a. 6 – 15 June 1944; b. 18 – 25 June 1944
- Victories: None

German submarine U-269 was a Type VIIC U-boat of Nazi Germany's Kriegsmarine during World War II. The U-boat was laid down on 18 September 1941 by Bremer Vulkan at Bremen-Vegesack, launched on 24 June 1942 and commissioned on 19 August under the command of Oberleutnant zur See Karl-Heinrich Harlfinger.

During her career the submarine failed to sink or damage any vessels, but neither did she lose any crew members prior to its sinking on 25 June 1944.

== Design ==
German Type VIIC submarines were preceded by the shorter Type VIIB submarines. U-269 had a displacement of 769 tonnes (757 long tons) when at the surface and 871 tonnes (857 long tons) while submerged. She had a total length of 67.10 m (220 ft 2 in), a pressure hull length of 50.50 m (165 ft 8 in), a beam of 6.20 m (20 ft 4 in), a height of 9.60 m (31 ft 6 in), and a draught of 4.74 m (15 ft 7 in). The submarine was powered by two Germaniawerft F46 four-stroke, six-cylinder supercharged diesel engines producing a total of 2,800 to 3,200 metric horsepower (2,060 to 2,350 kW; 2,760 to 3,160 shp) for use while surfaced, two AEG GU 460/8–27 double-acting electric motors producing a total of 750 metric horsepower (550 kW; 740 shp) for use while submerged. She had two shafts and two 1.23 m (4 ft) propellers. The boat was capable of operating at depths of up to 230 metres (750 ft).

The submarine had a maximum surface speed of 17.7 knots (32.8 km/h; 20.4 mph) and a maximum submerged speed of 7.6 knots (14.1 km/h; 8.7 mph). When submerged, the boat could operate for 80 nautical miles (150 km; 92 mi) at 4 knots (7.4 km/h; 4.6 mph); when surfaced, she could travel 8,500 nautical miles (15,700 km; 9,800 mi) at 10 knots (19 km/h; 12 mph). U-269 was fitted with five 53.3 cm (21 in) torpedo tubes (four fitted at the bow and one at the stern), fourteen torpedoes, one 8.8 cm (3.46 in) SK C/35 naval gun, 220 rounds, and one twin 2 cm (0.79 in) C/30 anti-aircraft guns. The boat had a complement of between forty-four and sixty.

== Service history ==
After training with the 8th U-boat Flotilla in the Baltic Sea, U-269 was assigned to the 11th U-boat Flotilla based in Bergen, Norway.

U-269 first left Kiel on 16 March 1943 to operate from bases in Norway, carrying out two patrols in the Barents Sea in the summer of 1943, one under the command of Oberleutnant zur See Karl-Heinrich Harlfinger in March and April, and another under Oblt.z.S. Otto Hansen in July, August and September.

Reassigned to the 6th U-boat Flotilla, on 4 November 1943 the U-boat left Bergen for her third patrol in the Atlantic under the command of the newly promoted Kapitänleutnant Karl-Heinrich Harlfinger. On 1 December Allied forces attacked the U-boat, causing serious damage and forcing U-269 to abort her patrol. She reached St. Nazaire on the French Atlantic coast on the 15th.

In France, command was assumed by Oberleutnant zur See Georg Uhl, who made one short patrol in the Bay of Biscay in May 1944, then sailed from Brest on 6 June ("D-Day") to St. Peter Port, Guernsey, three days later sailing into the English Channel on her final patrol.

=== Sinking ===
U-269 was sunk on 25 June 1944 south-east of Torquay, in position 50°01′N 2°59′W. The U-boat was detected by the Royal Navy frigate HMS Bickerton, of the 5th Support Group, which immediately attacked with depth charges. The first attack knocked out all the lights aboard the U-boat, while the second ruptured the seals on the drive shafts, allowing water to rush in. The frigate's third depth charge run destroyed pipes, valves and electrical connections. Realizing that the situation was hopeless, Uhl ordered U-269 to surface, and prepared to abandon and scuttle the boat. The submarine surfaced within range of the frigate, which had just dropped a fourth set of depth charges. The U-boat began to sink immediately, while the survivors swam away or escaped on rafts. Bickerton picked up the 39 survivors. There were 13 dead, including Captain Uhl.

The wreck of U-269 was located in 1951, during a search for the missing British submarine Affray, this was confirmed by nautical archaeologist Innes McCartney in 1999.

=== Wolfpacks ===
U-269 took part in three wolfpacks, namely:

- Eisbär (27 March – 15 April 1943)
- Coronel (4 December 1943)
- Dragoner (22 – 28 May 1944)

== Bibliography ==
- Busch, Rainer; Röll, Hans-Joachim (1999). German U-boat commanders of World War II : a biographical dictionary. Translated by Brooks, Geoffrey. London, Annapolis, Md: Greenhill Books, Naval Institute Press. ISBN 1-55750-186-6.
- Busch, Rainer; Röll, Hans-Joachim (1999). Der U-Boot-Krieg, 1939-1945: Deutsche U-Boot-Verluste von September 1939 bis Mai 1945 [German U-boat losses from September 1939 to May 1945] (in German). Vol. IV. Hamburg, Berlin, Bonn: Mittler. ISBN 3-8132-0514-2.
- Gröner, Eric; Jung, Dieter; Maass, Martin (1991). German Warships 1815-1945: U-boats and Mine Warfare Vessels. Vol. 2. Translated by Thomas, Keith; Magowan, Rachel. London: Conway Maritime Press. ISBN 0-85177-593-4.
- McCartney, Innes (2002). Lost patrols : submarine wrecks of the English Channel. Penzance: Periscope. ISBN 978-1-90438-104-4.
- Kemp, Paul (1999). U-Boats Destroyed - German Submarine Losses in the World Wars. London: Arms & Armour. ISBN 1-85409-515-3.
- Blüm, Jörg; Poppe, Joachim (2015). "Versenkte Jugend". Erinnerungen eines deutschen U-Boot-Fahrers auf U-269 (in German). Norderstedt: BoD – Books on Demand. ISBN 978-3-7347-7972-5.
