= HMS Bligh =

Frigate of the Royal Navy

History

United States
- Name: USS Liddle
- Builder: Bethlehem-Hingham Shipyard Inc., Hingham, Massachusetts
- Laid down: 10 May 1943
- Identification: DE-76
- Fate: Transferred to UK, returned 17 October 1945 and sold for scrap, 13 June 1946

United Kingdom
- Name: Bligh
- Namesake: William Bligh
- Launched: 31 July 1943
- Commissioned: 23 October 1943
- Identification: K467
- Fate: Returned to US Navy on 17 October 1945

General characteristics
- Class & type: Buckley-class destroyer escort/Captain-class frigate
- Displacement: 1,800 long tons (1,829 t) fully loaded
- Length: 306 ft (93 m) overall
- Beam: 36.5 ft (11.1 m)
- Draught: 11 ft (3.4 m) fully loaded
- Speed: 24 knots (44 km/h)
- Endurance: 5,500 nautical miles (10,200 km) at 15 knots (28 km/h)
- Complement: Typically between 170 & 180

HMS Bligh was a Captain-class frigate active during World War II. She was named after William Bligh, commander of HMS Director at the Battle of Camperdown during the French Revolutionary War, and commander of HMS Bounty.

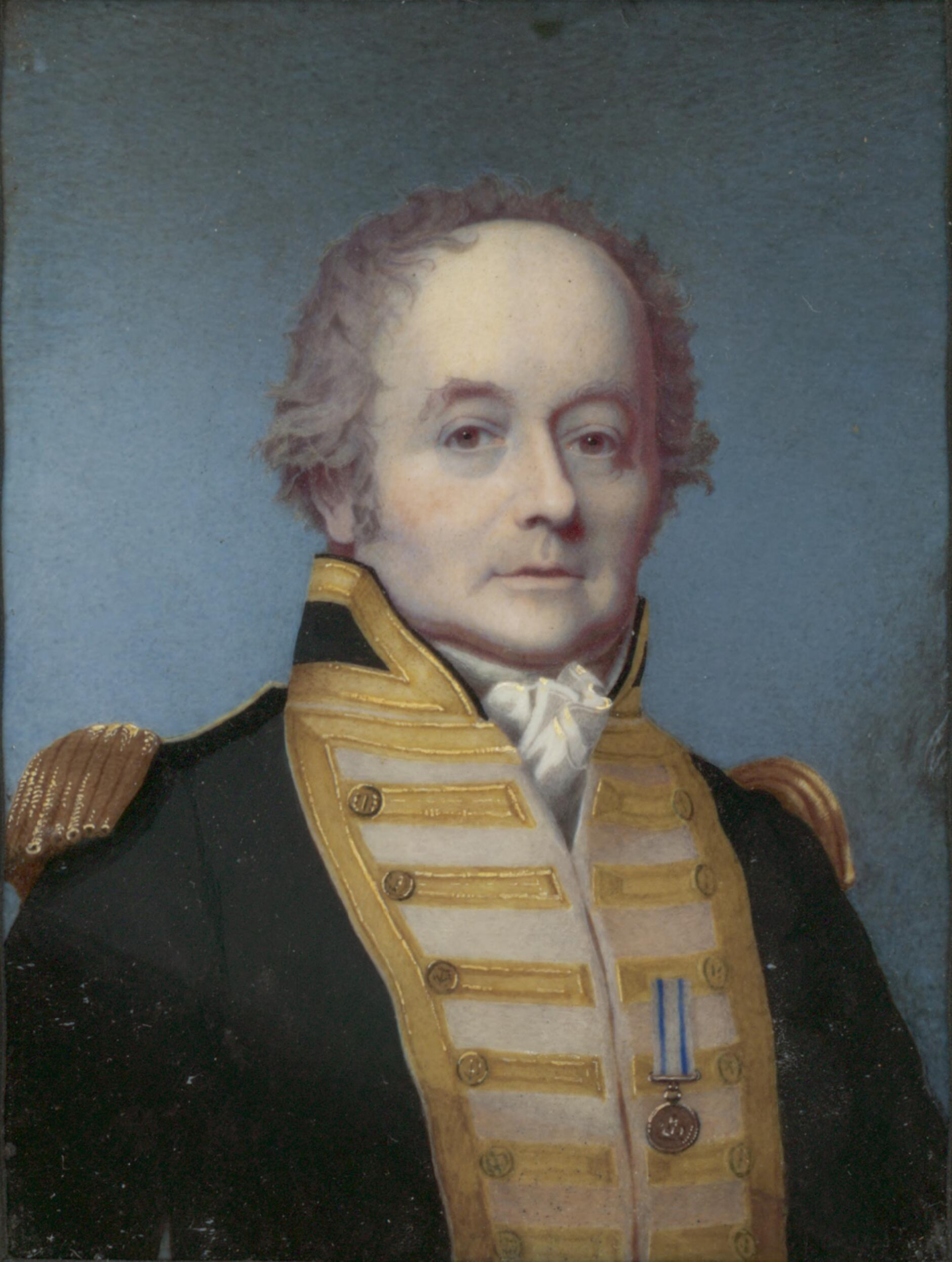
William Bligh in 1814

Originally destined for the US Navy as a turbo-electric (TE) type Buckley-class destroyer escort, HMS Bligh was provisionally given the name USS Liddle, a name that was later reassigned to another ship. However, the delivery was diverted to the Royal Navy before the launch.

== Service history ==
HMS Bligh served exclusively with the 5th Escort Group taking part in operations in the Eastern Atlantic, the English Channel, and off Normandy.

On 6 May 1944, Bligh, together with HMS Bickerton, HMS Aylmer and two Swordfish aircraft (Sqdn. 825) of the British escort carrier HMS Vindex, attacked and sank the U-boat U-765 at position 52°30′N 28°28′W using depth charges, resulting in the loss of 37 hands.

On 7 November 1944, an accidental firing of an anti-aircraft gun while docked at Liverpool caused both death and injury on the troopship RMS Capetown Castle.

On 27 January 1945, Bligh, along with HMS Tyler and HMS Keats attacked and destroyed the submarine U-1172 with depth charges, causing the loss of all 52 hands at position 52°24′N 05°42′W.
