= E.E.P. Tisdall =

Evelyn Ernest Percy Tisdall (1907–1977) was a British journalist and schoolmaster and writer. He is best known as a writer of biographies.

Tisdall was educated at Sherborne and Sandhurst and then became a Fleet Street journalist. before turning to biography, mostly of British and European royalty. He served in the army during the Second World War, after which he became headmaster of Dennington House School, near Barnstaple. His royal books sold well on publication, but are now regarded as 'slightly sensational' and 'slightly hostile'.

== Bibliography ==
- Queen Victoria’s John Brown: The life story of the most remarkable royal servant in British history (1938)
- The wanton Queen (1939)
- She made world chaos: The intimate story of the Empress Frederick of Prussia (1940)
- Restless consort: The invasion of Albert the conqueror (1952)
- Unpredictable Queen: The intimate life of Queen Alexandra (1953)
- Royal destiny: The royal Hellenic cousins (1955)
- The Dowager Empress (1957)
- The Prince Imperial: A study of his life among the British (1959)
- Queen Victoria’s private life (1961)
- Mrs Pimpernel Atkyns (1965)
