= HMS Tyler =

Frigate of the Royal Navy

History

United States
- Name: unnamed (DE-567)
- Builder: Bethlehem-Hingham Shipyard, Hingham, Massachusetts
- Laid down: 6 October 1943
- Launched: 20 November 1943
- Completed: 14 January 1944
- Commissioned: never
- Fate: Transferred to United Kingdom 14 January 1944
- Acquired: Returned by United Kingdom 12 November 1945
- Stricken: 8 January 1946
- Fate: Sold 23 May 1946 for scrapping; Scrapped summer 1946

United Kingdom
- Name: HMS Tyler (K576)
- Namesake: Admiral Sir Charles Tyler (1760–1835), British naval officer who was commanding officer of HMS Tonnant at the Battle of Trafalgar in 1805
- Acquired: 14 January 1944
- Commissioned: 14 January 1944
- Decommissioned: 1945
- Fate: Returned to United States 12 November 1945

General characteristics
- Class & type: Captain-class frigate
- Displacement: 1,400 long tons (1,422 t)
- Length: 306 ft (93 m)
- Beam: 36.75 ft (11.2 m)
- Draught: 9 ft (2.7 m)
- Propulsion: Two Foster-Wheeler Express "D"-type water-tube boilers; GE 13,500 shp (10,070 kW) steam turbines and generators (9,200 kW); Electric motors for 12,000 shp (8,900 kW); Two shafts
- Speed: 24 knots (44 km/h)
- Range: 5,500 nautical miles (10,200 km) at 15 knots (28 km/h)
- Complement: 186
- Sensors & processing systems: SA & SL type radars; Type 144 series Asdic; MF Direction Finding antenna; HF Direction Finding Type FH 4 antenna
- Armament: 3 × 3 in (76 mm) /50 Mk.22 guns; 1 × twin Bofors 40 mm mount Mk.I; 7–16 × 20 mm Oerlikon guns; Mark 10 Hedgehog antisubmarine mortar; Depth charges; QF 2-pounder naval gun
- Notes: Pennant number K576

HMS Tyler (K576) was a British Captain-class frigate of the Royal Navy in commission during World War II. Originally constructed as a United States Navy Buckley-class destroyer escort, she served in the Royal Navy from 1944 to 1945.

== Construction and transfer ==
Allocated to the United Kingdom on 10 June 1943, the ship was laid down as the unnamed U.S. Navy destroyer escort DE-567 by Bethlehem-Hingham Shipyard, Inc., in Hingham, Massachusetts, on 6 October 1943 and launched on 20 November 1943. She was transferred to the United Kingdom upon completion on 14 January 1944.

== Service history ==
Commissioned into service in the Royal Navy as the frigate HMS Tyler (K567) on 14 January 1944 simultaneously with her transfer, the ship was assigned to patrol and escort duty in the English Channel and also supported the invasion of Normandy in the summer of 1944.

During 1945, Tyler alternated between escort duty in the North Atlantic Ocean and patrols and escort missions in the English Channel. On 21 January 1945, she picked up the sole survivor of the Norwegian merchant ship Galatea, which the German submarine U-1051 had torpedoed and sunk off Bardsey Island in St. George's Channel in position 52°40′00″N 005°23′00″W. On 27 January 1945 she joined the British frigates HMS Bligh (K467) and HMS Keats (K482) in a depth charge attack which sank the German submarine U-1172 in St. George's Channel in position 52°24′00″N 005°42′00″W.

After the end of World War II, Tyler steamed to the United States, arriving at the Philadelphia Naval Shipyard in Philadelphia, Pennsylvania, on 31 October 1945. The Royal Navy formally returned her to the U.S. Navy on 12 November 1945.

== Disposal ==
The U.S. Navy struck Tyler from its Naval Vessel Register on 8 January 1946. She was sold on 23 May 1946 for scrapping to Hugo Neu of New York City and later resold to the Northern Metal Company of Philadelphia. She was scrapped in the summer of 1946.
