= Richard Grindall =

Royal Navy admiral (1750–1820)

Vice-Admiral Sir Richard Grindall KCB
- Born: 1750; Holborn, London, England
- Died: 23 May 1820; Wickham, Hampshire, England
- Military career
- Allegiance: Great Britain; United Kingdom
- Branch: Royal Navy
- Service years: 1772–1805
- Rank: Vice-Admiral
- Commands: HMS Thalia; HMS Irresistible; HMS Prince
- Conflicts: American Revolutionary War; French Revolutionary Wars; Battle of Groix; Napoleonic Wars; Battle of Trafalgar

Vice-Admiral Sir Richard Grindall KCB (1750 – 23 May 1820) was an officer in the British Royal Navy whose distinguished career during the American War of Independence, the French Revolutionary War and the Napoleonic Wars was highlighted by his presence at the battle of Trafalgar in 1805, Despite being slow and ungainly, his 98-gun ship Prince was instrumental in the final stages of the battle and especially in the chaotic storm which followed, when many of the British fleet would have been lost but for the efforts of Grindall and other captains of largely undamaged ships.

== Biography ==
Born in 1750, Grindall joined the Resolution on 7 January 1772 as an able seaman on James Cook's second voyage (1772–75). He messed with the midshipmen during the voyage.

Grindall had a late initiation to the Royal Navy, only making lieutenant on 29 November 1776, a full eight years after most of his contemporaries had reached that rank. Almost his entire service was spent in ships of the line especially flagships, including Barfleur, Samuel Hood's flagship in the West Indies on 21 December 1781. In this ship he saw his first action off Martinique and was promoted to post-captain on 13 March 1783.

The outbreak of the Revolutionary War saw Grindall in command of the frigate Thalia, but his tenure was uneventful. He was transferred to Irresistible in 1795 and was engaged with the French Brest fleet in the battle of Groix. The next eight years were slow and uneventful for Grindall, consisting of constant blockade and convoy work and little chance for action or excitement. Following the Peace of Amiens, this seemed likely to continue, as he was given the huge Prince, which had a reputation for "sailing like a haystack". This unfortunately proved to be the case, and the blockade duty continued, joining Nelson off Cádiz in 1805. On 21 October, the combined Franco-Spanish fleet attempted to escape and Grindall lined up in Collingwood's division to attack them.

Unfortunately for Grindall's hopes of action, the ship was so slow that she was passed by her whole division, and took over two hours to cover the two or three miles to reach the battle. By the time she arrived most of the enemy fleet was in British hands or had fled, leaving few targets for the Prince's massive broadsides. She did fire on the Spanish flagship Principe de Asturias and the already blazing Achille but was not attacked and suffered no damage or casualties. Making the most of his unique position, Grindall immediately launched boats and rescued hundreds of struggling survivors in the water, including many from the sinking Achille.

In the week of ferocious storms which followed the battle the sturdy Prince was invaluable, providing replacement stores to more battered ships and towing those that needed it. At one point she also saved 350 men from the sinking Santissima Trinidad who would otherwise have drowned. When his laden ship arrived at Gibraltar, it was ready to sail again in a matter of hours.

Thanks to his long and favourable service record, Grindall was made a rear admiral of the Blue on 9 November 1805, of the White on 28 April 1808, of the Red on 25 October 1809 and Knight Commander of the Order of the Bath on 2 January 1815, in the general promotion which followed the action on 9 November. However, this meant the effective end of his career, as so many admirals were created that not enough posts could be found for them. Grindall was one of the promoted men who never commanded at sea again, taking a shore appointment in late 1805 and retiring with his family soon afterwards as a vice admiral of the Blue on 31 July 1810, of the White on 12 August 1812, and of the Red on 4 June 1814. His retirement was a difficult one however, as two of his sons who had joined the navy in their father's footsteps, Edmund and Festing Horatio, died in 1811 and 1812 from unconnected illness. The latter had also been present at Trafalgar, as a midshipman on board Victory. When Richard Grindall died in Wickham in 1820 he was interred next to them at St Nicholas Church, Wickham, Hampshire, joined by his wife Katherine in 1831.

== Namesakes ==
Grindall Island in the Clarence Strait, Alaska, takes its name from nearby Grindall Point and Grindall Passage, named after him by Captain George Vancouver.

== In fiction ==
Grindall appears as a character in the book Hornblower and the Hotspur by C. S. Forester, ISBN 0-14-002901-X.
