= Ryland Dillard Tisdale =

American naval officer (1894 –1942)

- Born: November 15, 1894
- Died: May 23, 1942 (aged 47)
- Military career
- Allegiance: United States of America
- Branch: Navy
- Service years: 1911-1942
- Rank: Commander
- Conflicts: World War I World War II
- Awards: Navy Cross; Silver Star (posthumously)

Commander Ryland Dillard Tisdale (November 15, 1894 – May 23, 1942) was an American naval officer who served during both World War I and II. He was awarded the Navy Cross and posthumously the Silver Star.

== World War I participation ==
Tisdale was trained at the Naval Ordnance Proving Ground (now the Naval Ordnance Station) located in Charles County, Maryland, about 25 miles south of Washington, D.C. He was appointed a midshipman at the U.S. Naval Academy on July 7, 1911 and graduated on June 5, 1915. Between his commissioning and the entry of the United States into World War I, Ens. Tisdale served in USS Virginia and USS Nevada.

On June 5, 1917, less than two months after the declaration of war, Tisdale reported on board USAT Antilles, apparently for duty with an armed-guard gun crew assigned to that chartered Army transport. He served in that ship until she was torpedoed off Brest, France, on October 17.

Tisdale subsequently received a special letter of commendation from the Secretary of the Navy for displaying ". . . coolness and courage in command of the forward guns, . . ." and for not leaving his post ". . . until he was forced to dive from the bridge of the sinking vessel." Tisdale also assisted other Antilles survivors onto life rafts. He was picked up by either Alcedo or Corsair and taken into Brest. On October 23, he took passage on Bridge for Great Britain, where he reported for duty to the senior United States Navy officer present. After temporary duty on Seattle, he returned to the United States on December 12.

== Inter-war activity ==
In late January 1918, Tisdale took a three-week course of instruction at the Fuel Oil Testing Plant in Philadelphia, Pennsylvania. From there, he went to Bath, Maine, for duty in connection with the outfitting and commissioning of USS Wickes. When she was placed in commission on July 31, Lt. Tisdale became her engineering officer. From Wickes, he went to USS Lamberton as executive officer and in December 1919 moved to USS Hogan where he held the same post.

Tisdale's tour of duty in Hogan ended on June 11, 1920 when he reported to the Naval Academy for post graduate studies in engineering. A year later, he checked in at the New York Navy Yard for practical instruction during the summer, before entering Columbia University on September 28 for further course work which lasted until the early summer of 1922, when he moved to the General Electric Co. in Schenectady, New York, until the end of July. Tisdale rounded out his scholastic efforts late that summer with six weeks of study at the Westinghouse Electric and Manufacturing Co., at Pittsburgh, Pennsylvania.

Tisdale returned to sea duty in the fall of 1922. On October 16, he reported to USS Argonne in Philadelphia and, on November 8, transferred to USS California. He served in that battleship until April 1925, when he went ashore once more, this time to a billet in the Bureau of Engineering. In 1927, he completed his tour in Washington and returned to sea as executive officer of USS Bridge. On September 25, 1928, he reported for duty at Shanghai, China.

== Earning the Navy Cross ==
Five days later, he assumed his first command, the Asiatic Fleet destroyer Stewart. That command lasted 13 months. He was detached on October 31, 1929 and, after a month with the 16th Naval District, Lt. Comdr. Tisdale took over his second command, Palos, and began patrolling the upper reaches of the Yangtze in that gunboat. During this tour of duty, Lt. Comdr. Tisdale earned the Navy Cross. Late in July 1930, he and his ship were in the vicinity of Changsha when that city was attacked, taken, looted, and lost by Chinese communists. Tisdale and his crew assisted in the evacuation of Americans and other foreigners. He also led his crew and ship past the city for two firing passes as a show of force to discourage looting of the foreign concessions. The citation states, in part, that, ". . . the loss of American and other foreign property was limited by his timely action."

Lt. Comdr. Tisdale's next assignment took him to the Georgia School of Technology for a two-year tour of duty with the Naval Reserve Officer Training Corps detachment located there. From there, he went back to the Asiatic Fleet to join the staff of the Commander, Destroyer Squadron 5. He served in that capacity from January 19 to November 11, 1935 when he became Captain of the Yard at Olongapo in the Philippines. Tisdale was placed on the retired list on June 30, 1936, with the rank of commander.

== World War II ==
In 1940, the United States began preparing for the contingency of war. Comdr. Tisdale returned to the colors in July and served for a brief period in the Bureau of Ships at Washington, D.C. In October, he was relieved of duty; however, within another month, he was back on active duty.

On January 14, 1941, Tisdale reported for duty at the Cavite Navy Yard near Manila in the Philippines. He served in the defense of those islands after the Japanese invasion on December 8, 1941. After the surrender at Corregidor in May 1942, Tisdale continued to resist the enemy on Mindanao. On May 23, 1942, he was killed at Tamparan in Lanao Province during action with Moros—who had collaborated with the Japanese. Comdr. Tisdale was awarded the Silver Star for his actions in the Philippines. The citation states:

The President of the United States of America takes pride in presenting the Silver Star (Posthumously) to Commander (Retired) Ryland D. Tisdale (NSN: 0-8990), United States Navy, for conspicuous gallantry and intrepidity in action in the Philippine Islands during World War II. Commander Tisdale was offered passage on the last plane to leave Corregidor when it was apparent that surrender was inevitable. Commander Tisdale refused and offered his place in the plane to Mr. Kuder who also refused. Commander Tisdale was quoted as saying that he preferred to remain and see the thing through. Mr. Kuder stated that on Thursday, April 30, 1942, the fighting in the area around Damsalan was very heavy, and that Commander Tisdale banded together a small group of officers and enlisted men, including some civilians, and threw in with Lieutenant Colonel Vesy of the Philippine Army to make a last stand against the Japanese.

== Namesake ==
The USS Tisdale (DE-33), commissioned on October 11, 1943, was named in his honor.
