= USS Eisele (DE-34) =

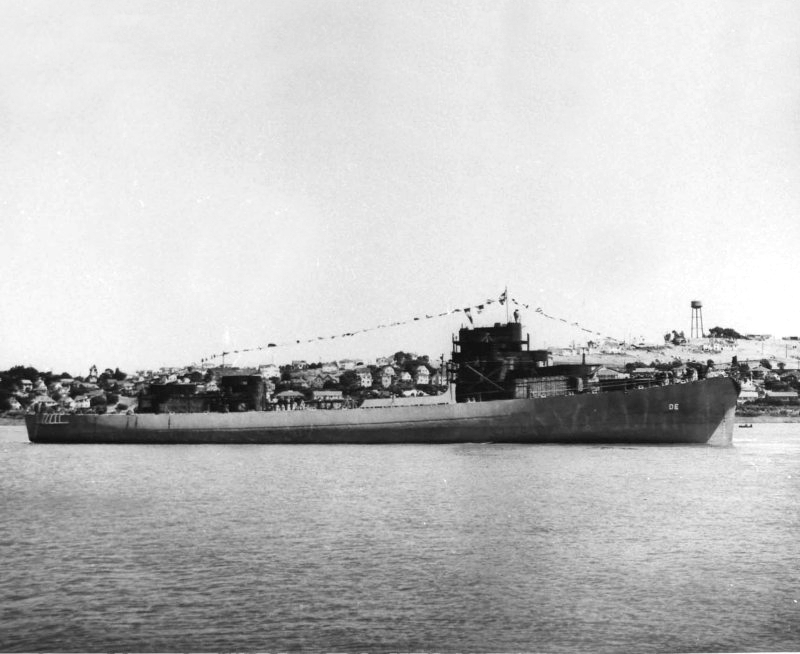
- USS Eisele after her launch at the Mare Island Naval Shipyard on 29 June 1943

History

United States
- Name: USS Eisele
- Builder: Mare Island Navy Yard
- Laid down: 23 January 1943
- Launched: 29 June 1943
- Commissioned: 18 October 1943
- Decommissioned: 16 November 1945
- Stricken: 28 November 1945
- Honors and awards: 2 battle stars (World War II)
- Fate: Sold for scrapping, 29 January 1948

General characteristics
- Type: Evarts-class destroyer escort
- Displacement: 1,140 long tons (1,158 t)
- Length: 289 ft 5 in (88.21 m)
- Beam: 35 ft 1 in (10.69 m)
- Draft: 8 ft 3 in (2.51 m)
- Propulsion: 4 × General Motors Model 16-278A diesel engines with electric drive
- Speed: 21 knots (39 km/h; 24 mph)
- Range: 4,150 nmi (7,690 km)
- Complement: 156
- Armament: 3 × single 3"/50 Mk.22 dual-purpose guns; 1 × Hedgehog Projector Mk.10; 8 × Mk.6 depth charge projectors; 2 × Mk.9 depth charge tracks

USS Eisele (DE-34) was an Evarts-class short-hull destroyer escort in the service of the United States Navy.

== Design ==
The Evarts-class destroyer escorts were 289 ft 5 in (88.21 m) long overall, and they had a beam of 35 ft 2 in (10.72 m). They had an average draft of 10 ft 1 in (3.07 m) at their full load displacement of 1,416 long tons (1,439 t). Each ship had a normal crew numbered 156 officers and sailors.

Eisele was propelled by a pair of diesel motors manufactured by General Motors, which drove a pair of screw propellers. Her propulsion system was rated to produce 6,000 brake horsepower (4,500 kW) for a top speed of 19.5 knots (36.1 km/h; 22.4 mph). Oil storage amounted to between 131 and 197 long tons (133 and 200 t), which allowed a cruising radius of up to 6,000 nautical miles (11,000 km; 6,900 mi) at an economical pace of 10 knots (19 km/h; 12 mph).

The ship's armament consisted of a main battery of three 3-inch (76 mm) /50-caliber guns in individual pivot mounts, which could be used against air or surface targets. These were supported by a light anti-aircraft battery that initially consisted of four 1.1 in (28 mm) /75-caliber guns in a quadruple mount and nine 20 mm (0.79 in) Oerlikon guns. For attacks against submarines, the ship was equipped with a Hedgehog mortar, eight depth charge throwers, and two depth charge racks.

== Service history ==
Eisele was at built at Mare Island Navy Yard, Solano County, California, originally as BDE-34. Intended for the British under the Lend-Lease agreement, she was retained by the U.S. Navy and assigned the name Eisele, after George Eisele, who had been killed on 12 November 1942 during the Naval Battle of Guadalcanal. The ship was launched on 29 June 1943 and was sponsored by Mrs. George A. Eisele, mother of the ship's namesake. Eisele was commissioned on 18 October 1943.

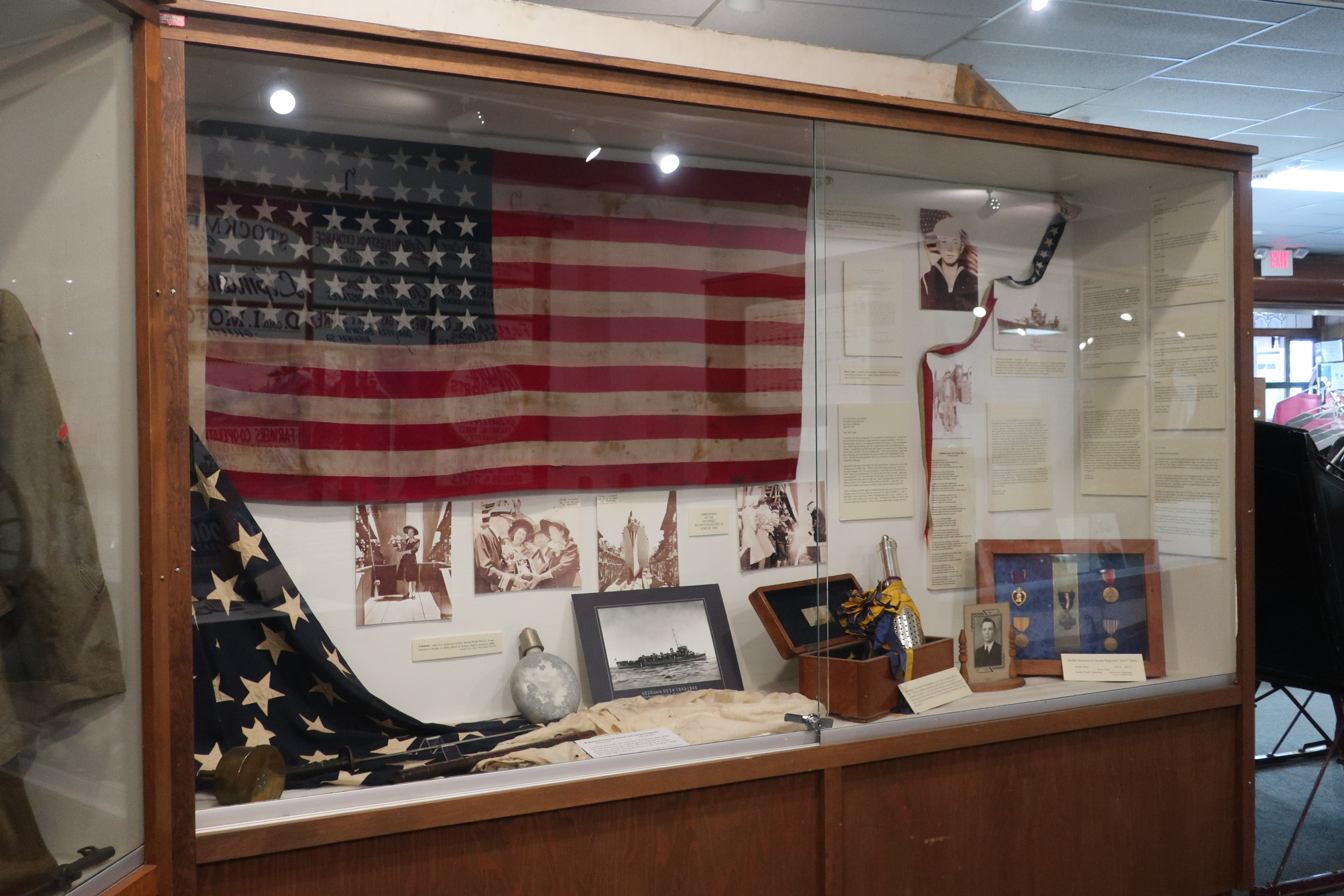
An exhibit of George Eisele's awards and the bottle used to christen USS Eisele at Campbell County Rockpile Museum in Gillette, Wyoming

Eisele sailed from San Francisco on 11 December 1943 and after touching at Pearl Harbor and Funafuti, arrived in the Gilberts on 5 January 1944. She patrolled off Tarawa and guarded convoys between the Gilberts and Marshalls, returning to Pearl Harbor on 19 May. In June she departed for Eniwetok and screened transports to Guam for support landings on 27 July. She continued to serve in the occupation of the Marianas on screen, convoy escort, and air-sea rescue duty.

Returning to Pearl Harbor on 28 August 1944, Eisele conducted training exercises with submarines until October when she sailed for Eniwetok. There she screened fast tanker convoys safely past the rest of the Carolines, still Japanese held, to Palau and on to the Philippines. In March 1945 Eisele arrived at Ulithi, the staging point for the Okinawa operation, and sailed on the 21st screening escort carriers providing the air cover to capture Okinawa. Except for escorting a convoy to Saipan, Eisele remained with the CVEs off Okinawa fighting off constant air attack.

Eisele was homeward bound on 17 June, and was decommissioned at Seattle on 16 November 1945. She was sold on 29 January 1948.

== Awards ==
- American Campaign Medal
- Asiatic–Pacific Campaign Medal (with two service stars)
- World War II Victory Medal
