= Ingham (surname) =

Ingham is a surname. Notable people with the surname include:

- Albert Ingham (1900–1967), British mathematician
- Alice Ingham (1830–1890), Roman Catholic nun and missionary
- Barrie Ingham (1932–2015), British actor
- Benjamin Ingham (1712–1772), English Methodist missionary
- Bernard Ingham (1932–2023), British journalist and former press secretary to Margaret Thatcher
- Beryl Ingham (1901–1960), British dancer and actor, wife of George Formby
- Charles C. Ingham (died 1863), Irish artist
- Craig Ingham (born 1965), New Zealand cricketer
- Dane Ingham (born 1999), New Zealand association football player
- Elaine Ingham (1952–2026), American microbiologist and soil biology researcher
- Eric Ingham (1944–2017), English rugby league footballer
- Harry Ingham (1882 – after 1915), English footballer
- Jai Ingham (born 1993), New Zealand footballer
- Jane Ingham (1897–1982), English botanist and scientific translator
- John Ingham (businessman) (1928–2003), Australian businessman, racehorse owner and breeder
- Mary Bigelow Ingham (1832–1923), American writer and educator
- Mary Hall Ingham (1866–1937), American suffragist and reformer
- Michael Ingham (bishop) (born 1949), Canadian Anglican bishop
- Michael Ingham (cricketer) (born 1957), English cricketer
- Michael Ingham (footballer) (born 1980), Northern Irish footballer
- Mike Ingham (born 1950), British broadcaster
- Nathan Ingham (born 1993), Canadian soccer player
- Oliver Ingham (1287–1344), English knight and administrator
- Peter Ingham (bishop) (1941–2024), Australian bishop
- Peter Ingham (cricketer) (born 1956), British cricket player
- Robert Ingham (1793–1875), British barrister and politician
- Samuel Ingham (1793–1881), American politician
- Samuel D. Ingham (1779–1860), American politician
- William Ingham (1882 – after 1915), English footballer
