= Mary Ingham =

Mary Ingham may refer to:

- Mary Bigelow Ingham (1832–1923), American writer and educator
- Mary Hall Ingham (1866–1937), American suffragist and reformer
