= Rider University =

Private university in Lawrence Township, New Jersey, US

- Former names: Trenton Business College (1865–1896); Rider Business College (1896–1920); Rider College (1920–1994)
- Motto: In Omnia Paratus (Latin)
- Motto in English: In all things prepared
- Type: Private university
- Established: 1865; 161 years ago
- Academic affiliations: CIC; NAICU; Sea-grant
- Endowment: $89.6 million (2025)
- President: John R. Loyack
- Faculty: >200 full time
- Students: 3,693
- Location: Lawrenceville, New Jersey, United States; 40.280°N 74.738°W
- Campus: suburban, 303 acres (1.23 km^{2})
- Colors: Cranberry and Grey
- Nickname: Broncs
- Sporting affiliations: NCAA Division I: Metro (primary); MAC (wrestling)
- Website: www.rider.edu

Rider University is a private university in Lawrence Township, New Jersey, United States. It consists of three academic units: the Norm Brodsky College of Business, the College of Liberal Arts and Sciences, which includes Westminster Choir College, and the College of Education and Human Services.

== History ==
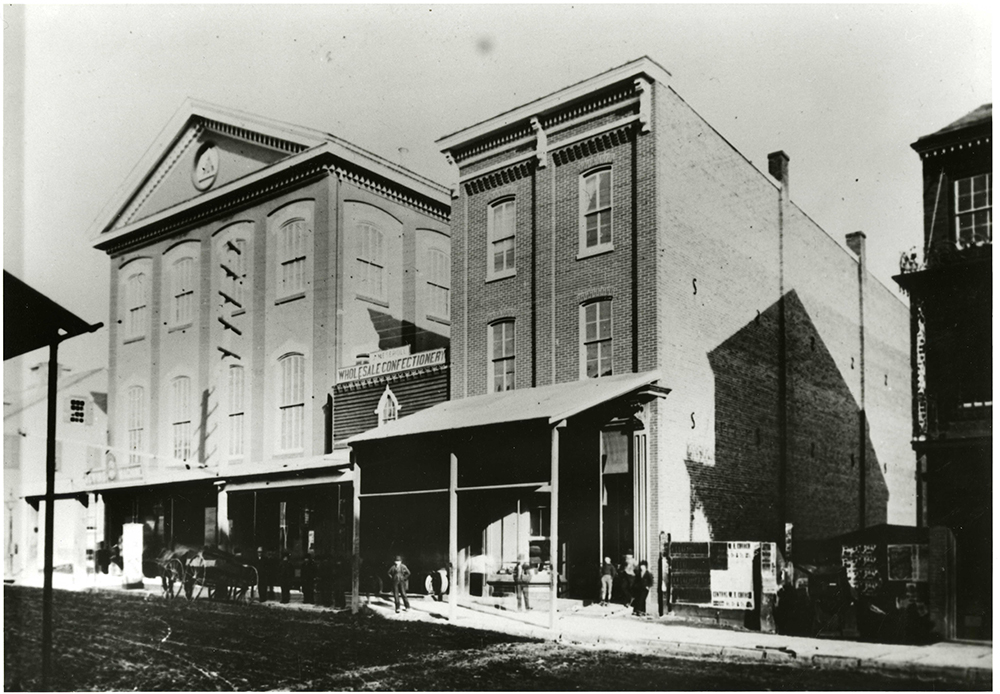
Temperance Hall, 1865, the original home of the Trenton Business College

The school was founded as Trenton Business College on October 1, 1865, by Henry Beadman Bryant and Henry D. Stratton, operators of the Bryant and Stratton chain of private business schools. The school was located in Temperance Hall at the corner of South Broad and Front Streets in Trenton, New Jersey. Andrew J Rider was appointed as its first president. President Rider owned 500 acres of cranberry bogs near Hammonton, New Jersey. This is why the school colors are cranberry and white.

The school grew and periodically moved to larger quarters. In 1886 women were admitted. In 1896 the school was renamed Rider Business College. President Rider stepped down the following year.

In 1920 the institution moved to East State Street in Trenton and officially became known as Rider College. In 1922 the New Jersey Board of Education granted Rider College permission to confer the degrees of Bachelor of Accounts and Bachelor of Commercial Science. In 1957 Rider Business College introduced liberal studies leading to a Bachelor of Arts degree.

In 1959 Rider College moved its campus to a 283-acre (115 ha) suburban tract on Route 206 in Lawrence Township, N.J. On November 15, 1961, President Franklin F. Moore (a 1927 alumnus of the college) announced the gradual reorganization of the college into five separate schools, each headed by a dean who would report to the provost. The changes took effect with the 1962–63 academic year. The five schools included a new School of Liberal Arts and Sciences.

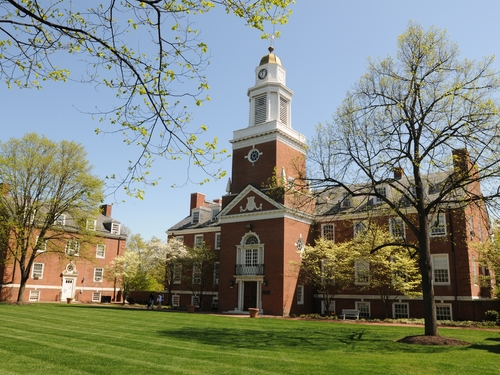
Williamson Hall at Westminster Choir College

Rider College merged with nearby Westminster Choir College (WCC), located in Princeton, New Jersey, in 1991–92. On April 13, 1994, the college became Rider University.

In 2005 Rider completed its 63,000-square-foot (5,900 m^{2}) Student Recreation Center (SRC), a 186-bed residence hall, and three-story additions to Ziegler and Hill Residence Halls. The SRC contains locker rooms, a 3,600-square-foot (330 m^{2}) fitness room and various athletic facilities.

Rider University's bonds have been rated as below-investment-grade since 2020. As of 2023, the school has experienced financial difficulties and a loss of a fifth of its student body due to declining enrollment. In November of 2025, Rider announced a restructuring plan that included faculty layoffs, salary reductions and other cost-cutting measures. Its audited financial statements for fiscal 2025 reported a $12.6 million loss from operating activities, compared with a $21.4 million operating loss in fiscal 2024.

=== Presidents ===
Rider has had eight presidents:

1. Andrew Jackson Rider (1866–1898)
2. Franklin Benjamin Moore (1898–1934)
3. Franklin Frazee Moore (1934–1969)
4. Frank Nelson Elliott (1969–1990)
5. J. Barton Luedeke (1990–2003)
6. Mordechai Rozanski (2003–2015)
7. Gregory Dell'Omo (2015–2025)
8. John R. Loyack (2025–present)

== Campus ==
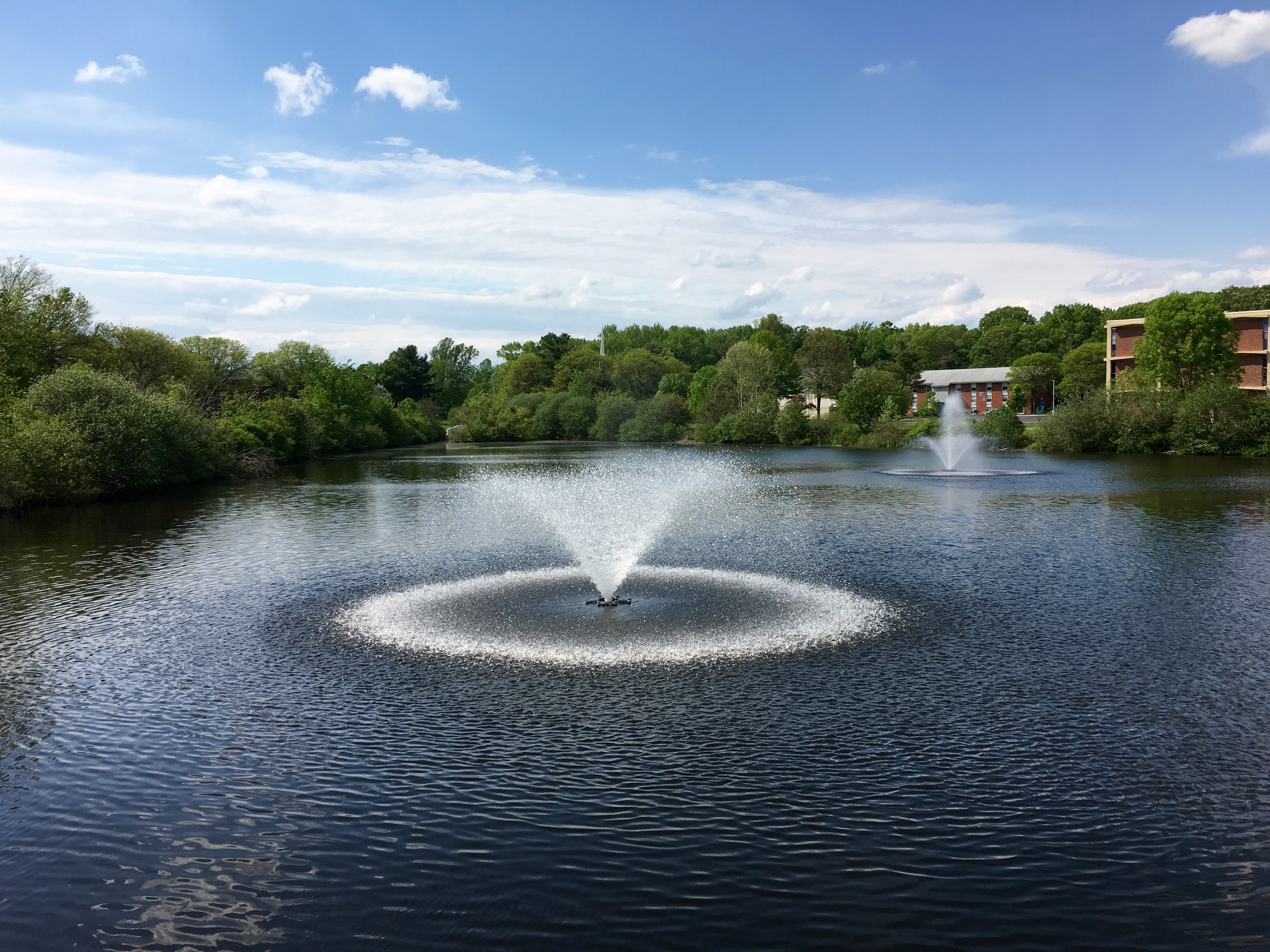
Centennial Lake

The 280-acre (1.1 km^{2}) Lawrenceville campus is in a suburban area three miles (5 km) north of Trenton and five miles (8 km) south of Princeton.

=== Academic buildings ===
Classes are held in Birenbaum Fisher Hall, The Mike and Patti Hennessy Science and Technology Center, the Fine Arts Center, Anne Brossman Sweigart Hall and Lynch Adler Hall. Built in 2011, Lynch Adler Hall is a Leadership in Energy and Environmental Design silver certified, 21,250-square-foot (1,974 m^{2}) building.

== Libraries ==
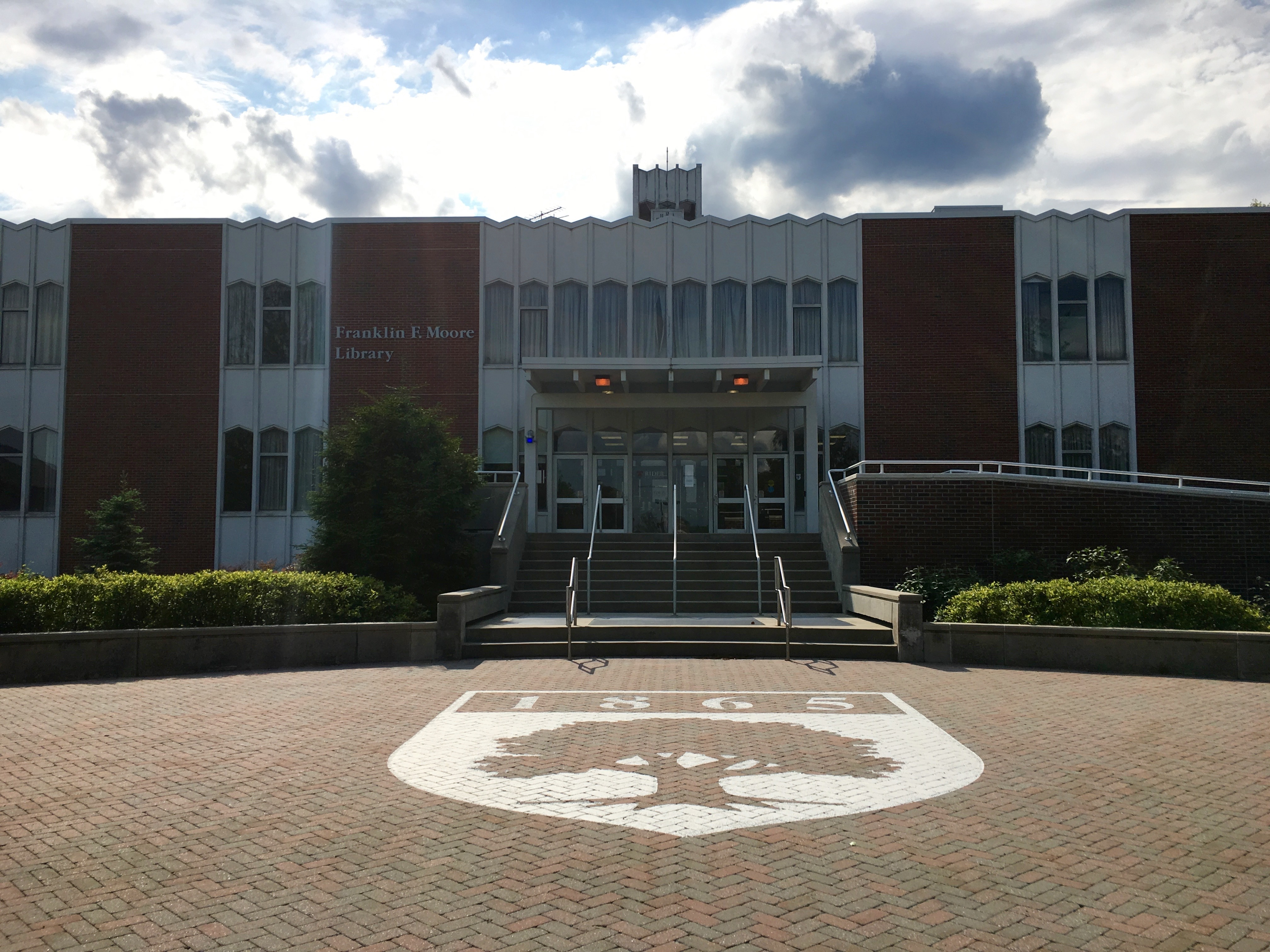
The Franklin Moore Library

The Franklin F. Moore Library supports the academic programs with a collection of more than 481,000 volumes, 2,000 periodical titles, 650,000 microforms, 134 online databases, electronic access to 42,000 journals, and an audiovisual collection. Westminster Choir College's Talbott Library has specialized music resources including 75,000 books, music scores and periodicals, a choral music reference collection of more than 80,000 titles and more than 31,000 sound and video recordings.

Rider Libraries are the official depository for records created by the New Jersey Business Teachers Association and the Eastern Business Teachers Association. In special collections, there is a microfilm collection of Civil War Era diplomatic correspondence between the United States, France and Great Britain. It also holds a major collection of Delaware Valley newspapers reaching back to the 18th century.

== Publications and media ==
The Shadow Yearbook
First published in 1923 two years after the institution officially changed its name to Rider College.
The Rider News
The school's student newspaper, founded in 1930, is now published weekly on Wednesdays between September and May.
WRRC-FM 107.7 The Bronc
Student-run radio station, founded in 1962.
Venture
The literary magazine welcomes submissions from students’ art and literature focusing on any topic.
The Rider University Network (R.U.N.)
The student organization produces television programs in the campus studio. Programs are broadcast on campus and online, founded in 2000.
BroncVision
Rider Athletics' student-oriented ESPN+ broadcast and video production team, founded in 2010.

== Student life ==
Rider offers more than 150 student clubs and organizations. There are also more than a dozen Greek organizations. In addition to social Greek organizations, there are professional and honorary fraternities.

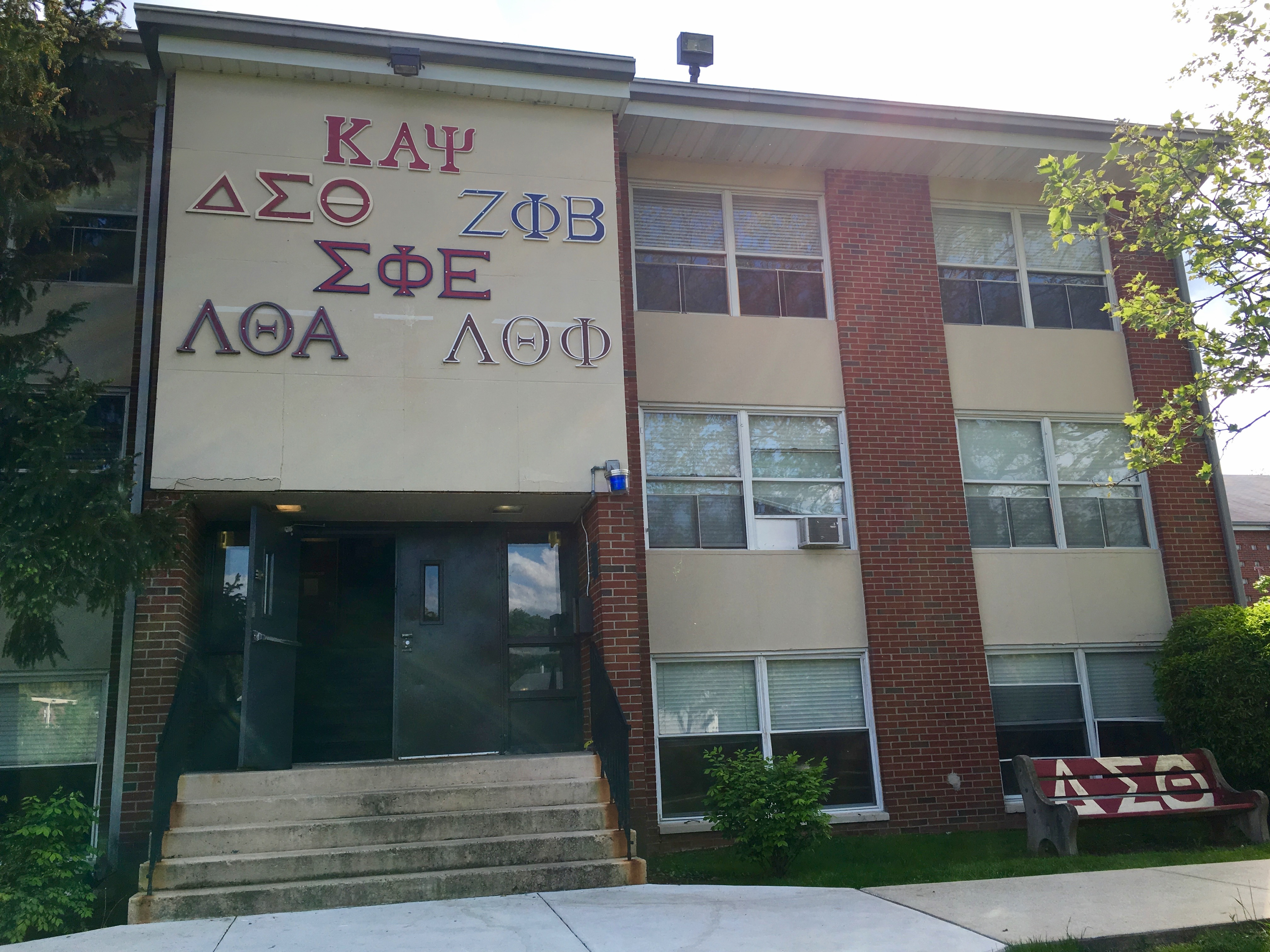
University House, one of the dorms devoted to Greek life

On March 30, 2007, 18-year-old student Gary DeVercelly died of alcohol poisoning after heavy drinking at a Phi Kappa Tau fraternity house. The incident was tied to a longstanding hazing tradition involving dangerous quantities of alcohol. Two Rider University officials, including the dean of students, and three students were indicted for aggravated hazing; the charges were dismissed for lack of evidence. Settlement of the civil lawsuit resulted in major policy concessions by the university.

== Athletics ==
Athletic teams are nicknamed the Broncs. The school competes in the NCAA Division I Metro Conference. As the Metro is a non-wrestling conference, Rider's wrestling team competes as a member of the Mid-American Conference.

The intercollegiate sports program at Rider was started by coach Clair Bee in the 1920s. Two of the school's most famous athletic alumni are former Notre Dame basketball coach and ESPN sportscaster Digger Phelps, who played basketball at Rider from 1959 to 1963, and Jason Thompson, who played basketball at Rider from 2004 to 2008 and was drafted by the Sacramento Kings.

The university competed in football until 1951, when the football team was disbanded.

In 2007, the university redesigned its athletic logo.

Scott Ruskan, an alum of Rider Track & Field, received the Pat Tillman Award for Service at the 2026 ESPY Awards. In 2021, Ruskan joined the United States Coast Guard and was instrumental in leading the rescue of campers at Camp Mystic near Corpus Christi, Texas following catastrophic floods.

== Notable alumni ==
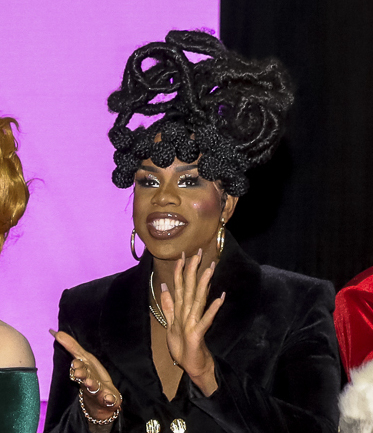
- Monét X Change, drag queen and winner of RuPaul's Drag Race All Stars 4
  In entertainment, Rider graduates include Monét X Change, drag queen and winner of the fourth season of RuPaul's Drag Race All Stars, and documentarian Gerald Peary.
- In government, Rider graduates include Nathaniel Barnes, Liberian Ambassador to the United Nations; Craig Carpenito, former United States Attorney for the District of New Jersey; Frederick W. Donnelly, former mayor of Trenton, New Jersey; and Mark S. Schweiker, MA, 44th Governor of Pennsylvania.
- In sports, Rider graduates include Florian Valot, professional soccer player for FC Cincinnati; Jack Armstrong, 1990 Major League Baseball all-star and world champion;Al Downing, 1967 MLB All-Star and strikeout champion and 1971 MLB Comeback Player of the Year; Stella Johnson, professional basketball player in WNBA and all-time leading Bronc scorer; Jeff Kunkel, professional baseball player; Caroline Lind, MBA, Olympic Gold Medal rower at the 2008 Summer Olympics in Beijing; Digger Phelps, ESPN college basketball analyst and former Notre Dame Fighting Irish basketball coach; Bobby Smith, National Soccer Hall of Fame member; Jason Thompson, basketball player in the NBA; and Scott Ruskan, track & field athlete and the recipient of the Pat Tillman Award for Service at the 2026 ESPY Awards.
