= John Collins Bryant =

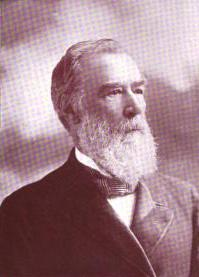
John C. Bryant co-founder of Bryant & Stratton College

John Collins Bryant (1821–1901) was an American physician, author, and the co-founder and namesake of Bryant & Stratton College and Bryant University in Smithfield, Rhode Island.

Bryant was born on December 21, 1821, in Ebley in Gloucestershire, England, to John Bryant, a farmer, and Pamela (Collins) Bryant. Bryant immigrated to Ohio from England with his family in 1829, and his father acquired a farm in Ohio. During the winters Bryant attended the local public schools in Ohio and then Norwalk Seminary, a Methodist school, and then he graduated from Cleveland Medical College in 1846 before practicing medicine in Amherst, Ohio. Bryant married Hannah M. Clarke on May 21, 1851, and they had three children. Along with his brother, Henry Beadman Bryant, and his brother-in-law, Henry Dwight Stratton, Bryant graduated from Folsom Business College in Cleveland, Ohio. The trio later purchased the school from the owner, Ezekiel G. Folsom, who founded his school in 1848. Bryant & Stratton College was officially organized in 1854 to provide practical workplace education, and was formerly known as Bryant and Stratton Business Institute. In addition to purchasing the Cleveland school, Bryant and Stratton established a number of business schools that operated under the name of Bryant & Stratton & Co's chain of International Commercial Colleges in most major US cities. By 1864 as many as 50 schools existed. John C. Bryant served as president of the Buffalo Bryant and Stratton Business College from 1860 until he died in 1901. After Henry Bryant's death, John sold all of his interest in the schools, but the one in Buffalo. He died on November 6, 1901, in Buffalo, New York.
