= Bryant University =

Private university in Smithfield, Rhode Island, US

- Former names: Bryant and Stratton College (1863–1935); Bryant College (1935–2004)
- Motto: Cognitio Virtus Successus (Latin)
- Motto in English: Knowledge, Character, Success. The Character of Success
- Type: Private university
- Established: 1863; 163 years ago
- Academic affiliations: Space-grant
- Endowment: $249.3 million (2025)
- President: Ross Gittell
- Administrative staff: 265
- Students: 3,751
- Location: Smithfield, Rhode Island, United States; 41.92545°N 71.53241°W
- Campus: 428 acres (1.73 km^{2})
- Colors: Black & Gold
- Nickname: Bulldogs
- Sporting affiliations: NCAA Division I – AmEast; CAA Football
- Mascot: Tupper the Bulldog
- Website: www.bryant.edu

Bryant University is a private university in Smithfield, Rhode Island, United States. It has three colleges, the College of Arts and Sciences, School of Health and Behavioral Sciences, and the College of Business, and is accredited by the New England Commission of Higher Education.

== History ==
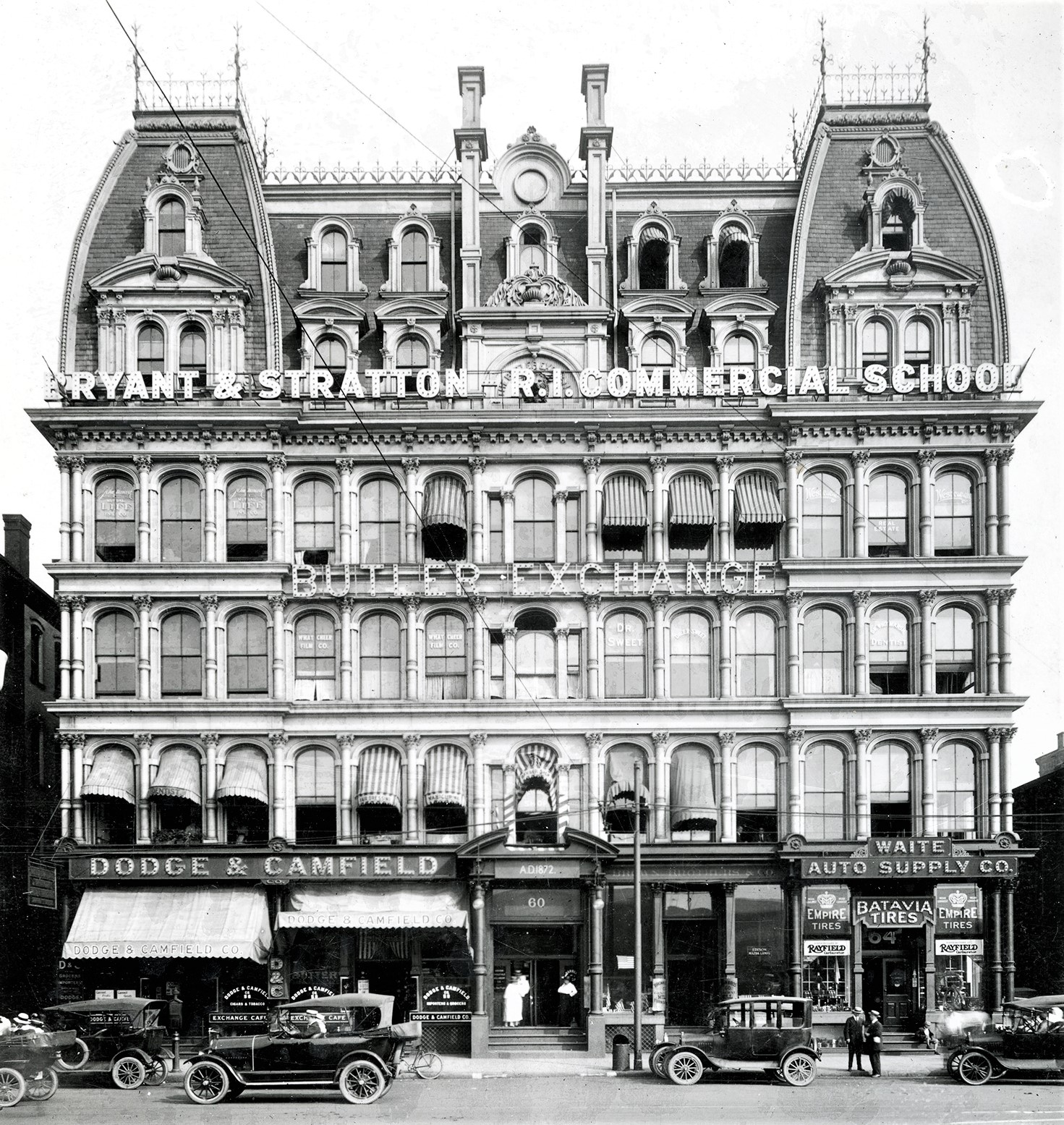
The Butler Exchange building housed the Providence branch of Bryant & Stratton College, the predecessor of Bryant

Henry B. Bryant, co-founder of Bryant & Stratton

=== Butler Exchange and downtown Providence ===
Bryant University was founded in 1863 as a branch of a national school which originally taught bookkeeping and methods of business communication and was named after founders, John Collins Bryant and Henry Beadman Bryant. This separate chain of schools is currently called Bryant & Stratton College. In 1878 the Providence branch of Bryant & Stratton was sold to a teacher at the school, Thomas Stowell. Stowell died in 1916 the school was sold again and merged with Henry Jacobs' Rhode Island Commercial School (founded 1898). Classes for Bryant and Stratton College were originally held in the now demolished Butler Exchange building located in downtown Providence, at 111 Westminster Street on Kennedy Plaza. Bryant became non-profit in 1949 and offered its first master's program in 1969.

=== College Hill ===
From August 1, 1935, to 1971, Bryant College of Business Administration campus was located on College Hill near Brown University. Housed first at "South Hall" at the corner of Hope Street and Young Orchard Avenue, formerly Hope Hospital, the college expanded into neighboring buildings. The "South Hall" building was originally the 19th-century home of Byron Sprague, a nephew of manufacturer William Sprague III, and later the home of Isaac Gifford Ladd. When the school relocated to Smithfield, it sold the Providence campus to Brown University. The property, 26 buildings on 10 acres of land, became known as Brown's East Campus. The former South Hall became home to Brown's music department, and is now called the Orwig Music Center.

=== Smithfield ===
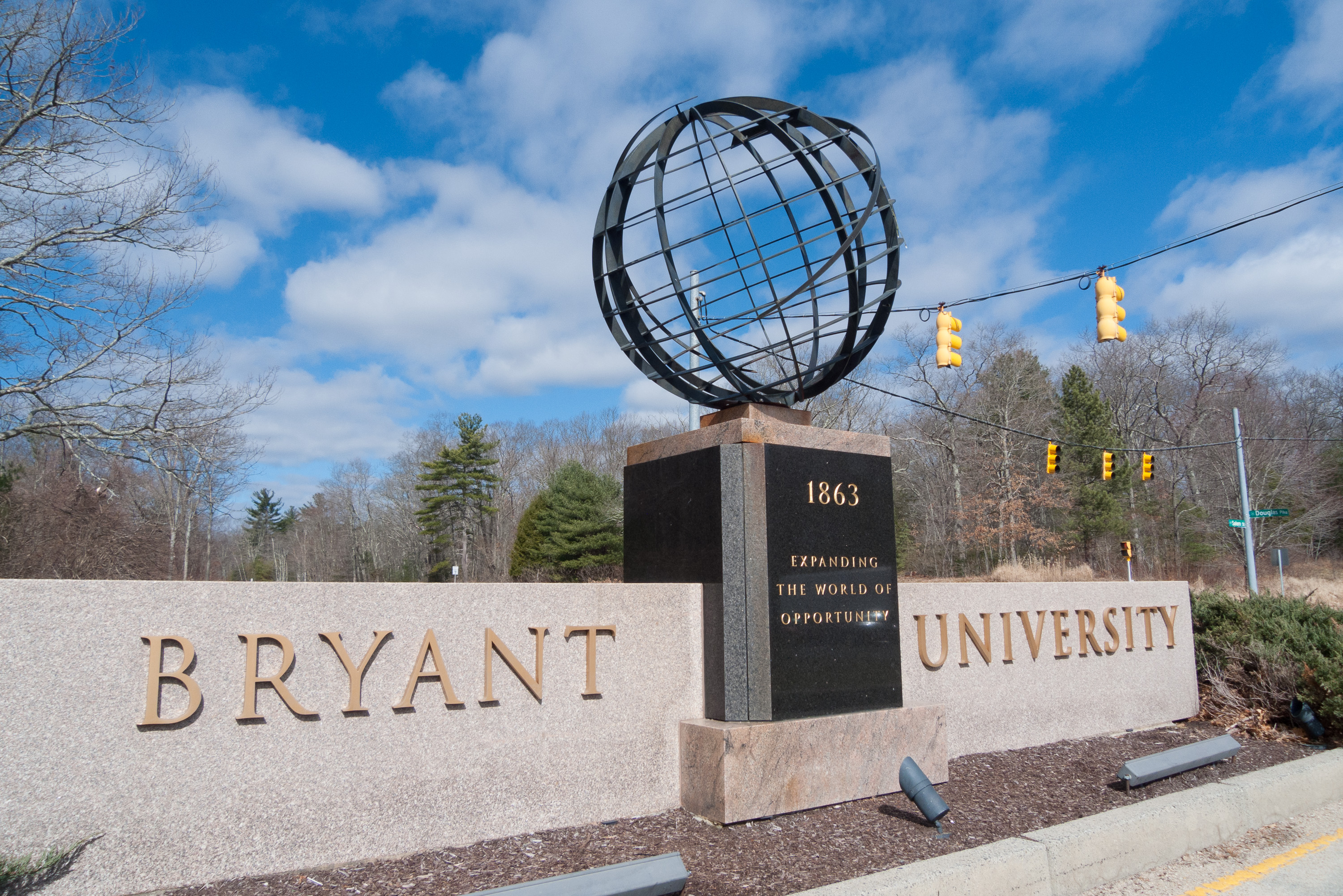
Entrance to Bryant University's Smithfield campus

In October 1967, Earl S. Tupper, alumnus and inventor of Tupperware, donated his 428-acre (1.73 km^{2}) hillside estate to Bryant College for the creation of the new campus. To thank Tupper, Bryant named the campus after him and awarded him a second degree, an honorary Ph.D. in Humane Letters. In 1971, the university moved to the new campus. The famous Bryant Archway was also relocated. The old Emin Homestead and Captain Joseph Mowry homestead occupied much of the land that makes up the present day Smithfield campus. The land was purchased and farmed for three generations between the late 19th century and the mid-20th century. Today, many descendants of the original Emin settlers still live near the Bryant campus. The school also claims a handful of family members as alumni and offers a scholarship for accounting students as a tribute to the Emin family. Historical pictures of the Emin Homestead can still be found in the Alumni house.

=== Bryant Archway tradition ===
Students at Bryant have a particular way of symbolizing the completion of their education: walking through the archway. In 1875, Isaac Gifford Ladd, an associate of Charles M. Schwab and a famous U.S. steel tycoon, constructed a one million dollar building which contained the iron arch on Young Orchard Avenue on the east side of Providence. This building was meant to be a sign of his endearment to his newlywed wife.

However, his wife expressed hatred for the structure which was named after her. He took this as a personal rejection, and Ladd later took his own life. The building remained unoccupied until Thomas Marsden transformed it into Hope Hospital, which was part of Bryant College. To provide more space for classes, an addition was constructed and Hope Hospital was renamed South Hall. Four years later, prior to the school's move from Providence to Smithfield, the wrought-iron arch at the entrance to South Hall was transported to the new campus.

Today, the archway remains the only physical link to the Providence campus. After the archway was transferred from the old campus, students immediately began to avoid passing through this out-of-place structure. As a rumor had it, walking through the archway before graduation mysteriously jeopardized chances of graduating. Since this is quite a large price to pay for not following tradition, most students opted not to take the chance, which has resulted in worn paths around the arch.

=== Archway seal ===
The Bryant Seal represents the educational mission of the university and its worldwide implications. The central symbol is an ellipsoid globe with quills on each side to signify the traditional emblem of communication in business. In the center, behind the globe, is a torch symbolizing liberty, the spirit of free inquiry, academic freedom, and learning. The Archway, forming the background for the globe, torch, and quills, is a university landmark affectionately and superstitiously by Bryant alumni. The Latin motto expresses the purpose of the university: "Cognitio. Virtus. Successus." – Which means Knowledge. Character. Success. The original Latin motto has remained unchanged and has been translated into the university's current day motto which is The Character of Success.

=== Presidents ===
Ross Gittell is the ninth president of Bryant University.

1. Theodore Stowell, 1878–1916
2. Henry L. Jacobs, 1916–1961
3. E. Gardner Jacobs, 1961–1970
4. Schyler Hosler, 1969–1970
5. Harry F. Everts, 1970–1976
6. William T. O'Hara, 1976–1989
7. William E. Trueheart, 1989–1996
8. Ronald K. Machtley, 1996–2020
9. Ross Gitell, 2020–present

=== Machtley era ===
Ronald K. Machtley, a former Navy captain and U.S. Representative, was hired as president in 1996. When Machtley arrived he immediately began working with faculty, students and the board of trustees to ensure the future of Bryant. He announced an ambitious capital campaign and plans to build new facilities and upgrade old ones. Under the Machtley administration, Bryant has built a new library, athletic center, communications and IT complex, residence hall, interfaith center, upgraded all athletic fields, and completely renovated the main classroom building and the student union. The school also changed its name to Bryant University in 2004. Its selectivity has increased, and the days of budget deficits are gone. The university endowment in 2007 totaled $171 million, a net increase of $169 million in just 10 years.

On Thursday, February 28, 2008, former U.S. President Bill Clinton campaigned at Bryant University in support of Hillary Clinton's bid for the Democratic presidential nomination. This was the first time in the school's history that either a former U.S. president or presidential candidate came to Bryant University to give a speech. Also in 2008, the 41st president of the United States George H. W. Bush gave the 2008 commencement address on May 17, 2008. Bush received an honorary degree from the university. Within only three months of each other, Bryant had two of the only three former U.S. Presidents still living come to speak on campus.

== Campus buildings ==
=== George E. Bello Center for Information and Technology ===
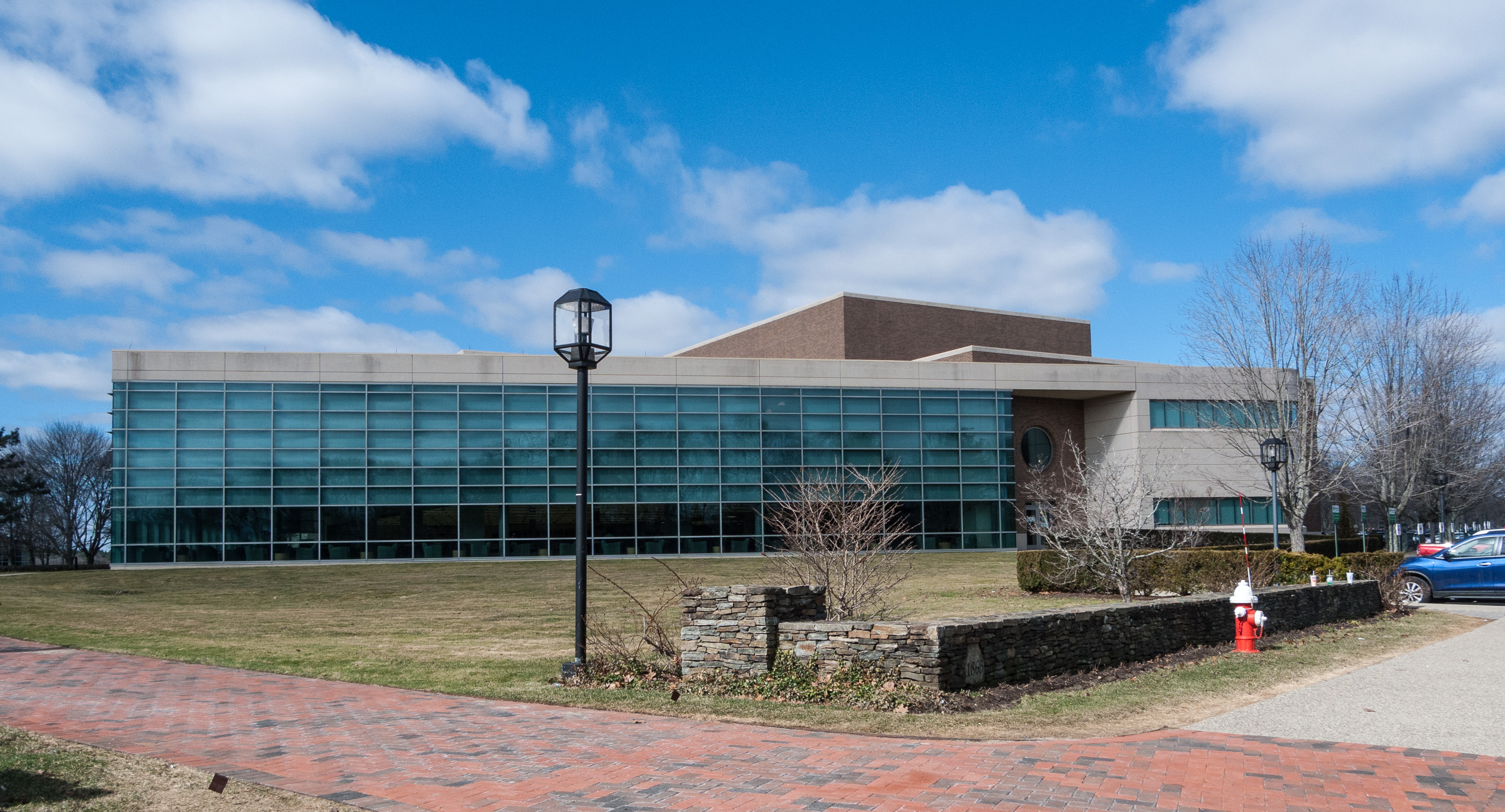
Bello Center

This 71,000-square-foot (6,600 m^{2}) building houses the college library, previously located in the Unistructure.

The George E. Bello Center for Information and Technology was designed by Gwathmey Siegel & Associates Architects, a firm in New York City that has been nationally recognized for its design of the Science, Industry, & Business Library (SIBL) for the New York Public Library.

=== Unistructure ===
The Unistructure is a large centrally located building on Bryant University's campus. It was designed in 1969 by Robert Hillier. It is now home to the university's College of Humanities and Social Sciences and College of Health and Behavioral Sciences.

=== Michael E. '67 and Karen L. Fisher Student Center ===
The Fisher Student Center (known as the Bryant Center until September 2013) offers offices and meeting spaces for a wide variety of co-curricular activities, clubs and student organizations.

=== Koffler Communications Complex ===
Front of the Koffler Center

The Koffler Technology Center is Bryant's computer center. More than 200 terminals, microcomputers, and workstations are located here. Facilities offer individual workstations for hands-on learning and shared workstations for group projects.

The Koffler center is also home to the university's TV and radio stations. WJMF takes up most of the main floor, sharing space with the TV/Editing studio.

=== John H. Chafee Center for International Business ===
The building was named after the late Rhode Island Senator John Chafee. The center serves the regional business community, as well as offering hands on opportunities for students to learn about global business. The Chafee Center houses the World Trade Center and Export Assistance Center for the state of Rhode Island.

=== Suite Village ===
The Suite Village is a collection of fourteen residence halls with thirteen of them (Charlestown, Richmond, Kilcup, Westerly, Hopkinton, Exeter, Coventry, Scituate, Tiverton, Providence, Jamestown, Cumberland and Lincoln) housing 90 students. The last and the newest, hall seventeen (Newport House), houses approximately 200 students. Every suite has three double bedrooms, a living area and private bathroom with multiple stalls and showers. Each of the four floors has four suites, with each suite separated by gender.

=== First Year Complex ===
These three halls (Warren, Bristol and Barrington) – are entirely reserved for first-year students – are four-story, co-educational halls with north and south wings.

=== Ronald K. and Kati C. Machtley Interfaith Center ===
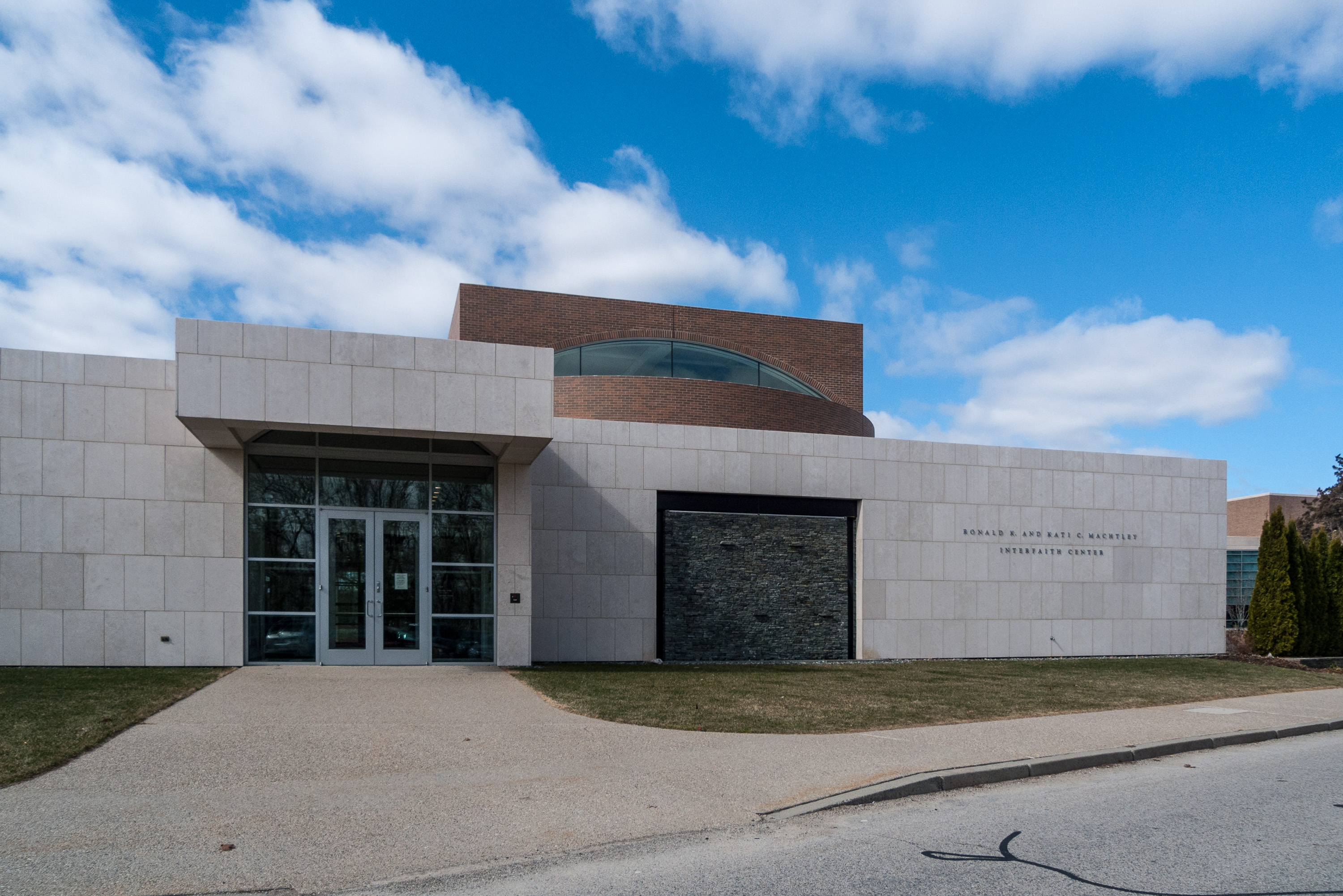
Interfaith Center

The Interfaith Center opened at the start of the 2009–2010 academic year to replace the previous chapel in the Bryant Center. Located between the Bryant Center and the George E. Bello Center for Information and Technology, it is an 11,000-square-foot (1,000 m^{2}) non-denominational place of worship and reflection for all members of the campus community. The center, designed by Gwathmey Siegel & Associates Architects, a firm in New York City that has been nationally recognized for its work, has received two design awards: a 2010 Honor Design Award from Faith & Form magazine/The Interfaith Forum on Religion, Art and Architecture, and a Building of America Award from Construction Communications magazine for the center's use of sustainable materials.

On October 9, 2010, the board of trustees honored President Ronald K. Machtley and his wife Kati C. Machtley by dedicating the Interfaith Center in their names.

=== Salmanson Dining Hall ===
Salmanson Dining Hall, inside the Unistructure, was named after Leonard I. Salmanson in 1973. Prior to this time, it was said that Salmanson made one donation which was one of the largest Bryant had ever received up until this time. Bryant awarded Salmanson an honorary degree of Doctor of Science of Business Administration in 1972 and he became a Bryant trustee in 1974.

=== Academic Innovation Center ===
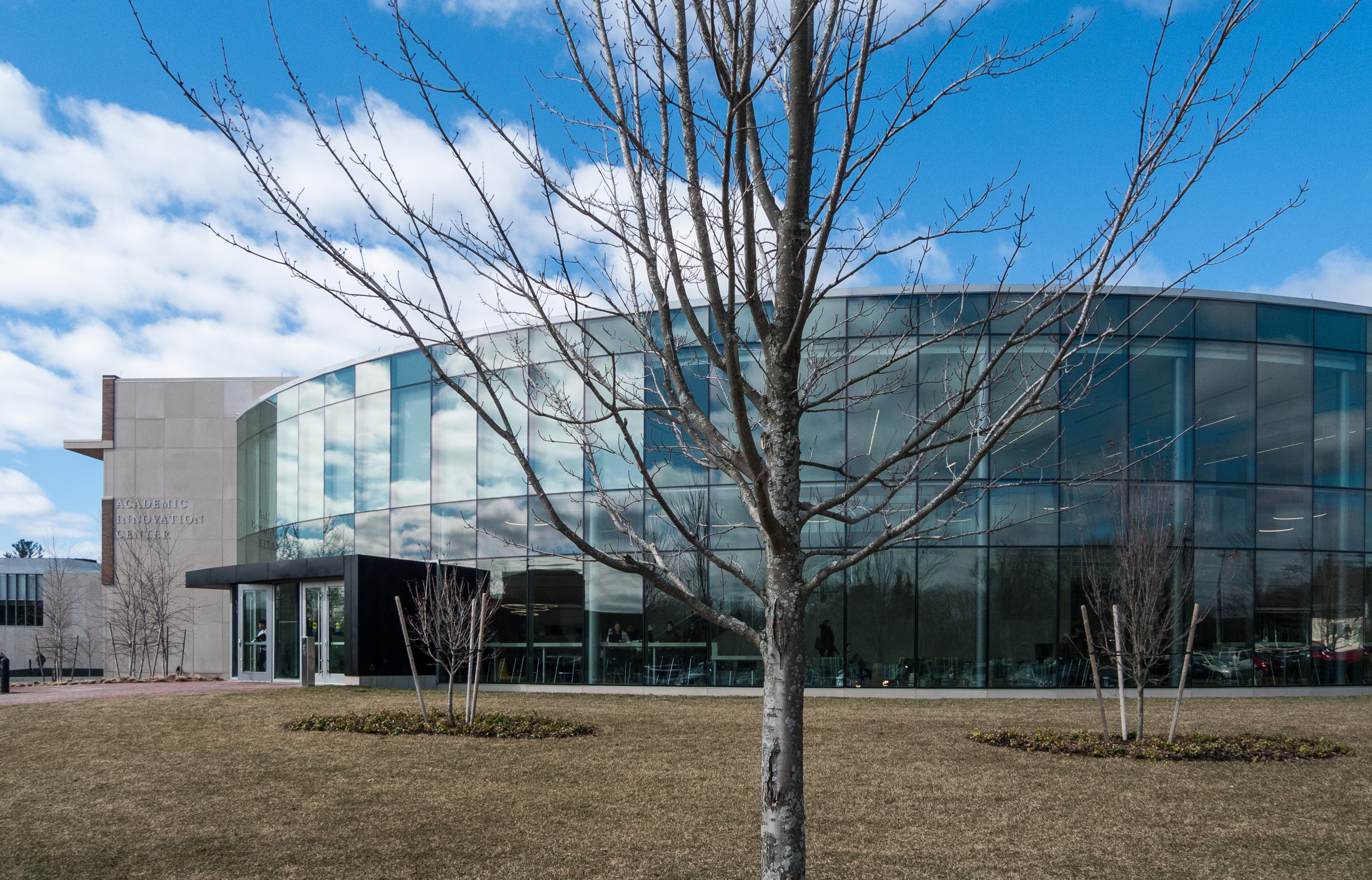
Academic Innovation Center

The Academic Innovation Center is a 50,000-square-foot building housing classrooms, breakout rooms, an innovation forum, admission greeting center, and cafe.

=== Bulldog Strength & Conditioning Center ===
The 10,000-square-foot Bulldog Strength & Conditioning Center is used by students who are members of the Bulldog Division I and club sports athletic teams.

=== Business Entrepreneurship Leadership Center ===
The Business Entrepreneurship Leadership Center (BELC) is a 250,000 square feet (23,000 m^{2}) facility donated to the university by Fidelity Investments in 2022.

== Residence life ==
Bryant residence life guarantees housing for all four years. Bryant also has a strict drug policy, which involves the Smithfield Police Department in all cases of violations. In 2010, Smithfield Police arrested 34 Bryant students for possession of marijuana. This placed the school at number 4 on The Daily Beast's 2011 list of druggiest colleges. In 2010, the school placed at number 2 on the list. The university "unequivocally" rejected the characterization, called The Daily Beast's representations "without foundation," and considered the methodology "badly flawed."

== Academics ==
=== Schools and programs ===
Bryant University is divided into two colleges: the College of Business and the College of Arts and Sciences. Each offers undergraduate and graduate degrees. Most students are enrolled in a business discipline.

All students in a business administration major are required to complete one of the 27 liberal arts minors. Students in the Bachelor of Science in International Business program are required to complete a language minor. All students majoring in the College of Arts and Sciences also complete a business minor.

=== Centers and institutes ===
- Advanced Applied Analytics Center
- John H. Chafee Center for International Business
- Hassenfeld Institute for Public Leadership
- Center for Global and Regional Economic Studies
- Center for Program Innovation
- U.S.-China Institute and Confucius Institute
- Amica Center for Career Education
- Executive Development Center
- Center for Teaching and Learning

=== Reputation and rankings ===
- In 2017, Bryant University President Ronald K. Machtley was the highest paid college president in the United States. At $6,283,616, Machtley was paid $920,000 more than the second highest paid college president.
- Tier One MBA program – CEO Magazine 2016
- #1 in Digital Marketing Program in the U.S. - College Factual's 2022 Rankings

In the 2022 U.S. News & World Report College Rankings, Bryant was ranked #7 in the Regional-North group.

== Athletics ==
Bryant has 25 intercollegiate varsity athletic programs and participates in NCAA Division I as a member of the America East Conference. Athletic squads are called the Bulldogs. In addition, students can compete in various club sports and on intramural teams throughout the academic year.

Bryant has 11 varsity teams for men and 14 for women: baseball, basketball, cross country, American football, golf, lacrosse, indoor and outdoor track and field, tennis, soccer, and swimming and diving. The women's teams consist of basketball, bowling, cross country, field hockey, golf, lacrosse, indoor and outdoor track and field, rowing, soccer, softball, swimming and diving, tennis, and volleyball.

Bryant University also offers sports at the club level. They offer 20 club level sports teams, 10 for men and 10 for women. The men's club sports are: bowling, hockey, karate, racquetball, crew, rugby, skiing and snowboarding, ultimate frisbee, wrestling, and volleyball. The women's club sports include bowling, cheerleading, gymnastics, hockey, karate, ice skating, racquetball, rugby, skiing and snowboarding, and dance.

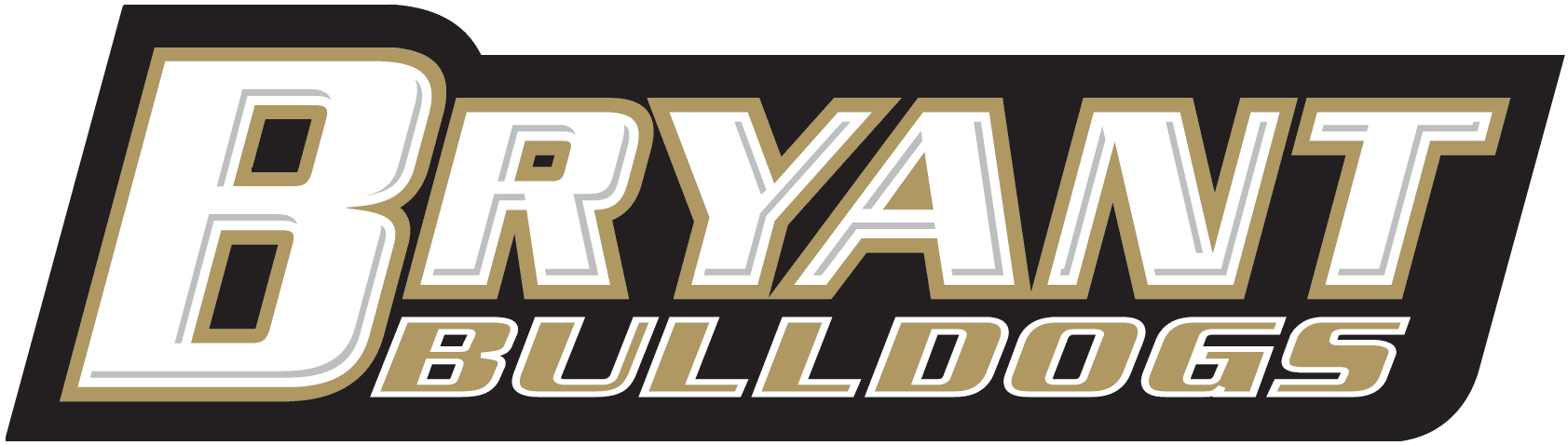
The Bryant Bulldogs

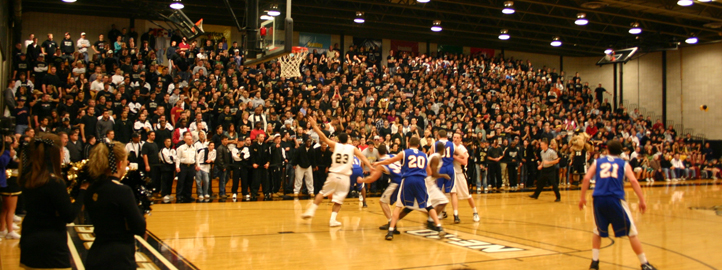
Sellout crowd at #25 Bryant University vs. #2 Bentley College on February 3, 2007 (2,770 in attendance).

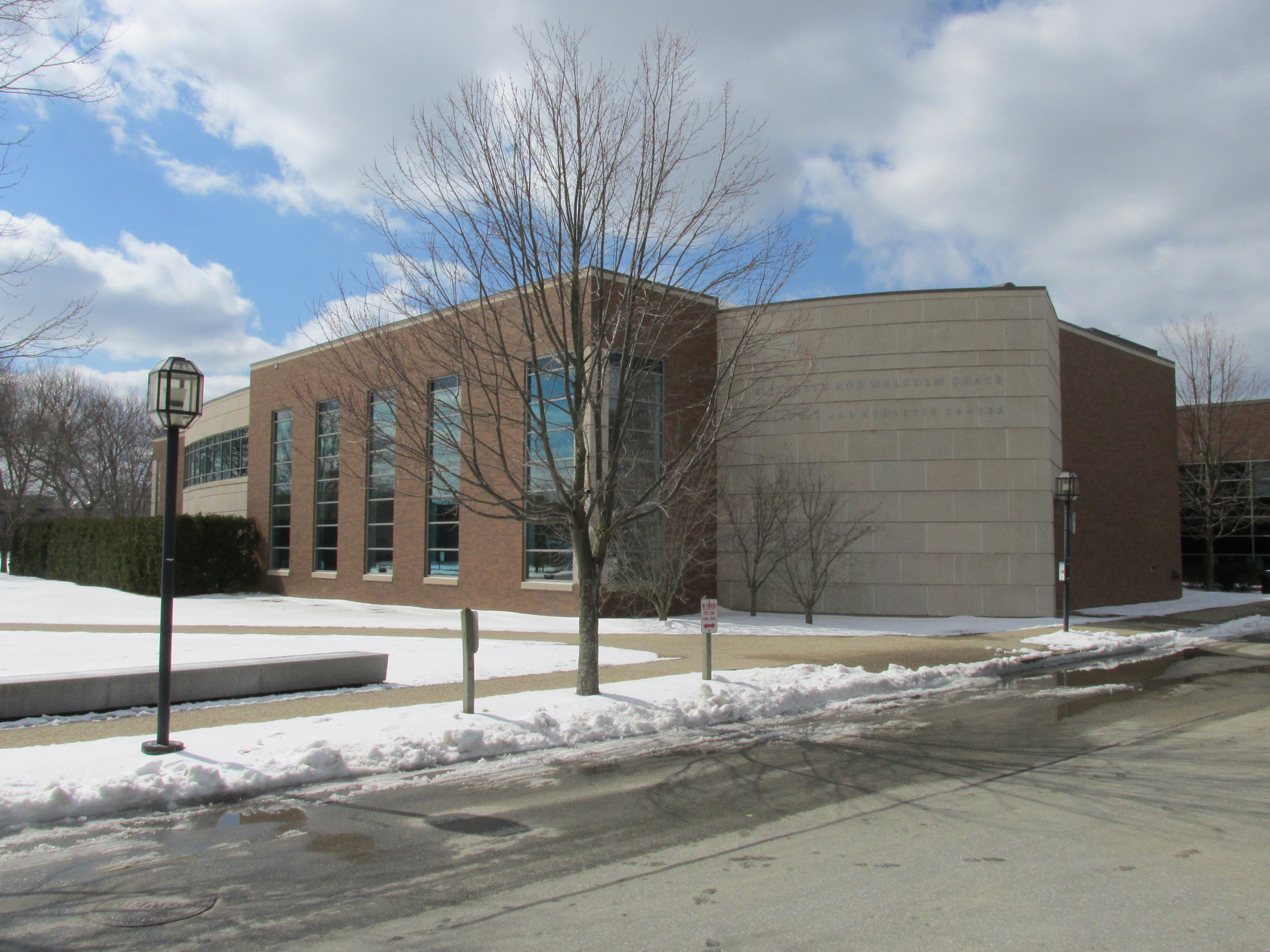
Bryant's Chace Athletic Center

== Greek life ==
Bryant University has Greek life on campus. While Bryant does not allow Greek housing, Charlestown House is made up exclusively of students involved in Greek life.

== Student life ==
Student body composition as of May 2, 2022
Race and ethnicity	Total
White	76%
Hispanic	7%
Foreign national	5%
Black	4%
Asian	4%
Other (Note: Other consists of Multiracial Americans & those who prefer to not say.)	3%
Economic diversity
Low-income (Note: The percentage of students who received an income-based federal Pell grant intended for low-income students.)	11%
Affluent (Note: The percentage of students who are a part of the American middle class at the bare minimum.)	89%

=== Student media ===
- The Archway (newspaper)
- TV Production Club
- WJMF 88.7 HD-2 Radio Station
