= Michael Ingham =

Michael Ingham may refer to:

- Michael Ingham (bishop) (born 1949), English-Canadian bishop
- Michael Ingham (footballer) (born 1980), English-born Northern Irish footballer
- Michael Ingham (cricketer) (born 1957), English cricketer
- Mike Ingham (born 1950), English football commentator
