= Peter Ingham =

Peter Ingham may refer to:

- Peter Ingham (bishop) (1941–2024), Australian bishop
- Peter Ingham (cricketer) (born 1956), English cricketer
- Peter Ingham (character), character in British television series The Story of Tracy Beaker

== See also ==
- Peter Ingram (born 1978), New Zealand cricketer
- Peter Ingram (cricketer, born 1869), Scottish cricketer
