= Henry Dwight Stratton =

Henry Stratton, brother-in-law of John Bryant, co-founder of the school

Henry Dwight Stratton (1824–1867) was an author and co-founder and namesake of Bryant & Stratton College.

Henry Dwight Stratton was born on August 24, 1824, in Amherst, Ohio, and attended the public schools in Amherst and then attended Oberlin College. He married Parmella Bryant in 1854 in Cleveland in a double wedding ceremony with his sister and brother-in-law Henry B. Bryant. The wedding was officiated by Dr. Charles Finney, a Protestant minister who was the president of Oberlin College. Along with his brothers-in-law, John Collins Bryant, and Henry Beadman Bryant, Stratton graduated from Folsom Business College in Cleveland, Ohio. The trio later purchased the school from the owner, Ezekiel G. Folsom, who founded his school in 1848. Bryant & Stratton College was officially organized in 1854 to provide practical workplace education, and was formerly known as Bryant and Stratton Business Institute. In addition to purchasing the Cleveland school, Bryant and Stratton established a number of business schools that operated under the name of Bryant & Stratton & Co's chain of International Commercial Colleges in most major US cities. By 1864 as many as 50 schools existed. Stratton died on February 20, 1867, in New York City.
