= William Logan Harris =

American bishop (1817–1887)

- Elected: 1872

Personal details
- Born: November 4, 1817 Ontario, Richland County, Ohio
- Died: September 2, 1887 (aged 69) New York, New York
- Denomination: Methodist Episcopal Church
- Parents: James and Mary (Logan) Harris
- Spouse: Nancy Jane Atwell (m. 1840)
- Children: Mary Celestina, Hattie Augusta, and William Hamilton
- Education: Norwalk Seminary

William Logan Harris (November 4, 1817 – September 2, 1887) was an American bishop of the Methodist Episcopal Church, elected in 1872.

== Birth and family ==
Harris was born near Ontario in Richland County, Ohio, a son of James and Mary (Logan) Harris. His father died when William was sixteen years old. William then made his home for some time with his uncle and guardian, Stephen Harris, (who was a brother of the Honorable John Harris of Stark County, Ohio).

Harris married Nancy Jane Atwell August 9, 1840. They had three children: Mary Celestina, Hattie Augusta, and William Hamilton (who married Grace Fancher Nicoll December 1, 1885).

== Education ==
Harris attended the schools near his home. He was converted to the Christian faith June 10, 1834. He entered the Norwalk Seminary (Norwalk, Ohio) shortly thereafter, pursuing a course of classical and mathematical studies.

== Honorary degrees ==
Harris was honored by Allegheny College with the D.D. degree in 1856. He received an honorary LL.D. degree in 1870 from Baldwin University.

== Ordained ministry ==
Harris united with the M.E. Church in 1834, and was licensed to preach in the early part of 1837. He was admitted on trial to the Michigan Annual Conference (which at that time covered northwestern Ohio as well) 7 September 1837. In 1840 he became a founding member of the North Ohio Annual Conference. When the conference boundaries were further realigned, he became a member of the Central Ohio Conference (aka the Delaware Ohio Conference).

Harris served in Ohio for eight years as pastor at, successively, Dover, Bellville, Amity, and Chesterville, and in 1844 was appointed to Delaware, Ohio. He also was an active abolitionist. In the time preceding the American Civil War, he took part in the discussion, writing books, pamphlets, etc. on this subject.

== Academic ministry ==
Harris became a tutor (or instructor) at Ohio Wesleyan University, Delaware, Ohio, in 1845. In 1846–47 he again entered pastoral work, appointed to Toledo. In 1848 he was assigned to Norwalk, Ohio. He was then elected principal of the Baldwin Institute (later University), Berea, Ohio, remaining there from 1848 to 1851. In 1852 Harris was elected professor of chemistry and natural history at Ohio Wesleyan, serving in this position for eight years.

== Other ministry pursuits ==
In 1860 Harris was elected by the General Conference one of the Corresponding Secretaries of the Missionary Society of the M.E. Church, which office he held by quadrennial re-elections until his election to the episcopacy.

Harris was elected a delegate to the General Conferences of 1856–72, serving as secretary of that body at each of these quadrennial sessions. He also contributed largely to the periodical literature of his denomination.

== Episcopal ministry ==
Harris was elected to the episcopacy of the M.E. Church by the General Conference of 1872, which met in Brooklyn, New York. Then during 1872–73, Harris made the first official episcopal tour ever made circumnavigating the globe (leaving from San Francisco), visiting M.E. mission stations in Japan, China, India, Bulgaria, and Western Europe. Harris also became recognized as an expert in Methodist church law.

== Death and burial ==
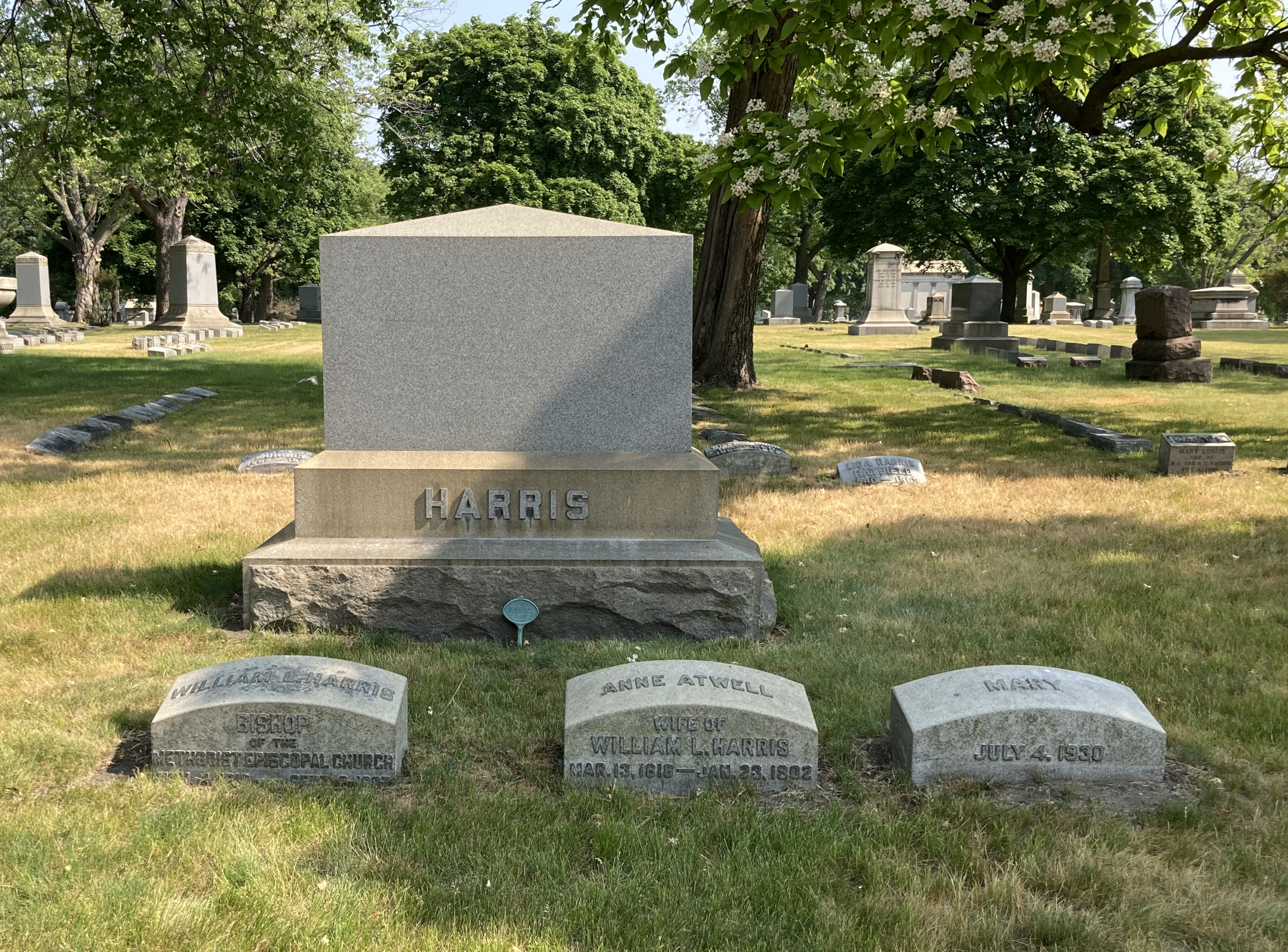
Harris's grave at Rosehill Cemetery

Harris experienced symptoms of heart disease, being indisposed during an 1887 trip to England. Upon his return to New York he was unable to walk, and he died September 2, 1887, at his residence in New York City. He was buried in Rosehill Cemetery, Chicago.

== Selected writings ==
- The Powers of the General Conference, 1859.
- Ecclesiastical Law and Rules of Evidence, written with Judge William J. Henry (of Illinois), with special reference to the government of the M.E. Church, 1870.

== See also ==
- List of bishops of the United Methodist Church
