= Gregory Dell'Omo =

7th president of Rider University

Gregory G. Dell'Omo is the seventh president of Rider University. He assumed office on August 1, 2015, succeeding Mordechai Rozanski.

== Biography ==
Dell'Omo received a Bachelor of Arts in economics from Montclair State University, a Master of Science in industrial relations from Rutgers University and a Ph.D. in industrial relations/human resource management from the University of Wisconsin-Madison.

Dell'Omo began his academic career at Canisius College as an assistant professor. He then joined Saint Joseph's University where he was a professor of management and also held a sequence of academic and administrative positions, including Dean of the Haub School of Business, Associate Vice President for Academic Affairs and Vice President for External Affairs. Prior to assuming presidency at Rider, Dell'Omo served for ten years as the seventh president of Robert Morris University.

Dell’Omo oversaw the controversial relocation of Westminster Choir College of Rider University from its Princeton campus to Rider's main campus in Lawrenceville. The relocation and residual interest in the Princeton campus are matters currently being litigated, with alumni, faculty, and the Princeton Theological seminary as plaintiffs.

Dell'Omo has twice been named in motions of no confidence by the university's faculty. The initial vote of no confidence in 2017 cited 'rash actions' and an authoritarian leadership style, and called for him to regain the confidence of the faculty. The second vote in February 2022 calls specifically for his removal by the board of trustees, citing that his policies "...have seriously eroded Rider's financial position, reducing net income by $6 million, increasing non-teaching expenses by $8 million between 2015 and 2019 (pre-pandemic) while significantly increasing Rider's debt, in a time period where peer institutions in Rider's market experienced increased enrollment and net revenue.” The full motion also references the 'near-destruction of Westminster Choir College' as well as a failure of the administration to meet "important benchmarks of the University's strategic plan as approved by the Board of Trustees", as well as other issues.

In September of 2024, Rider University announced that Dell'Omo would be retiring at the end of his contract in July, 2025.

The Rider University Board of Trustees extended Dell'Omo's Presidency through July 31, 2025, despite widespread concern regarding his leadership and competence as the university weathers lowered enrollments, numerous faculty and staff departures, and expensive legal and consulting firm fees. David Dewberry, then-President of the Rider University chapter of the American Association of University Professors, said in response to Dell'Omo's extension that "...the board is unwavering in its support of the president's leadership, it's clear faculty and staff are not.”

On September 10, 2024, Rider University announced that Dell'Omo would retire on July 31, 2025. Quinn Cunningham, President of the Rider University chapter of the American Association of University Professors, said regarding the announcement that "It’s a little bit of a relief in that the faculty have been sort of begging for change for a while now ... Unfortunately, the 2015 layoffs immediately broke trust between the faculty and Dell'Omo.”

In 2021, Dell'Omo was elected to the board of directors of the National Association of Independent Colleges and Universities (NAICU) to represent the region that includes New Jersey, Delaware, District of Columbia, Maryland and New York.
