= Norwalk Seminary =

19th century private school in Norwalk, Ohio, United States

Norwalk Seminary was a private, Methodist school in Norwalk, Ohio. Opening in 1838 with Edward Thomson as principal, by 1842 it had an attendance of nearly four hundred. Nonetheless, the school was unsuccessful financially, and it was forced to close in 1844. In 1846, a Baptist church purchased the building and re-opened it under the name Norwalk Institute. There were about three hundred students when, in 1855, the school was transferred to the Ohio public school system. Renamed again as Central High School, the building continued to be used as a public school until 1868, when a new structure replaced it.

== Notable alumni ==
- Henry Beadman Bryant
- William Logan Harris
- Rutherford B. Hayes, President of the United States
- Mary Bigelow Ingham, educator, writer, social reformer
- George E. Seney
- Orville James Victor, writer and editor

== Sources ==
- Upton, Harriet Taylor & Cutler, Harry Gardner (1910). History of the Western Reserve. Vol. 1. The Lewis Publishing Company. p. 432.
