= Craig Ingham =

New Zealand cricketer (born 1964)

Personal information
- Full name: Craig Donald Ingham
- Born: 26 July 1964 (age 62); Nelson, New Zealand

Domestic team information
- Years: Team
- 1986/87–1995/96: Nelson
- 1990/91–1994/95: Central Districts
- Source: CricketArchive, 4 October 2024

Craig Donald Ingham (born 26 July 1965) is a New Zealand former cricketer who played for Central Districts. He was born at Nelson and played for the Nelson representative side in the Hawke Cup.
