= Henry Beadman Bryant =

Henry Beadman Bryant

Henry Beadman Bryant (1824–1892) was an author and co-founder and namesake of Bryant & Stratton College and Bryant University in Smithfield, Rhode Island.

Henry B. Bryant was born in Gloucestershire, England on April 5, 1824 and was the youngest son of six children. His father, John Bryant, was a farmer who brought the family to Ohio to a farm near a Native American settlement. Bryant's first education was during the winters in a log school house, and while at home he worked on the family farm during the rest of the year. He then attended the Norwalk Seminary, a Methodist school, and began teaching school before entering college in Cleveland. He married Lucy A. Stratton in 1854 in Cleveland in a double wedding ceremony with his sister and brother-in-law Henry Stratton. The wedding was officiated by Dr. Charles Finney, a Protestant minister who was the president of Oberlin College. The Bryants had three children. Along with his brother, John Collins Bryant, and his brother-in-law, Henry Dwight Stratton, Bryant graduated from Folsom Business College in Cleveland, Ohio. The trio later purchased the school from the owner, Ezekiel G. Folsom, who founded his school in 1848. Bryant & Stratton College was officially organized in 1854 to provide practical workplace education, and was formerly known as Bryant and Stratton Business Institute. In addition to purchasing the Cleveland school, Bryant and Stratton established a number of business schools that operated under the name of Bryant & Stratton & Co's chain of International Commercial Colleges in most major US cities. By 1864 as many as 50 schools existed. After the death of Mr. Stratton in 1867, the brothers sold most of the schools except the ones in Chicago and Buffalo. Henry Bryant led the one in Chicago and his brother, John, led the school in Buffalo, New York. Bryant died in 1892.
