= Michael Ingham (cricketer) =

English cricketer (born 1957)

Michael Ingham (born 20 February 1957) was an English cricketer. He was a right-handed batsman who played for Cumberland.

Ingham made his cricketing debut for Haslingden in the Lancashire League in the 1974 season, and played for the team most recently during the 2008 season.

Ingham played Minor Counties Championship for Cumberland between 1993 and 1996, and made his only List A appearance for the side during the 1996 season, against Middlesex. From the upper-middle order, he scored 13 runs.

Ingham's father, John, played for Haslingden between 1946 and 1981, and was part of the Worsley Cup winning side of 1977, while his son, Lee, plays for Haslingden as of 2009.
