= Mary Bigelow Ingham =

American author, educator and religious worker

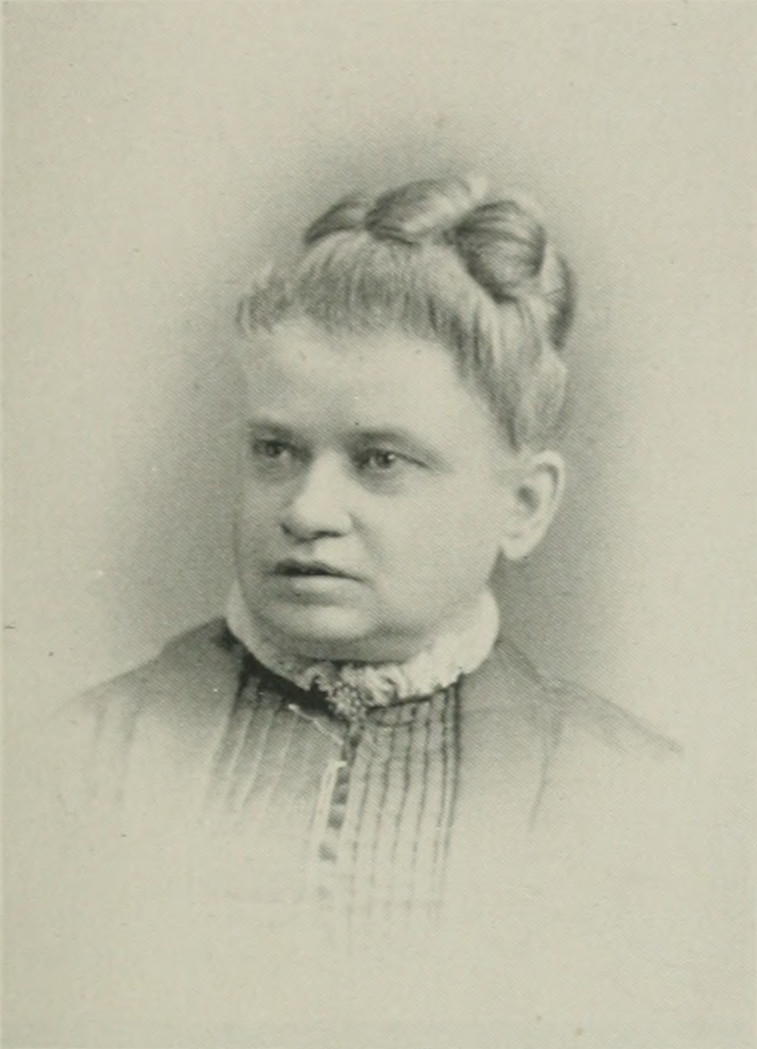
- Portrait from "A Woman of the Century"
- Born: Mary Bigelow Janes; March 10, 1832; Mansfield, Ohio, U.S.
- Died: November 17, 1923 (aged 91)
- Education: Norwalk Seminary; Baldwin Institute; Ohio Wesleyan College
- Occupations: author, educator, and religious worker
- Spouse: William A. Ingham (m. 1866; died 1898)
- Writing career
- Pen name: Anne Hathaway
- Language: English
- Notable works: Women of Cleveland and their work

Mary Bigelow Ingham (née, Janes; pen name, Anne Hathaway; March 10, 1832 - 17 November 1923) was an American author, educator, and religious worker who was dedicated to teaching, missionary work, and temperance reform. She served as professor of French and belles-lettres in the Ohio Wesleyan College. Ingham presided over and addressed the first public meeting ever held in Cleveland conducted exclusively by religious women. She co-founded the Western Reserve School of Design (later, Cleveland Institute of Art). Ingham was a charter member of the order of the Daughters of the American Revolution.

== Early life and education ==
Mary Bigelow Janes was born in Mansfield, Ohio, March 10, 1832. Her parents, of Revolutionary ancestry, were from Vermont. Her father, Rev. John Janes, Jr. was a pioneer Methodist Minister in Ohio and Michigan. He also owned a book store in Norwalk, Ohio on the site later occupied by the Norwalk National Bank, and the Avalon Hotel. Her mother, Hannah Brown, was one of the founders of the Methodist Episcopal Church in Ann Arbor, Michigan.

John Janes, Sr. (paternal grandfather), and Daniel Brown, Sr. (maternal grandfather), lived in Vermont; each was the father of 12 children. John Janes, Sr., emigrated to Delaware County, Ohio while Daniel Brown settled in Ann Arbor, Michigan Territory. John Janes, Jr., became a Methodist preacher, traveling Detroit Circuit. Two daughters of Daniel Brown, Sr., Rebecca and Hannah B., organized the nucleus of the First Methodist Episcopal Church of Ann Arbor, their father and brother Daniel aiding the establishment of Michigan University. John Janes, Jr. married Hannah B. Brown, their marriage occurring in May, 1828. In time, they became parents of five children, which included Mary B.; Eliza R. (died young); Emma, was a professor in Central California, later becoming a writer and journalist in Washington, D.C.; and Frank, who went into the railroads business.

As a very young child, Ingham was a pupil in Lizzie T. Higgins’ School. At nine years of age, she was placed in Latin Grammar School at the Seminary, which she attended with Mary Watrous, Mary Tuttle, and Mary Beardsley. Later on, Lawyer Curtis taught Ingham about Virgil at her home. Ingham also attended Norwalk Seminary and Baldwin Institute.

== Career ==
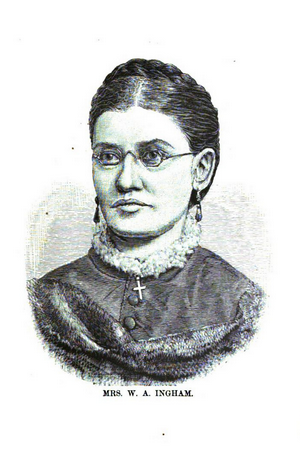
(1888 or earlier)

=== Educator ===
In 1850, at the age of 18, Ingham went to Cleveland, Ohio, as a teacher in the public schools. She served as assistant principal at Norwalk North Grammar School and Rockwell School of Cleveland. During a portion of the six years spent there, she boarded and studied in the family of Madame Pierre Gollier, learning to speak the French language fluently. Appointed professor of French and belles-lettres in the Ohio Wesleyan College for young ladies, in Delaware, Ohio, she applied herself to the study of German, adding thereto Spanish and Italian, and received from her alma mater the honorary degree of M. L. A. She retired from her teaching career in 1866.

=== Social and religious activist ===
On March 22, 1866, she married William A. Ingham (died 1898) and moved to Cleveland. In 1870, she was chosen to inaugurate in northern Ohio the work of the Woman's Foreign Missionary Society. She presided over and addressed the first public meeting ever held in the city of Cleveland conducted exclusively by religious women. Afterward, she addressed large audiences in the various cities of Ohio, in Baltimore, Washington, D.C., Buffalo, New York City, New Haven, and Minneapolis, upon the needs of the women of foreign lands. In March 1874, being in charge of the praying community of her own city, she led for six weeks a very successful temperance crusade and was among the most active of Cleveland women in establishing inns, reading rooms, and chapels. She became chairman of the Pearl Street Inn, which for seven years did great work in the evangelization of the masses in the 9th, 10th, and 11th wards of Cleveland. She was one of the original committee members in Chautauqua, New York that projected in August 1874 the formation of the National Woman's Christian Temperance Union. That organizing convention met in Ingham's city on November 18–20, 1874. Ingham served as treasurer of the national organization (1874–75), though she was primarily affiliated with the local chapter in Cleveland.

Ingham was one of the founders of the Western Reserve School of Design. She was a charter member of the order of the Daughters of the American Revolution, and also of the Cleveland Sorosis, modeled upon that of the New York Sorosis organization.

=== Writer ===
Writing was always a favorite pastime with Ingham. At age 10, her first article was published in the Norwalk "Reflector." While in Delaware, encouraged by Professor W. G. Williams, she wrote her first story, for which he gave her the subject, "Something to Come Home To," receiving for it US$15 from The Ladies' Repository. That was followed by other articles. For the Cleveland "Leader", she wrote letters from the United States and Europe. Her letters from Florida in 1882 contained very accurate descriptions of natural scenery in the land of flowers. In 1880, at the request of the management of the "Leader," she began, in a series of articles covering three years' space, the "History of Woman's Work in Cleveland since 1830." She included, besides the founding of the four churches and a review of the principal charities, sketches under the title of the "Women of Cleveland." Her pen name was "Anne Hathaway". In 1884, she wrote the history of the pioneer Methodist Episcopal Churches of Cleveland. In 1890, Ingham wrote her famous "Flag Festival", the third edition being adapted to Discovery Day.

== Personal life ==
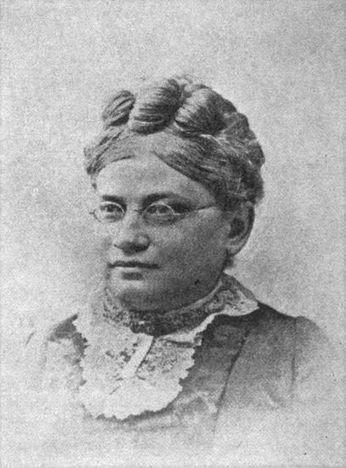
(1896)

Her husband, William, was a bookseller and the senior member of a Cleveland-based publishing business, Ingham & Bragg. It became Ingham, Clarke & Co. in 1872, and their son, P.M. Ingham, was a part of that house. She continued with her religious and missionary activities after relocation to Los Angeles in 1908 and died November 17, 1923.

== Selected works ==
- Women of Cleveland and their work : philanthropic, educational, literary, medical and artistic : a history in which more than one thousand people of Cleveland's past and present are mentioned as participants, 1893
