= Peter Ingham (cricketer) =

English cricketer (born 1956)

Peter Geoffrey Ingham (28 September 1956 in Sheffield, Yorkshire, England) is an English batsman, who made eight first-class appearances for Yorkshire County Cricket Club between 1979 and 1981, scoring 290 runs with a top score of 64, at an average of 20.71. In thirteen one-day games he averaged 45.85, with a top score of 87 not out. In cricket beneath first team level – namely Second XI and Under 25, Ingham scored over 1,000 runs for Yorkshire in 1979 and 1981.

Ingham won The Cricket Society Wetherall Award for the Leading All-Rounder in English Schools Cricket in 1974 and, after his time at Yorkshire finished, he played for Northumberland in the Minor Counties.
