= Bryant & Stratton College =

Private American college

- Type: Private college
- Established: 1854; 172 years ago
- Affiliations: USCAA
- President: David Vaden
- Campus: Buffalo, New York (main campus). Additional locations in New York, Ohio, Virginia, Wisconsin, and online
- Colors: Blue, Dark Blue, Light Blue
- Nickname: Bobcats
- Mascot: Blue
- Website: www.bryantstratton.edu

Bryant & Stratton College (informally Bryant & Stratton or simply BSC) is a private college with campuses in New York, Ohio, Virginia, and Wisconsin, as well as an online education division. Founded in 1854, the college offers associate degree and bachelor's degree programs. The college is approved by the New York State Board of Regents and accredited by the Middle States Commission on Higher Education.

== History ==
John Collins Bryant, Henry Beadman Bryant, and Henry Dwight Stratton were early graduates of Folsom Business College in Cleveland, Ohio, which they later purchased from the owner of the school, Ezekiel G. Folsom, who founded his school in 1848. Folsom was a former student of Platt Rogers Spencer who developed a standardized style of writing useful in business transactions before the invention of the typewriter.

Platt Spencer also played a role in the formation of Bryant & Stratton College, serving as a partner and teacher at the school which originally focused on bookkeeping and Spencerian penmanship. Bryant & Stratton College was organized in 1854 to provide practical workplace education, and was formerly known as Bryant & Stratton Business Institute.

In addition to purchasing the Cleveland school, Bryant and Stratton established a number of business schools that operated under the name of Bryant & Stratton Chain of Business Schools in most major US cities. By 1864, as many as 50 schools existed and tuition was $40 for an entire program of study. Today, there are schools across four states.

In 2015, Bryant & Stratton was put on a Heightened Cash Monitoring list by the federal government, to allow for a closer monitoring of their financial practices. This was followed that same year with legislation proposed by Senator Sherrod Brown to prevent for-profit colleges from using federal funds for marketing and advertising. WKYC noted in relation to this that US Department of Education statistics showed the college had a last place graduation rate of 6%.

In 2020, Bryant & Stratton College began pursuing a non-profit designation, as the college was previously a for-profit institution. Bryant H. Prentice III, a descendant of the college's founders, transferred his ownership of the college to a New York-based nonprofit corporation.

== Campuses ==
Campuses of Bryant & Stratton College are located in the following locations:

New York	Ohio	Virginia	Wisconsin
Albany	Akron	Hampton	Racine
Amherst	Parma	Richmond	Wauwatosa
Buffalo	Solon	Virginia Beach	
Greece			
Henrietta			
Liverpool			
Orchard Park			
Syracuse			

== Academics ==
Bryant & Stratton College offers diplomas, associate degrees, and bachelor's degrees in business, technology, hospitality, human and legal services, healthcare, nursing, education, and design. For the application year 2024, Bryant & Stratton had an overall acceptance rate of 92%. For the class of 2015 online students, the college had an online student retention rate of 14% (the percentage of students that stayed with the college) and a six year online graduation rate of 15%. The college is ranked as "unranked" by U.S. News & World Report.

== Athletics ==
Bryant & Stratton College offers multiple sports programs including: soccer, football, basketball, lacrosse, baseball, volleyball, and tennis. The school's sports team are the Bobcats.

== Gallery ==
Henry Beadman Bryant, brother of John Bryant, both co-founders of the school.

Henry Dwight Stratton, brother-in-law of John Bryant, also a co-founder of the school.

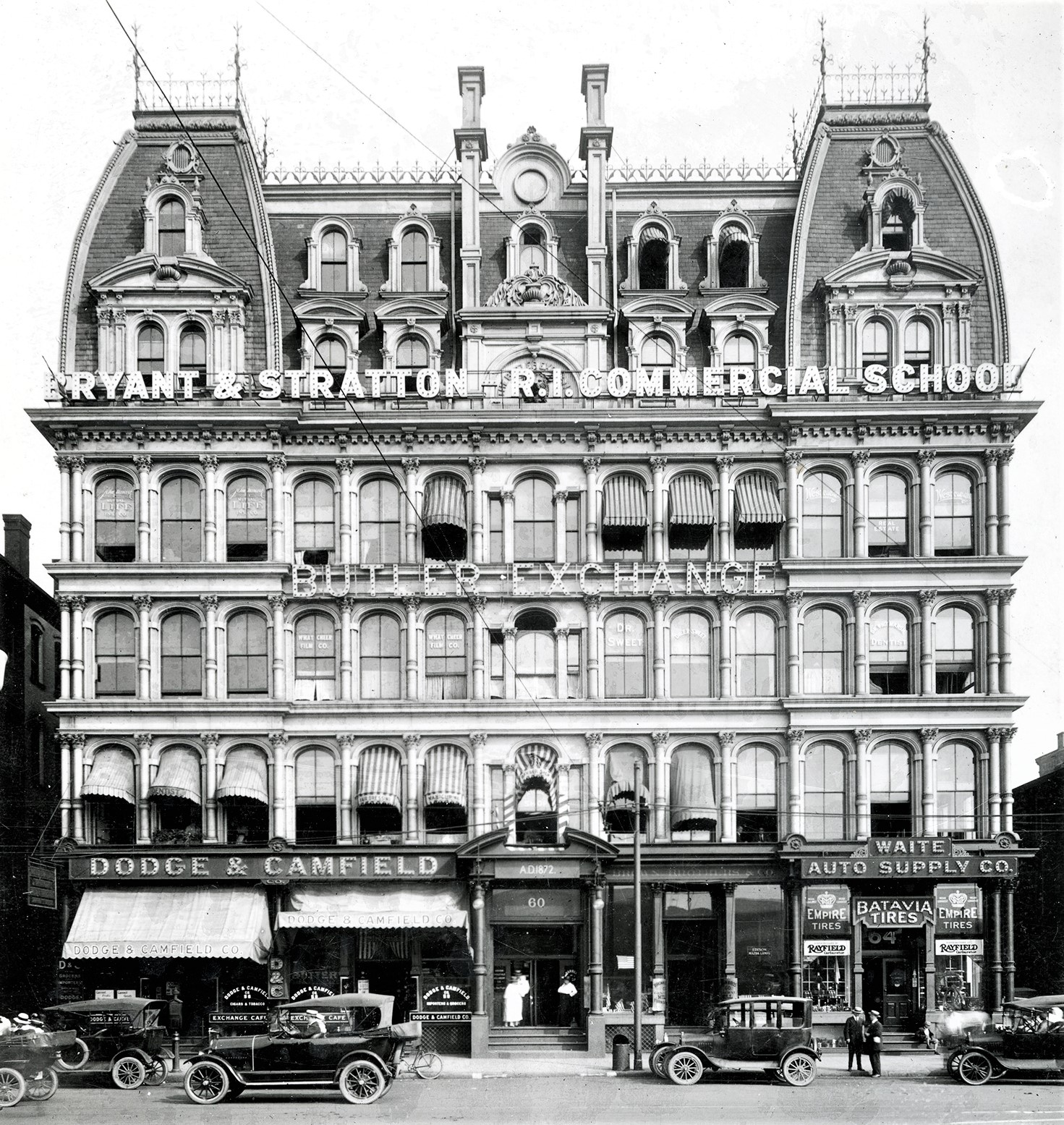
Historical campus building in Providence, RI with old Bryant & Stratton Commercial School sign.

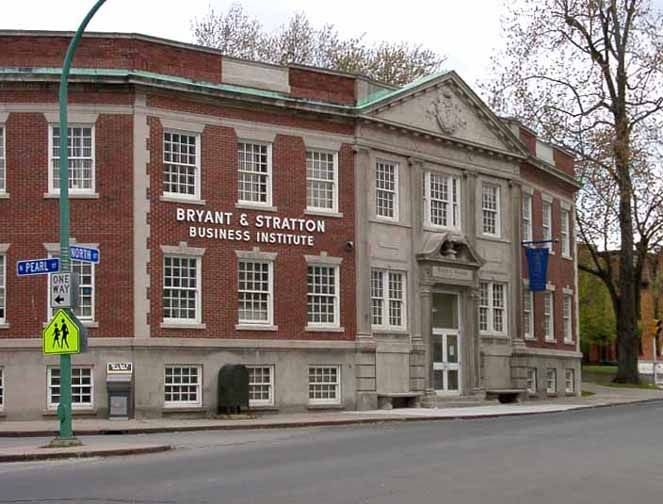
Historical campus building in Buffalo, NY with old Bryant & Stratton Business Institute sign.

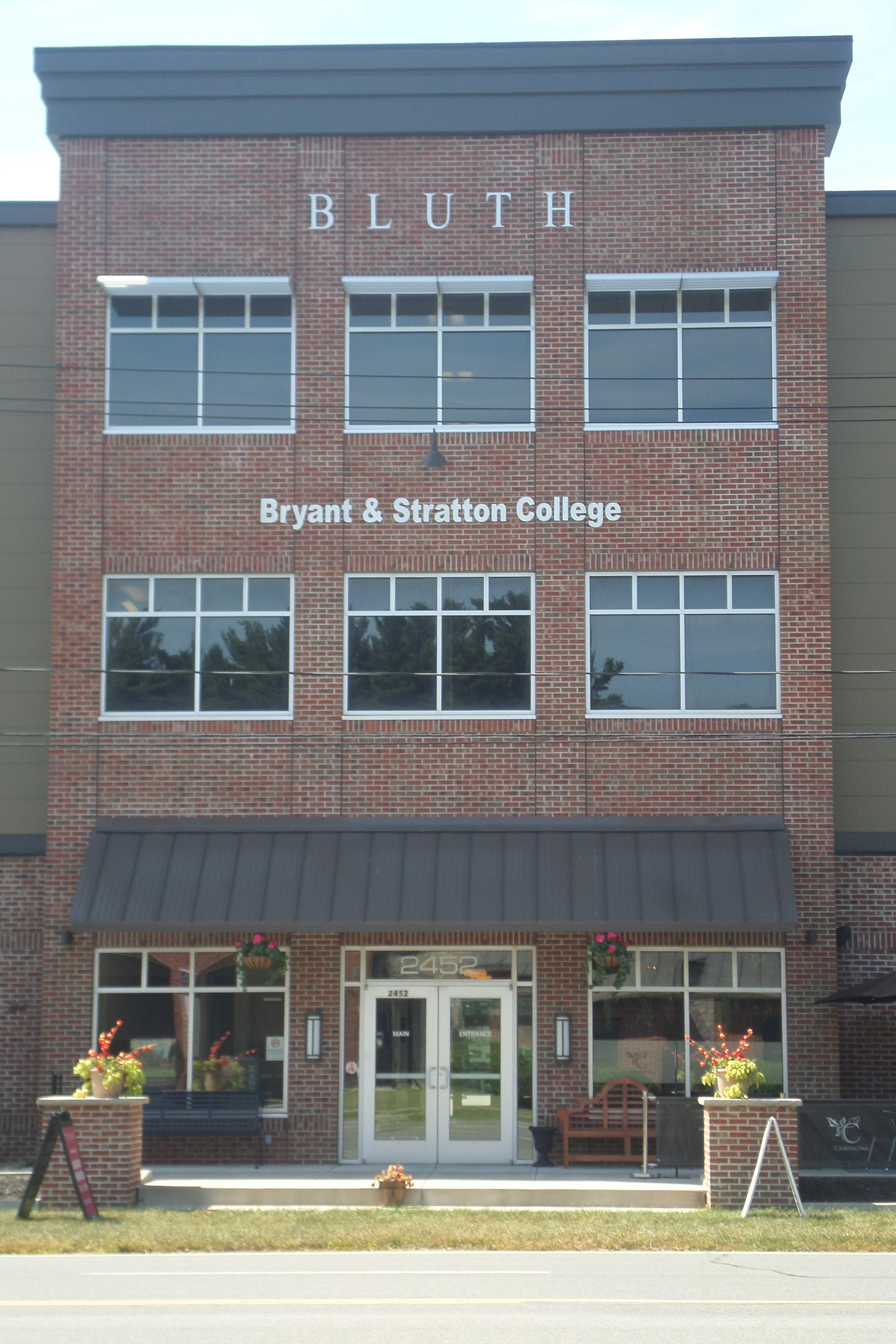
Contemporary campus building in Mechanicville, NY, north of Albany with modern Bryant & Stratton College sign.
