= Mary Hall Ingham =

American suffragist (1866–1937)

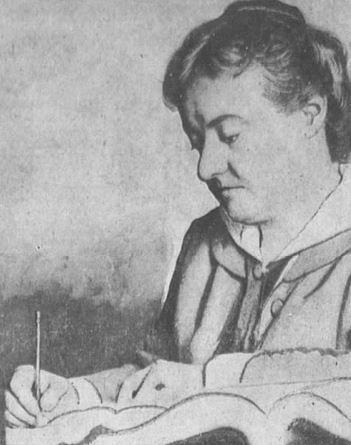
- Ingham in the Philadelphia Evening Public Ledger
- Born: November 24, 1866; Philadelphia, Pennsylvania, U.S.
- Died: January 1, 1937 (aged 70); Bryn Mawr, Pennsylvania, U.S.
- Education: Bryn Mawr College; Woman's Medical College of Pennsylvania; Radcliffe College
- Occupations: Reformer, suffragist

Mary Hall Ingham (November 24, 1866 – January 1, 1937) was an American suffragist and reformer. She was the chair of the Pennsylvania branch of the National Woman's Party. She picketed the White House as a part of the Silent Sentinels, was arrested, and spent time in the Occoquan Workhouse. She worked to secure the ratification of the 19th Amendment by the Pennsylvania legislature and fought for the Equal Rights Amendment. She founded the Equal Franchise Society of Philadelphia and was director of Philadelphia's Bureau of Municipal Research and the Octavia Hill Association. Ingham attended the Woman's Medical College of Pennsylvania, Bryn Mawr College, and Radcliffe College.

== Early life and education ==
Mary Hall Ingham was born on November 24, 1866, in Philadelphia, Pennsylvania, to Catherine Keppele (née Hall) and William Armstrong Ingham. Her grandfather was Samuel Delucenna Ingham, Treasury Secretary under President Andrew Jackson. She attended Agnes Irwin School. Though born into a prominent family, she was less than enthusiastic about society life.

Ingham entered the Woman's Medical College of Pennsylvania in 1898 and transferred to Bryn Mawr College in 1900. She earned her A.B. in 1903. She was then a private tutor, teaching art history. She was hired as a teacher by Agnes Irwin School, where she worked from 1905 to 1915. She was also a member of the Association of Collegiate Alumnae and served as the Philadelphia branch's president from 1906 to 1909.

== Suffrage and reform ==
Ingham was director of the tenement house-focused Octavia Hill Association and was on the Day Nursery Association's board of managers. She founded the Equal Franchise Society of Philadelphia in 1909 and served as its secretary. She supported the 1910 Philadelphia garment workers' strike. After the Women's Trade Union League established a branch in Philadelphia in 1915, she served on its advisory board and was one of its vice presidents.

Ingham was director of Philadelphia's Bureau of Municipal Research. She supported the city manager plan and the short ballot. She was a supporter of Rudolph Blankenburg's mayoral campaign in 1911. She supported Theodore Roosevelt in the 1912 United States presidential election, serving as vice chair of the Women of the Washington Party and assisting in the formation of the Progressive League of Philadelphia. Ingham worked for the securities firm William P. Bonbright & Co., serving as head of its women's department from 1915 to 1919.

In 1917, she became chair of the Pennsylvania branch of the National Woman's Party, a women's suffrage organization founded by Alice Paul. In July of that year, she picketed the White House as a part of the Silent Sentinels. She was arrested alongside 15 other women and served three days of a sixty-day sentence in the Occoquan Workhouse. She was arrested two more times. In 1919, Ingham joined a group of previously jailed suffragists who toured the United States as part of a publicity stunt, dressed in prison clothing, in a railroad car they called the "Prison Special". Following the passage of the suffrage amendment in Congress, Ingham worked to secure the ratification of the amendment by the Pennsylvania legislature, which occurred on June 24, 1919.

In 1920, Ingham picketed the Republican National Convention in Chicago and joined other women in pressuring Warren G. Harding to hasten ratification in Republican states. After the adoption of the 19th Amendment, she worked on behalf of an Equal Rights Amendment.

== Later life ==
Ingham attended Radcliffe College from 1921 to 1923, taking graduate courses in government. She supported the League of Nations but largely retired from her earlier reformist pursuits. She was an active mountaineer. Ingham died of cancer on January 1, 1937, in Bryn Mawr, Pennsylvania.
