= King's College London =

Public university in London, England

Coordinates: 51°30′43″N 0°06′58″W

- Coat of arms
- Latin: Collegium Regale Londinense or Collegium Regium apud Londinenses
- Motto: Latin: Sancte et Sapienter
- Motto in English: With Holiness and Wisdom
- Type: Public research university
- Established: 14 August 1829; 197 years ago (University status 2023; earliest recorded teaching in medical school 1561)
- Academic affiliations: ACU; EUA; The Guild; PLuS Alliance; Russell Group; SES; UNICA; University of London; Universities UK; Defence Universities Alliance
- Endowment: £340.8 million (2025)
- Budget: £1.377 billion (2024/25)
- Chair: Lord Stevens
- Visitor: (Appointed by the King in Council)
- Chancellor: Anne, Princess Royal (as Chancellor of the University of London)
- Vice-Chancellor and President: Shitij Kapur
- Academic staff: 6,355 (2024/25)
- Administrative staff: 5,260 (2024/25)
- Students: 40,870 (2024/25); 35,150 FTE (2024/25)
- Undergraduates: 23,200 (2024/25)
- Postgraduates: 17,670 (2024/25)
- Location: London, England
- Campus: Urban
- Patron: Charles III
- Newspaper: Roar News
Colours
Blue & King's red
- Mascot: Reggie the Lion
- Website: kcl.ac.uk

King's College London (informally King's or KCL) is a public research university in London, England. King's was established by royal charter in 1829 under the patronage of King George IV and the Duke of Wellington. In 1836, King's became one of the two founding colleges of the University of London. It is one of the oldest university-level institutions in England.

King's grew in the late 20th century through a series of mergers and reincorporations, including the reincorporation of its medical and dental school in 1983, mergers with Queen Elizabeth College and Chelsea College of Science and Technology in 1985 and the Institute of Psychiatry in 1997, and the merger of the United Medical and Dental Schools of Guy's and St Thomas' Hospitals in 1998. Plans for a merger with Cranfield University were announced in May 2026.

King's operates across five main campuses: the historic Strand Campus in central London, three other Thames-side campuses (Guy's, St Thomas' and Waterloo) nearby, and a campus in Denmark Hill in south London. It also has a presence in Shrivenham, Oxfordshire, for professional military education, and in Newquay, Cornwall, which is where King's information service center is based. The academic activities are organized into nine faculties, which are subdivided into numerous departments, centers, and research divisions. In 2024/25, King's reported total income of £1.377 billion, of which £260.5 million was from research grants and contracts. It has the fourth largest endowment of any university in the UK, and the largest of any in London. King's is the sixth-largest university in the UK by total enrolment and receives over 68,000 undergraduate applications per year.

King's is a member of a range of academic organizations including the Association of Commonwealth Universities, the European University Association, and the Russell Group. King's is home to the Medical Research Council's MRC Centre for Neurodevelopmental Disorders and is a founding member of the King's Health Partners academic health sciences centre, Francis Crick Institute and MedCity. By total enrolment, it is the largest European centre for graduate and post-graduate medical teaching and biomedical research, including the world's first nursing school, the Florence Nightingale Faculty of Nursing and Midwifery. King's is generally regarded as part of the "golden triangle" of universities located in and about Oxford, Cambridge and London. King's has typically enjoyed royal patronage by virtue of its foundation; King Charles III reaffirmed patronage in May 2024.

Alumni and staff of King's or institutions that later merged with King's include 14 Nobel Prize laureates; heads of states, governments and intergovernmental organisations; 21 current members of the House of Commons, two Speakers of the House of Commons and 12 current members of the House of Lords; and the recipients of three Oscars.

== History ==
=== Foundation ===
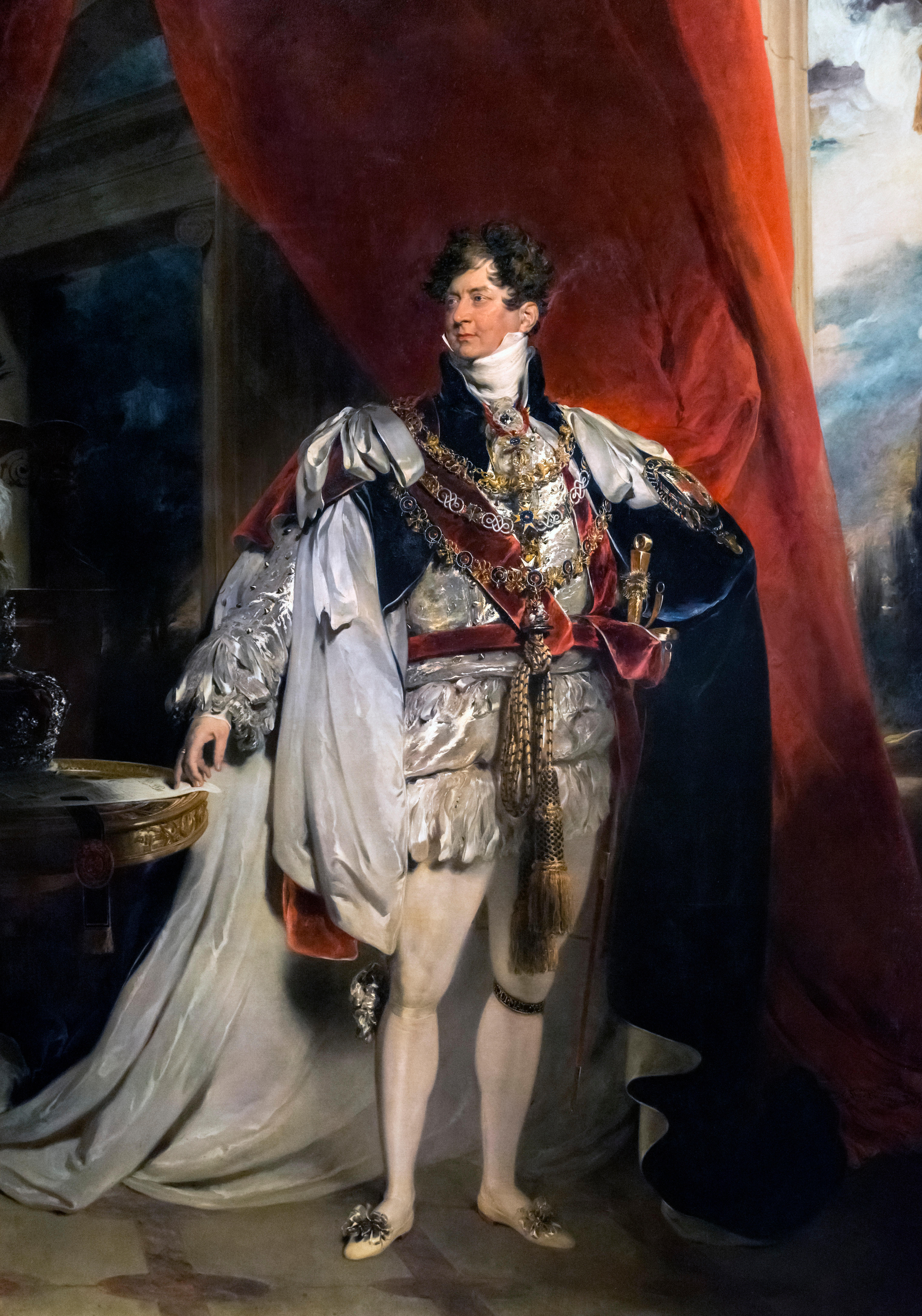
The patron of King's College London, King George IV, shown in a portrait by Sir Thomas Lawrence.

King's College, so named in recognition of the patronage of King George IV, was founded in 1829 (though the roots of King's medical school, St. Thomas, date back to the 16th century with recorded first teaching in 1561) in response to the theological controversy surrounding the founding of "London University" (which later became University College, London) in 1826. London University was founded, with the backing of Utilitarians, Jews and Nonconformists, as a secular institution, intended to educate "the youth of our middling rich people between the ages of 15 or 16 and 20 or later" giving its nickname, "the godless college in Gower Street". The need for such an institution was a result of the religious and social nature of the universities of Oxford and Cambridge, which then educated solely the sons of wealthy Anglicans. The secular nature of London University gained disapproval, indeed, "the storms of opposition which raged around it threatened to crush every spark of vital energy which remained".

The creation of King's College as a rival institution represented a Tory response to reaffirm the educational values of the established order. More widely, King's was one of the first of a series of institutions which came about in the early nineteenth century as a result of the Industrial Revolution and great social changes in England following the Napoleonic Wars. By virtue of its foundation, King's enjoys the patronage of the monarch, had the Archbishop of Canterbury as its visitor, and during the nineteenth century counted among its official governors the Lord Chancellor, Speaker of the House of Commons and the Lord Mayor of London.

==== Duel in Battersea Fields, 21 March 1829 ====
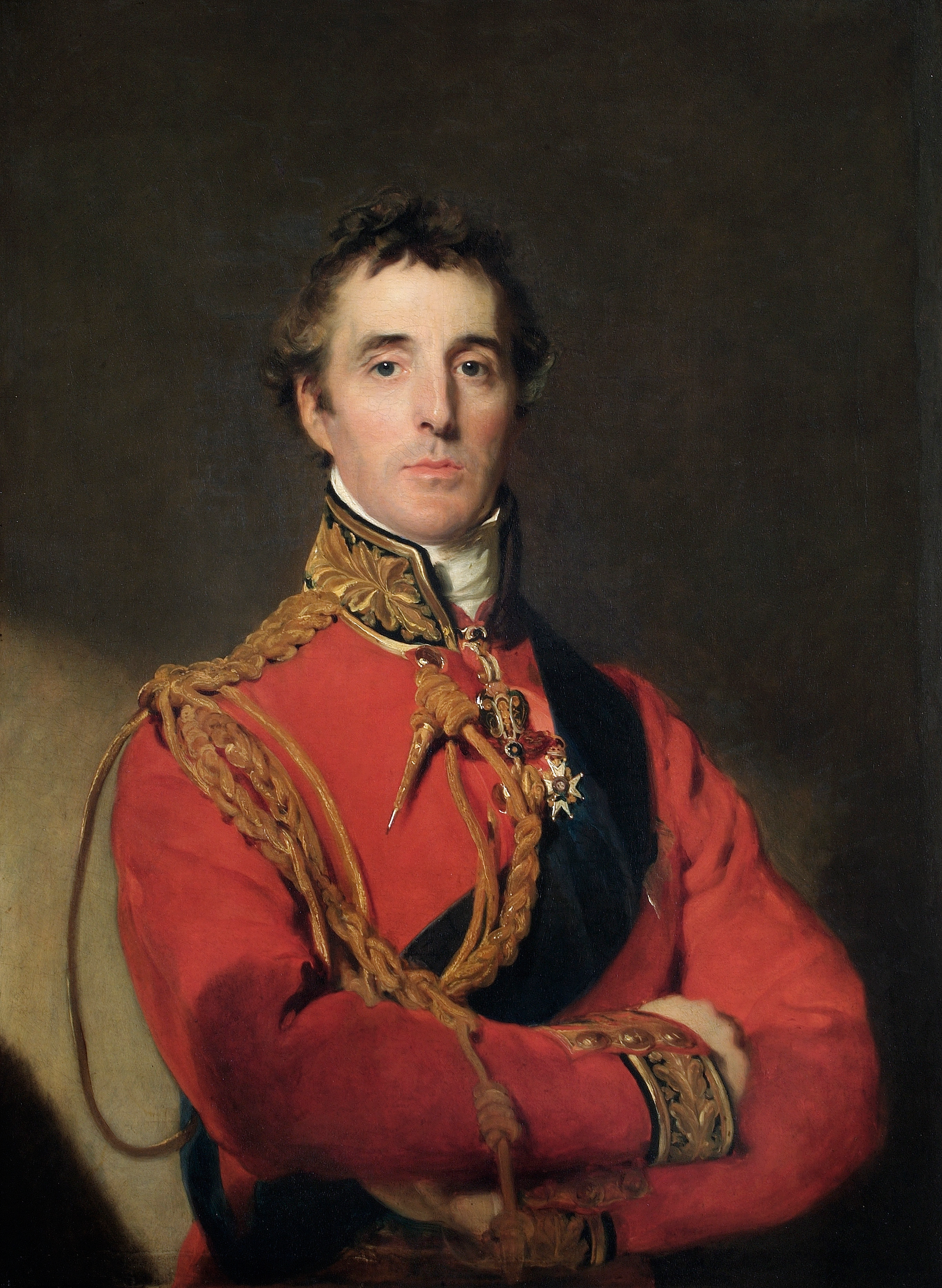
Arthur Wellesley, 1st Duke of Wellington and then prime minister, fought a duel against the Earl of Winchilsea in 1829 over the Duke's support for the rights of Irish Catholics and the independence of the newly established King's College London

The simultaneous support of Arthur Wellesley, 1st Duke of Wellington (who was also Prime Minister of the United Kingdom then), for an Anglican King's College London and the Roman Catholic Relief Act, which was to lead to the granting of almost full civil rights to Catholics, was challenged by George Finch-Hatton, 10th Earl of Winchilsea, in early 1829. Winchilsea and his supporters wished for King's to be subject to the Test Acts, like the universities of Oxford, where only members of the Church of England could matriculate, and Cambridge, where non-Anglicans could matriculate but not graduate, but this was not Wellington's intent.

Winchilsea and about 150 other contributors withdrew their support of King's College London in response to Wellington's support of Catholic emancipation. In a letter to Wellington, he accused the Duke to have in mind "insidious designs for the infringement of our liberty and the introduction of Popery into every department of the State". The letter provoked a furious exchange of correspondence and Wellington accused Winchilsea of imputing him with "disgraceful and criminal motives" in setting up King's College London. When Winchilsea refused to retract the remarks, Wellington – by his own admission, "no advocate of duelling" and a virgin duellist – demanded satisfaction in a contest of arms: "I now call upon your lordship to give me that satisfaction for your conduct which a gentleman has a right to require, and which a gentleman never refuses to give."

The result was a duel in Battersea Fields on 21 March 1829. Winchilsea did not fire his pistol, a plan he and his second almost certainly decided upon before the duel; Wellington took aim and fired wide to the right. Accounts differ as to whether Wellington missed on purpose. Wellington, noted for his poor aim, claimed he did, other reports more sympathetic to Winchilsea claimed he had aimed to kill. Honour was saved and Winchilsea wrote Wellington an apology. Every year, "Duel Day" is commemorated on the first Thursday following March 21, featuring a range of events across King's, including reenactments.

=== 19th century ===
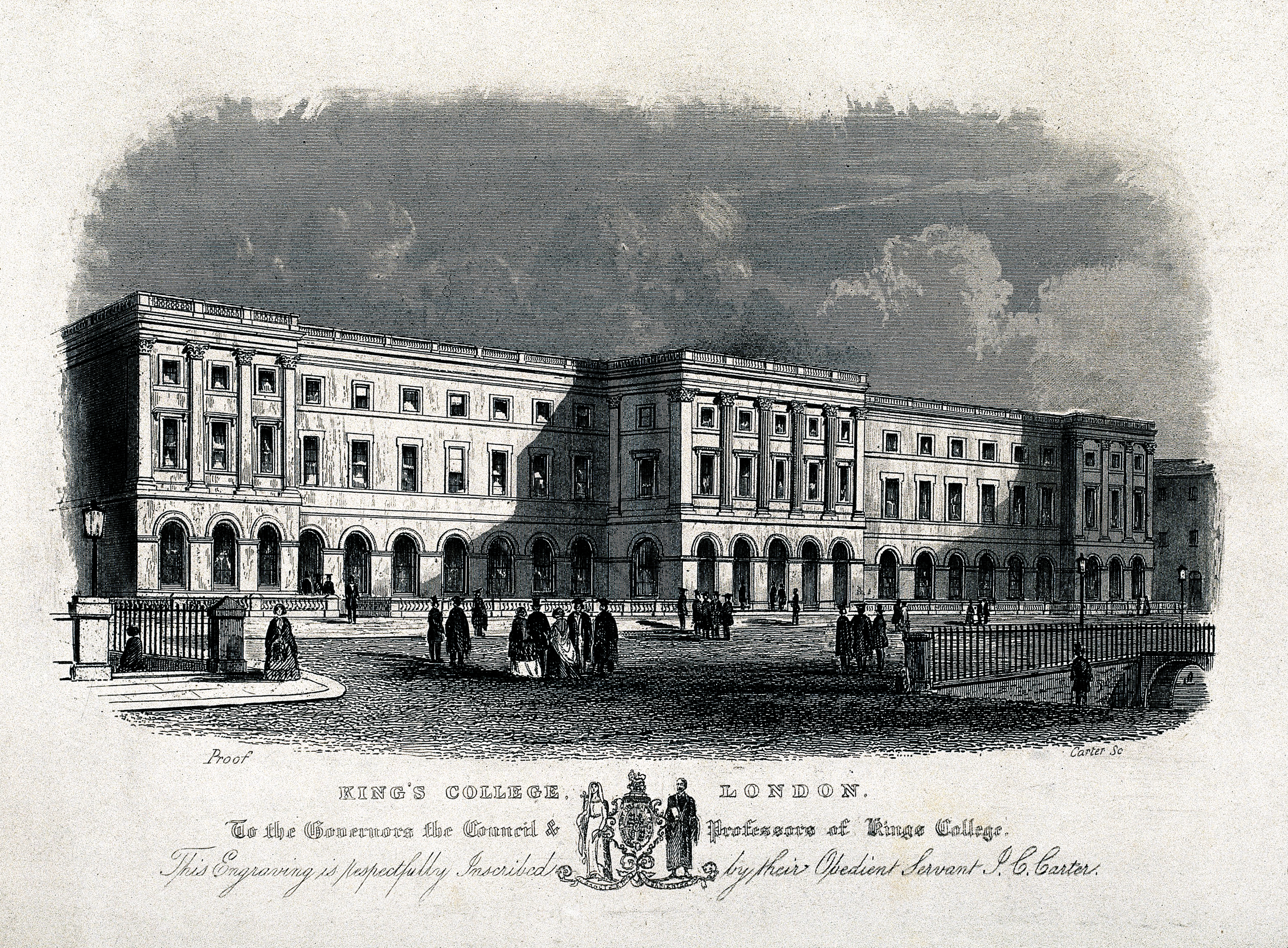
King's College London in 1831, as engraved by J. C. Carter

William Otter (1831–36), the first Principal of King's College London

King's opened in October 1831 with the cleric William Otter appointed as first principal and lecturer in divinity. The Archbishop of Canterbury presided over the opening ceremony, in which a sermon was given in the chapel by Charles James Blomfield, the Bishop of London, on the subject of combining religious instruction with intellectual culture. Despite the attempts to make King's Anglican-only, the initial prospectus permitted, "nonconformists of all sorts to enter the college freely". William Howley: the governors and the professors, except the linguists, were required to be members of the Church of England but the students did not, though attendance at chapel was compulsory.

King's was divided into a senior department and a junior department, also known as King's College School, which was originally situated in the basement of the Strand Campus. The junior department started with 85 pupils and only three teachers, but quickly grew to 500 by 1841, outgrowing its facilities and leading it to relocate to Wimbledon in 1897 where it remains, though it is no longer associated with King's College London. Within the senior department teaching was divided into three courses: a general course comprised divinity, classical languages, mathematics, English literature and history; a medical course; and miscellaneous subjects, such as law, political economy and modern languages, which were not related to any systematic course of study at the time and depended for their continuance on the supply of occasional students. In 1833 the general course was reorganised leading to the award of the Associate of King's College (AKC), the first qualification issued by King's. The course, which concerns questions of ethics and theology, is still awarded to students and staff who take an optional three-year course alongside their studies.

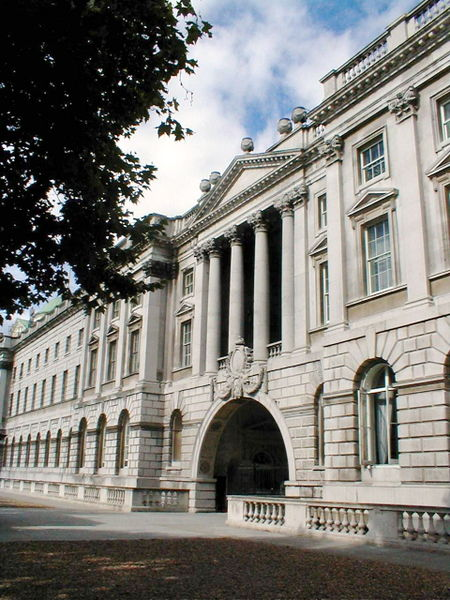
The Embankment terrace entrance to the Strand Campus overlooking the River Thames, originally designed by Sir William Chambers, was completed by Sir Robert Smirke in 1835

The river frontage was completed in April 1835 at a cost of £7,100, fulfilling a key stipulation required by King's College London securing the site from the Crown. Unlike those in the school, student numbers in the Senior department remained almost stationary during King's first five years of existence. During this time the medical school was blighted by inefficiency and the divided loyalties of the staff leading to a steady decline in attendance. One of the most important appointments was that of Charles Wheatstone as professor of Experimental Philosophy.

At the time, neither King's, "London University", nor the medical schools at the London hospitals had the authority to confer degrees. In 1835 the government announced that it would establish an examining board to grant degrees, with "London University" and King's both becoming affiliated colleges. This became the University of London in 1836, the former "London University" becoming University College, London (UCL). The first University of London degrees were awarded to King's College London students in 1839.

In 1840, King's opened its own hospital on Portugal Street near Lincoln's Inn Fields, an area composed of overcrowded rookeries characterised by poverty and disease. The governance of King's College Hospital was later transferred to the corporation of the hospital established by the King's College Hospital Act 1851. The hospital moved to new premises in Denmark Hill, Camberwell in 1913. The appointment in 1877 of Joseph Lister as professor of clinical surgery greatly benefited the medical school, and the introduction of Lister's antiseptic surgical methods gained the hospital an international reputation.

In 1845, King's established a Military Department to train officers for the Army and the British East India Company, and in 1846 a Theological Department to train Anglican priests. In 1855, King's pioneered evening classes in London; that King's granted students at the evening classes certificates of college attendance to enable them to sit University of London degree exams was cited as an example of the worthlessness of these certificates in the decision by the University of London to end the affiliated colleges system in 1858 and open their examinations to everybody.

King's College London Act 1882
- Act of Parliament
- Parliament of the United Kingdom
- Long title: An Act to amend the Constitution of King's College London and for other purposes relating thereto.
- Citation: 45 & 46 Vict. c. xiii

Dates
- Royal assent: 19 May 1882
Other legislation
Repealed by	King's College London Act 1978

Status: Repealed

Text of statute as originally enacted

The King's College London Act 1882 (45 & 46 Vict. c. xiii) amended the constitution. The act removed the proprietorial nature of King's, changing the name of the corporation from "The Governors and Proprietors of King's College, London" to "King's College London" and annulling the 1829 charter (although King's remained incorporated under that charter). The act also changed King's College London from a (technically) for-profit corporation to a non-profit one (no dividends had ever been paid out in over 50 years of operation) and extended the objects of King's to include the education of women. The Ladies' Department of King's College London was opened in Kensington Square in 1885, which later in 1902 became King's College Women's Department.

=== 20th century ===
King's College London Act 1903
- Act of Parliament
- Parliament of the United Kingdom
- Long title: An Act to amend King's College London Act 1882.
- Citation: 3 Edw. 7. c. xcii

Dates
- Royal assent: 21 July 1903
Other legislation
Repealed by	King's College London Act 1978

Status: Repealed

Text of statute as originally enacted

King's College London (Transfer) Act 1908
- Act of Parliament
- Parliament of the United Kingdom
- Long title: An Act for transferring to the University of London the powers and duties of King's College London in relation to instruction of a university standard in subjects comprised within the faculties in the university other than the faculty of theology and for other matters connected therewith.
- Citation: 8 Edw. 7. c. xxxix

Dates
- Royal assent: 1 August 1908

Text of statute as originally enacted

The King's College London Act 1903 (3 Edw. 7. c. xcii) abolished all remaining religious tests for staff, except within the Theological department. In 1910, King's was (with the exception of the Theological department) merged into the University of London under the King's College London (Transfer) Act 1908 (8 Edw. 7. c. xxxix), losing its legal independence.

During the First World War, the medical school was opened to women for the first time. From 1916 to 1921, the college's Department of Italian was headed by a woman, Linetta de Castelvecchio. The end of the war saw an influx of students, which strained existing facilities to the point where some classes were held in the Principal's house.

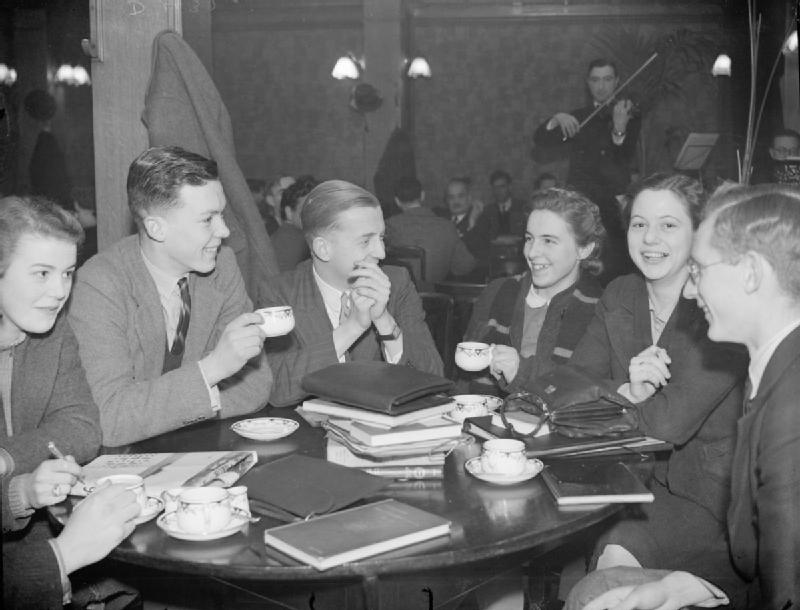
Evacuated King's College London students at the University of Bristol during the Second World War

In World War II, the buildings of King's College London were used by the Auxiliary Fire Service with a number of King's staff, mainly those then known as college servants, serving as firewatchers. Parts of the Strand building, the quadrangle, and the roof of apse and stained glass windows of the chapel suffered bomb damage in the Blitz. During post-war reconstruction, the vaults beneath the quadrangle were replaced by a two-storey laboratory, which opened in 1952, for the departments of Physics and Civil and Electrical Engineering.

One of the most famous pieces of scientific research performed at King's were the crucial contributions to the discovery of the double helix structure of DNA in 1953 by Maurice Wilkins and Rosalind Franklin, together with Raymond Gosling, Alex Stokes, Herbert Wilson, and other associates at the Randall Division of Cell and Molecular Biophysics at King's.

Major reconstruction of King's began in 1966 following the publication of the Robbins Report on Higher Education. A new block facing the Strand designed by E. D. Jefferiss Mathews was opened in 1972. In 1980 King's regained its legal independence under a new Royal Charter. In 1993 King's, along with other large University of London colleges, gained direct access to government funding (which had previously been through the university) and the right to confer University of London degrees itself. This contributed to King's and the other large colleges being regarded as de facto universities in their own right.

King's College London Act 1978
- Act of Parliament
- Parliament of the United Kingdom
- Long title: An Act to unite that part of the University of London known as University of London King's College with the Corporation of King's College London; to transfer certain functions, rights, properties and liabilities from the University to the Corporation; to provide for the pooling of investments and moneys of certain funds of the Corporation; and for connected or other purposes.
- Citation: 1978 c. xii

Dates
- Royal assent: 20 July 1978

Text of statute as originally enacted

King's College London underwent several mergers with other institutions in the late 20th century. These including the reincorporation in 1983 of the King's College School of Medicine and Dentistry, which had become independent of King's College Hospital at the foundation of the National Health Service in 1948, mergers with Queen Elizabeth College and Chelsea College in 1985, and the Institute of Psychiatry in 1997. In 1998 the United Medical and Dental Schools of Guy's and St Thomas' Hospitals merged with King's to form the GKT School of Medical Education. Also in 1998 Florence Nightingale's original training school for nurses merged with the King's Department of Nursing Studies as the Florence Nightingale School of Nursing and Midwifery. The same year King's acquired the former Public Record Office building on Chancery Lane and converted it at a cost of £35 million into the Maughan Library, which opened in 2002.

=== 21st century ===
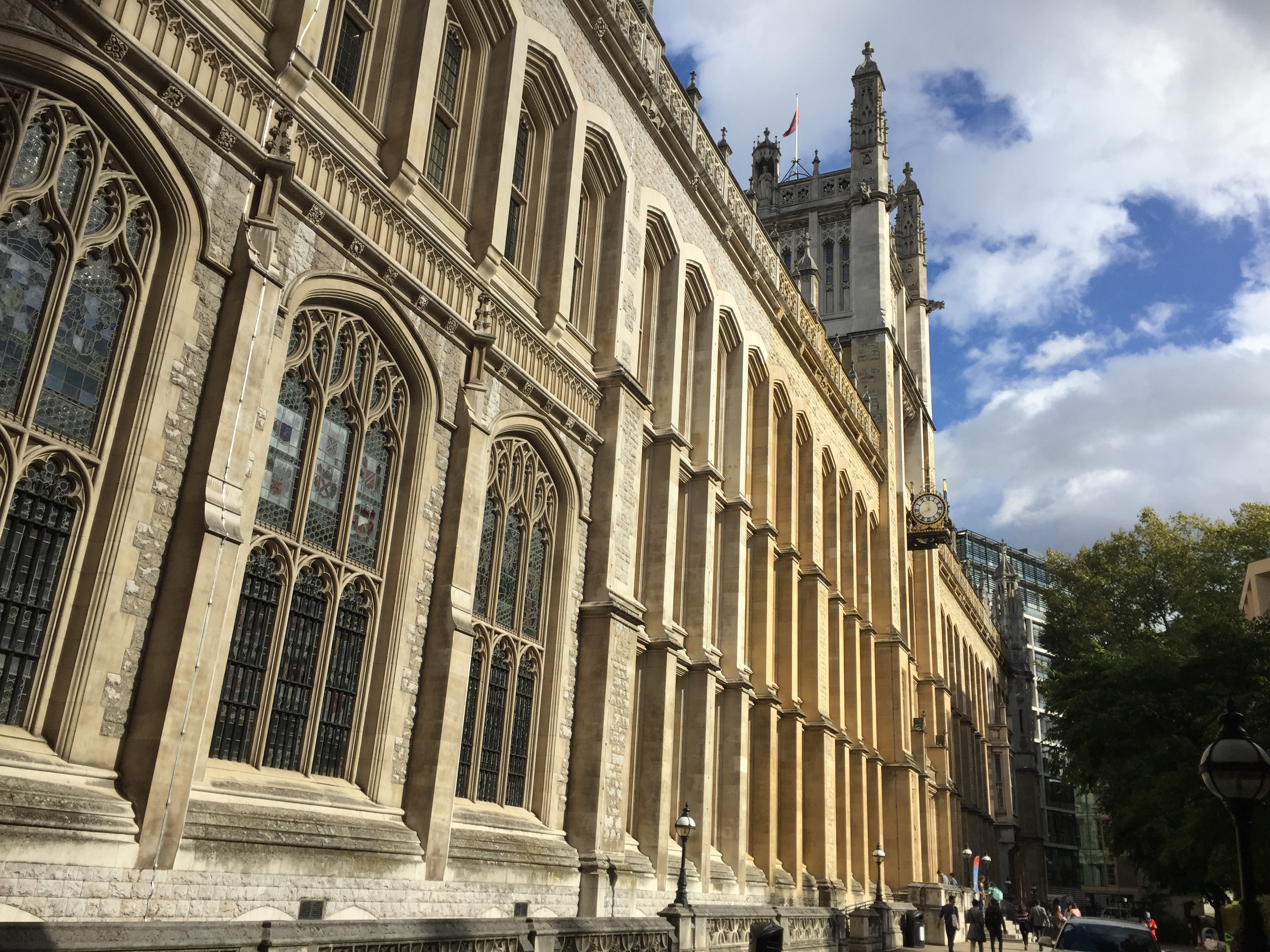
The Maughan Library. Following a £35M renovation, it is the largest new university library in the United Kingdom since World War II

In July 2006, King's College London was granted independent degree-awarding powers in its own right, as opposed to through the University of London, by the Privy Council. This power remained unexercised until 2007, when King's announced that all students starting courses from September 2007 onwards would be awarded degrees conferred by King's itself, rather than by the University of London. The new certificates however still make reference to the fact that King's is a constituent college of the University of London. The first King's degrees were awarded in summer 2008.

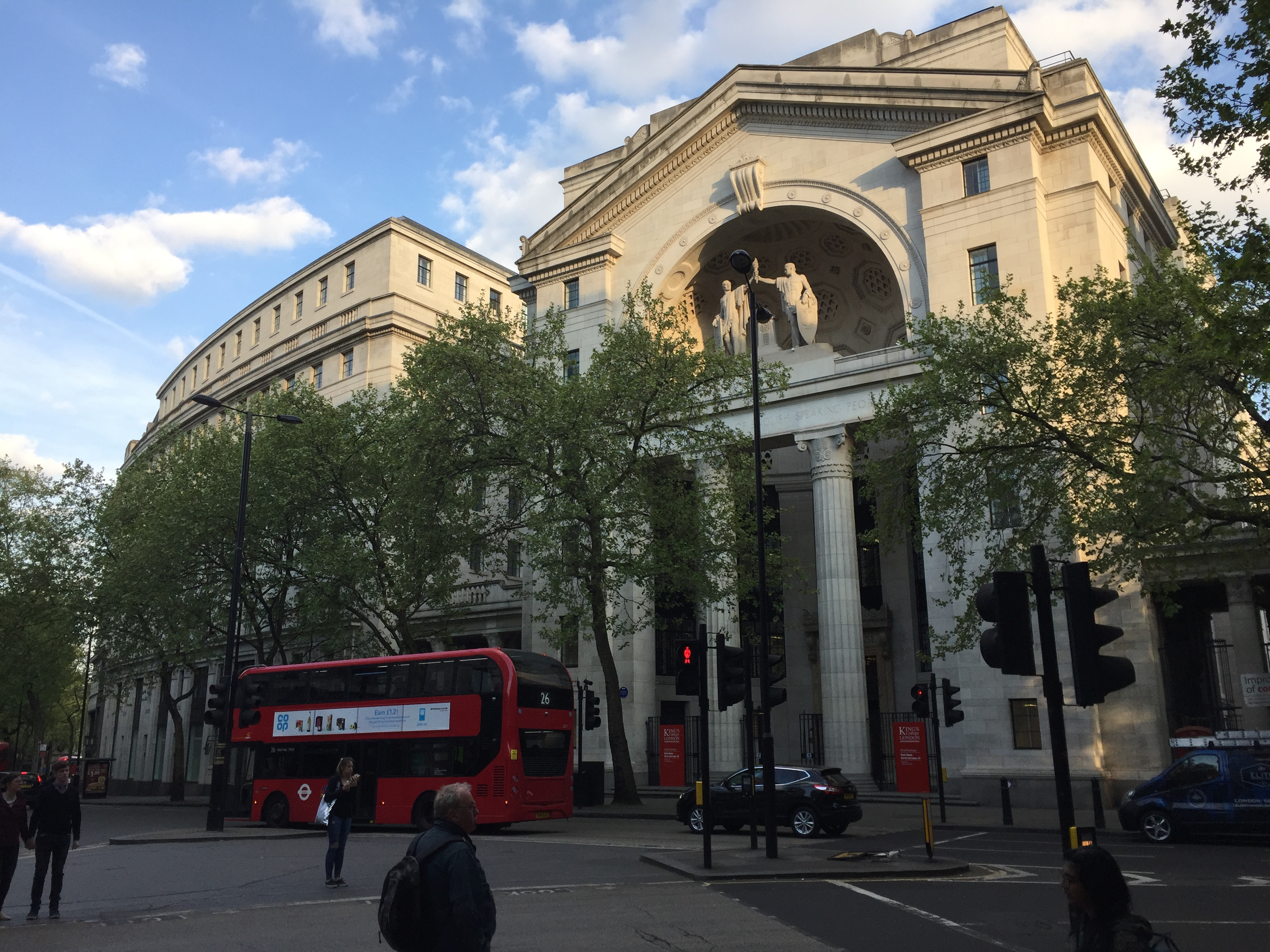
Bush House, Strand Campus

In April 2011, King's became a founding partner in the UK Centre for Medical Research and Innovation, subsequently renamed the Francis Crick Institute, committing £40 million to the project. The Chemistry department was reopened in 2011 following its closure in 2003. In February 2012, the Queen officially opened Somerset House East Wing.

In September 2014, King's College London opened King's College London Mathematics School, a free school sixth form located in Lambeth that specialises in mathematics. In October 2014, Ed Byrne replaced Rick Trainor as Principal of King's College London, the latter having served for 10 years. In December 2014, King's announced its plans to rebrand its name to 'King's London'. After concerns were raised by the students' union, a statement from the college later in December emphasised that there were no plans to change the legal name of King's, and said that the branding of 'King's London' was "designed to promote King's and its place in London and also the fact that we are one of the world's great universities in our own right". King's announced that the rebranding plans had been dropped in January 2015.

In 2015, King's acquired a 50-year lease for the Aldwych Quarter site incorporating the historic Bush House. It has been occupied since 2017. Bush House was opened as part of the Strand Campus by the Queen in 2019.

Following the passing of the University of London Act 2018, which allowed member institutions to become universities in their own right while remaining part of the University of London, King's applied for university status in 2019. Following approval by the Office for Students, a supplemental charter granting university status was sealed on 18 May 2023.

Plans to merge with Cranfield University in Bedfordshire were announced in May 2026. This would form the second largest campus-based university in the UK (behind UCL). The merged institution is to keep the name King's College London, with the current King's vice-chancellor remaining in post. The merger is expected to be completed by the start of the 2027–2028 academic year, whereupon the Cranfield Institute of Technology will become the tenth faculty of King's, retaining a link to the Cranfield name.

== Campus ==
King's is based on five campuses in central London. The main campus area is located on the Strand in the City of Westminster, which includes the Bush House, and the Waterloo Campus is located nearby on the southern side of the River Thames. The Guy's Campus which houses the science-related courses is located near London Bridge, St. Thomas' Campus is located in Lambeth, and the Denmark Hill Campus is in Southwark.

=== Strand Campus ===
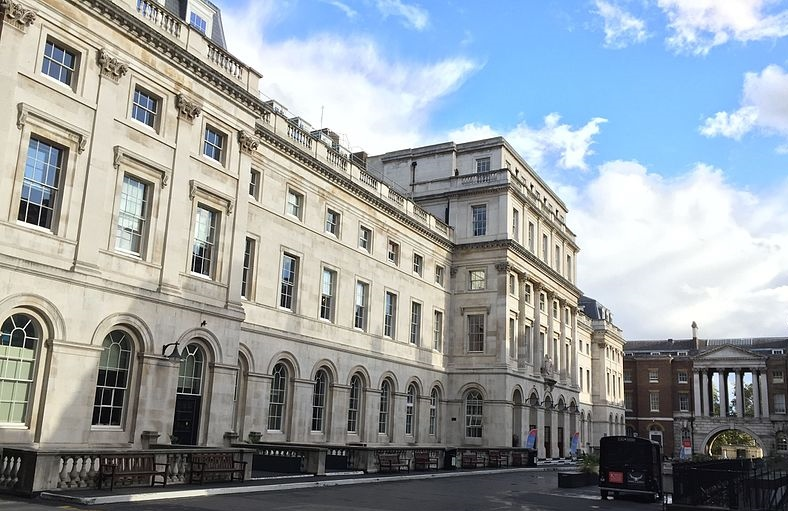
The Grade I listed King's Building in the Strand Quadrangle, designed by Sir Robert Smirke

The Strand Campus is the original campus of King's. The campus is based around the Grade I listed original King's Building constructed for the college in 1831, designed by Sir Robert Smirke, adjacent to Somerset House and sharing its frontage along the River Thames, including the King's College London Chapel, redesigned in 1864 by Sir George Gilbert Scott. The campus also includes buildings along the adjacent Surrey Street, the Strand Building and the east wing of Somerset House. Beyond this contiguous complex of buildings, the campus also includes Bush House on the opposite side of the Strand and the Maughan Library on Chancery Lane. The nearby Virginia Woolf Building was also part of the Strand Campus area until the lease expired in autumn 2025.

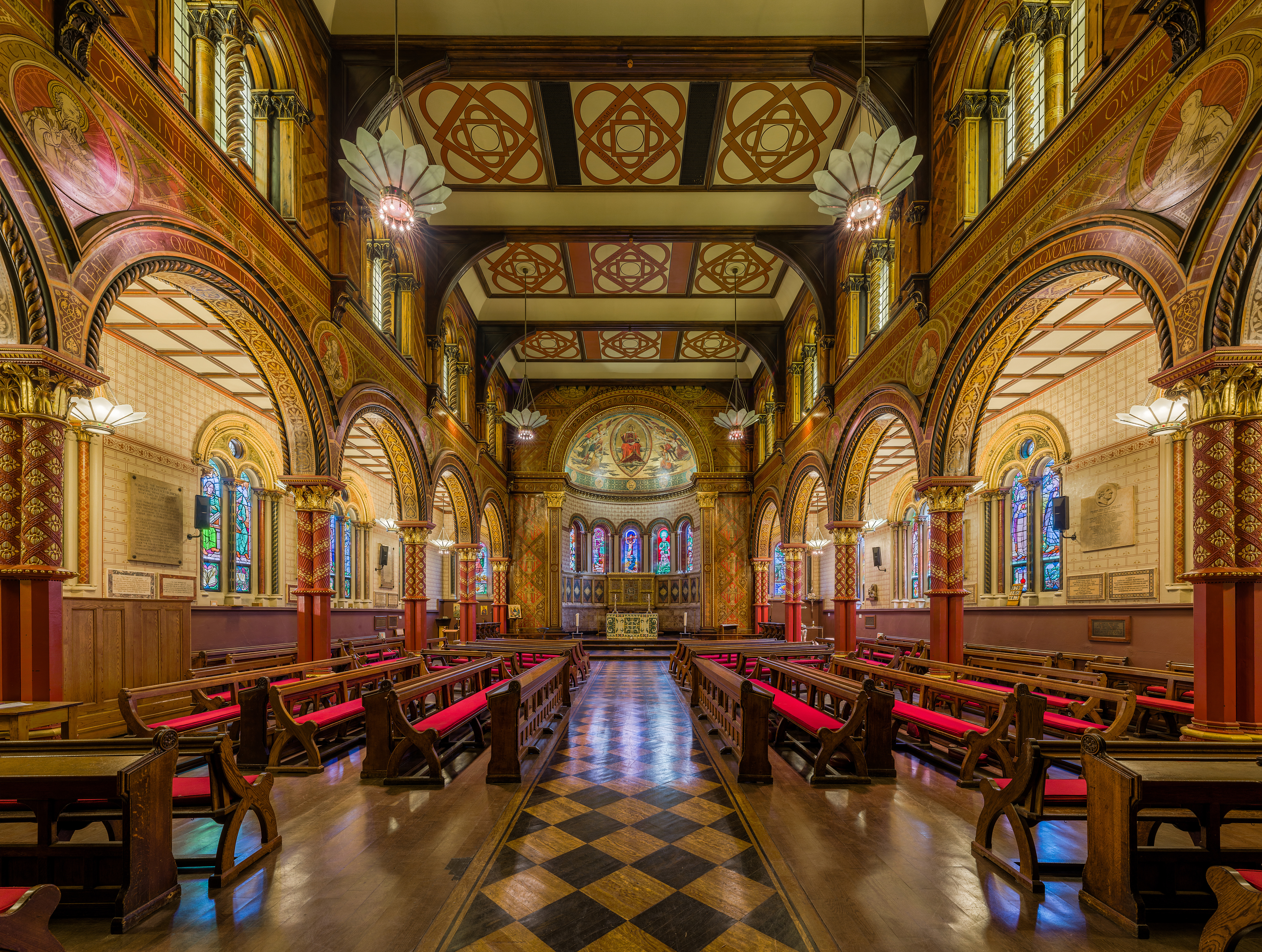
The King's College London Chapel inside the King's Building, redesigned in 1864 by Sir George Gilbert Scott

The Strand Campus houses the arts and science faculties of King's, including the faculties of arts and humanities, law, natural and mathematical sciences, social science and public policy, and business, as well as the King's Foundation.

King's College London Students' Union runs the Shack café and the Vault bar in Bush House on the Strand Campus, and has two contact hubs on the campus, also in Bush House.

=== Guy's Campus ===
Guy's Campus is close to London Bridge, right next to The Shard, and it is adjacent to Guy's Hospital. It is home to the faculty of life sciences and medicine (also at the Waterloo, St Thomas' and Denmark Hill Campuses), the dental institute, and the institute of psychiatry, psychology and neuroscience (also at the Denmark Hill Campus).

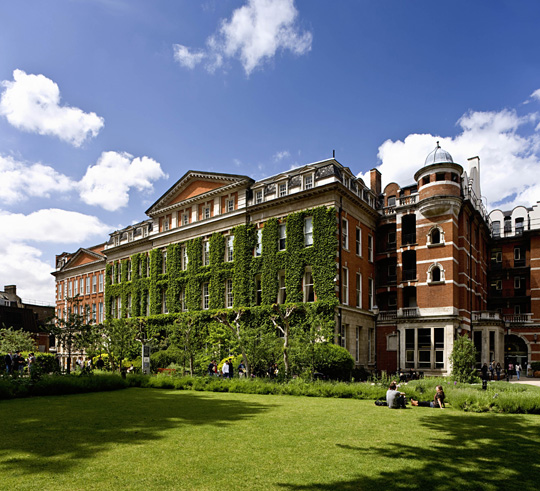
The Hodgkin Building, Guy's Campus

Buildings include: the Henriette Raphael building, the Hodgkin building and Shepherd's House. The campus is also home to the Gordon Museum of Pathology and the Museum of Life Sciences (neither of which is open to the public), as well as the Chapel of Thomas Guy. The Students' Union runs Guy's Bar, Guy's Café and a contact hub on the Guy's Campus. The Great Dover Street Apartments and Wolfson House halls of residence are close to the campus.

The hospital and the campus are named after Thomas Guy, who established the hospital with money from his investments in the slave-trading South Sea Company. A statue of Thomas Guy, installed in 1734 and owned by the Guy's and St Thomas’ Foundation, stands outside the hospital, on the grounds of the university campus. This was boarded up in 2020, following the George Floyd protests, it was de-boarded for conservation work, with temporary interpretation added, in November 2022. Permanent interpretation was installed in November 2023.

=== Waterloo Campus ===
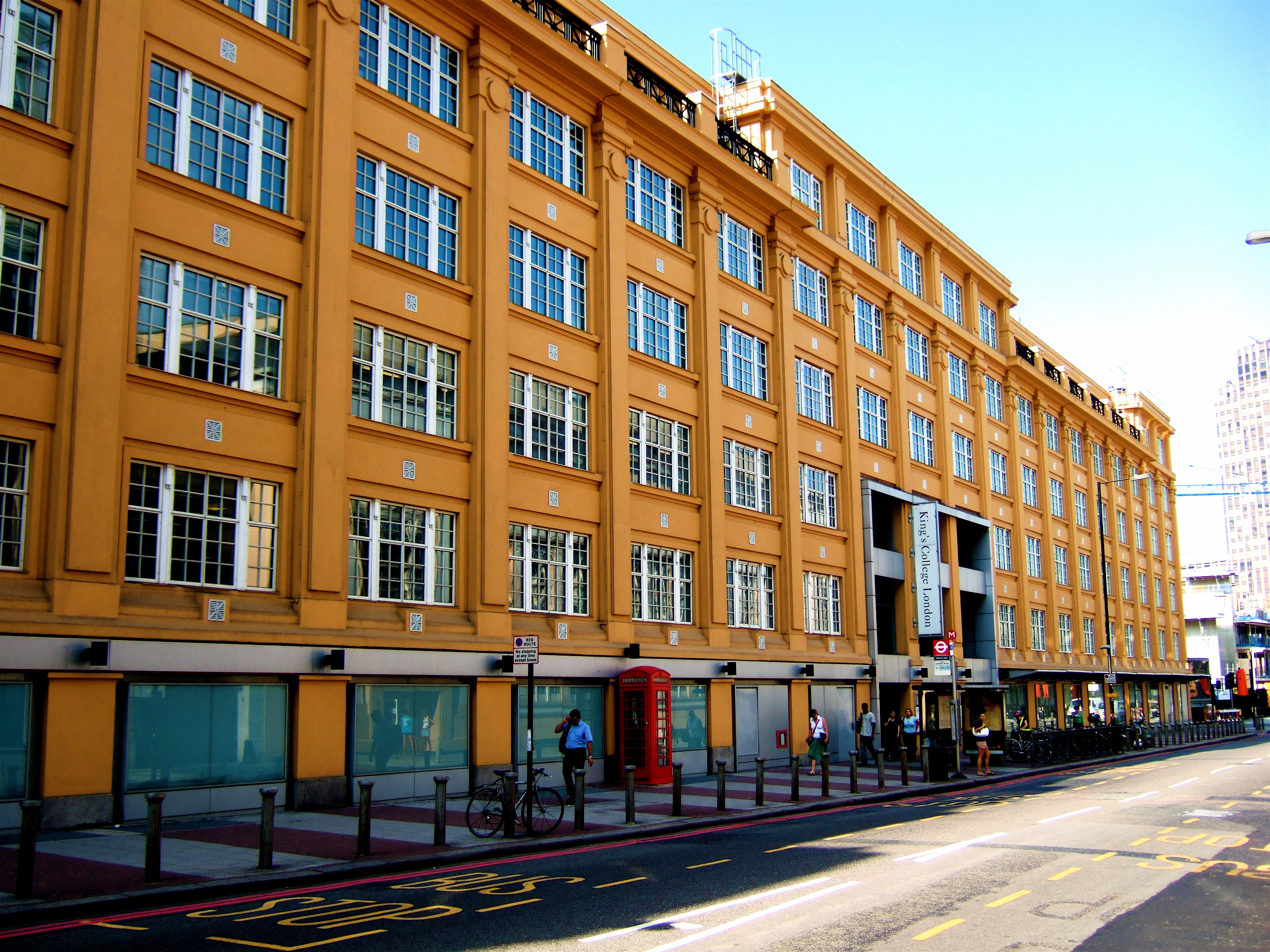
The Franklin-Wilkins Building, Waterloo Campus

The Waterloo Campus is in Lambeth, across Waterloo Bridge from the Strand Campus and adjacent to the Southbank Centre. It has three main buildings: the James Clerk Maxwell Building, the Franklin–Wilkins Building (one of the largest university buildings in London) and the Stamford Street Apartments (student accommodation).

The campus is home to the Florence Nightingale faculty of nursing and midwifery and parts of the faculty of life sciences and medicine (also on Guy's Campus); the faculty of social science and public policy (also on the Strand Campus); and the London Dental Education Centre, part of the Dental Institute (also on the Guy's and Denmark Hill campuses). The students' union has a contact hub in the Franklin-Wilkins Building.

=== St Thomas' Campus ===
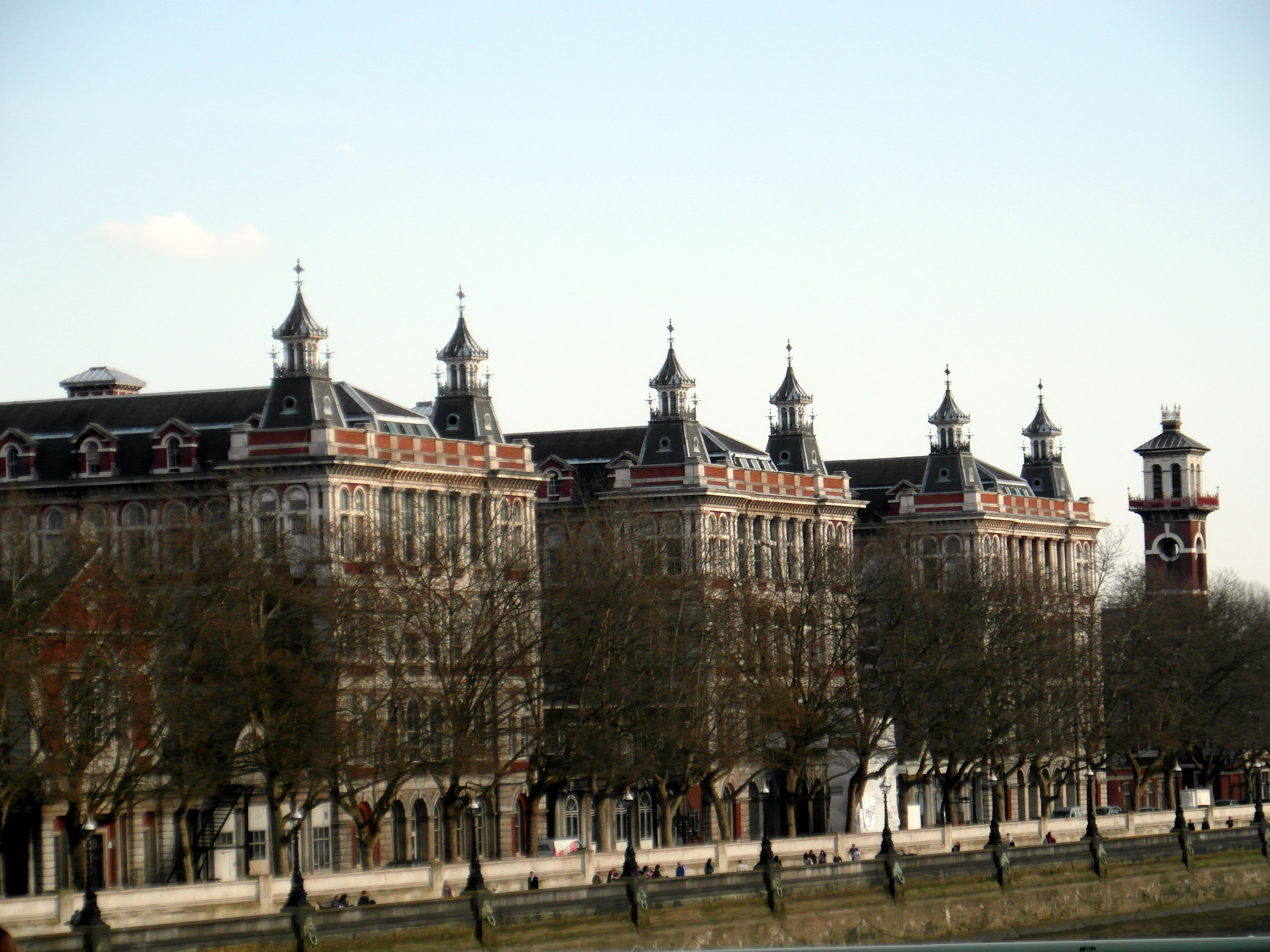
South Wing, St Thomas' Hospital

The St Thomas' Campus is located at St Thomas' Hospital, named after St Thomas Becket, in Lambeth, facing the Houses of Parliament across the Thames. It carries out continuing medical and dental training as well as housing the Florence Nightingale Museum, an independent charity.

=== Denmark Hill Campus ===
The Denmark Hill Campus is situated in Camberwell in Southwark. It is the home of the Institute of Psychiatry, Psychology and Neuroscience (IoPPN) and also houses parts of the dental institute and the faculty of life sciences and medicine. The students' union has a contact hub in the IoPPN.

=== Other sites ===
==== Halls of residence ====
King's has halls of residence across central London. With the exception of the Stamford Street Apartments on the Waterloo Campus, these are separate sites from the college's campuses.

==== Sports grounds ====
The college has two sports grounds, at New Malden and Honor Oak Park in London.

==== Shrivenham ====
Whilst not a formal campus, King's retains an academic presence and estate at the Defence Academy of the United Kingdom in Shrivenham, Oxfordshire. Through its Defence Studies Department, King's has delivered professional military training to much of the UK armed services through the Joint Services Command and Staff College since 2000 under contract to the Ministry of Defence.

==== Newquay ====
The King's service centre, established in 2015 to provide professional services and IT support to the university, is located in Newquay, Cornwall.

== Organisation and administration ==
=== Governance ===
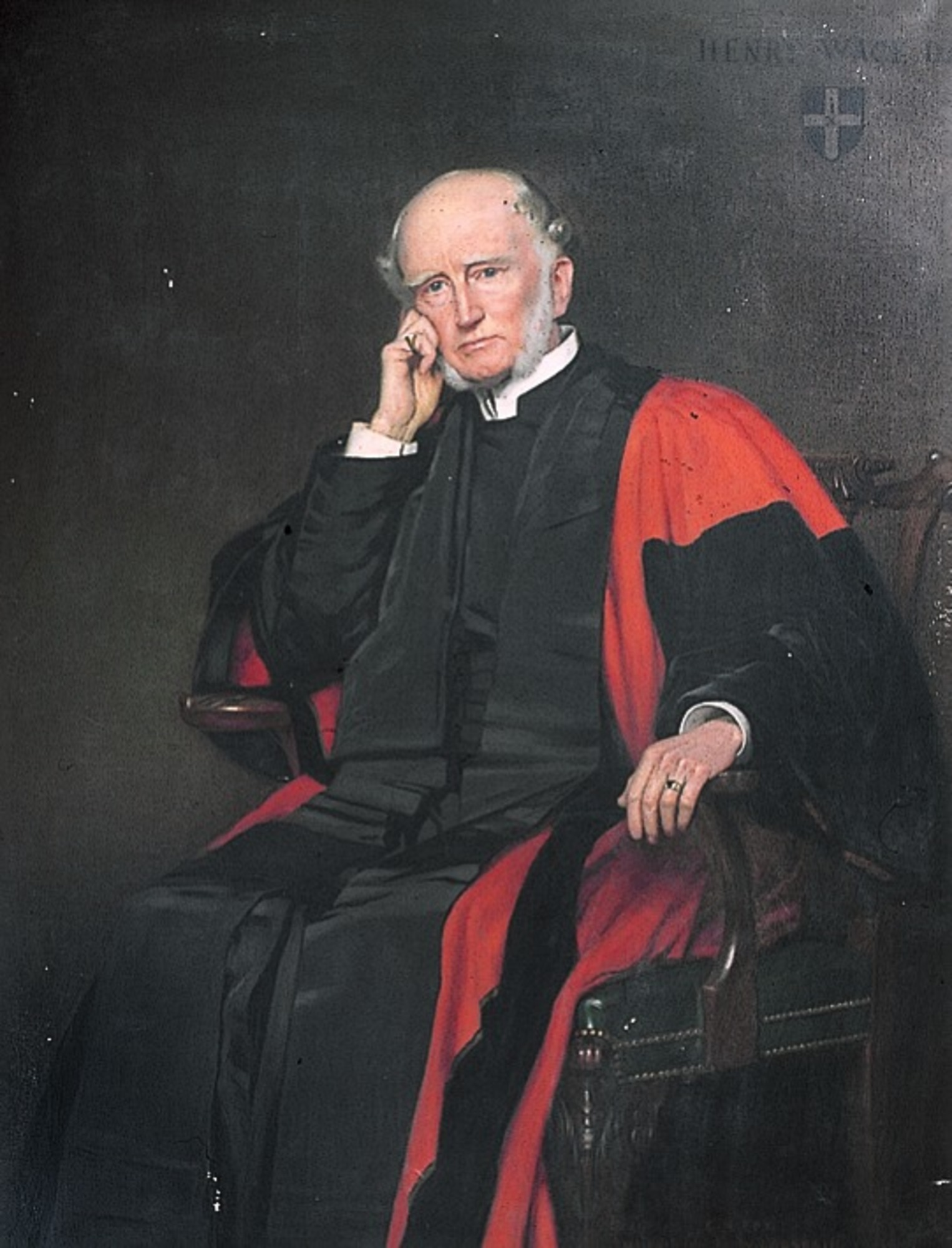
Principal from 1883 to 1897, Henry Wace

The office of "President and Principal of the University" is established by King's College London royal charter as "the Vice-Chancellor and chief academic and executive officer of the University" and the statutes require the president and principal to have the general responsibility to the council for "ensuring that the objects of the University are fulfilled and for maintaining and promoting the efficiency, discipline and good order of the University". The current president and principal, Shitij Kapur, uses the title "Vice-Chancellor and President". The other senior officers of the college include three senior vice presidents, covering the sectors of: academic; health and life science; and operations. There are also five vice presidents covering the areas of: finance (also the college's chief financial officer); education and student success; international, engagement and service; research and innovation; and people and talent.

The council is the supreme governing body of King's College London established under the charter and statutes, comprising up to 20 members. Its membership includes the President of King's College London Students' Union as the student member; seven staff members (including the President and Principal); and 12 lay members who must not be employees of King's. It is supported by a number of standing committees. Christopher Geidt has been the chair of council since 2016.

The academic board is established under the charter as "the body responsible under delegated authority from the Council for the regulation of the academic work of the University in teaching and examining and in research". Under the college ordinances, they are the body responsible for the award of degrees and other academic distinctions of the university. The academic board is chaired by the vice-chancellor and president with ex officio members being the senior vice presidents, vice presidents, executive deans, the president and education vice presidents of the students' union, the dean for doctoral studies, and the Dean of King's College; 45 academic staff elected by the faculties; 3 teaching staff elected from the Centre for International Education & Languages; three members elected from the professional staff; and an elected student representative from each faculty.

The Dean of King's College London is established by the ordinances as being "responsible for ensuring that the College builds upon the Anglican tradition associated with its foundation and, in recognition of the multiethnic and international nature of its community, encourages and supports all its members of all beliefs and backgrounds" and has to be an ordained minister of the Church of England. They are also responsible for the academic direction of the Associateship of King's College and coordinate the college chaplaincy, and the Choir of King's College London, which includes a number of choral scholarships, and to encourage and foster vocations to the Church of England priesthood. The current dean is Ellen Clark-King. That the dean is an ordained person is unusual among British universities, but reflects King's foundation in the tradition of the Church of England in 1829.

The Archbishop of Canterbury was previously King's College London's visitor by right of office owing to the Anglican foundation of King's. Under the 2023 royal charter, the visitor is appointed by the monarch on the representation of the council of the university.

=== Faculties and departments ===
In the 19th century, King's College London had five departments: theological, general literature and science, applied sciences, medical, and military. The theological department provided studies in ecclesiastical history, pastoral theology, and exegesis of the Bible. Languages and literature, history, law and jurisprudence, political economy, commerce, fencing, mathematics, zoology, and natural history were taught within the department of general literature and science, and natural philosophy, geology, mineralogy, and engineering‑related subjects were taught within the department of applied sciences.

As of 2024, King's comprises nine academic faculties: arts and humanities; business; dentistry, oral and craniofacial sciences; law; life sciences and medicine; natural, mathematical and engineering sciences; nursing, midwifery and palliative care; psychiatry, psychology and neuroscience; and social science and public policy.

==== Faculty of arts and humanities ====
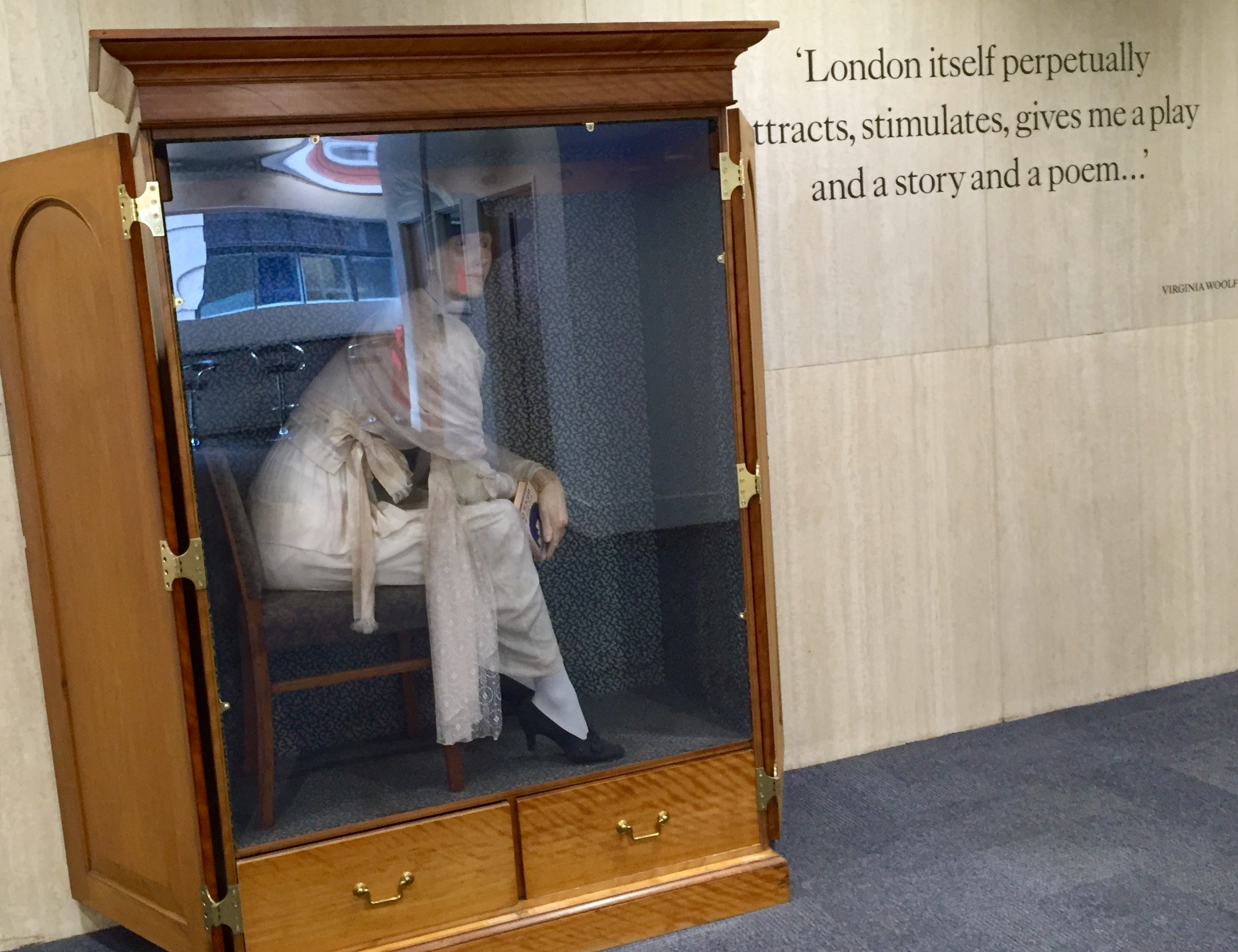
Life-size wax sculpture of Virginia Woolf, a writer and alumna of King's

The faculty of arts and humanities is based on the Strand Campus in the heart of central London, in the vicinity of many cultural institutions, and has established collaborations with many of these, including Shakespeare's Globe, the Courtauld Institute of Art and the Royal Academy of Music. The faculty was formed in 1989 by the amalgamation of the faculties of arts, music and theology.

==== Faculty of dentistry, oral and craniofacial sciences ====
The faculty of dentistry, oral and craniofacial sciences (formerly the dental institute) is the dental school of King's and focuses on understanding disease, enhancing health and restoring function. It is the successor of education carried out at Guy's Dental Hospital, the Royal Dental Hospital's London School of Dental Surgery, and King's College Hospital Dental School. These became a single institution in 1998 with the merger of the united medical and dental schools of Guy's and St Thomas' Hospitals with King's school of medicine and dentistry.

The history of dentistry education at the institutions that would eventually become the faculty started in 1799, when Joseph Fox gave a series of lectures on dental surgery at Guy's Hospital and was appointed dental surgeon in the same year. Thomas Bell succeeded Fox as dental surgeon either in 1817 or 1825. Frederick Newland-Pedley, who was appointed assistant dental surgeon at Guy's Hospital in 1885, advocated the establishment of a dental school within the hospital, and he flooded the two dental schools in London, the Metropolitan School of Dental Science and the London School of Dental Surgery, with patients to prove that a further hospital was needed. In December 1888, Guy's Hospital Dental School was established. Guy's Hospital Dental School was recognised as a school of the University of London in 1901. In the 1970s, since there was a decline in the demand for dental services, the Department of Health of the UK suggested that there should be a decrease in the number of dental undergraduate students as well as the duration of all courses. In response to the recommendations, Royal Dental Hospital of London School of Dental Surgery amalgamated with the Guy's Hospital Dental School of the United Medical and Dental Schools of Guy's and St Thomas' Hospitals on 1 August 1983.

The establishment of King's College Hospital Dental School was proposed by Viscount Hambleden at a Hospital Management Committee meeting on 12 April 1923. The dental school was opened on 12 November 1923 in King's College Hospital. Under the National Health Service Act 1946, King's Medical and Dental School split from King's and became an independent school, but the school remerged with King's in 1983. The school further merged with the United Medical and Dental Schools of Guy's and St Thomas' Hospitals in 1998.

==== Faculty of life sciences and medicine ====
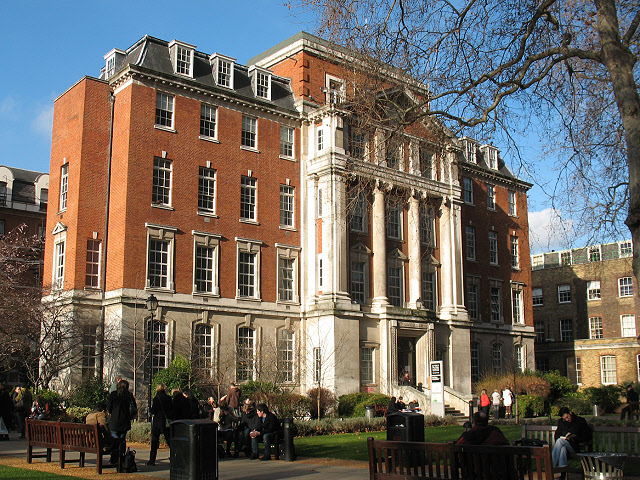
The faculty of life sciences and medicine is located at four campuses including Guy's Campus

The faculty of life sciences and medicine was created as a result of the merger of the school of medicine with the school of biomedical sciences in 2014.

There are two schools of education in the Faculty of Life Sciences and Medicine: the GKT School of Medical Education is responsible for the medical education and training of students on the MBBS programme, and the school of bioscience education is responsible for the biomedical and health professions education and training. The faculty is divided into schools of basic and medical biosciences; biomedical engineering and imaging sciences; cancer and pharmaceutical science, cardiovascular medicine and sciences; immunology and microbial sciences; life course sciences; and population health sciences.

==== Institute of Psychiatry, Psychology and Neuroscience ====
The Institute of Psychiatry, Psychology and Neuroscience (IoPPN) is a faculty and a research institution dedicated to discovering what causes mental illness and diseases of the brain, and to help identify new treatments of the diseases. The institute is the largest centre for research and postgraduate education in psychiatry, psychology and neuroscience in Europe. Originally established in 1924 as the Maudsley Hospital Medical School, the institute changed its name to the Institute of Psychiatry in 1948, merged with King's College London in 1997, and was renamed IoPPN in 2014.

==== Dickson Poon School of Law ====
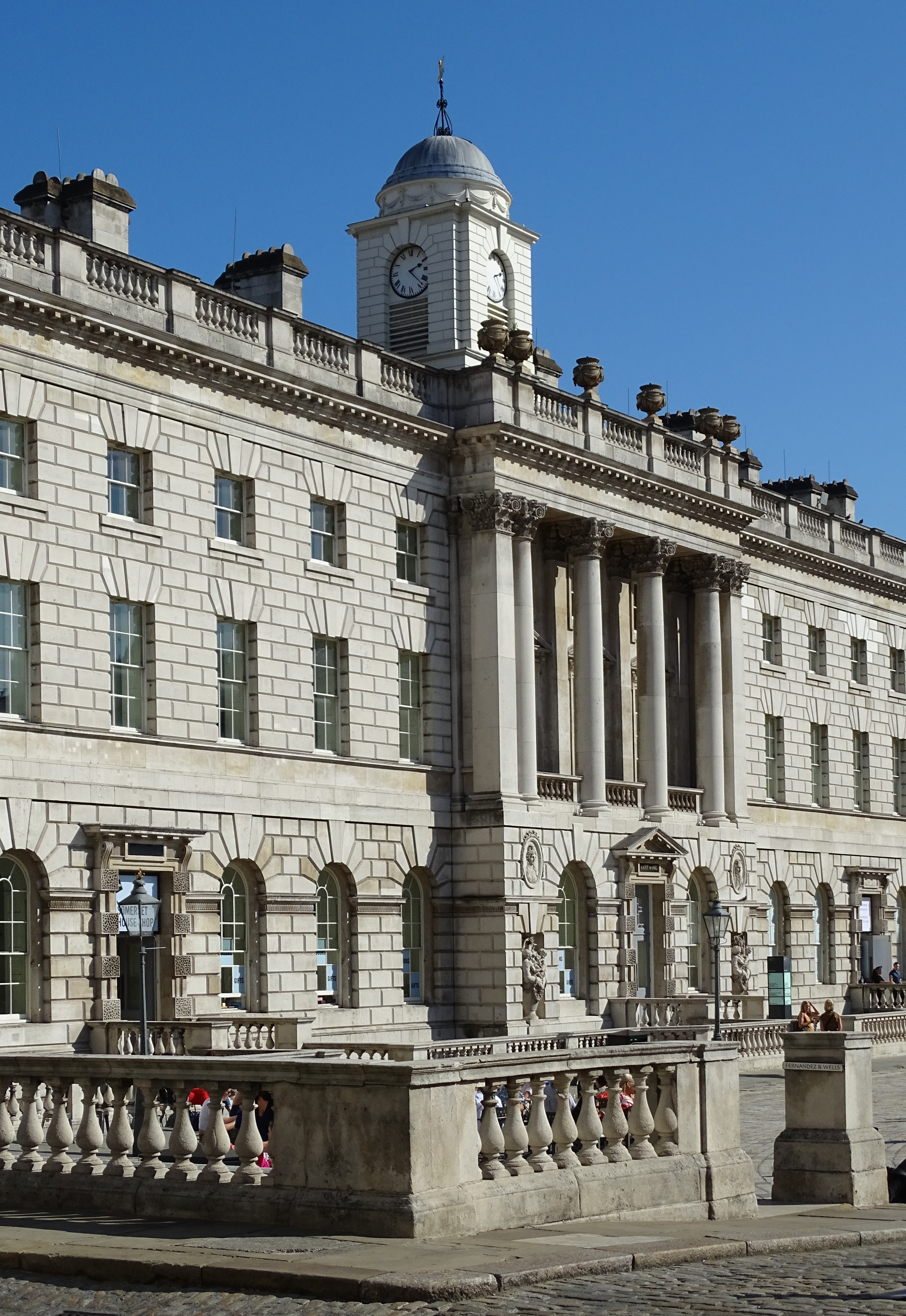
Somerset House – showing the East Wing, a part of the Strand Campus, which houses the Dickson Poon School of Law.

The Dickson Poon School of Law is the law school of King's. Law has been taught at King's since 1831 and the faculty of laws was founded (in association with the London School of Economics) in 1909, becoming the school of law in 1991. The school includes various research centres and groups which serve as focal points for research activity.

==== Faculty of Natural, Mathematical & Engineering Sciences ====
The faculty includes the departments of chemistry, engineering, informatics, mathematics, and physics.

The teaching of experimental physics at King's was the first in England and professors of experimental physics have included James Clerk Maxwell, Harold A. Wilson, Charles Glover Barkla, Sir Owen Richardson, Sir Edward Appleton and Sir Charles Ellis, three of whom became Nobel laureates.

John Frederic Daniell was the first professor of chemistry at King's and established the first chemical laboratory in 1834. Chemistry was originally part of the medical department and became a separate department in 1958; this closed in 2003 due to a decline in student numbers and reduced funding. The department was reestablished in 2012.

Teaching of engineering at King's was established in 1838, a year after Durham, making it the second school of engineering established in the United Kingdom. The department of engineering was the largest engineering school in the UK in 1893. The division of engineering was closed in 2013, with the current department of engineering being established in 2019.

==== Florence Nightingale Faculty of Nursing, Midwifery and Palliative Care ====
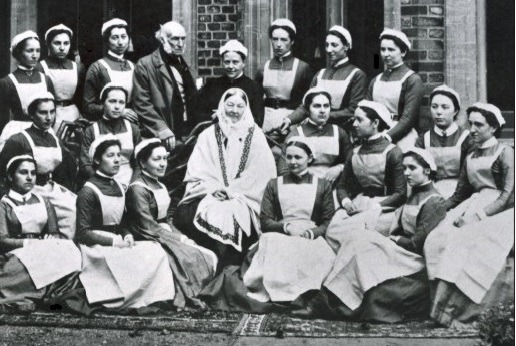
Florence Nightingale and her class of nurses

The Florence Nightingale Faculty of Nursing, Midwifery and Palliative Care is a school for nurses and midwives. It also conducts nursing research and provides continuing professional development and postgraduate programmes. Formerly known as the Nightingale Training School and Home for Nurses, the faculty was established by Florence Nightingale in 1860, and was the first nursing school in the world to be continuously connected to a fully serving hospital and medical school.

The Nightingale Training School amalgamated with the Olive Haydon School of Midwifery and the Thomas Guy and Lewisham School of Nursing between 1991 and 1993 to form the Nightingale College of Health, which became part of King's in 1993. In 2017 it merged with the Cicely Saunders Institute, a centre for research and education in palliative care, to become the Florence Nightingale Faculty of Nursing, Midwifery and Palliative Care.

==== Faculty of social science and public policy ====
The faculty of social science and public policy contains the schools of politics and economics; education, communication and society; global affairs; security studies; the international school for government; and the policy institute.

The department of war studies, within the school of security studies, is unique in the UK and is supported by research facilities such as the King's Centre for Strategic Communications, Liddell Hart Centre for Military Archives and the King's Centre for Military Health Research.

==== King's Business School ====
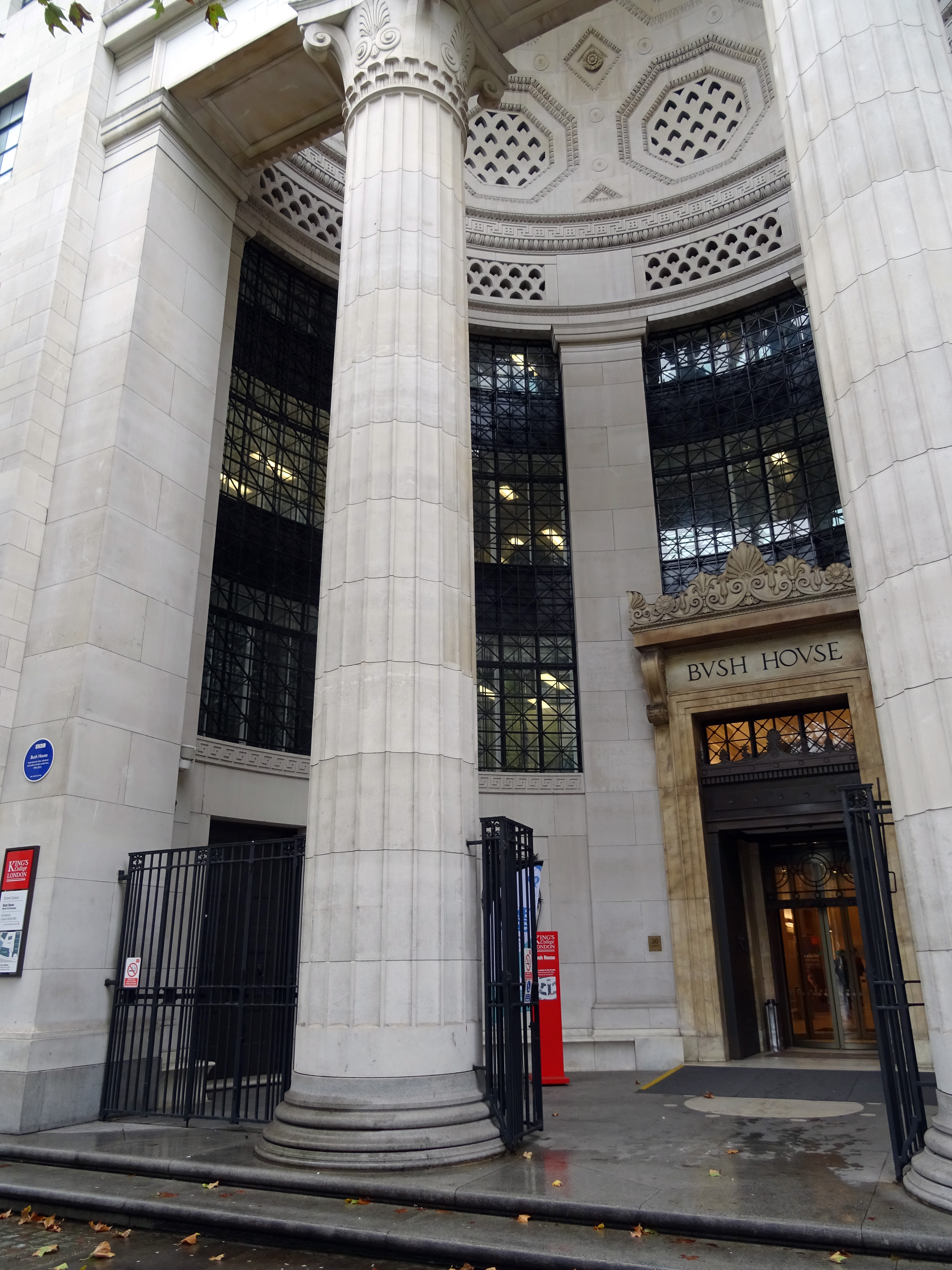
King's Business School is based in Bush House, Aldwych in Central London

King's Business School was established in 1989. In 2017 it became a faculty of the college as King's Business School and moved into Bush House. From 2023, it has held triple accreditation from the Association of MBAs, the EFMD Quality Improvement System and the Association to Advance Collegiate Schools of Business.

=== Finances ===
In the fiscal year ending 31 July 2024, King's had a total income of £1.271 billion (2022/23 – £1.230 million) and total expenditure of £944 million (2022/23 – £1.102 billion). Key sources of income included £630.5 million from tuition fees and education contracts (2022/23 – £607.8 million), £144.9 million from funding body grants (2022/23 – £148.3 million), £256.9 million from research grants and contracts (2022/23 – £236.3 million), £26.7 million from investment income (2022/23 – £18 million) and £23.7 million from donations and endowments (2022/23 – £28.9 million).

At year end, King's had endowments of £324.8 million (2022/23 – £301 million) and total net assets of £1.671 billion (2022/23 – £1.323 billion). It holds the fourth-largest endowment of any university in the UK behind only Oxford, Cambridge and Edinburgh.

=== Coat of arms ===
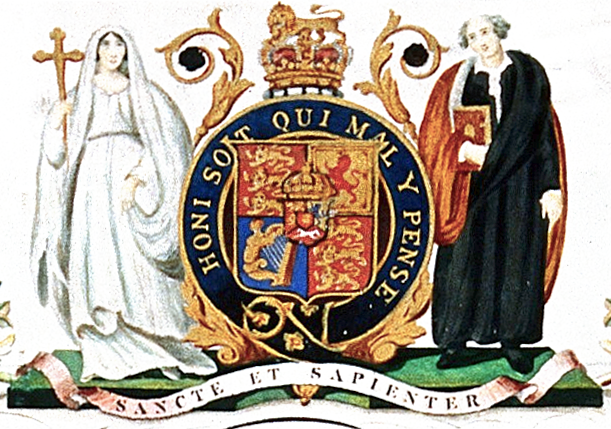
Historic King's College coat of arms used from 1829 to 1989

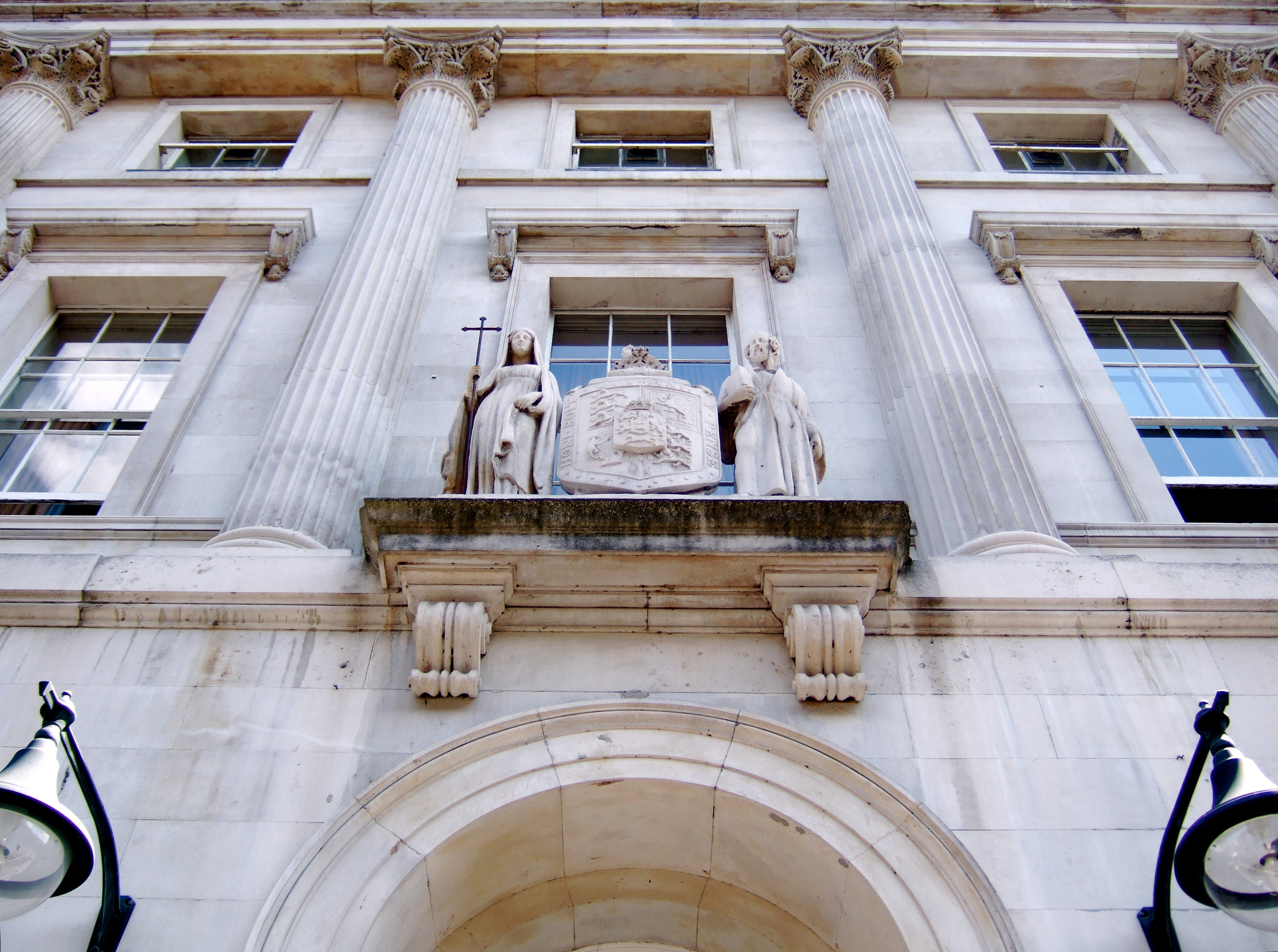
Entrance and coat of arms of the 19th century King's Building, Strand Campus

The coat of arms displayed on the 1829 King's College London charter is that of George IV. The shield depicts the royal coat of arms together with an inescutcheon of the House of Hanover, while the supporters embody King's motto of sancte et sapienter. No correspondence is believed to have survived regarding the choice of this coat of arms, either in King's archives or at the College of Arms, and a variety of unofficial adaptations were used. The current arms came into use in October 1989 but received royal assent at the later date of 21 March 1995 for use of 'a Royal Crown proper'. The arms were developed following the mergers with Queen Elizabeth College and Chelsea College in 1985 and incorporate aspects of their heraldry. The arms in heraldic terminology, are described as follows:

Escutcheon (of current arms):

Or on a Pale Azure between two Lions rampant respectant Gules an Anchor Gold ensigned by a Royal Crown proper on a Chief Argent an Ancient Lamp proper inflamed Gold between two Blazing Hearths also proper.

Crest (of current arms):

On a Helm with a Wreath Or and Azure Upon a Book proper rising from a Coronet Or the rim set with jewels two Azure (one manifest) four Vert (two manifest) and two Gules a demi Lion Gules holding a Rod of Aesculapius.

Supporters (of historic arms):

Dexter a female figure habited Azure the cloak lined coif and sleeves Argent holding in the exterior hand a Lond Cross botony Gold and sinister a male figure the Long Coat Azure trimmed with Sable proper shirt Argent holding in the interior hand a Book proper.

==== Coats of arms of the medical schools ====
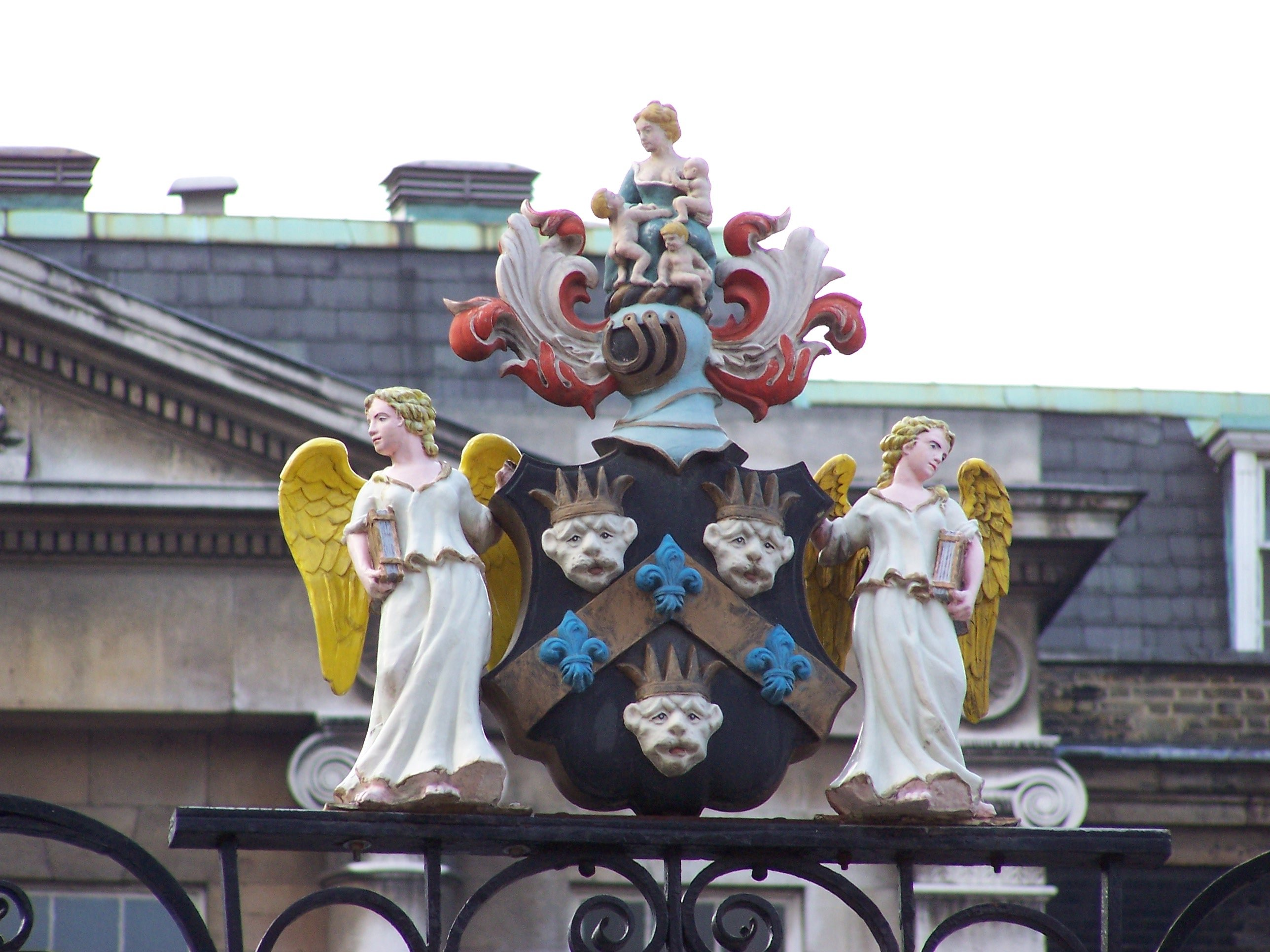
Guy's coat of arms, displayed above the entrance to Guy's Campus

Although the St Thomas's Hospital Medical School and Guy's Medical School became legal bodies separate from St Thomas' Hospital and Guy's Hospital in 1948, the tradition of using the hospitals' shields and coat of arms continues today.

In 1949, St Thomas's Hospital Medical School was granted its own coat of arms. However, the St Thomas' Hospital coat of arms has still been used. Guy's Medical School proposed to apply for its own coat of arms after separating from Guy's Hospital, yet the school decided to continue to use Guy's Hospital's arms in 1954. The two medical schools merged in 1982 and became the United Medical and Dental Schools of Guy's and St Thomas' Hospitals (UMDS). Simon Argles, secretary of UMDS, said that because of the name of the medical school it was more appropriate to use the hospital's coat of arms.

UMDS merged with King's College Hospital to become Guy's, King's and St Thomas' School of Medicine in 1998. The shields of Guy's and St Thomas' hospitals are used in conjunction with King's shield in the medical schools' publications and graduation materials.

=== Affiliations and partnerships ===
King's College London is a member institution and was one of the two founding colleges of the federal University of London. In 1998, King's joined the Russell Group, an association of 24 public research universities established in 1994. King's is also a member of the Institutional Network of the Universities from the Capitals of Europe (UNICA), a network of higher education institutions based in European capital cities, the Guild of European Research-Intensive Universities, the Circle U European University alliance, the Association of Commonwealth Universities (ACU), the European University Association (EUA) and Universities UK.

King's is typically regarded as part of the "golden triangle", a grouping of research universities located in the English cities of Cambridge, Oxford and London that generally also includes the universities of Cambridge and Oxford, Imperial College London, the London School of Economics, and University College London. (Note: King's is included in some listing but not in others)

King's College London is also a part of King's Health Partners, an academic health science centre comprises Guy's and St Thomas' NHS Foundation Trust, King's College Hospital NHS Foundation Trust, South London and Maudsley NHS Foundation Trust and King's College London itself. King's is a participant and one of the founding members of the Francis Crick Institute. Furthermore, launched in 2014, MedCity is the collaboration between King's and the other two main science universities in London, Imperial College and University College London.

In 2016, King's College London, together with Arizona State University and University of New South Wales, formed the PLuS Alliance, an international university alliance to address global challenges. King's was also a founding member of FutureLearn, a massive open online course platform established in December 2012.

King's offers joint degrees with many universities and other institutions, including Columbia University, University of Paris I, University of Hong Kong, National University of Singapore, Royal Academy of Music, British Library, Tate Modern, Shakespeare's Globe, National Gallery, National Portrait Gallery and British Museum.

In the field of mathematics, King's College London has a joint venture with Imperial College London and University College London running the London School of Geometry and Number Theory (LSGNT), which is an EPSRC-funded Centre for Doctoral Training (CDT). The LSGNT offers a wide range of 4-year PhD research projects in different aspects of number theory, geometry and topology.

Another partnership King's College London has with both Imperial College London and University College London is the field of Nanotechnology where all 3 universities jointly run the London Centre for Nanotechnology (LCN). LCN is a multidisciplinary research centre in physical and biomedical nanotechnology focused on exploitation and commercialisation of research generated in the relevant fields, established in 2003, which King's joined in 2018.

King's College London joined the SES engineering and physical sciences research alliance in 2016, which includes the universities of Cambridge, Oxford and Southampton, Imperial College London, Queen Mary University of London, and University College London as members. King's College London is also a member of the Thomas Young Centre, an alliance of London research groups working on the theory and simulation of materials, along with Imperial College London, University College London and Queen Mary University of London.

The university is also a member of the University of London Screen Studies Group with other institutions from the University of London.

== Academic profile ==
=== Admissions ===
UCAS Admission Statistics
	2025	2024	2023	2022	2021
Applications (Note: Main scheme applications, International and UK)	75,835	68,510	69,300	70,090	67,390
Accepted	8,375	7,780	6,810	7,320	8,460
Applications/Accepted Ratio	9.1	8.8	10.2	9.6	8.0
Overall Offer Rate (%)	50.5	46.0	41.7	41.7	54.7
↳ UK only (%) (Note: UK domiciled applicants)	43.2	43.3	37.7	38.6	52.2
Average Entry Tariff	—N/a	—N/a	161	168	171
↳ Top three exams (Note: The maximum tariff score for three exams is 168: the equivalent of A*A*A* at A-Level, 777 at HL for the IB Diploma Programme, or AAA at Advanced Higher)	—N/a	—N/a	148.3	150.9	151.3

HESA Student Body Composition (2024/25)
Domicile and Ethnicity	Total
British White (Note: Not be confused solely with White British)	27%
British Ethnic Minorities (Note: Includes those who indicate that they identify as Asian, Black, Mixed Heritage, Arab or any other ethnicity except White.)	35%
International EU	6%
International Non-EU	33%
Undergraduate Widening Participation Indicators
Female	65%
Independent School	14%
Low Participation Areas (Note: Calculated from the Polar4 measure, using Quintile1, in England and Wales. Calculated from the Scottish Index of Multiple Deprivation (SIMD) measure, using SIMD20, in Scotland.)	6%

In the 2024/25 academic year, the student body consisted of 40,870 students, composed of 23,200 undergraduates and 17,670 postgraduate students. The university is consistently designated as a 'high-tariff' institution by the Department for Education, with the average undergraduate entrant to the university in recent years amassing between 148 and 151 UCAS Tariff points in their top three pre-university qualifications – the equivalent of AAA to A*AA at A-Level. Based on 2022/23 HESA entry standards data published in domestic league tables, which include a broad range of qualifications beyond the top three exam grades, the average student at King's College London achieved 168 points – the 18th highest in the country. In 2022, the university gave offers of admission to 39.3% of its applicants, the 8th lowest across the country.

=== Teaching ===
King's academic year runs from the last Monday in September to the first Friday in June. Different faculties and departments follow different term structures. For example, the academic year of the Mathematics School and the Department of War Studies is divided into three terms (Autumn, Spring and Summer); whilst the Faculty of Arts & Humanities academic year runs over two semesters.

=== Graduation ===
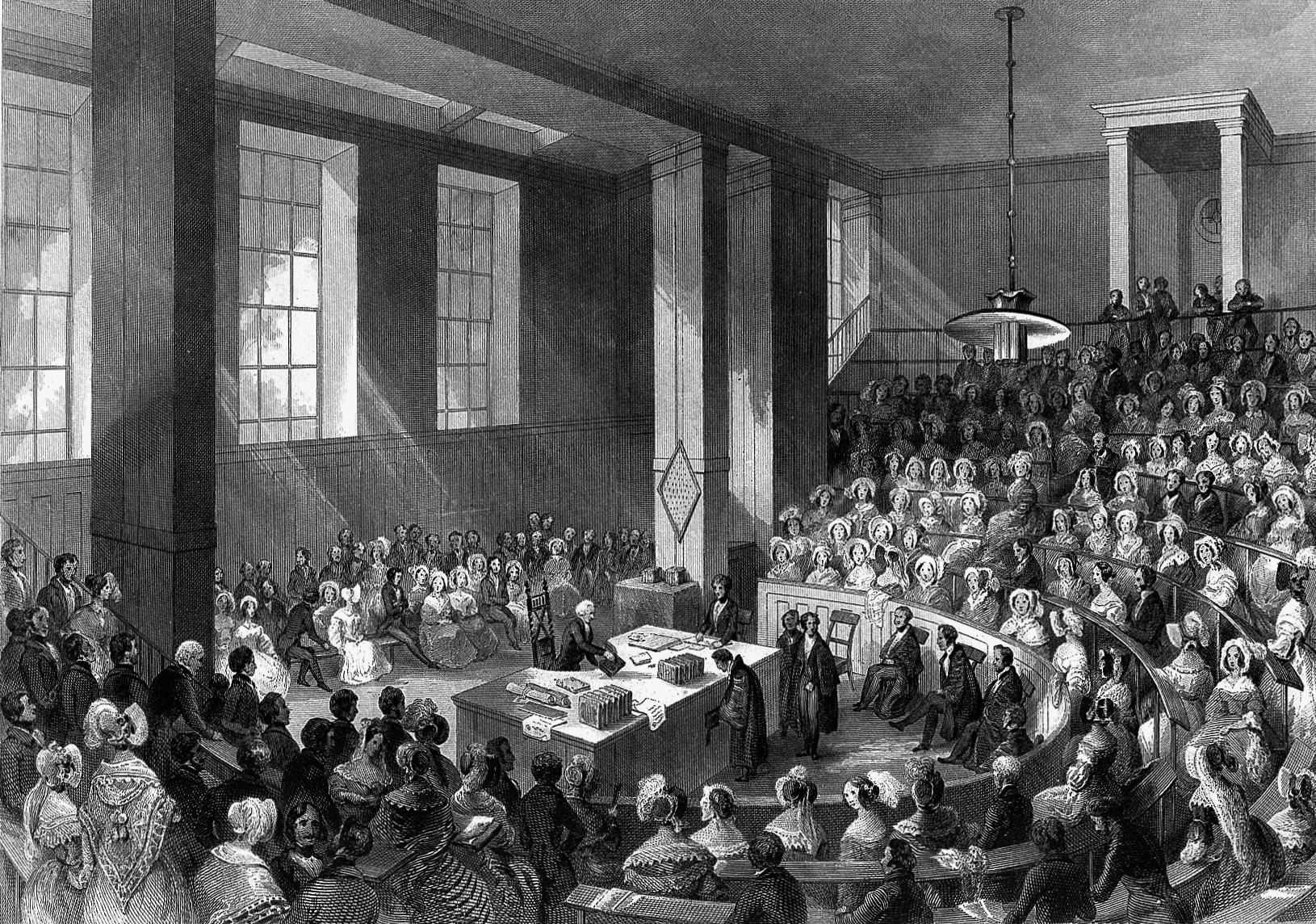
Prize-giving day in 1841

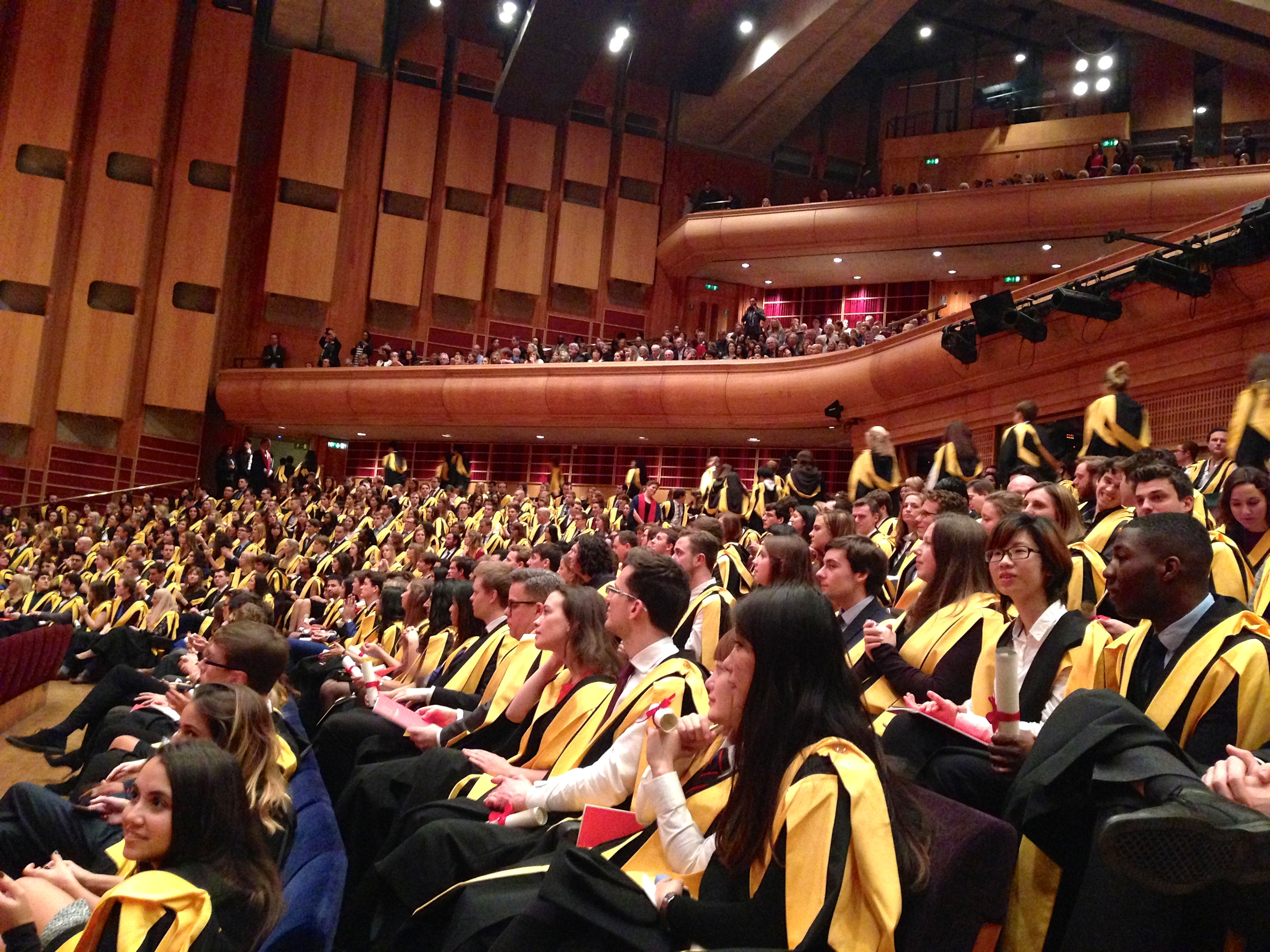
King's graduands with academic dress designed by Vivienne Westwood

Graduation ceremonies are held in January (winter) and June or July (summer), with ceremonies for non-medical students held at the Royal Festival Hall in the Southbank Centre, near the Waterloo Campus. Ceremonies were held at the Royal Albert Hall until 1992 and then at the Barbican Centre until 2018.

Owing to St Thomas's Medical School roots that could be traced to St Mary Overie Priory, students from the GKT School of Medical Education and Faculty of Dental, Oral & Craniofacial Sciences graduate from Southwark Cathedral adjacent to Guy's Campus.

After being granted the power to award its own degrees separately from the University of London in 2006, graduates began wearing King's College London academic dress in 2008. King's graduates have since worn gowns designed by Vivienne Westwood.

=== Research ===
In 2023/24 King's had a total research income of £256.9 million, of which £69.5 million came from research councils; £57.2 million from the UK central government; £14.6 million from UK industry; £58.1 million from UK charitable bodies; £25.3 million from EU sources; £32.2 million from other sources.

Following the 2021 Research Excellence Framework (REF), which assessed the quality of research in UK higher education institutions, King's was ranked 9th by GPA and 6th for research power by Times Higher Education.

=== Medicine ===
Medical research at King's College London is spread across multiple faculties, particularly the Faculty of Dentistry, Oral and Craniofacial Sciences, the Florence Nightingale Faculty of Nursing, Midwifery and Palliative Care, and the Faculty of Life Sciences and Medicine.

King's claims to be the largest centre for healthcare education in Europe. The Faculty of Life Sciences and Medicine has three main teaching hospitals – Guy's Hospital, King's College Hospital and St Thomas' Hospital – and a branch campus in Portsmouth run in collaboration with the University of Portsmouth. King's College London Dental Institute was the largest dental school in Europe as of 2010. The Florence Nightingale School of Nursing & Midwifery, which became part of King's in 1993, is the oldest professional school of nursing in the world.

King's is a major centre for biomedical research. It is a founding member of King's Health Partners, one of the largest academic health sciences centres in Europe with a turnover of over £2 billion and approximately 25,000 employees. It also is home to the Medical Research Council's MRC Centre for Neurodevelopmental Disorders, and is part of two of the twelve biomedical research centres established by the National Institute for Health and Care Research (NIHR) in England – the NIHR Biomedical Research Centre at Guy's and St Thomas' NHS Foundation Trust and King's College London, and the NIHR Biomedical Research Centre at the South London and Maudsley NHS Foundation Trust and King's College London.

The Drug Control Centre at King's was established in 1978 and is the only WADA accredited anti-doping laboratory in the UK and holds the official UK contract for running doping tests on UK athletes. In 1997, it became the first International Olympic Committee accredited laboratory to meet the ISO/IEC 17025 quality standard. The centre was the anti-doping facility for the London 2012 Olympic and Paralympic Games.

=== Libraries ===
==== Maughan Library ====
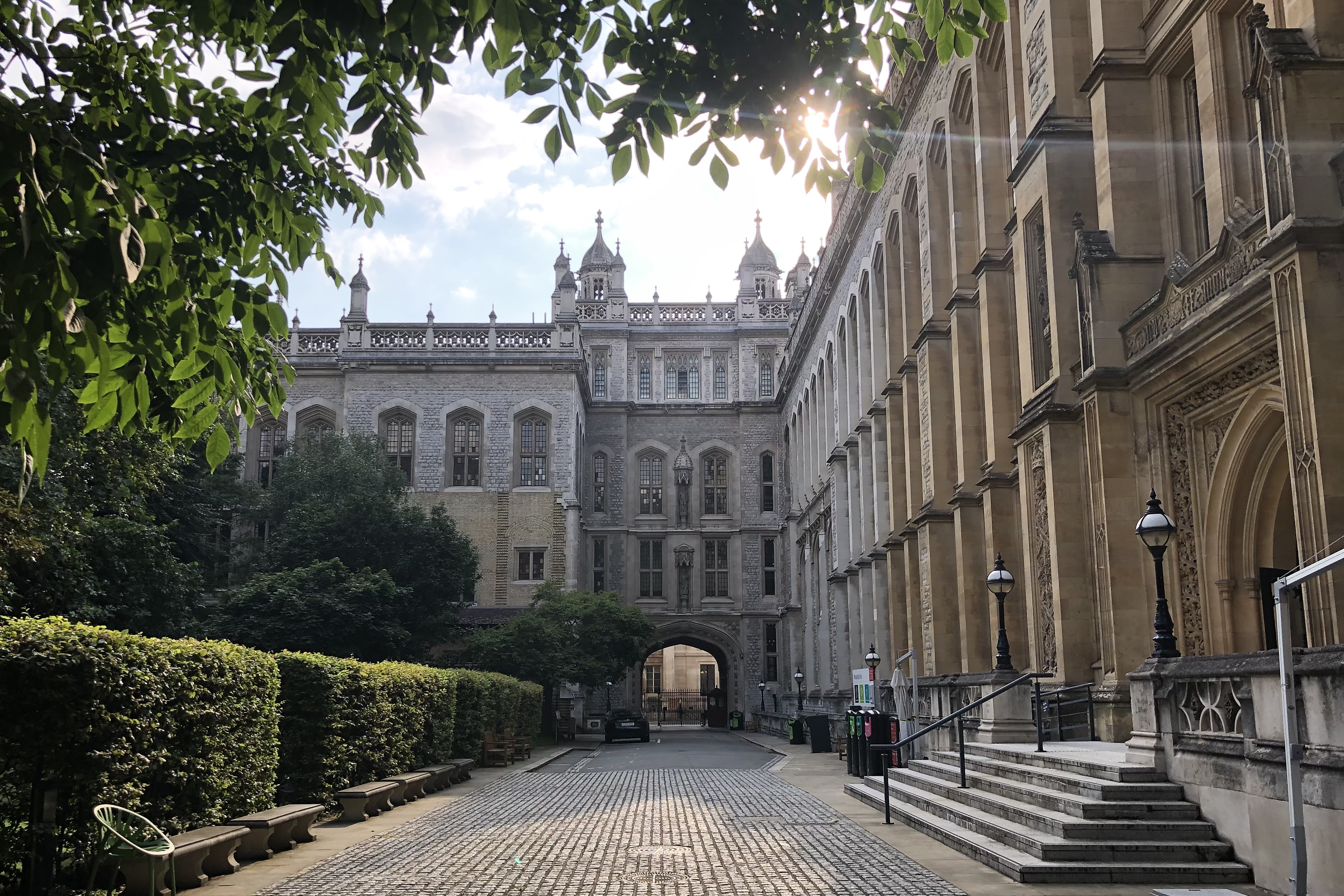
The Maughan Library courtyard

The Maughan Library is King's largest library and is housed in the Grade II* listed 19th century gothic revival former Public Record Office building designed by Sir James Pennethorne, situated on Chancery Lane near the Strand Campus. The building is home to collections supporting humanities, law and science. It also houses the special collections and rare books within the Foyle Library (see below). Inside the library is the dodecagonal Round Reading Room, inspired by the reading room of the British Museum (now home to the humanities reference collection), and the former Chapel of the Masters of the Rolls (renamed the Weston Room following a donation from the Garfield Weston Foundation) with its stained glass windows, mosaic floor and monuments, including a Renaissance terracotta figure by Pietro Torrigiano of John Yonge, Master of the Rolls, who died in 1516.

==== Other libraries ====
- Foyle Special Collections Library: Situated inside the Maughan Library, the special collections library houses a collection of 200,000 printed works as well as maps, slides, sound recordings and manuscript material, including 17 incunabula. The Foyle Special Collections Library also houses a number of special collections, range in date from the 15th century to present, and in subject from human anatomy to Modern Greek poetry. The Foreign and Commonwealth Office (FCO) Historical Collection is the largest collection contains material from the former FCO Library. The collection was a working tool used by the British government to inform and influence foreign and colonial policy. Transferred to King's in 2007, the FCO Historical Collection contains over 80,000 items including books, pamphlets, manuscript, and photographic material. The Medical Collection include the historical library collections of the constituent medical schools and institutes of King's. The Rare Books Collection holds 12,000 printed books, including a 1483 Venice printing of Silius Italicus's Punica, first editions of Charles Dickens' novels, and the 1937 (first) edition of George Orwell's The Road to Wigan Pier.
- Archives Reading Room: Situated in the King's Building on the Strand campus, this includes the college archives and the Liddell Hart Centre for Military Archives. The college archives include institutional archives of King's since 1828, archives of institutions and schools that were created by or have merged with King's, and records relating to the history of medicine. The Liddell Hart Centre for Military Archives, established in 1964, holds the private papers of over 800 senior British defence personnel who held office since 1900.
- Franklin-Wilkins Library: Situated on the Waterloo Campus, the library supports nursing and midwifery students and law students, with holdings on management, bioscience and education.
- Wills Library: Situated in the Hodgkin Building at Guy's Campus, it was originally the main library for the Guy's Hospital Medical School. The Wills Library was a gift in 1903 by the former governor of Guy's Hospital, the late Sir Frederick Wills and it was opened as the Medical School Library. Many books, archives and documents that were kept in the Wills Library, such as Guy's committee minute books, have been moved to the King's College London Archives in 2004, although the library still contains a collection of books in locked cabinets that can be retrieved by request.
- New Hunt's House Library: Situated on the Guy's Campus, the library covers all aspects of biomedical science.
- St Thomas' House Library: Situated at St Thomas' Campus, the library has resources on complimentary clinical healthcare and a variety of study spaces.
- Institute of Psychiatry, Psychology & Neuroscience Library: Situated on the Denmark Hill Campus, the IoPPN library is one of the largest psychiatric libraries in Western Europe.
- Weston Education Centre Library: Situated on the Denmark Hill Campus, the library supports teaching and research in the faculties of medicine and dentistry. It also supports clinical work and research in the King's College Hospital NHS Foundation Trust and the South London and Maudsley NHS Foundation Trust.

Additionally, King's students and staff have full access to Senate House Library, the central library for the University of London and the School of Advanced Study. Undergraduate and postgraduate students also have reference access to libraries of other University of London institutions under the University of London Libraries Access Agreement.

=== Museums, galleries and collections ===
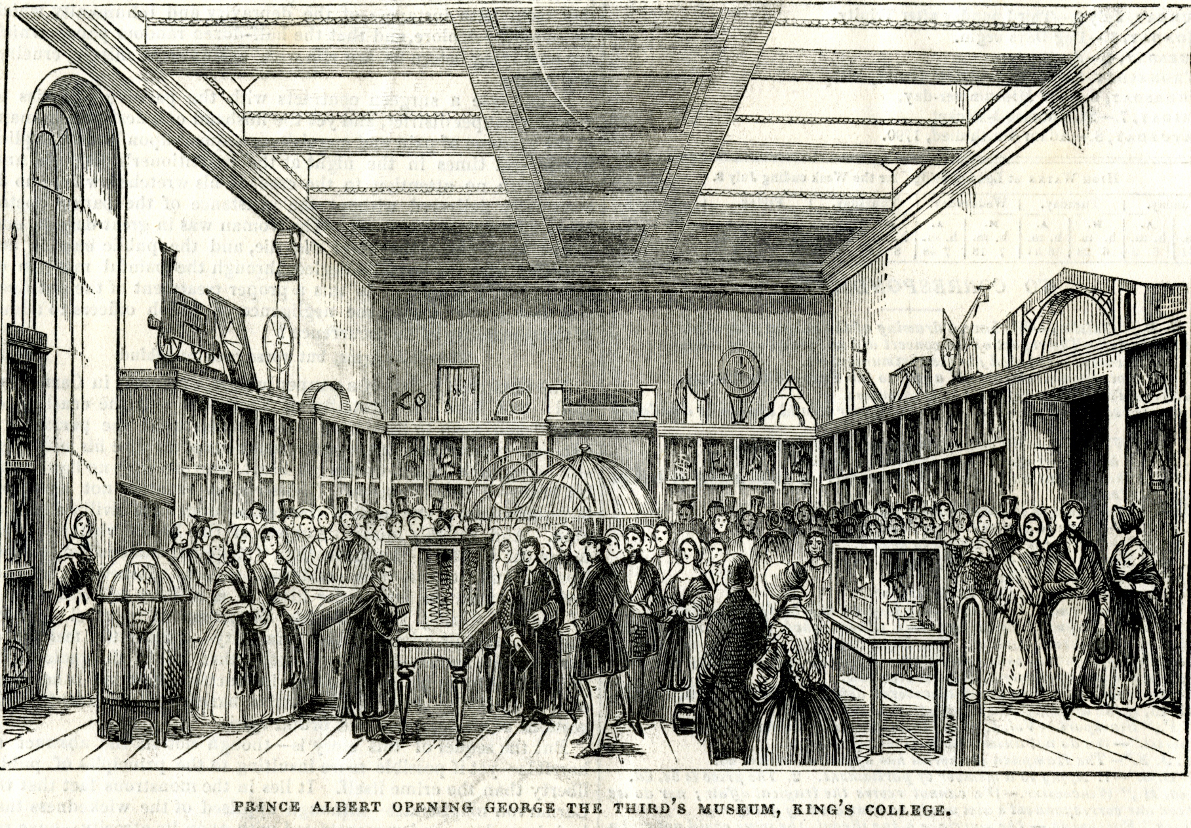
Opening of the King George III Museum by Albert, Prince Consort on 1 July 1843

King's operates two museums: the Gordon Museum of Pathology and the Museum of Life Sciences, neither of which are open to the public. The Gordon Museum collection dates back to the opening of the medical school at Guy's Hospital in 1826; the current museum was opened by the hospital in 1905. The Gordon Museum says it is the largest medical museum in the United Kingdom, with a collection of approximately 8,000 pathological specimens, artefacts, models and paintings, including Astley Cooper's specimens and Sir Joseph Lister's antiseptic spray. The Museum of Life Sciences was founded in 2009 adjacent to the Gordon Museum, and holds historic biological and pharmaceutical collections from the colleges that are now part of King's College London.

Between 1843 and 1927, the King George III Museum was a museum within King's College London which housed the collections of scientific instruments of George III and eminent nineteenth-century scientists (including Sir Charles Wheatstone and Charles Babbage). Due to space constraints, much of the museum's collections were transferred on loan to the Science Museum in London or kept in King's College London Archives.

The Anatomy Museum was a museum situated on the 6th floor of the King's Building at the Strand Campus. The Anatomy Theatre was built next door to the museum in 1927, where anatomical dissections and demonstrations took place. The Anatomy Museum's collection includes casts of injuries, leather models, skins of animals from Western Australia donated to the museum in 1846, and casts of heads of John Bishop and Thomas Williams, the murderers in the Italian Boy's murder in 1831. The last dissection in the Anatomy Theatre was performed in 1997. The Anatomy Theatre and Museum was renovated and refurbished in 2009, and is now a facility for teaching, research and performance at King's.

Science Gallery London is a public science centre on the Guy's Campus. Admission to exhibitions and events at the centre is free of charge. It opened in 2018 and will close at the end of July 2026.

=== Reputation and ranking ===
Rankings
National rankings
- Complete (2027): 16
- Guardian (2027): 19
- Times / Sunday Times (2027): 29

Global rankings
- ARWU (2026): 67
- QS (2027): 37
- THE (2026): 38

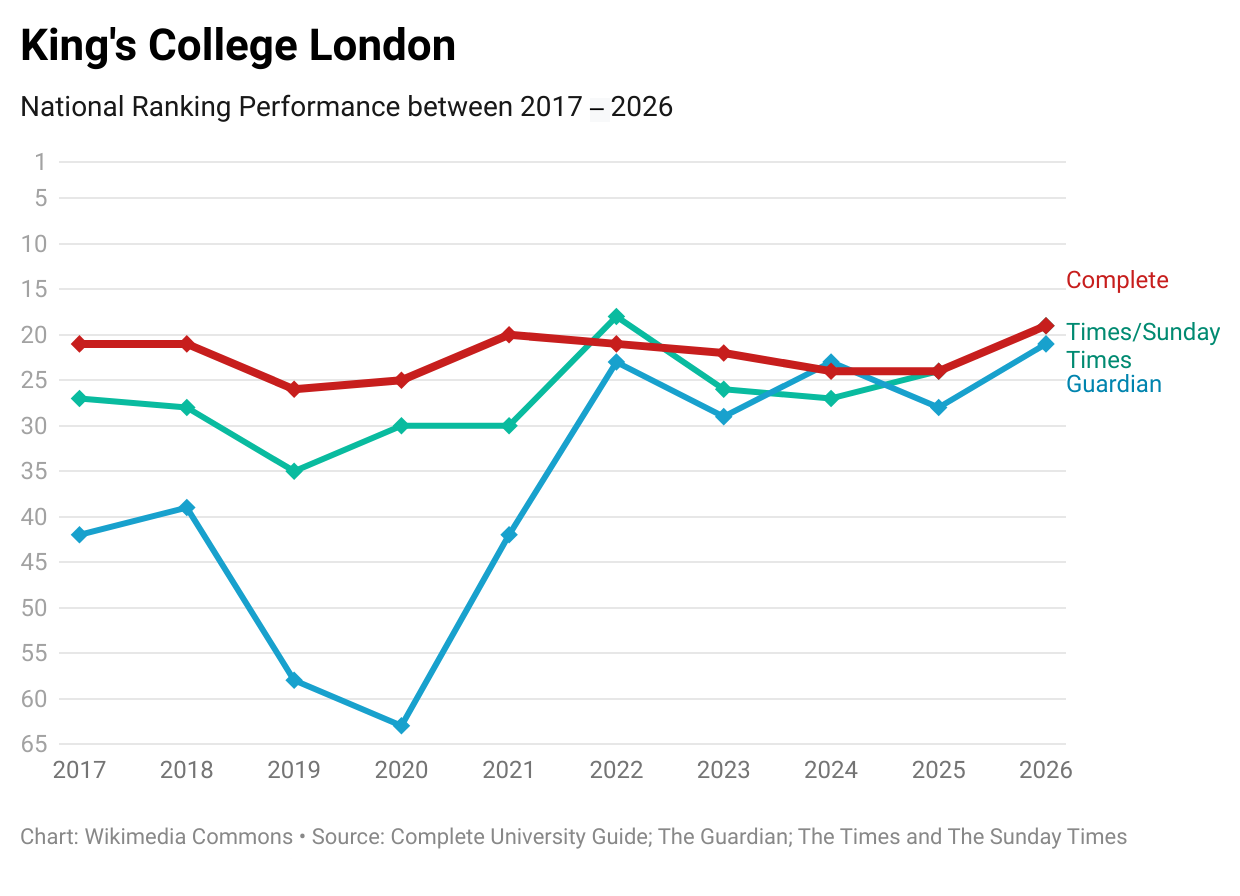
King's College London's national league table performance over the past ten years

King's was Sunday Times University of the Year for 2010 to 2011.

According to the 2025 Complete University Guide, 16 subjects offered by King's rank within the top 10 nationally, including Health Studies (1st), Social Policy (2nd), Business & Management Studies (3rd), Anthropology (4th), Law (5th), Music (6th), Classics (6th), Economics (8th), Politics (8th), Communication & Media Studies (8th), Food Science (9th), Philosophy (9th), Dentistry (9th), Biological Sciences (10th), History (10th), and Computer Science (10th). The Guardian University Guide 2021 ranks King's in the top ten in 6 subjects, including Psychology (2nd), Politics (5th), Law (6th), Anatomy & physiology (8th), Media & film studies (9th), and Philosophy (9th). The Times Higher Education ranks King's College London the top 20 universities in the world for Psychology (11th), and Clinical, pre-clinical & health (16th) in the 2021 World University Rankings by subject.

Among global university rankings, King's is ranked 31st by the 2026 QS World University Rankings, 36th equal by the 2025 world university rankings of the Times Higher Education, 36th equal by the 2024 U.S. News & World Report Best Global Universities Rankings, 53rd by the 2024 Academic Ranking of World Universities (ARWU).

King's was ranked 7th in the UK for Graduate Employability in the Times Higher Education's Global Employability University Ranking 2023. King's was further recognised by the High Fliers' Graduate Market Report 2024 as one of the top universities targeted by leading UK employers. This was reaffirmed by the Teaching Excellence Framework (2023) which gave King's a gold rating for student outcomes.

=== Associateship of King's College ===
The Associateship of King's College (AKC) dates to its foundation in 1829 and was first awarded in 1835. It was designed to reflect the twin objectives of King's College's 1829 royal charter to maintain the connection between "sound religion and useful learning" and to teach the "doctrines and duties of Christianity".

Today, the AKC is a modern tradition that offers an inclusive, research-led programme of lectures that gives students the opportunities to engage with religious, philosophical and ethical issues alongside their main degree course. Graduates of King's College London may be eligible to be elected as 'Associates' of King's College by the authority of King's College London council, delegated to the academic board. After election, they are entitled to use the post-nominal letters "AKC".

=== Fellowship of King's College ===
The Fellowship of King's College (FKC) is the highest award that can be bestowed upon an individual by King's College London. The award of the fellowship is governed by a statute of King's College London and reflects distinguished service to King's by a member of staff, conspicuous service to King's, or the achievement of distinction by those who were at one time closely associated with King's College London.

The proposal to establish a fellowship of King's was first considered in 1847. John Allen, a former chaplain of King's, was the first FKC. Each fellow had to pay two guineas for the fellowship privilege initially, but the fee ceased in 1850. A wide variety of people were elected as fellows of King's, including former principal Alfred Barry, former King's student then professor Thorold Rogers, architect William Burges and ornithologist Robert Swinhoe. The first women fellows were elected in 1904. Lilian Faithfull, vice-principal of the King's Ladies' Department from 1894 to 1906, was one of the first women fellows.

== Student life ==
=== Students' union ===
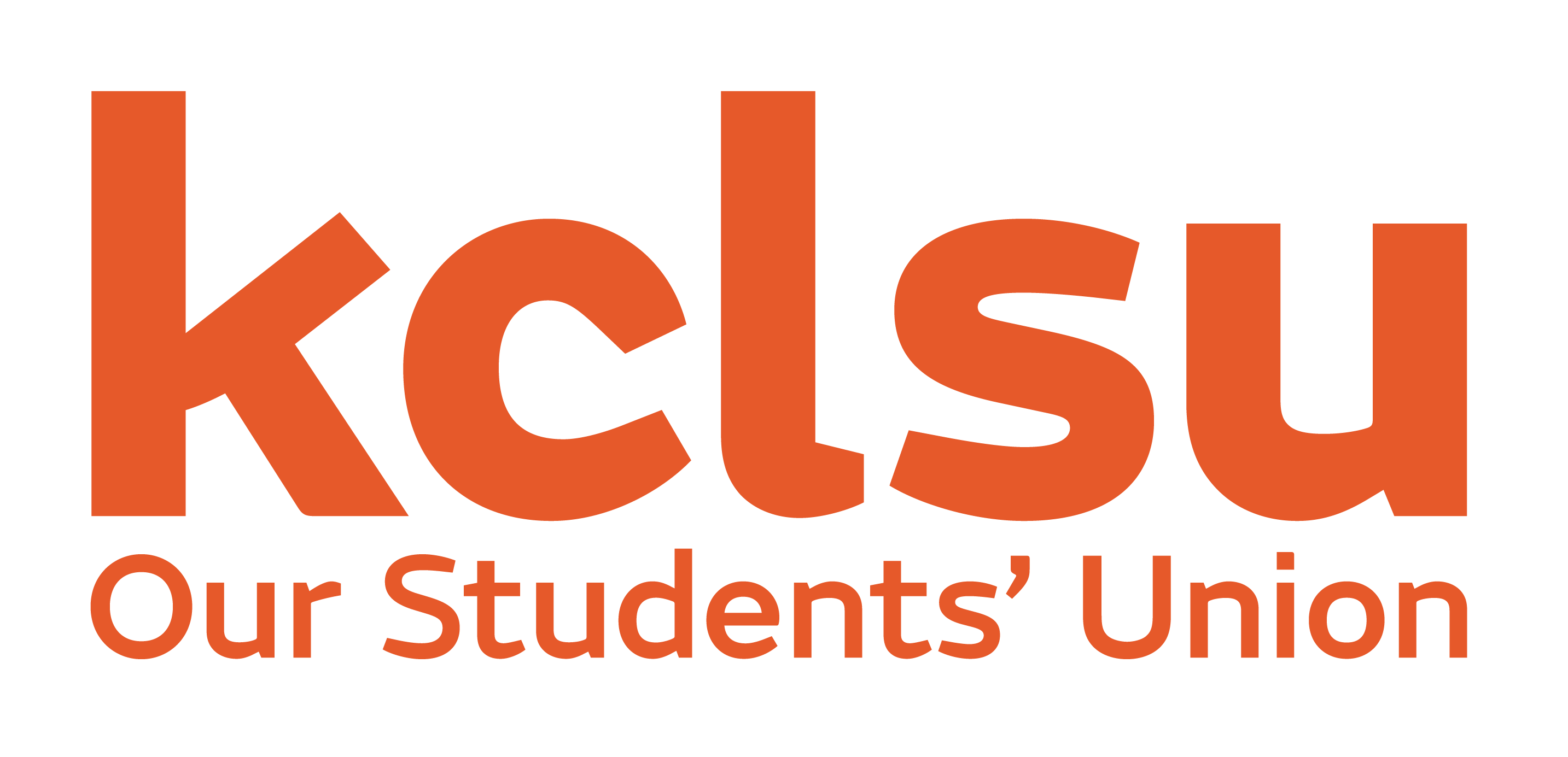
Logo of the King's College London Students' Union (KCLSU)

King's College, London Union Society was founded in 1873. In 1905, this was reorganised, providing common rooms, student clubs and entertainment, with a further reorganisation in 1908 seeing it take over the athletics club (established in 1884) and other social activities, and becoming a students' union.

As King's College London Students' Union (KCLSU), it now provides a wide range of activities and services, including more than 50 intramural sports clubs, more than 300 activity groups, and bars and cafes (the Shack and the Vault in Bush House on the Strand Campus, and Guy's Café and Guy's Bar on Guy's Campus).

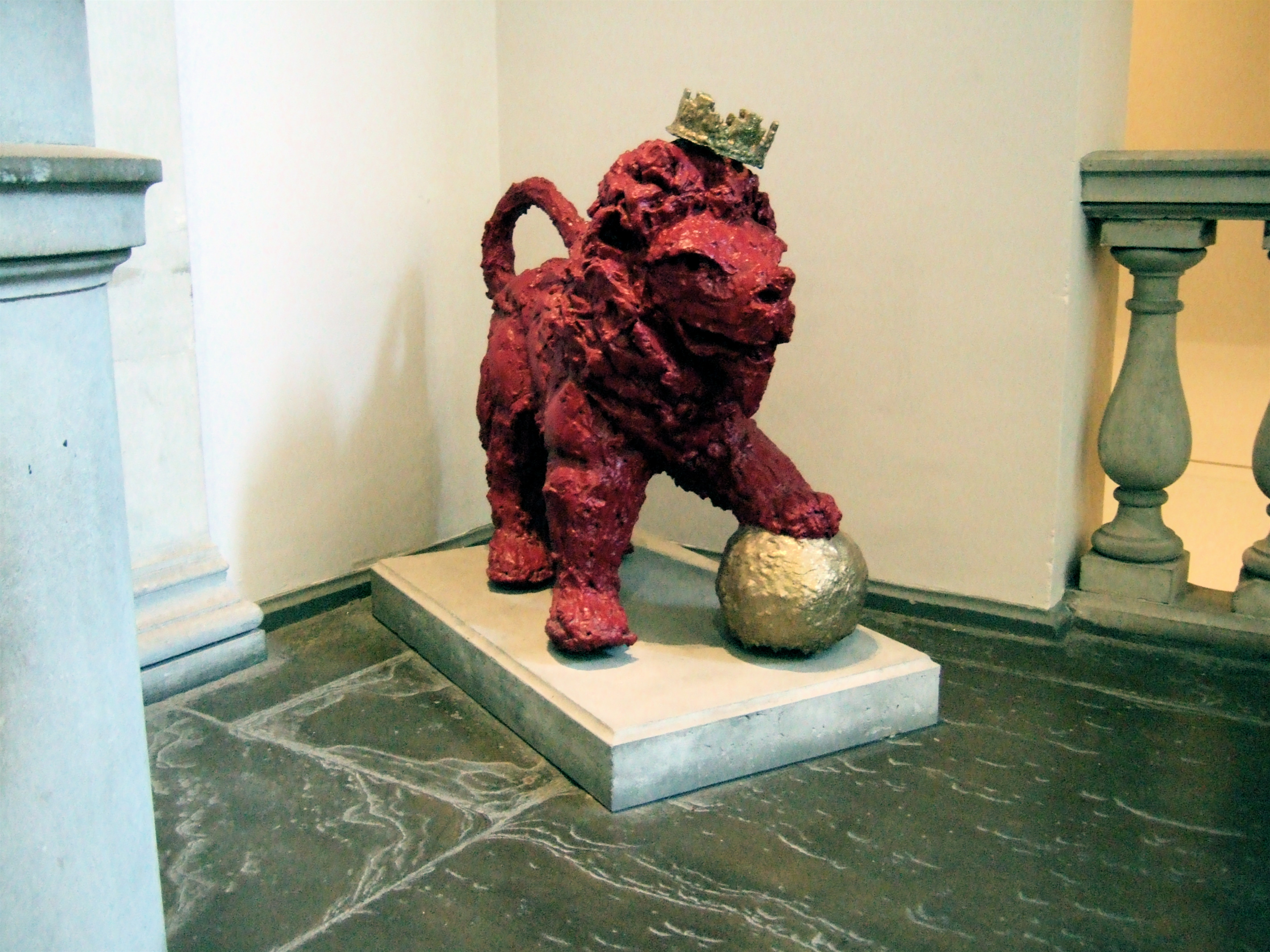
A papier-mâché version of Reggie the Lion, the mascot of KCLSU, outside the Great Hall in King's Strand Campus

Reggie the Lion is the official mascot of the students' union. In total there are four Reggies in existence. The original can be found on display in the undercroft of the Union's Bush House base at the Strand Campus. A papier-mâché Reggie lives outside the Great Hall at the Strand Campus. The third Reggie, given as a gift by alumnus Willie Kwan, guards the entrance of Willies Common Room in Somerset House East Wing. A small sterling silver incarnation is displayed during graduation ceremonies, which was presented to King's by former Halliburton Professor of Physiology, Robert John Stewart McDowall, in 1959.

=== Student media ===
KCLSU Student Media won Student Media of the Year 2014 at the Ents Forum awards and came in the top three student media outlets in the country at the NUS Awards 2014.

Roar News is a tabloid newspaper for students at King's which is owned and funded by KCLSU. It is editorially independent of both the university and the students' union and its award-winning website is read by tens of thousands of people per month in over 100 countries. In 2014 it had a successful awards season, scooping several national awards and commendations, including a Mind Media Award and Student Media of the Year.

The radio station of KCLSU, KCL Radio, was founded in 2009 as a podcast producer. The first live broadcast of KCL Radio was in 2011 at the London Varsity. In 2013, KCL Radio relaunched as a live station with more than 45 hours of live programming per week. The schedule of the radio station includes news, music, entertainment, debate, sport and live performance.

Other King's student media groups include the King's College London Film Society, student television station KingsTV, and the photographic society KCLSU PhotoSoc.

=== Sports ===
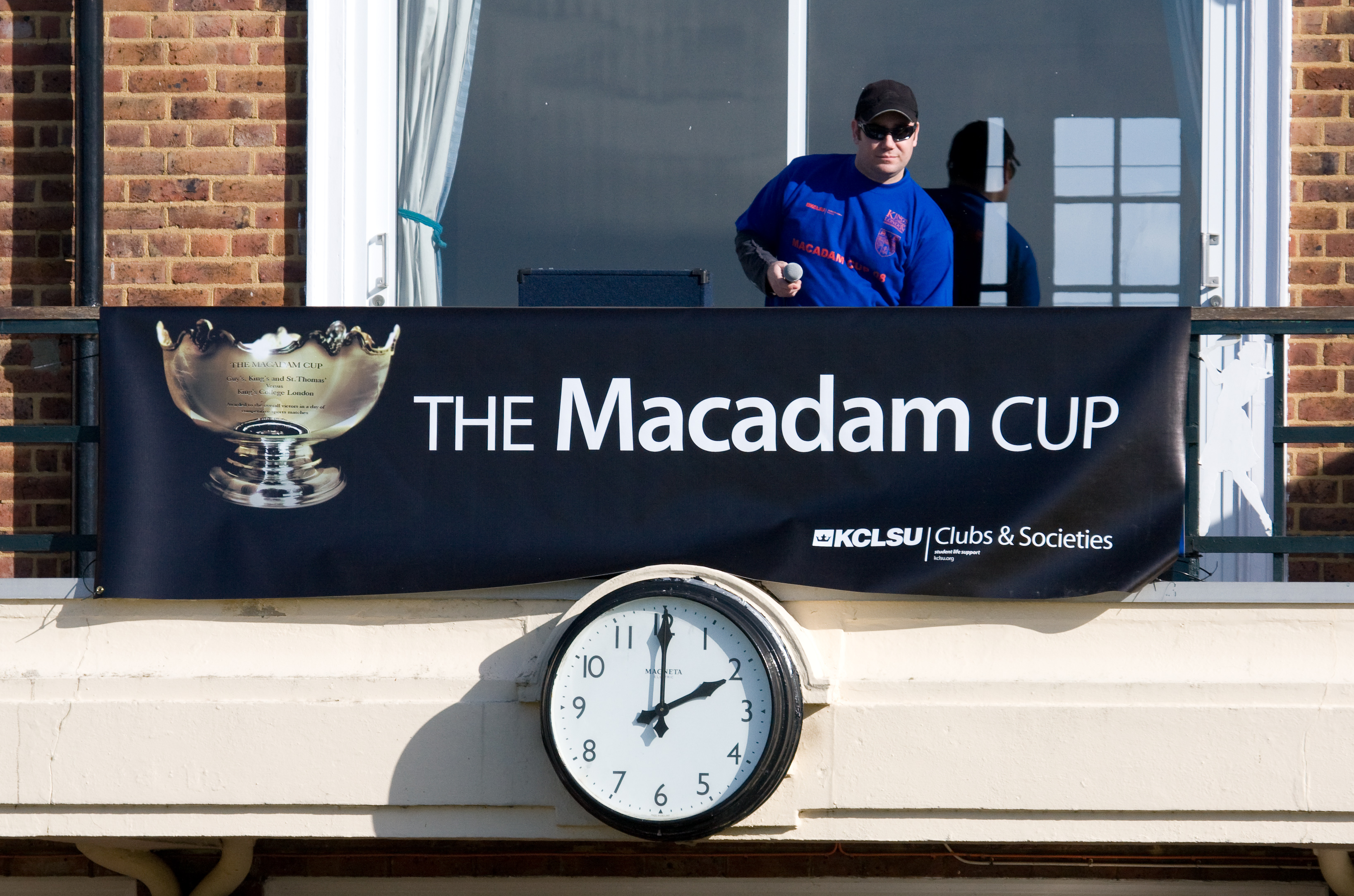
The annual Macadam Cup

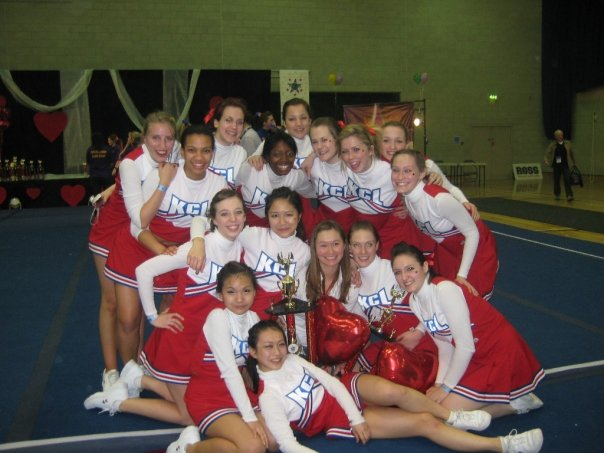
King's College London cheerleaders

There are over 60 sports clubs, many of which compete in the University of London and British Universities & Colleges (BUCS) leagues across the South East. The annual Macadam Cup, named after Sir Ivison Macadam, a KCL alumnus and first president of the National Union of Students, is a varsity match that has been played between the sports teams of King's College London proper and the Guy's, King's and St. Thomas' School of Medicine since 2005.

King's Sport, a partnership between King's College London and KCLSU, manages all the sports activities and facilities of King's since 2013. King's Sport runs three fitness centres at the Waterloo, Guy's and Strand Campuses which include various studio spaces. King's Sport also operates two sports grounds, in New Malden and Honor Oak. Honor Oak Park Sports Ground has a floodlit 3G field hockey pitch and a floodlit 2G football/multi-sport pitch, as well as a grass football pitch, a grass rugby pitch and a netball or tennis court. New Malden Sports Ground has four football pitches, two rugby pitches, a lacrosse pitch, and two all-weather netball or tennis courts, with a cricket ground being set up in the summer. There are also on-campus sports facilities at Guy's, St Thomas's and Denmark Hill campuses. King's students and staff can utilize Guy's and St Thomas' NHS Foundation Trust's fitness centre and swimming pool based within the Guy's and St Thomas' hospitals.

=== Societies and organisations ===
In addition to sporting clubs, King's College London Students' Union also has around 300 other societies and groups in a wide variety of activities.

=== Student-led think tank ===
Following the 2010 student demonstrations against increased tuition fees, King's College London students founded London's first student-led think tank, King's Think Tank (formerly known as KCL Think Tank). With a membership of more than 2000, it is the largest organisation of its kind in Europe. This student initiative organises lectures and discussions in seven different policy areas, and assists students in lobbying politicians, non-governmental organisations (NGOs) and other policymakers with their ideas. Every May, it produces a peer-reviewed journal of policy recommendations named The Spectrum.

=== Music ===
There are many music societies at King's including a cappella groups, orchestras, choir, musical theatre and jazz society. King's has three orchestras: King's College London Symphony Orchestra (KCLSO), King's College London Chamber Orchestra and KCL Concert Orchestra.

Founded in 1945, the Choir of King's College London consists of around 30 choral scholars. The choir regularly broadcasts on BBC Radio 3 and Radio 4, and has made recordings – mainly focusing on 16th-century English and Spanish repertoire.

All the King's Men is an all-male a cappella ensemble from King's College London. Founded in 2009, it become the first group outside of Oxford and Cambridge to win The Voice Festival UK in 2012.

American rock band Foo Fighters played their first UK gig at King's College London Students Union in 1995. Pop singer Taylor Swift played her first UK gig at the Strand Campus in 2008.

=== Rivalry with University College London ===
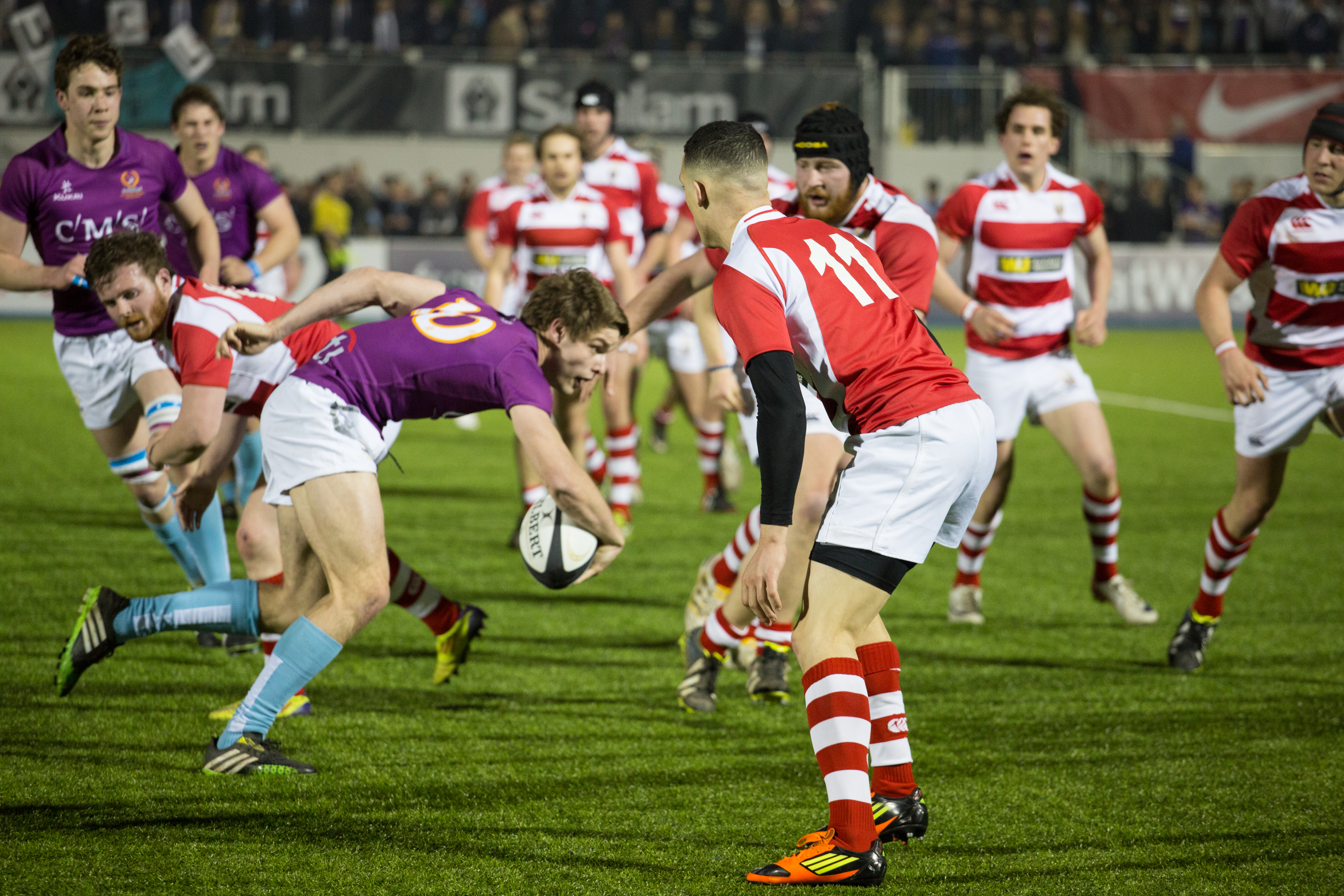
King's traditional rivalry with UCL is nowadays most noted at the yearly varsity rugby match

Competition within the University of London is most intense between King's and University College London, the two oldest institutions. Indeed, the University of London when it was established has been described as "an umbrella organisation designed to disguise the rivalry between UCL and KCL." In the early twentieth century, King's College London and UCL rivalry was centred on their respective mascots. University College's was Phineas Maclino, a wooden tobacconist's emblem of a kilted Jacobite Highlander purloined from outside a shop in Tottenham Court Road during the celebrations of the relief of Ladysmith in 1900. King's later addition was a giant beer bottle representing "bottled youth". In 1923 it was replaced by a new mascot to rival Phineas – Reggie the Lion, who made his debut at a King's–UCL sporting rag in December 1923, protected by a lifeguard of engineering students armed with T-squares. Thereafter, Reggie formed the centrepiece of annual freshers' processions by King's students around Aldwych in which new students were typically flour bombed.

Although riots between respective college students occurred in central London well into the 1950s, rivalry is now limited to the rugby union pitch and skulduggery over mascots, with the annual London Varsity series culminating in the historic match between King's College London RFC and University College London RFC.

=== Rivalry with the London School of Economics ===
On 2 December 2005, tensions between King's and the London School of Economics (LSE) were ignited when at least 200 students from LSE (located in Aldwych near the Strand Campus) diverted off from the annual "barrel run" and caused an estimated £32,000 of damage to the English department at King's. King's principal, Sir Rick Trainor, deplored the behaviour and called for no retaliation. The LSE Students' Union on 6 December issued a formal apology and promised to pay for the damage repair.

=== Student residences ===
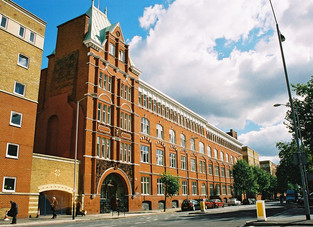
The Great Dover Street halls of residence

King's has 14 halls of residence in central London. The university guarantees accommodation for new first-year undergraduate or foundation year students who make a firm acceptance of their offer and apply for accommodation by a defined date, and to postgraduates who make a firm acceptance of their offer and apply for accommodation by a different defined date. Accommodation is also guaranteed for care-experienced students, and students who are under 18 on move-in day. The university also has a scheme, King's Affordable Accommodation Scheme (KAAS) which enables undergraduate students to access accommodation priced at below market levels, provided applicants for the scheme meet the eligibility criteria. There is a limited quota for KAAS rooms in a number of King's residences.

There are also five intercollegiate halls shared with the constituent colleges of the University of London, which full-time students at King's are eligible to live in.

The university's Champion Hill residence has been empty since 2020, following the discovery of fire safety concerns and subsequent relocation of students and staff. A university spokesperson stated in March 2024, "We are working to refurbish these buildings with the aim to have them available as student accommodation as soon as work is completed, and it is safe to do so."

King's newest residence opened in Battersea, in September 2024, and contains 452 rooms. A number of affordable rooms have been secured under the KAAS scheme.

== Notable people ==
=== Notable alumni ===
There are 14 Nobel laureates who were associated with either King's College London or one of the institutions that have since merged with it. Notable alumni in the sciences include Nobel laureates Peter Higgs (Physics), Sir Michael Houghton (Medicine) and Michael Levitt (Chemistry). Others include Sir Francis Galton, polymath and pioneer of eugenics and the IVF pioneer, Patrick Steptoe. Alumni in performing arts include impressionist Rory Bremner; Queen bassist John Deacon; and Oscar winners Greer Garson, Edmund Gwenn and Anne Dudley. In law, alumni include Karim Ahmad Khan, Chief Prosecutor of the International Criminal Court, and Patrick Lipton Robinson, a judge of the International Court of Justice. In literature, alumni include the dramatist Sir W. S. Gilbert of Gilbert and Sullivan, and the writers Thomas Hardy, Sir Arthur C. Clarke and Virginia Woolf.

Notable King's alumni to have held senior positions in British politics include two Speakers of the House of Commons (Horace King and James Lowther), and one Foreign Secretary (David Owen). King's has also educated numerous foreign heads of state and government including two presidents of Cyprus, Tassos Papadopoulos and Glafcos Clerides; Marouf al-Bakhit, Prime Minister of Jordan; France-Albert René, President of the Seychelles; Sir Lynden Pindling, Prime Minister of the Bahamas; Godfrey Binaisa, President of Uganda; Abdul-Rahman al-Bazzaz, Prime Minister of Iraq; Maurice Bishop, Prime Minister of Grenada; and Sir Lee Moore, Prime Minister of Saint Kitts and Nevis.

King's alumni in religion include Desmond Tutu, Nobel Peace Prize laureate and Archbishop of Cape Town; George Carey, Archbishop of Canterbury; and Jonathan Sacks, Chief Rabbi of the United Kingdom and the Commonwealth. While in the military, alumni include Sir Tony Radakin, Chief of the Defence Staff; Lord Harding, Chief of the Imperial General Staff; two Chiefs of the Air Staff, Sir Stephen Hillier and Sir Michael Wigston; and two recipients of the Victoria Cross, Ferdinand Le Quesne and Mark Sever Bell. King's is also the alma mater of the founder of Bentley Motors, Walter Bentley; oil magnate and philanthropist Calouste Gulbenkian, and Olympic gold medalists Dame Katherine Grainger, Paul Bennett and Kieran West.

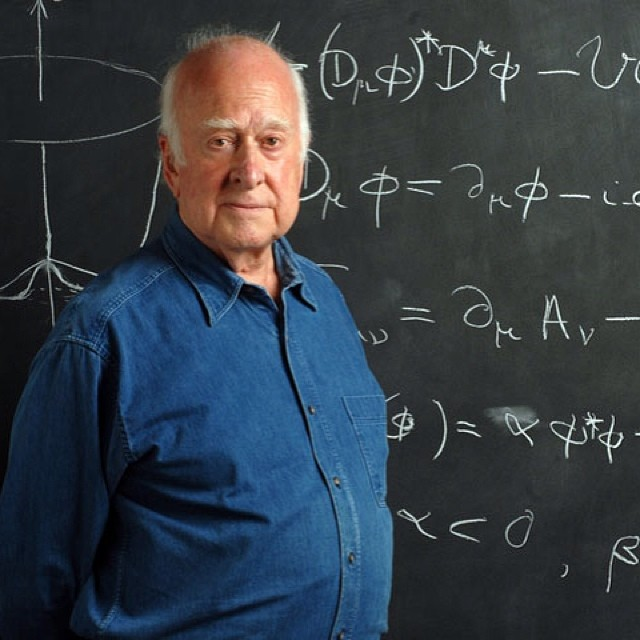
Physicist Peter Higgs, awarded the 2013 Nobel Prize in Physics for his work on the Higgs boson

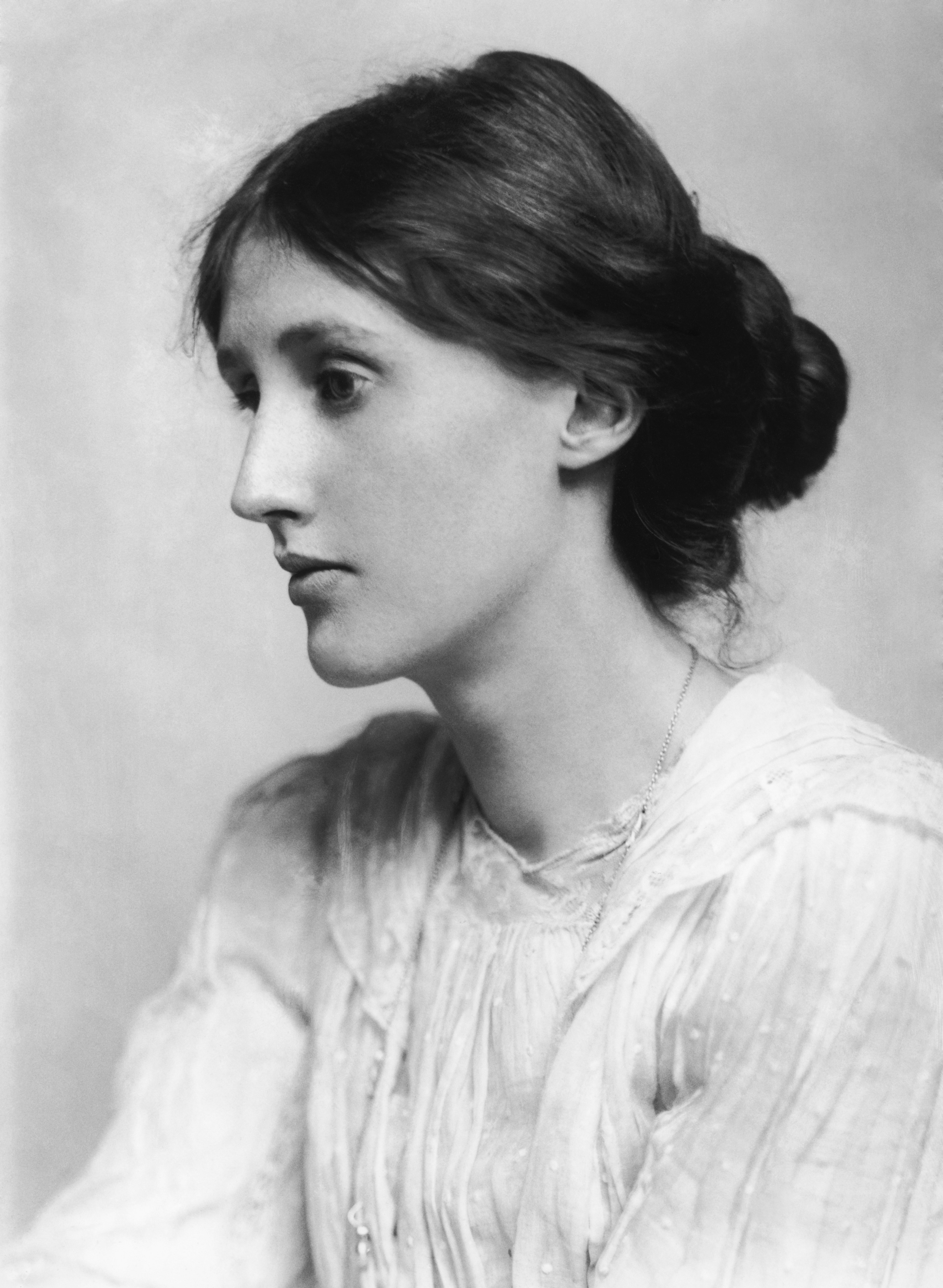
Writer Virginia Woolf

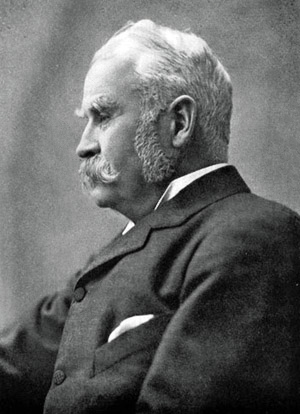
Dramatist Sir W. S. Gilbert of Gilbert and Sullivan

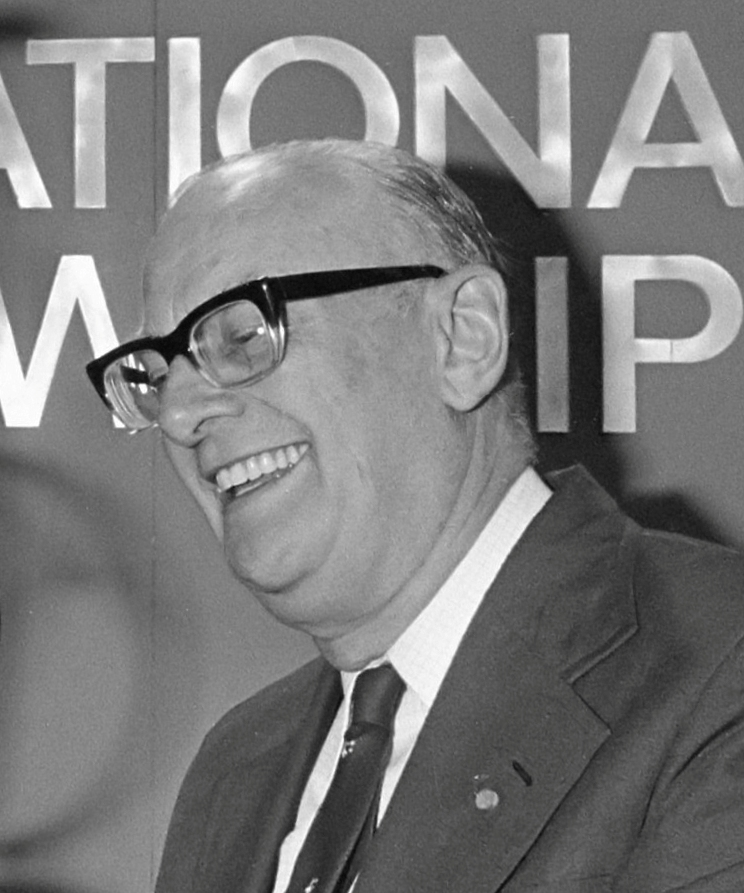
Science fiction writer Sir Arthur C. Clarke

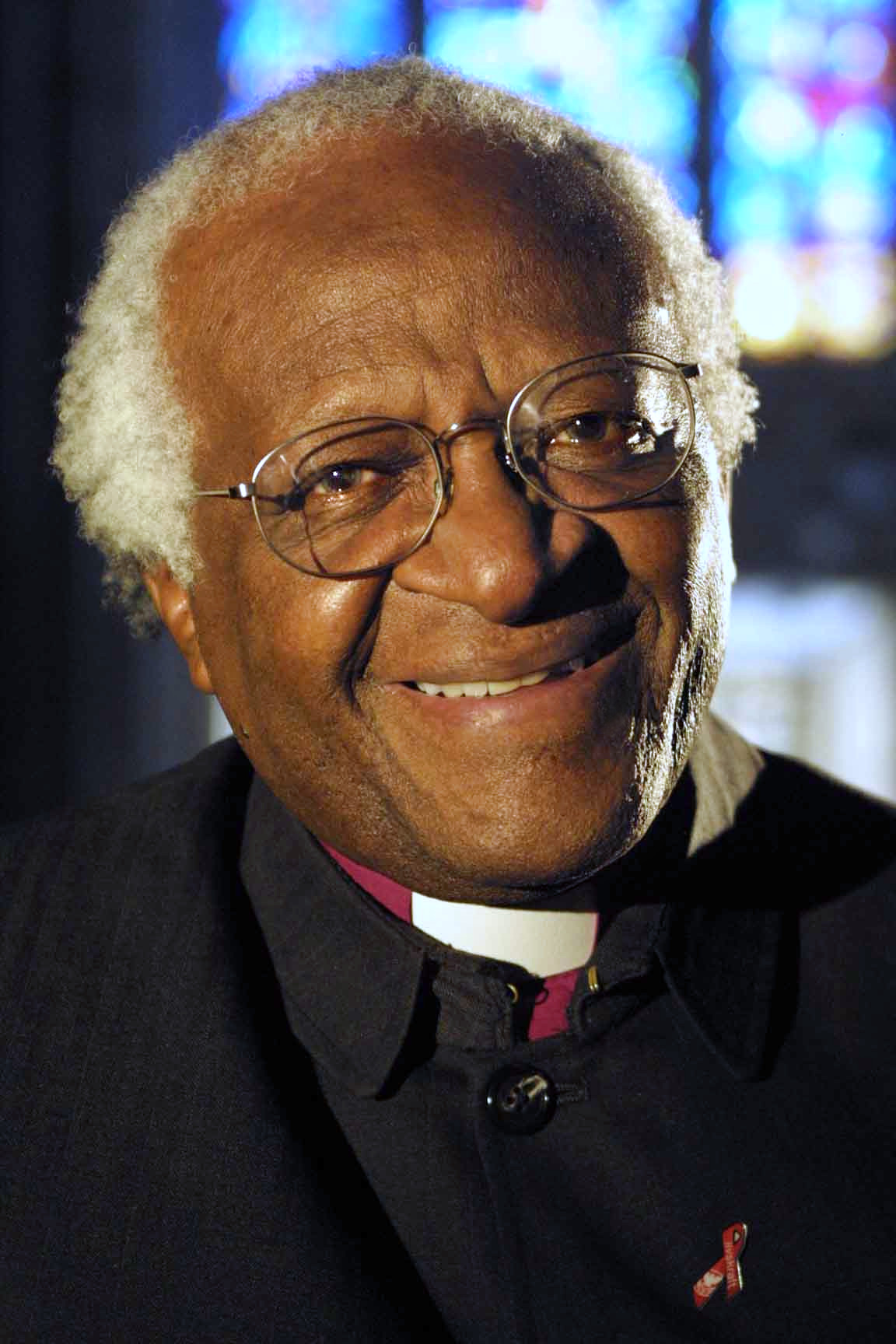
Archbishop Desmond Tutu, awarded the Nobel Peace Prize in 1984

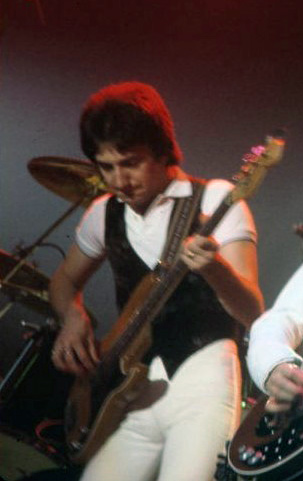
Queen bassist John Deacon

=== Notable academics and staff ===
Notable academics at King's have included Sir Charles Lyell (geologist and author of Principles of Geology), Sir Charles Wheatstone (best known for the Wheatstone bridge), James Clerk Maxwell (mathematical physicist known for Maxwell's equations describing the motion of light as an electro-magnetic wave), Joseph Lister (pioneer of antiseptic surgery), Charles Barkla (winner of the 1917 Nobel Prize in Physics), Sir Owen Richardson (winner of the 1928 Nobel Prize in Physics), Sir Edward Appleton (winner of the 1947 Nobel Prize in Physics), Maurice Wilkins and Rosalind Franklin (both known for their contributions to the discovery of the structure of DNA, for which Wilkins won the 1962 Nobel Prize for Medicine after Franklin's death), Mario Vargas Llosa (writer and winner of the 2010 Nobel Prize for Literature), and Sir Roger Penrose (winner of the 2020 Nobel Prize in Physics).

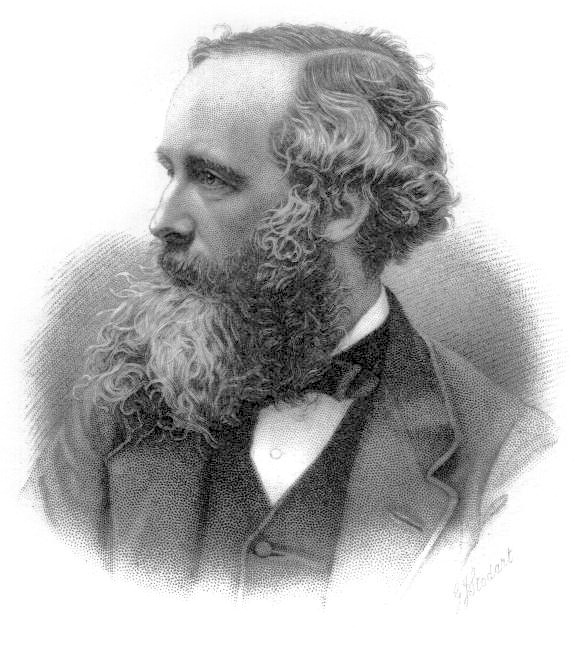
James Clerk Maxwell

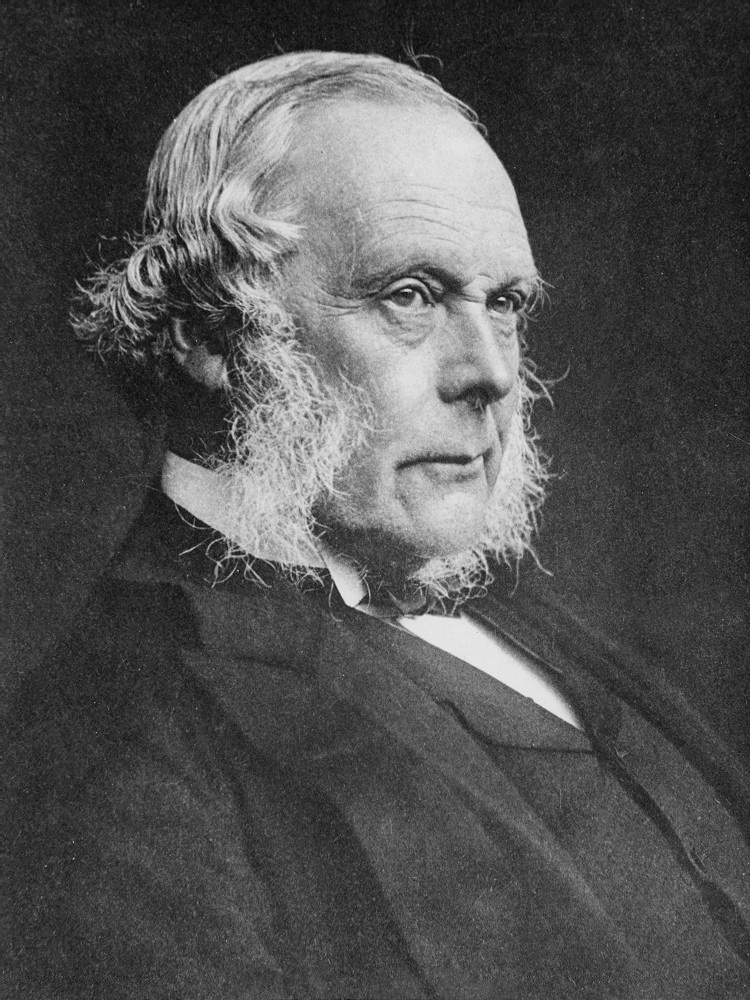
Joseph Lister

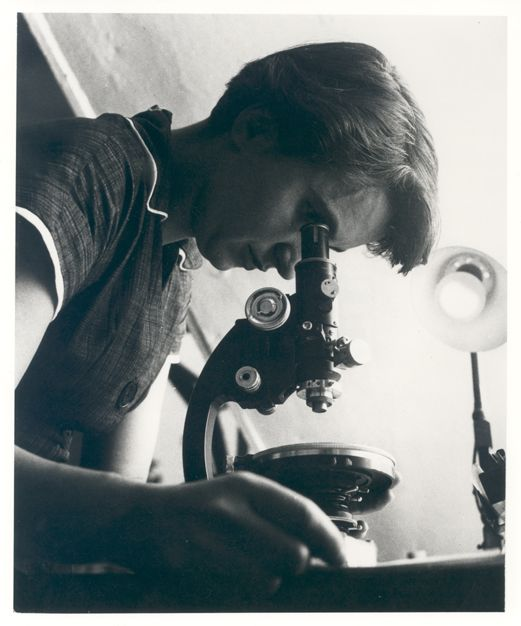
Rosalind Franklin

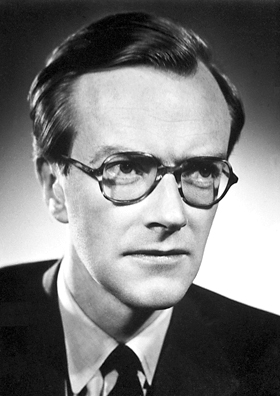
Maurice Wilkins

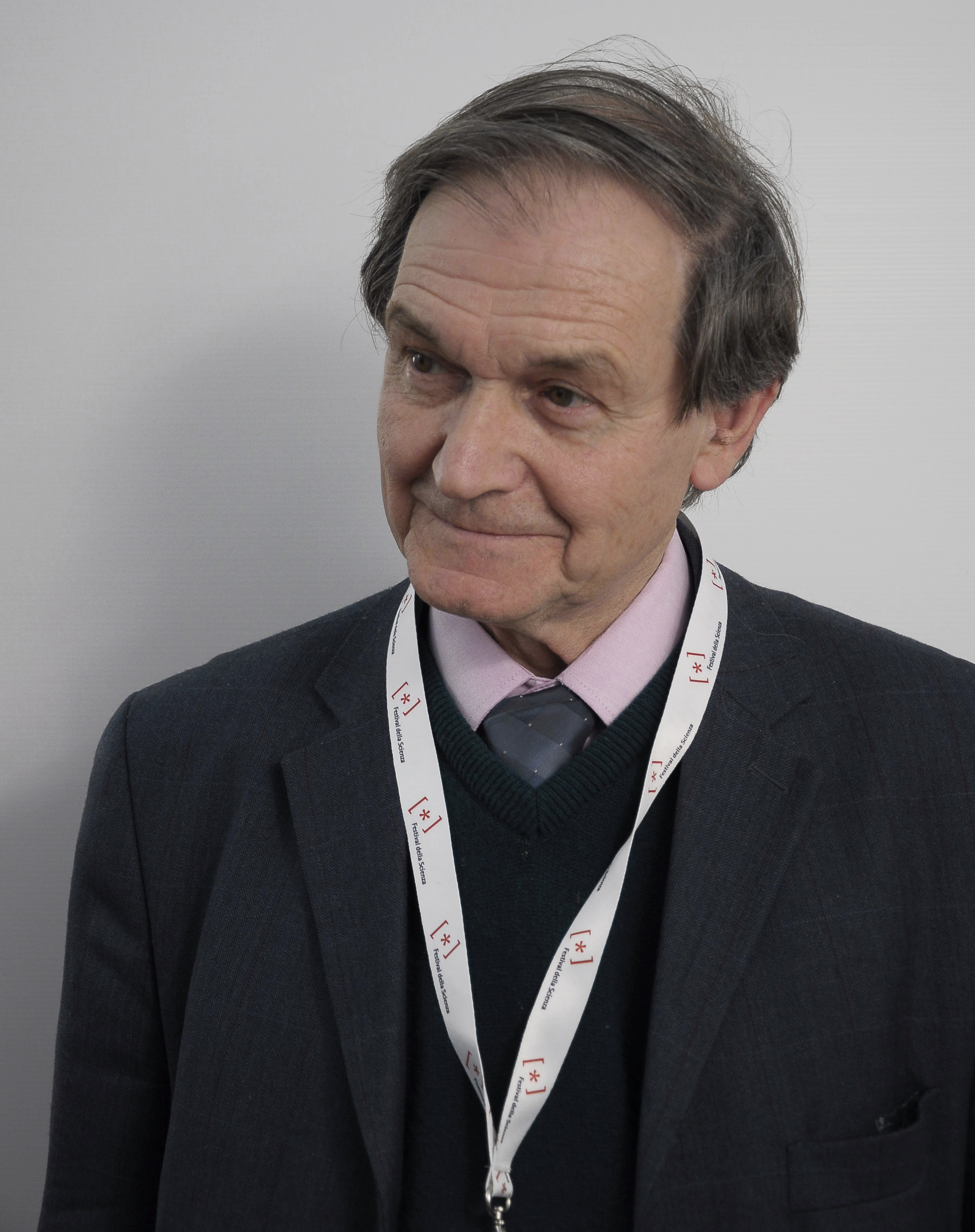
Roger Penrose

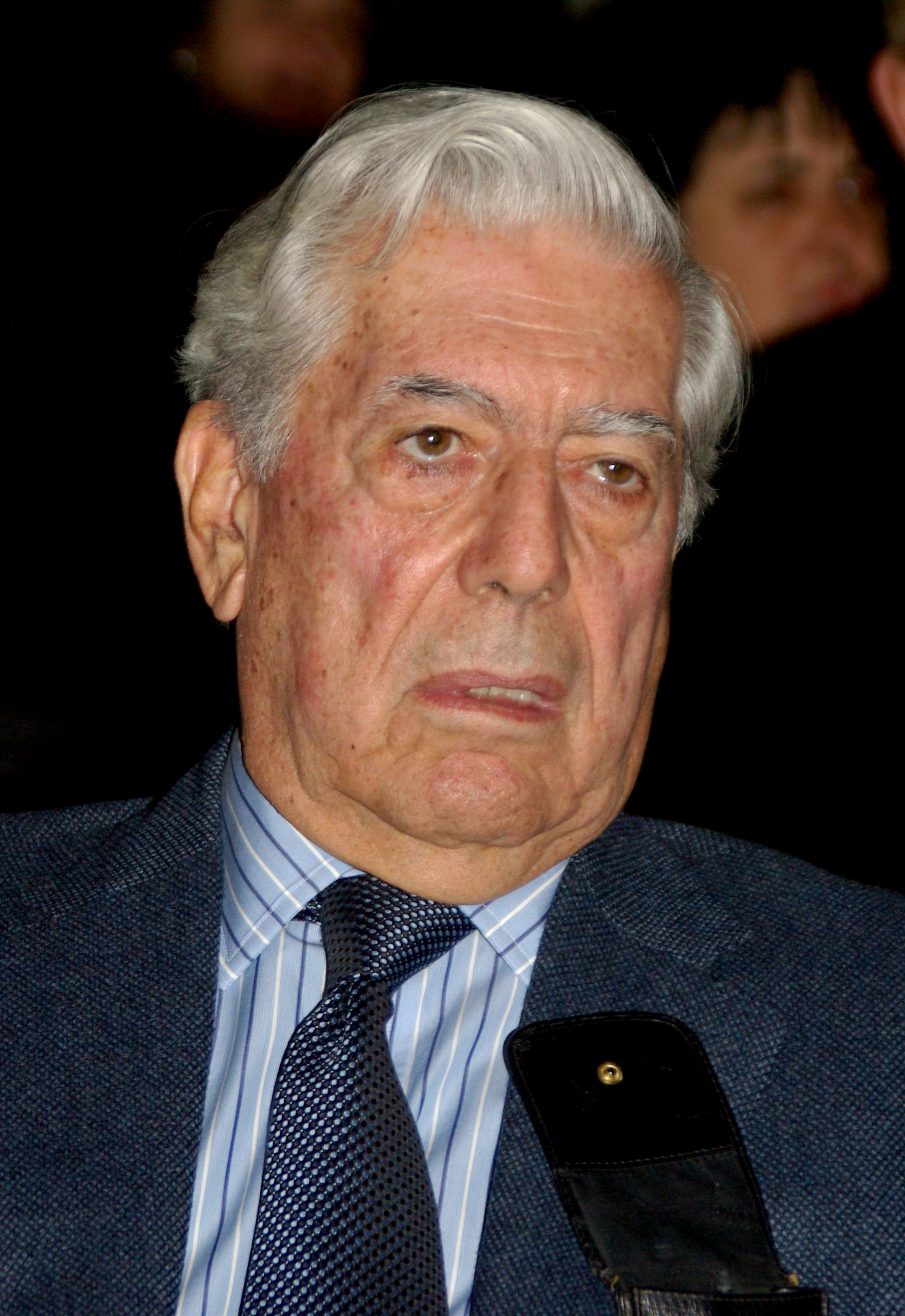
Mario Vargas Llosa

== In popular culture ==
=== Film and television settings ===
The neoclassical facade of King's, with the passage which connects the Strand to the Somerset House terrace, has been utilised to reproduce the late Victorian Strand in the opening scenes of Oliver Parker's 2002 film The Importance of Being Earnest. The East Wing of King's appears, as a part of Somerset House, in a number of other productions, such as Wilde and The Duchess.

The Maughan Library has also been the location of some film shoots of popular movies and TV series, most notably Johnny English, The Imitation Game and V for Vendetta. A scene from the popular Netflix movie Enola Holmes was also filmed at the library's gate.

Part of Dan Brown's novel The Da Vinci Code is set in the Round Reading Room of the Maughan Library, although no part of the film adaption was filmed there.

In September 1979, The Greenwood Theatre at Guy's Medical School (now King's GKT Medical School) became the first home for the BBC's Question Time programme. In December 2018, Question Time returned to the Greenwood Theatre for David Dimbleby's last programme as host.

== See also ==
- Armorial of UK universities
- List of universities in the UK
