= Oldest football clubs =

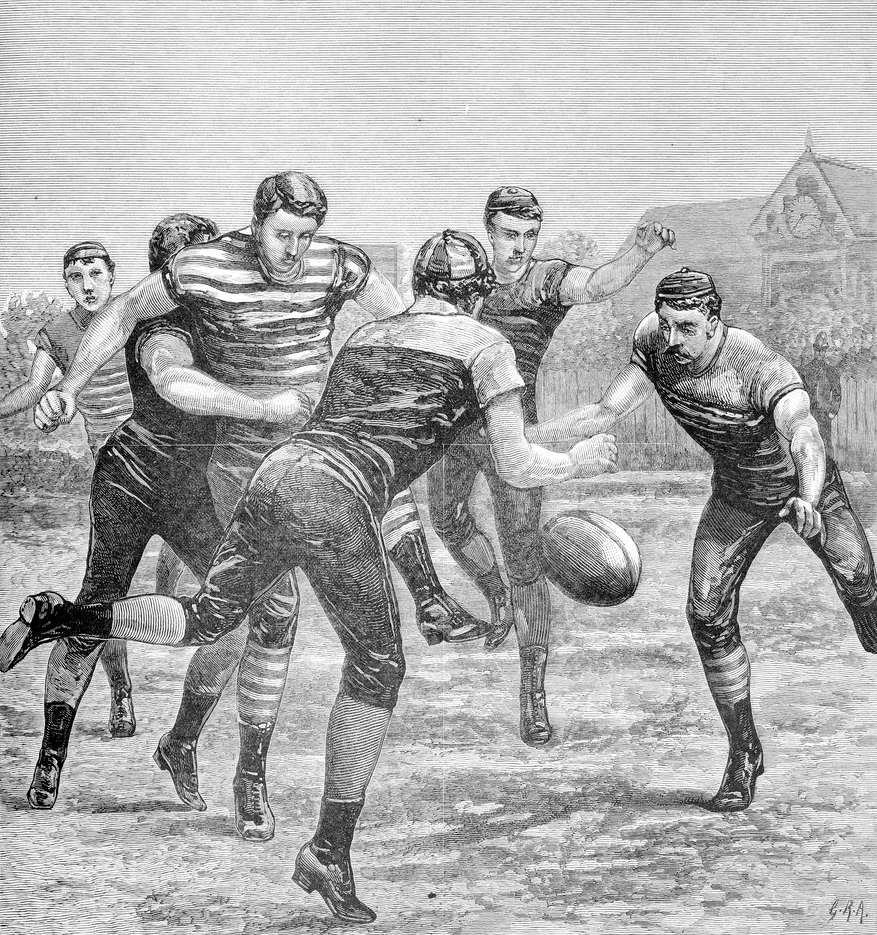
An 1881 Australian rules football match between Melbourne and Geelong. The clubs were founded in 1858 and 1859, respectively, and currently compete in the Australian Football League (AFL), making them the world's oldest football clubs that are now professional.

The oldest football clubs trace their origins to the mid-19th century, a period when football evolved from being a casual pastime to an organised mainstream sport.

The identity of the oldest football clubs in the world, or even in a particular country, is often disputed or claimed by several clubs, across several codes of football. The Gymnastic Society in London, founded in the 18th century, is the earliest recorded society dedicated to football. The Foot-Ball Club of Edinburgh is thought to be the earliest recorded club with football in its name in the world, with records going back to 1824. Rugby clubs also referred to themselves, or continue to refer to themselves, as simply a "football club", or as a "rugby football club". "Club" has always meant an independent entity and, during the historical period in question, very few high school or university teams were independent of the educational institutions concerned. Consequently, school and university football teams were seldom referred to as "clubs". That has always been the case, for example, in American football, which has always had ties to college sport in general. Conversely, however, the oldest still-existing "football club" with a well-documented, continuous history is Dublin University Football Club, a rugby union club founded in 1854 at Trinity College, Dublin, Ireland. There exists some record of Guy's Hospital Football Club being founded in London in 1843, through an 1883 fixture card referring to Guy's 40th season.

The world's oldest extant professional football club of any code of football is the Melbourne Football Club, founded in 1858 as a rugby club. Melbourne in 1859 adopted new rules for Australian Rules Football (Aussie Rules) and today plays in the Australian Football League (AFL), being premiers as recently as 2021 after defeating the Western Bulldogs in the 2021 AFL Grand Final.

== Britain and Ireland ==
=== Defunct clubs ===
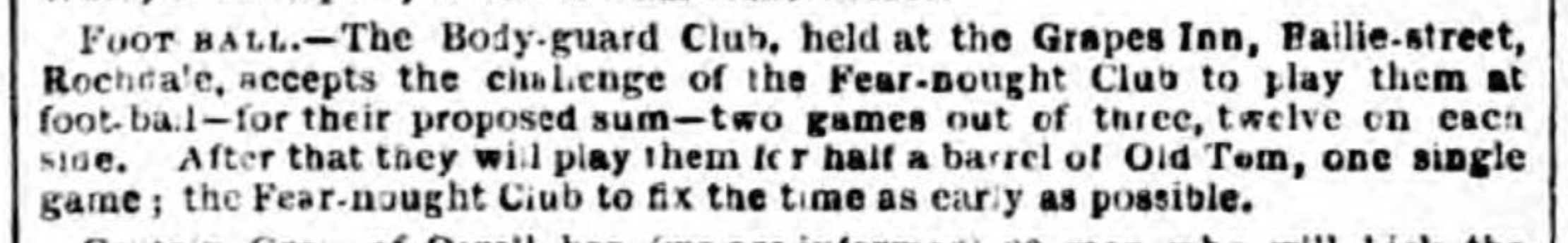
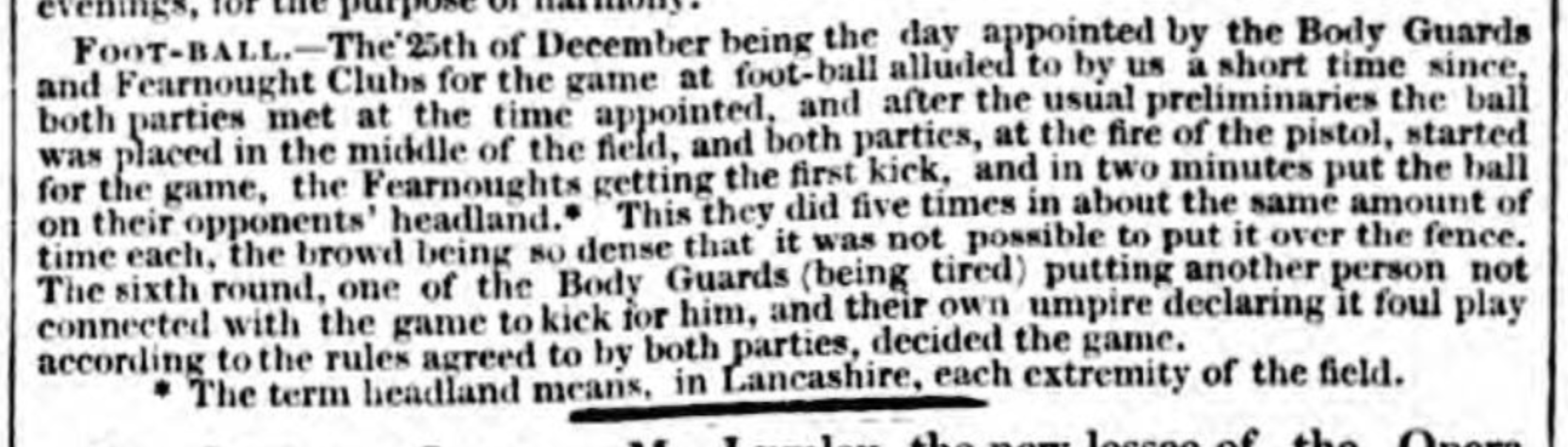
Newspaper articles describing the game between the Body-guard Club and the Fear-nought Club, held on Christmas Day 1841

While the first clubs emerged in Britain, possibly as early as the fifteenth century, these are poorly-documented and defunct. For example, the records of the Brewers' Company of London between 1421 and 1423 mention the hiring out of their hall by the "football players" for "20 pence", under the heading "Trades and Fraternities". The listing of football players as a "fraternity" or a group of players meeting socially under this identity is the earliest allusion to what might be considered a football club. Other early sporting bodies dedicated to playing football include "The Gymnastic Society" of London which met regularly during the second half of the eighteenth century to pursue two sports: football and wrestling. The club played its matches – for example between London-based natives of Cumberland and Westmorland – at the Kennington Common from well before 1789 until about 1800.

The Foot-Ball Club (active 1824–41) of Edinburgh, Scotland, is the first documented club dedicated to football, and the first to describe itself as a football club. The only surviving club rules forbade tripping, but allowed pushing and holding and the picking up of the ball. Other documents describe a game involving 39 players and "such kicking of shins and such tumbling".

Other early clubs include the Great Leicestershire Cricket and Football Club present in 1840.

On Christmas Day 1841, an early documented match between two self-described "football clubs" took place. The Body-guard Club (of Rochdale) lost to the Fear-nought Club after using an ineligible player as a substitute. The complete rules used in this game are unknown, but they specified twelve players on each side, with each team providing its own umpire, and the game being started by the firing of a pistol.

A club for playing "cricket, quoits and football" was established in Newcastle upon Tyne in or before 1848. The Surrey Football Club was established in 1849 and published the first non-school football list of rules (which were probably based upon the eighteenth century Gymnastic Society cited above). Windsor Home Park F.C. was in existence as early as 1854, and would go on to compete in early editions of the FA Cup.

=== Continuous clubs ===
Supported by the Guinness Book of Records, and founded by staff at Guy's Hospital in London in 1843, the Guy's, King's and St Thomas' RFC would be the oldest "football" club of any code. Nevertheless, the connection between the present club and the original "Guy's Hospital" formed in 1843 is still disputed, alleging that the present club is a modern amalgam of three formerly distinct hospital rugby clubs, starting with the Guy's Hospital and St Thomas' Hospital teams, which were the first to merge following the union of their respective Medical Departments. The last department to merge was the King's College Hospital in 1999, although its club (founded in 1869) remained as a separate institution.

In Northern Ireland, the oldest football club is North of Ireland F.C., formed in 1868. It was the first rugby club formed in what is now Northern Ireland and only two other clubs - Dublin University and Wanderers - were formed earlier anywhere else in all Ireland.

It has been claimed that the present-day Barnes Rugby Football Club, from Barnes in London, is a continuation of the nineteenth-century Barnes Football Club, and moreover that the latter club was formed in 1839 and is thus the oldest club to have played football for its entire history. However, as of 2018, Barnes RFC's website claims only that the club was established in the 1920s, while alluding to "possibilities" that its history stretches back to 1862. In 2021, local enthusiasts revived the old Barnes Football Club, established in 1862.

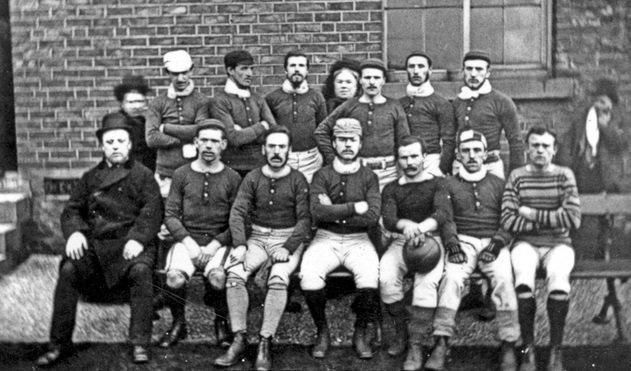
Sheffield F.C. (similar Sheffield representative side here pictured in 1875) is the oldest independent (that is, not related with a school or university) association football club in the world

Sheffield F.C. in England, is the world's oldest surviving independent open football club: that is, the oldest club not associated with an institution such as a school, hospital or university; and which was open to all to play. It was founded in 1857. Sheffield F.C. initially played Sheffield rules, a code of its own devising, although the club's rules influenced those of the England Football Association (FA) (1863) including handball, free kicks, corners and throw ins. While the international governing body of association football FIFA and the FA recognise Sheffield F.C. as the "world's oldest football club", and the club joined the FA in 1863, it continued to use the Sheffield rules. Sheffield F.C. did not officially adopt association football until 1877.

Notts County F.C. are officially the oldest professional football club in the world, formed in 1862, playing their first recorded match on 8 December 1864 at Nottingham's Meadows Cricket Ground against a team known as Trent Valley. Notts are thought to have mostly played under Sheffield Rules in their early days, though certain matches are recorded as being played according to "Nottingham Rules". A team from the same city, Nottingham Forest F.C. (initially a group of shinty players) are recognised as the second oldest professional football club in the world, having been formed in 1865.

Setting its birth date in 1856, Cambridge University A.F.C. has been described by the university as the oldest club now playing association football. For example, "Salopians formed a club of their own in the late 1830s/early 1840s but that was presumably absorbed by the Cambridge University Football Club that they were so influential in creating in 1846". According to Charles Astor Bristed, in the early 1840s at Cambridge, there were games played between clubs from colleges and houses. Football is documented as being played on the original club ground, Parker's Piece, as early as 1838. The earliest existing evidence of the Cambridge University Football Club comes from "The Laws of the University Football Club" dated 1856, and held at Shrewsbury School. The Cambridge rules of 1863 would provide the basis for the FA's original rules.

The only survivor among the FA's founding clubs still playing association football is Civil Service F.C. Six of the 18 founding members later adopted rugby exclusively. Cray Wanderers F.C., originally of St Mary Cray and currently playing in nearby Chislehurst, founded in 1860, is the oldest club now playing association football in Greater London. The code played by Cray Wanderers in its earliest years is unknown.

Liverpool Football Club (not to be confused with Liverpool F.C. of the Premier League), later known as Liverpool St Helens F.C., were formed in 1857, which claims to be the oldest open rugby club in the world. The club adopted the Rugby Union rules in 1872, never playing association rules.

==== Dublin University Team ====
The first known record of the club appears under the heading 'Trinity College' in the Dublin Daily Express of 1 December 1855 and is taken to show that it had then been in existence for at least a year:

FOOTBALL. - A match will be played in the College Park today (Saturday) between original and new members of the club. Play to commence at two o'clock College time.

The club had thus been founded by about 1854, and it has a well-documented, continuous history since then, which gives it a strong claim to be considered the world's oldest extant football club of any code. ('College time' was a practice at Trinity of having the clocks set 15 minutes behind local time to reduce lateness at lectures.)

== Rest of the world ==
=== Continental Europe ===
==== Albania ====
The first football club to be founded in Albania was the Vllaznia Sport Club on 16 February 1919.

==== Austria ====
The oldest still-active football club is the First Vienna Football Club founded on 22 August 1894. Their early rivals, the Vienna Cricket and Football-Club, was founded only one day later.

==== Belgium ====
Football Club Spa was founded by the Hunter-Blair family of Blairquhan, Ayrshire, Scotland, and was in operation in 1863. The fourth Baronet took his family there in order to economise. The oldest club still in existence today in Belgium is Royal Antwerp FC, founded in 1880.

==== Bosnia and Herzegovina ====
The oldest football club in Bosnia and Herzegovina is FK Sloboda founded in Novi Grad in 1910. The first club to be ever founded was Zrinjski Mostar in 1905, but it was inactive between 1945 and 1992.

==== Bulgaria ====
Botev Plovdiv is one of the oldest football club in Bulgaria founded in 1912.

==== Czech Republic ====
The oldest and second most successful Czech football club is Slavia Prague founded in 1892. The club still exists and plays in the Chance Liga, the top division of Czech football.

==== Croatia ====
The oldest still active football club in Croatia is NK Rijeka, formed in 1904 and playing association football at the latest in 1906, currently competing in the first Croatian league. HNK Segesta, that plays in the third division, was possibly founded in 1906, but its first recorded match was held in 1909.

==== Cyprus ====
Anorthosis Famagusta FC founded in 1911 is the oldest club with a football team, however it was a reading club and the football division of the club started in 1929, the same year Omonia Aradippou was founded. The now defunct football division of Enosis Neon Trust founded in 1924 is therefore the oldest football club, however the club closed its football division in 1938. The oldest surviving football club is therefore APOEL founded in 1926. The same year the now defunct Keravnos Strovolou FC was founded. The now defunct Pezoporikos Larnaca FC was founded in 1927 first merging to form EPA Larnaca FC in 1930. AEL Limassol and Aris Limassol both founded in 1930 and one year after the Anorthosis football division are therefore old clubs as well. Olympiakos Nicosia and Digenis Akritas Morphou FC were both subsequently founded in 1931.

==== Denmark ====
Kjøbenhavns Boldklub is the oldest football club in Denmark and the oldest active club in continental Europe. The sports club was formed in 1876 and association football was first played two years later.

==== Estonia ====
Estonian Sports Association Kalev (Estonian: Eesti Spordiselts Kalev) is a sports association in Estonia, founded in 1901.

In nowadays Estonia was the oldest formed club Tallinna Jalgpalliselts Meteor in 1908. It was defunct since 1911, but restored after First World War and Estonian War of Independence in 1926 under the name Tallinna SK Meteor which took action until 1937.

==== Finland ====
Helsingin Ponnistus is one of the oldest continuously active sports clubs and the oldest football club in Finland. It was founded in 1887. It started as a gymnastic club but got its football program in 1903.

==== France ====
The first football club in France was established in Paris in 1863 by English expatriates, as the following excerpt from a contemporary newspaper shows: "A number of English gentlemen living in Paris have lately organised a football club.... The football contests take place in the Bois de Boulogne, by permission of the authorities and surprise the French amazingly".

Le Havre AC was founded as an athletics and rugby club in 1872, making it the oldest surviving football club registered in France and continental Europe. They began playing association football on a regular basis in 1894. The English Taylors RFC, which was formed by British businessmen in Paris in 1877, was followed by Paris Football Club a year later. Racing Club de France was formed in 1882 and their rivals Stade Français in 1883. Technically AS Strasbourg could be considered the first French association football team, being established in 1890; they were however a German team at the time.

==== Georgia ====
FC Shevardeni-1906 Tbilisi was the first formal football club in Georgia, founded in 1906. Shevardeni started within the Sokol society after Czech sports figures helped introduce the game to the country. They played their first recorded match in October 1911. In May 2022, the club was involved in a match-fixing scandal, causing them to get expelled from the league. As a result, the club has ceased operations and has not played since.

The first documented, officially established and legally organized Georgian club was Komet FC, founded in 1907.

The oldest, still active Georgian club is FC Kolkheti-1913 Poti, founded in 1913. They currently play in the Erovnuli Liga 2, the second-highest tier of Georgian football.

==== Germany ====
The oldest surviving rugby football club is Heidelberger RK, which was founded on 9 May 1872 as a rowing and rugby club. The HRK has won 14 national titles 1927, 1928, 1971, 1973, 1976, 1986, 2010–2015, 2017 and 2018. The biggest success of the club was the qualification for the Rugby European Challenge Cup 2018/19 - only to be denied participation, because their main sponsor owns Stade Français. The second oldest still surviving rugby club is Hannover 1878 founded 1878 and winning 9 German championships. Both clubs still play in the 1. Bundesliga.

The first association football in Germany (and likely the first outside Great Britain) was Dresden English, founded on 18 March 1874. The club had over 70 members by then, primarily Englishmen working in Dresden, with its matches being attended by hundreds of spectators. Nevertheless, Dresden English was dissolved in 1898.

The oldest still active association football club is BFC Germania 1888 founded on 15 April 1888. They play in the 10th division as of 2020–21 season and never managed to win any national titles.

==== Greece ====
The oldest still active football club is Messiniakos F.C. founded in 1888. This club was founded in the city of Kalamata.

==== Hungary ====
The oldest still active football club in Hungary is Újpest Torna Egylet, founded in 1885. There are other old teams like Műegyetemi AFC founded in autumn 1897 as a proper football club and III. Kerületi TVE, which whose football section was founded officially in 1899 but stemmed from the 1897-founded Budai Football Csapat. The first ever football club to be founded in Hungary was Budapesti Torna Club having founded its football section in February 1897, dissolved in 1945–46.

==== Italy ====
In Italy, Genoa C.F.C. is the oldest active football club: it was founded by Charles De Grave Sells, S. Green, George Blake, W. Rilley, George Dormer Fawcus, H.M. Sandys, E. De Thierry, Johnathan Summerhill Sr., Johnathan Summerhill Jr. and Sir Charles Alfred Payton in Genoa on 7 September 1893. However, Genoa C.F.C. was not the first Italian football club, being Torino Football & Cricket Club (1887) but its history lasted only for 4 years. Founded by Edoardo Bosio (owner of Bosio & Caratsch, the earliest brewery in Italy), the team broke up in 1891. Older than Genoa and Torino is Associazione Sportiva Dilettantistica Fanfulla, a sports club founded in Lodi in 1873, but its football section was established thirty-five years later in 1908.

==== Latvia ====
Workers at the (British-owned) Salamandra metal factory in Riga founded the first football team in 1907: the British Football Club (later named Britannia).

==== Lithuania ====
The first inter-city football games are dating back to 1911. Shortly after gaining the independence in 1918, a Kybartai local of a German descent has purchased a ball, leveled out a football pitch, and gathered a team together. The team formed into a football club FK Sveikata in 1919. For the next three years the team was traveling to cities in East Prussia and Klaipėda Region to play games, as there were no other teams in Lithuania just yet. FK Sveikata is still a functioning club in Lithuania today.

==== Malta ====
The oldest football club in Malta is St.George's FC. Founded in 1890 in the city of Cospicua also known as Bormla.

==== Montenegro ====
The oldest football club in Montenegro is FK Lovćen founded in the town of Cetinje in 1913.

==== Netherlands ====
The oldest football (and oldest cricket) club in the Netherlands is Koninklijke UD from Deventer, founded in 1875 as a cricket club. In 1894, the club founded an association football section.

Koninklijke HFC was the first Dutch rugby club, established on 15 September 1879 by the 14-year-old Pim Mulier, who first encountered the sport in 1870. However, HFC switched to association football in 1883.

Utrechtse Sportvereniging Hercules (Utrecht Sports Association Hercules), also known as USV Hercules or Hercules Utrecht, is an amateur football club in Utrecht, established on 22 April 1882.

==== North Macedonia ====
The oldest football club in North Macedonia is FK Ljuboten, founded in 1919.

==== Norway ====
The first football team in Norway was probably started by a buekorps in Bergen, Nygaards Bataljon, in 1883. In 1885 the first Norwegian club however, Idrætsforeningen Odd, was founded in Skien. The footballing interest was very low, and was put on ice after a few months. However, the club Odd Grenland started up with football again in 1894, and are now Norway's oldest football club.

==== Poland ====
The oldest football club in Poland was either

- Lechia Lwów, established in 1903, or
- Czarni Lwów. This club is also believed to have been founded in 1903, but historical records are unclear as to the exact date of foundation.

When Lviv became a part of Ukraine (then part of the USSR) the clubs ceased to exist.

The oldest currently existing football club within Poland's current borders is widely considered to be Cracovia, but this is disputed by their Kraków arch-rivals Wisła Kraków; both clubs were founded in 1906, however there are multiple proofs that Wisła is younger. Resovia also lay claim to this distinction; the disputes centre around registration, continuity of a given team, and sources.

==== Portugal ====
In Portugal, FC Porto is the oldest football club, founded in 1893.

==== Romania ====
The oldest football club in Romania is Fotbal Club Baia Mare, founded in 1896.

==== Russia ====
In the Russian Empire, the first football teams were established by British expatriates, who founded clubs such as the British Athletic Club (1878) and the Vasileostrovsky Footballers' Society (1891).

The first football team composed of Russian nationals, KLS SPb (1897), emerged from the Saint-Petersburg Circle of Sports Enthusiasts.

The longest continuous football history has CSKA Moscow, tracing its origins back to the founding of OLLS in 1911.

==== Serbia ====
The oldest club in Serbia is Subotičko Sportsko Društvo (Szabadkai Sport Egylet), founded in 1898.

==== Slovakia ====
The oldest football club in Slovakia is 1. FC Tatran Prešov, founded in 1898, that after many name changes plays in the Slovak first league.

==== Slovenia ====
The first football club was founded in 1900 by the German minority in Ljubljana, the Laibacher Sportverein and got discontinued in 1909, followed by the Hungarian minority Lendevai FE in 1903, and the German minority in Celje (Athletik SK in 1906). In 1911, the first Slovenian football club of the Slovenian minority opened in Ljubljana, Ilirija, followed by Slovan two years later. Ilirija is nowadays considered by the Slovenian FA as the oldest running football club in the country, because the Lendava-based club went bankrupt in 2012, although it got recreated right away.

==== Spain ====
Founded on 23 December 1889, Recreativo de Huelva is considered the oldest football club in Spain, while Sevilla FC, founded in 1890, is considered the oldest Spanish football club solely devoted to football.

==== Sweden ====
The oldest active football club in Sweden is Örgryte IS, founded on 4 December 1887.

==== Switzerland ====
FC St. Gallen 1879 is the oldest active football club in Switzerland and the second oldest in continental Europe, founded on 19 April 1879 as FC St. Gallen.

==== Turkey ====
The first club founded within the present-day borders of Turkey was Panionios, founded in the city of Izmir in 1890. Being the club of the Greek community, it relocated to modern day Greece in 1922 after the population exchange between Greece and Turkey. The first Turkish sports club ever is Besiktas J.K. founded in 1903. Besiktas established their football branch in 1911. The first registered football club in the country was Galatasaray, founded in 1905.

=== Africa ===
==== Algeria ====
MC Algiers was founded in 1921. It is the oldest club in Algeria, and referred to as Le Doyen des clubs algerien (The Dean of Algerian Teams).

==== Egypt ====
Gezira SC was the oldest club in Egypt founded in 1882.

==== Ethiopia ====
Saint George S.C. was the oldest club in Ethiopia founded in 1935.

==== Ghana ====
Accra-based Hearts of Oak was founded in 1911. It is the oldest club in Ghana.

==== Morocco ====
Olympique Safi was founded in 1921. The club has currently been playing in Botola since the 2004–05 season.

==== South Africa ====
Hamilton Rugby Football Club was founded in March 1875 in Cape Town, and states that it is the oldest Rugby union club in South Africa.

==== Sudan ====
Al-Merrikh Sporting Club, based in Omdurman, is the oldest football in Sudan. It was established in 1908 as Al-Masalma Sporting Club, before changing its name to Al-Merrikh in 1927.

==== Tanzania ====
Young Africans was founded in 1935. It is the oldest club in Tanzania.

==== Tunisia ====
Espérance Sportive de Tunis was founded in 1919. It is the oldest club in Tunisia.

=== Asia ===
==== Bangladesh ====
In 1898, after the discontinuation of Wellington Club, a few of its sports-loving members decided to form the Wari Club.

==== Pakistan ====
One of the oldest clubs in Pakistan, is Karachi Port Trust formed in 1887.

==== Hong Kong ====
Some of the oldest clubs in Hong Kong include St Joseph's (1880), Hong Kong Football Club (1886), Buffs (1886), all formed by Britons. The first club formed by locals was South China AA (1904).

==== India ====
In India, some of the oldest clubs are Calcutta Football Club (founded in 1872, later merged with Calcutta Cricket Club founded in 1792 to form Calcutta Cricket and Football Club), Sarada FC, Aryan FC (1884), Sovabazar FC (1886), Mohun Bagan (1889), Mohammedan SC (1891), and East Bengal (1920). All of these clubs are from Kolkata.

==== Indonesia ====
The oldest football club in Indonesia was Gymnastiek Vereeniging, founded in the city of Medan in 1887.

The oldest still active football club in Indonesia is UMS 1905, founded in 1905, currently competing in Liga 4 Jakarta zone. Several local clubs in the 1900s during the Dutch East Indies era that entered into internal teams such as Hercules, Vios Batavia (Persija internal); Sidolig, POR UNI Bandung (Persib internal), and others.

==== Iraq ====
Al-Quwa Al-Jawiya is a Baghdad-based men's club founded in 1931 in Kingdom of Iraq under British Administration. It plays within the Iraqi Premier League.

==== Yemen ====
Al-Tilal Sports Club (Arabic: نادي التلال) is a Yemeni multi-sports club based in Aden, Yemen. The club was founded in 1905, making it one of the oldest football clubs in the Middle East and the oldest in the Arabian Peninsula. Al-Tilal Sports Club is a Yemeni football team that plays in the Yemeni League, the country's top football league.

==== Japan ====
In Japan, the oldest rugby (1866) and association football club (1886) is Yokohama Country & Athletic Club.

The oldest continuing association football club is Tokyo Shukyu-Dan, founded in 1917.

==== Pakistan ====
The oldest continuing association football clubs for men of nowadays Pakistan are believed to be Karachi Port Trust and Pakistan Railways, both founded during the British Raj. Karachi Port Trust football team is believed to have been founded in 1887, the year the Karachi Port Trust itself was established. The Pakistan Railways football team was founded in the 1880s North-Western Railway Football Club, as representative of the North Western State Railway in football competitions in British India. The team has been recorded as playing in several football tournaments in the 1890s in Lahore.

For women, the oldest club is Diya W.F.C., established in Karachi in 2002.

=== North America ===
Although football variants have been played in North America since the 1820s, the claim of oldest continuous football club in North America is still a matter of debate.

Oneida Football Club of Boston, Massachusetts, established in 1862, was the first organised team to play any kind of football in the United States. The game played by the club, known as the "Boston game", was an informal local variant that predated the codification of rules for either association or American football. The team, which consisted of graduates of Boston's elite preparatory schools, played on Boston Common from 1862 to 1865, during which time they reportedly never lost a game or even gave up a single point.

In terms of gridiron football, the Hamilton Tiger-Cats of the Canadian Football League can trace their roots back to the Hamilton Football Club (nicknamed the Tigers) which formed in 1869, then later merged with the Hamilton Wildcats in 1950 to form the current franchise. Their rivals to the east, the Toronto Argonauts, were founded four years later, in 1873, and have a mostly unchanged franchise history. Both clubs began as rugby football clubs and only later adapted to the gridiron-style of play which would become known as Canadian football. The oldest continuous rugby club in North America which still plays rugby is the McGill University Rugby Football Club, which was established in 1863, although their first recorded game was not until 1865. The oldest independent (non-university) rugby club is the Westmount Rugby Club of Montreal, which formed in 1876.

In 1869, Rutgers University and Princeton University competed in the first US intercollegiate football game. According to U.S. Soccer, the rules of this game resembled rugby and association football more closely than gridiron football. However, university-affiliated teams competing in intercollegiate championships are not typically classified as "clubs".

In the United States, gridiron-based variants of the game did not distinguish themselves from existing codes until 1871, when Harvard University began playing the Boston Game invented by Oneida. Its rules allowed a player to pick up the ball and run with it if he were chased and it quickly spread, with innovations added by Yale University student Walter Camp. The oldest existing non-university semiprofessional football club is the Watertown Red & Black, which was founded in 1896. The Arizona Cardinals, founded as the Morgan Athletic Club in Chicago in 1898, are the oldest team in the National Football League.

One of the first teams to have played football under the association rules in the US was Fall River Rovers, founded in 1884. The club existed intermittently until 1921. The Milwaukee Wave of the American Indoor Soccer Association, a professional indoor soccer team based in Milwaukee, Wisconsin, was founded in 1984, and is the oldest continuously operating professional soccer team of any kind in the United States. Founded in 1993, both Charleston Battery and Richmond Kickers are considered the oldest continuously operating professional soccer clubs in the United States to date. The ten charter members of Major League Soccer were all new clubs created shortly before the league began play in 1996. Nine of those ten clubs are still in existence. In 2011, the league admitted the Vancouver Whitecaps, who had existed continuously since 1986, and who were a phoenix club of the North American Soccer League side of the same name who were founded in 1974. Aside from the arguable exception of the Whitecaps, all of the other NASL clubs folded when the league folded in 1984. There is one American soccer club from an earlier first-division league still in existence: the Kearny Scots of the semi-pro Eastern Premier Soccer League have been around since the 1930s, when they were a longtime member of the American Soccer League. They won the ASL league championship five years in a row from 1937 through 1941.

==== Mexico ====
In Mexico, the oldest Football club is Club de Fútbol Pachuca, based in Pachuca, Hidalgo, that competes in Liga MX. Founded by Cornish miners from Camborne and Redruth in 1901, it is one of the oldest football clubs in the Americas, and was one of the founding members of the Mexican Primera División.

=== South America ===
==== Argentina ====
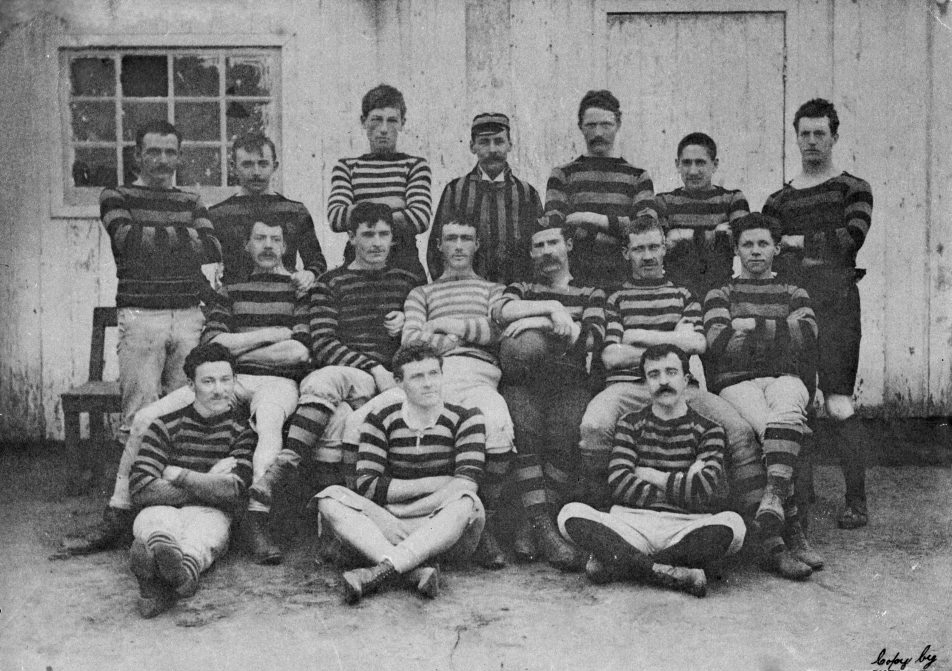
Argentine Rosario A.C. rugby union squad in 1884. This is supposed to be the oldest photo of a rugby team in the country

Buenos Aires Cricket & Rugby Club claims to be the oldest club still in existence in Argentina. According to the club's website, the club was founded before 8 December 1864 as a cricket institution. The date of foundation has been recognised by the Buenos Aires Rugby Union. It is however believed that the club was founded in 1831, with existing documentary evidence about a cricket match played by Buenos Aires that same year. Nevertheless, the practise of any "football" code did not start until 1951 when the BACC merged with the Buenos Aires F.C. and rugby union was added.

Club Atlético del Rosario was officially established in 1867 as a cricket institution. The club soon added association football, being the first club from Rosario playing in the Primera División, the top division of Argentina. In rugby union, Rosario AC played the first inter-clubs match in the country on 28 June 1886, when the team faced Buenos Aires Football Club.

Having been established in 1875, Club Mercedes is considered the oldest association football club still in existence in Argentina. This places Mercedes above Gimnasia y Esgrima La Plata and Quilmes, both founded in 1887.

==== Bolivia ====
Oruro Royal, founded on 26 May 1896 by the English workers hired by the Bolivian Government to build the national railways, is considered the first Bolivian football club.

==== Brazil ====
São Paulo Athletic Club, founded on 13 May 1888 by English immigrants as a cricket club, could be considered the oldest Brazilian club to have played any code of "football", starting to play association football in 1898. After football retired from competitions in 1912, rugby union became the main sport of SPAC.

The oldest club to have been in continuous activity in association football is S.C. Rio Grande, founded in July 1900. Clube Náutico Capibaribe, founded in April 1901, is the oldest in northeast region.

São Paulo Railway Company and São Paulo Gaz Company, both established in 1895 (and then defunct) played the first football match in Brazil that same year.

==== Chile ====
Santiago Wanderers was founded on 15 August 1892 by Irish community and was the first football club in Chile.

==== Colombia ====
"Cali Football Club" was formed in 1908 by students under the leadership of Nazario Lalinde, Juan Pablo Lalinde and Fidel Lalinde, who came back from Europe bringing football to the city of Cali, but in 1912 the students under the leadership of the three Lalinde brothers organized the team and renamed it as Deportivo Cali, being regarded as the oldest football club still in existence,

Origins of football in Colombia dates to early 1900 with the expansion of the railway network in the country that carried coffee to the main cities and pioneer Arturo de Castro encouraging young people to play football. "Barranquilla Football Club" (not to be confused with its homonymous club established in 2005), was founded by de Castro and British railway workers in 1908, and considered the first football club in Colombia.

==== Peru ====
Lima Cricket and Football Club claims to be the oldest football-practising club in Peru and the Americas, having been founded in 1859 by the city's British community.

==== Uruguay ====
In Uruguay, the Montevideo Cricket Club, established in 1861, has however been ranked as the oldest rugby union club outside Europe by the World Rugby Museum of Twickenham, although the first certain rugby match played by MVCC was in 1875.

=== Oceania ===
==== Australia ====
The oldest Australian rules football club is the Melbourne Football Club, founded in 1858 as a rugby club, which still plays professionally, making it the oldest extant professional football club of any football code in the world. In 1859 two other clubs were also founded, Geelong, which still plays professionally today, and University, who played in the top level of Victorian senior football in 1885–1888 and 1908–1914. Many more Australian Rules clubs were formed over the next few decades, including the following professional clubs playing in the Australian Football League (AFL), the peak Australian Rules competition: Carlton (1864), North Melbourne (1869), Port Adelaide (1870), Essendon (1872), St Kilda (1873), South Melbourne (now Sydney, 1874), Western Bulldogs (originally named Footscray, 1877), Fitzroy (now the Brisbane Lions, 1883), Richmond (1885), and Collingwood (1892).

The first football club in Australia to adopt rugby rules at its founding meeting was the Wallaroo FC in Sydney in 1870. The Sydney University FC cites a founding date of 1863, playing external games under ad hoc football rules until adopting rugby following the arrival of the Wallaroos. Outside of teams from educational and military institutions, no present day rugby union clubs in Australia were founded prior to 1900 and/or hold a continuous existence. Super Rugby clubs (1996-present) Waratahs and Reds were founded in 1882 as New South Wales and Queensland state representative teams respectively.

The first association football club formed was Sydney's Wanderers FC in 1880, while the oldest club in Australia currently in existence is Balgownie Rangers, formed in 1883 in Wollongong.

==== New Zealand ====
Christchurch Football Club, established in 1863, is the oldest football club of any code in New Zealand. The club initially played using its own rules, before converting to rugby football. Wellington Football Club, based in Hataitai, was established in 1870 and is the oldest continuous rugby football club in New Zealand. The honour of being the country's first organised association football club is likely to belong to Auckland's North Shore United, which was founded as North Shore in 1886. Two Dunedin-based clubs, Northern and Wakari, were officially founded in 1888, although it is possible that Northern had been playing as a team prior to this time.

== Oldest school football clubs ==
These are the earliest schools to have evidence of regular, organised football. Each school would originally have played its own code.

Date	School	Codes currently played	Notes
1766	Eton College	Eton wall game, Eton field game, Association, Rugby union	Football described as "Goals" and football fields established by 1766.
1790	Rugby School	Rugby union, Association	Walter Savage Landor played at the school circa 1787-1791.
1794	Charterhouse School	Association	Football part of the school song in 1794. Played in the cloisters.
1814	Harrow School	Harrow football, Rugby union, Association	Football first mentioned in 1814 school diary.
1815	Westminster School	Association	Earliest reference in 1815 school documents. Played in the cloisters until the 1820s.
1825	Winchester College	Winchester College Football, Association	First known rules from 1825, 25 players a side.
1836	Shrewsbury School	Association, Rugby union	Established by new headmaster B.H. Kennedy in 1836.
1840	Haileybury College	Original school closed 1858	Football played from at least 1840 when ex-Rugby pupil joined the school.
1844	Cheltenham College	Rugby union, association	College Rugby club established 1844 by ex-Rugby school pupils.
1846	Sherborne School	Rugby union	Introduced by Headmaster Penrose in 1846.
1850	Lancing College	Association	Football began two years after college founded.
1850	Durham School	Rugby union, Association	Club founded in 1850.
1852	Marlborough College	Rugby union, Association	First record of school match in 1852.
1852	Radley College	Rugby union, Association	Early pupil describes first football in 1852.
1854	Edinburgh Academy	Rugby union, Association	Crombie brothers introduced rugby rules from Durham School in 1854.
1856	Royal High School, Edinburgh	Rugby union, Association	Rugby rules brought to the school in 1856 by an English public schoolboy.
1856	Repton School	Association	Large school games played from circa 1856.
1856	Bedford School	Rugby union, Association	First record of match versus Bedford town eleven in 1856.
1857	Tonbridge School	Rugby union, Association	First record of school match.
1857	Uppingham School	Rugby union, Association	First football rules established in 1857.
1857	Forest School	Association	Established by new headmaster F.B. Guy in 1857.
1858	Chigwell School	Association	First recorded match in 1858.
1858	Melbourne Grammar School	Australian	First recorded match on 7 August 1858. Continues to contest the Cordner–Eggleston Cup.
1858	Scotch College, Melbourne	Australian	First recorded match on 7 August 1858. Continues to contest the Cordner–Eggleston Cup.
1858	Rossall School	Association	First recorded match in 1858.
1858	Merchiston Castle School	Rugby union, Association	First recorded match in 1858.
1859	Mill Hill School	Rugby union, Association	Gravel football pitch established by 1859.
1859	Brighton College	Rugby union, Association	First reported match in 1859.
1859	Merchant Taylors' School	Rugby union, Association	School club established 1859.
1862	Highgate School	Association	First recorded matches in 1862.

- Aldenham School F.C. was reported in The Football Annual 1873 (Charles Alcock) to have been founded in 1825 but there are no primary sources to support this and it is disputed.

== Chronology of oldest clubs ==
=== Before 1860 ===
Date	Club	Original code	Current codes	City/Suburb	Country	League	Notes
1843	Guy's Hospital	Rugby football	Rugby union	Blackheath	England	BUCS Rugby League	Oldest documented football club in the world and founding member of United Hospitals RFC Now known as Guy's, King's and St Thomas' Rugby Football Club.
1854	Dublin University	Rugby football	Rugby union	Trinity College	(Republic of Ireland) Ireland	All-Ireland League	Oldest documented football club in Ireland and the oldest to later play Rugby union. Now playing in the All-Ireland League Division 1A.
1856–57	Cambridge University	Cambridge rules	Association football	Cambridge	England	BUCS Midlands Division 2A	Official university publications have claimed that the club was formed in 1856, being also recognised as such by The Football Association. The FA awarded Cambridge a plaque in 2006 in honour of its "150th anniversary", giving its foundation date official recognition. Nevertheless, other sources state that the date of establisnment of the Cambridge AFC is not clear enough, setting it between 1856 and 1866, but ranking it 2nd after Sheffield.
1857, 24 October	Sheffield	Sheffield Rules	Association football	Sheffield	England	Northern Premier League Division One East	FA and FIFA recognised the club as the oldest now playing association football.
1857, 10 November	Liverpool St Helens	Rugby football	Rugby union	Liverpool	England	North 1 West	The club's first match took place in 1857 when old boys from Rugby school challenged local boys to a game under the Rugby school rules. Liverpool Football Club were then formed. The oldest open rugby club, not part of an institution, in the world.
1857, 26 December	Edinburgh Academical	Rugby football	Rugby union	Edinburgh	Scotland	Scottish Premiership	Oldest football club in Scotland. Oldest documented rugby club in the UK.
1857	Edinburgh University	Rugby football	Rugby union	Edinburgh	Scotland	BUCS Rugby Union Premier North B	Joined the RFU in 1871 but resigned to become a founder member of the Scottish Football Union in 1873.
1858	Blackheath	Rugby football	Rugby union	Blackheath	England	National League 1	Foundation member of the FA.
1858	University of St Andrews	Rugby football	Rugby union	St Andrews	Scotland	BUCS Scotland Div. 1	Founder member of the SRU.
1859, 14 May	Melbourne	Australian football	Australian football	Melbourne	Australia	Australian Football League	A loosely organised side played as Melbourne on several occasions in 1858. The club was officially formed the following year on 14 May 1859. On 17 May 1859, members of the club codified Australian rules football. It is the world's oldest football club of any code that is now professional.
1859, 14 June (Note: Disputed, poorly documented or dormant for a period.)	Castlemaine	Australian football	Australian football	Castlemaine	Australia	Bendigo Football League	Foundation date recently rediscovered, but dormant for a period.
1859	Melbourne University	Australian football	Australian football	Melbourne University	Australia	Victorian Amateur Football Association Section A	Records of its formation are lost, however there are references of the club dating back to June 1859 and its first match was also in June 1859. Won Australian rules first ever trophy in 1861 by defeating Melbourne. Disbanded during World War I, but later reformed.
1859, 18 July	Geelong	Australian football	Australian football	Geelong	Australia	Australian Football League	The club's own code was played in the Geelong region and influenced the rewriting of the laws of Australian football in 1866.

=== 1860–1869 ===
Date	Club	Original code	Current codes	City/Suburb	Country	Status	Notes
1860	Merchistonian FC	Rugby football	Rugby union	Edinburgh	Scotland		
1860, 20 May	Ballarat	Australian football	Australian football	Ballarat	Australia	Ballarat Football League	Formed as a junior club; senior club established in 1862.
1860	Exeter University RFC	Rugby football	Rugby union	Exeter	England	BUCS Super Rugby	
1860	Cray Wanderers	(Unknown)	Association Football	Bromley	England	Isthmian League Premier Division	Early years are poorly documented with its early history based on oral recollections later in the 19th century. Based on the frequently stated year of 1860, it is the oldest club now playing association football in Greater London., preceding Civil Service F.C., the only surviving foundation member of the FA, by three years.
1860	Hallam	Sheffield Rules	Association football	Sheffield	England	Northern Premier League Division One East	Took part in first ever football tournament. Original club dissolved in 1886.
1860	Manchester	Rugby football	Rugby union	Manchester	England	South Lancs/Cheshire 1	No connection to association football clubs Manchester United F.C. or Manchester City F.C.
1861	University of Toronto	Canadian Football	Canadian Football	Toronto	Canada	U Sports football	The first documented game of Canadian Football. This sport entered the US in 1874 and spawned American football, a Canadian football variant.
1861	Sandhurst	Australian football	Australian football	Bendigo	Australia	Bendigo Football League	Founded by J. B. Thompson, one of the inventors of Australian rules football.
1861	Richmond	Rugby football	Rugby union	Richmond	England	National League 1	One of the first two clubs (with Barnes) to play a game of Association football, despite not being a member of the FA.
1861	Sale Sharks	Rugby football	Rugby union	Sale	England	Gallagher Premiership	Currently in the peak domestic competition for rugby union in England.
1861, 18 July	Modbury	Australian football	Australian football	Modbury	Australia	South Australian Amateur Football League	
1862	Notts County	Own code	Association football	Nottingham	England	EFL League One	NCFC official site history: Oldest of all the association football clubs in the world that are now professional. Club officially founded December 1864, prior to this only existed informally.
1863	St. George's Hospital Medical School	Rugby football	Rugby union	Hyde Park Corner	England	BUCS league, South Eastern Conference, League 2A	Founding member of United Hospitals RFC, and the only one of the original United Hospitals members that is in the same form as at inception. The team moved to Tooting, South West London, in the 1970s.
1863	Bradford	Rugby football	Association football	Bradford	England	Northern Premier League Division One East	Founding member of Northern Union (RFL) in 1895. Changed codes in 1907 and renamed Bradford Park Avenue A.F.C., which folded in 1974 and reformed in 1988.
1863, 18 October	Darlington RFC	Rugby football	Rugby union	Darlington	England	Durham/Northumberland 1	Founding member of Durham County RFU.
1863	Christchurch	Own code	Rugby union	Christchurch	New Zealand	Division One - Telecom Cup	Oldest football club of any code in New Zealand.
1863	Sydney University	Rugby football, Australian football	Rugby union	University of Sydney	Australia	New South Wales Rugby Union	Foundation date disputed by historian Tom Hickie who argues that it was actually 1865. The oldest Australian rugby union club; according to fullpointsfooty.net, it "flirted with 'Victorian Rules' [Australian rules] in its formative stages." The current Australian rules club at the university, Sydney University Australian National Football Club, claims to be a spin-off of SUFC, although the university did not play an inter-club Australian rules game until 1887.
1863	Royal Engineers	(Unknown)	Association football	London	England	British Army competition	Won the FA Cup in 1875.
1863	CS Rugby 1863	Rugby football	Rugby union	London	England	Regional 1 South East	
1863	Civil Service	Association football	Association football	London	England	Southern Amateur League Senior Division 1	The only founding member of the FA that still plays association football. The other founding clubs now play rugby or are defunct. Also known as the War Office Club.
1864, October	Wrexham	Association football	Association football	Wrexham	Wales	EFL Championship	When the National Library of Wales digitised its Newspaper Archive in 2012, new evidence was discovered that proved Wrexham AFC were formed in 1864 rather than 1872, which was previously accepted as the foundation date. Founded by members of Wrexham Cricket Club. The oldest football club in Wales of any code.
1864	Huddersfield	Rugby football	Rugby league	Huddersfield	England	Super League	The world's oldest rugby league club. It celebrated its 150th anniversary in 2014.
1864	Carlton	Australian football	Australian football	Carlton	Australia	Australian Football League	Source: Carlton Football Club. Carlton has participated at the highest level of its code longer than any other club.
1864	Williamstown	Australian football	Australian football	Williamstown	Australia	Victorian Football League	The second club from Williamstown which exists.
1864	Brigg Town	Association football	Association football	Brigg	England	Northern Counties East League Division One	Traditional date.
1864, 8 December	Buenos Aires C&RC	Cricket	Rugby union	San Fernando	Argentina	URBA Primera A	Although BACRC's itself sets the date of foundation "before 8 December 1864"., some historians claim that there is documentary evidence about a cricket match played by the club in 1831.
1865	West of Scotland	Rugby football	Rugby union	Glasgow	Scotland	Scottish National League Division Three	One of the founder members of the SRU.
1865	Wimbledon	Rugby football	Rugby union	Wimbledon	England	National League 2 East	The club set its year of foundation on the first recorded match, 26 Dec 1865 v Richmond FC.
1865	Bath	Rugby football	Rugby union	Bath	England	Gallagher Premiership	Currently in the peak domestic competition for rugby union in England.
1865	Hull	Rugby football	Rugby league	Kingston upon Hull	England	Super League	The world's second-oldest rugby league club.
1865	Nottingham Forest	Association football	Association football	Nottingham	England	Premier League	The EFL confirmed that Nottingham Forest are now the second oldest member club, after Notts County, due to the lack of evidence to support Stoke City's claim of having formed in 1863.
1865	Penola Football Club	Australian football	Australian football	Penola	Australia	Kowree Naracoorte Tatiara Football League	Claims that the club was founded in 1865. Meeting held on 25 July 1868. Confirmed to have been challenged by the Mount Gambier Football Club in 1869.
1866	Madras College FP RFC	Rugby football	Rugby union	St Andrews	Scotland	Caledonia Midlands Division Two	
1866	Yokohama Foot Ball Club	Rugby football	Rugby union	Yokohama	Japan		First rugby club in Japan. Part of Yokohama Country & Athletic Club since 1884.
1866	Harlequins	Rugby football	Rugby union	Twickenham	England	Gallagher Premiership	Founded as Hampstead Football Club, the club was renamed Harlequin Football Club in 1870 as the membership had ceased to be mainly Hampstead based. As the club's equipment and stationery was all monogrammed HFC, a dictionary was used to find an acceptable alternative name to Hampstead beginning with an H and all members agreed on Harlequin.
1866	Glasgow Academicals	Rugby football	Rugby union	Glasgow	Scotland	Scottish National League Division One	One of the founder members of the SRU.
1866	Kapunda	Australian football	Australian football	Kapunda	Australia	Barossa Light & Gawler Football Association	
1866, 20 October	Swinton and Pendlebury	Rugby football	Rugby league	Swinton	England	RFL Championship	Won three rugby league Challenge Cups and six championships
1867	Wasps FC	Rugby football	Rugby union	Acton	England	Counties 1 Middlesex	Hampstead Football Club was founded in 1866. A split in the membership resulted in the formation of two different clubs: Harlequin F.C. and Wasps. Wasps Football Club was itself formed in 1867 at the now-defunct Eton and Middlesex Tavern in North London. names of insects, birds, and other animals were considered fashionable in the Victorian period.
1867, 27 March	Atlético del Rosario	Cricket	Rugby union	Rosario	Argentina	Top 12	The first rugby union match (which was also the first inter-clubs match in Argentina) was played on 28 June 1886, vs. Buenos Aires F.C.
1867, 9 July	Queen's Park	Own code	Association football	Glasgow	Scotland	Scottish Championship	Until November 2019 the club operated as the only existing amateur club playing in the Scottish Professional Football League.
1867, 4 September	Sheffield Wednesday	Sheffield Rules	Association football	Sheffield	England	EFL League One	The Wednesday Cricket Club formed 1820 in Darnall, Sheffield. Sometimes known as Darnall Wednesday C.C or Sheffield Wednesday C.C. In 1867 a football section was formed known as The Wednesday Football Club. In 1929 the football club officially changed its name to Sheffield Wednesday Football Club.
1868	North of Ireland F.C.	Rugby football	Rugby union	Belfast	Northern Ireland	All-Ireland League	
1868	Royal HSFP	Rugby football	Rugby union	Edinburgh	Scotland	East Division Three	
1868	Tiverton	Rugby football	Rugby union	Tiverton	England	Tribute Cornwall/Devon League	Tiverton Rugby Club is known as Devon's oldest club.
1868	Fordingbridge Turks	(Unknown)	Association football	Fordingbridge	England	Bournemouth Saturday Football League	
1868	Perthshire	Rugby football	Rugby union	Perth	Scotland	Caledonia Division One Midlands	
1868	Brighton F.C.	Rugby football	Rugby union	Brighton	England	London & South East Premier	As they were founded before the RFU they are one of the few clubs who are designated F.C. rather than R.F.C.
1868	Geelong Grammar School Football Club	Australian football	Australian football	Geelong	Australia	APS Schools Football	
1868	Stoke City	Charterhouse rules	Association football	Stoke-on-Trent	England	EFL Championship	Club uses founding date of 1863, because of claims of a Charterhouse School old boys' team in Stoke in that year; however the names mentioned were still at the school in 1863. Newspaper report confirms foundation date of 1868, as Stoke Ramblers, which was soon renamed Stoke Football Club. First contested FA Cup in 1883–84. Continuous history from reformation in 1908 following the wind up of the original club. Renamed Stoke City in 1928 after Stoke-on-Trent was granted city status.
1868	Kyneton Football Club	Australian football	Australian football	Kyneton	Australia	APS Schools Football	
1869	Preston Grasshoppers R.F.C.	Rugby football	Rugby union	Preston, Lancashire	England	National League 2 North	
1869	King's College London Rugby Football Club	Rugby football	Rugby union	London	England	BUCS Rugby League	
1869, 24 July	Creswick Football Club	Australian football	Australian football	Creswick	Australia	Central Highlands Football League	
1869	Oxford University RFC	Rugby football	Rugby union	Oxford	England		The club contests The Varsity Match every year against Cambridge University at Twickenham.
1869	Glasgow University	Rugby football	Rugby union	Glasgow	Scotland	Scottish University competitions	
1869	Queen's University	Rugby Football	Rugby Union	Queen's University Belfast	Northern Ireland	All-Ireland League	Second oldest club in Northern Ireland. Current in Division 2A
1869, 3 November	Hamilton	Rugby Football	Canadian football	Hamilton	Canada	Canadian Football League	The HFBC were nicknamed the "Tigers" in 1873. Merged with the Hamilton Flying Wildcats in 1950 to form the Hamilton Tiger-Cats. Oldest current professional gridiron football team.
1869	North Melbourne	Australian football	Australian football	North Melbourne	Australia	Australian Football League	Was briefly known as the 'Hotham Football Club' between 1877 and 1888, due to a change in the town's name.
1869	Kilmarnock	Rugby football	Association football	Kilmarnock	Scotland	Scottish Premiership	
1869	Princeton University	Association football	American football	Princeton	United States	Ivy League	Played the first intercollegiate football game vs Rutgers. As other teams of that era, they then switched to rugby and finally to "American" football.
1869	Rutgers University	Association football	American football	New Jersey	United States	Big Ten Conference	Played the first intercollegiate football game vs Princeton. As other teams of that era, they then switched to rugby and finally to "American" football.

=== 1870–1879 ===
Date	Club	Original code	Current codes	City/Suburb	Country	Status	Notes
1870	Columbia University	Association football	American football	New York	United States	Ivy League	Third oldest continuous American football team in the United States.
1870	Wellington Football Club	Rugby football	Rugby union	Wellington	New Zealand	Wellington RFU Premier	Oldest continuous rugby football club in New Zealand.
1870	Maidenhead United	Association football	Association football	Maidenhead	England	National League	
1870	Leeds Rhinos	Rugby football	Rugby League	Leeds	England	Super League	
1870	Southend	Rugby football	Rugby union	Southend	England	National League 2 South	
1870, 12 May	Port Adelaide	Australian football	Australian football	Port Adelaide	Australia	Australian Football League	Played in the SANFL until 1997 when it entered the AFL. Only pre-existing non-Victorian club to be competing in the league. They are South Australia's oldest football and Australia's Most Successful football Club.
1870	Stranraer	Association football	Association football	Stranraer	Scotland	Scottish League Two	
1870	Abingdon Town		Association football	Abingdon	England	Hellenic Football League	
1870	Darwen	Rugby football	Association football	Darwen	England	West Lancashire Football League	The club was wound up in 2009 and later reformed as AFC Darwen.
1870	Burton	Rugby football	Rugby union	Burton upon Trent	England	Regional 1 Midlands	The club has since changed its name to Burton Rugby Football Club
1870, 22 November	Marlow	Association football	Association football	Marlow	England	Southern Football League	
1870	Reigate Priory	Association football	Association football	Reigate	England	Surrey Elite Intermediate Football League	Participated in the first ever FA Cup draw. Believed to be the oldest club in Surrey. Still playing on their original ground.
1871	Aberdeen University RFC	Rugby Football	Rugby union	Aberdeen	Scotland	Caledonia Regional League	
1871	Ealing Trailfinders	Rugby Football	Rugby union	Ealing, London	England	RFU Championship	The club played its first match in 1869 but the official date of establishment was set up in 1871.
1871	Exeter Chiefs	Rugby Football	Rugby union	Exeter	England	Premiership Rugby	Exeter Rugby Club was founded in 1871. The club played its first match in 1873 against St. Luke's College. In 1890, they won the Devon Cup.
1871	Henley Town Football Club	Football Oxfordshire		Henley on Thames	England		
1871	Ararat Football Club	Australian football	Australian football	Ararat	Australia	Wimmera Football League	
1871	Streatham-Croydon RFC	Rugby Football	Rugby Union	Thornton Heath	England		Founded as Streatham Rugby Club but later incorporated Croydon following a move from Streatham Common to Thornton Heath.
1871	Neath RFC	Rugby football	Rugby union	Neath	Wales	Welsh Rugby Union Premiership	
1871	Southall	Association Football	Association Football	Southall	England	Isthmian League South Central Division	
1871	Uxbridge	Association Football	Association Football	Uxbridge	England	Southern Football League Division One Central	
1871	Birkenhead Park	Rugby Football	Rugby union	Birkenhead	England	National League 3 North	
1871	Langholm	Rugby Football	Rugby union	Langolm	Scotland	East Division One	
1871	Rochdale Hornets	Rugby football	Rugby league	Rochdale	England	Championship 1	
1871	Worcester Warriors	Rugby Football	Rugby union	Worcester	England	Premiership Rugby	Worcester Rugby Football Club dates back to 1871 and owes its foundations to the cleric Rev Francis John Eld. The playing side made their first outing on 8 November 1871 against the Worcester Artillery at Somerset Place.
1871, 9 November	Oxford University	Association football	Association football	Oxford	England	BUCS Football League	
1871, 25 December	Reading	Association football	Association football	Reading	England	Football League Championship	
1872	Cambridge University R.U.F.C.	Rugby football	Rugby union	Cambridge	England		The team plays Oxford University RFC in the annual Varsity Match at Twickenham Stadium every December.
1872	Lutterworth	Rugby Football	Rugby Union	Lutterworth	England	Midlands 2 East (South)	
1872	Edinburgh Rugby	Rugby Football	Rugby Union	Edinburgh	Scotland	United Rugby Championship	
1872	Glasgow Warriors	Rugby Football	Rugby Union	Glasgow	Scotland	United Rugby Championship	
1872	Lansdowne Football Club	Rugby Football	Rugby Union	Dublin	(Republic of Ireland) Ireland	All-Ireland League	
1872	Swansea RFC	Rugby football	Rugby union	Swansea	Wales	Super Rygbi Cymru	
1872	Dumbarton	Association football	Association football	Dumbarton	Scotland	Scottish League Two	Founder member of the Scottish Football League, and joint winners of the first Scottish Football League title in 1890–1.
1872	Rangers	Association football	Association football	Glasgow	Scotland	Scottish Premiership	Founder member of the Scottish Football League, and joint winners of the first Scottish Football League title in 1890–1.
1872	Heidelberger RK	Rugby football	Rugby union	Heidelberg	Germany	Rugby-Bundesliga	
1872	Clifton	Rugby football	Rugby union	Clifton	England	National League 2 South	
1872	Llanelli RFC	Rugby football	Rugby union	Llanelli	Wales	Welsh Rugby Union Premiership	
October 1872	Cefn Druids	Association Football	Association Football	Wrexham	Wales	Cymru Premier	Year of 1872 claimed in club's official history. Druids merged with Acrefair United in August 1927 to form Druids United. Druids United merged with Cefn Albion in 1992 to form Cefn Druids. There are many discrepancies in club's official history when compared to primary historical sources. Newspaper Archives show club was formed as Ruabon Rovers in October 1872. Newspaper Archives also state club was formed as Plasmadoc in 1874. Druids name does not appear anywhere until 1876.
1872	Wigan Warriors	Rugby football	Rugby league	Wigan	England	Super League	
1872	Cuckfield Town FC	Association football	Association football	Cuckfield	England	Mid Sussex Football League	Founded by Mr. Wyndham Burrell and Mr. G.T. Bunting in 1872 as claimed in club's official history. and founder members of the Mid Sussex League in 1900.
1872	Essendon	Australian football	Australian football	Essendon	Australia	Australian Football League	Although the exact date of foundation is still unclear, Essendon thought to have formed in 1872 at the home of Robert McCracken
1872	Calcutta FC	Rugby football	Association Football	Kolkata	India	Calcutta Premier Division C	Oldest football club in Asia; Now known as "Calcutta Cricket and Football Club" after the merger with Calcutta Cricket Club in 1965.
1872	Yale University	Association football	American football	New Haven	United States	Ivy League	Yale started practising association football, then switching to rugby in 1876, and finally to "American" football after the rule changes introduced by Walter Camp.
1872, December	Harvard RFC	Boston game	Rugby union	Boston	United States	Ivy League	The oldest rugby union club in the U.S.
1873, 2 April	St Kilda	Australian football	Australian football	St Kilda	Australia	Australian Football League	
1873	Birmingham Moseley Rugby	Rugby football	Rugby union	Birmingham	England	National League 1	
1873, 3 May	North Shore Rugby Football Club	Rugby football	Rugby union	Devonport, Auckland	New Zealand	North Harbour Rugby Union	The oldest football club of any code in Auckland.
1873	Gloucester Rugby	Rugby Football	Rugby union	Gloucester	England	Premiership Rugby	The club was formed in 1873 after a meeting at the Spread Eagle Hotel with the announcement in the Gloucester Journal: "A football club (as rugby was then called) has been formed in this city – the season's operations begin at the Spa on the first Tuesday in next month." a team was then organized to play the college school, which was actually played on the current Kingsholm ground.
1873	St Helens	Rugby football	Rugby league	St. Helens	England	Super League	
1873	Wakefield Trinity	Rugby football	Rugby league	Wakefield	England	Super League	
1873	Toronto Argonauts	Rugby football	Canadian football	Toronto	Canada	Canadian Football League	Founded as a rugby team by the Toronto Argonaut Rowing Club, itself founded the year previous in 1872.
1873	Halifax	Rugby football	Rugby League	Halifax	England	Championship	Founding members of the Northern Rugby Union.
1873	Halesowen Town	Association football	Association football	Halesowen	England	Southern Football League Division One Central	
1873	Chippenham Town	Association football	Association football	Chippenham	England	Southern Football League	
1873	Exmouth	Rugby football	Rugby union	Exmouth	England	National League 2 South	
1873, 1 October	Kirkcaldy	Rugby football	Rugby union	Kirkcaldy	Scotland	Scottish National League Division Two	Founded in 1873 but played its first recorded match on 3 January 1874.
1873	Salford Red Devils	Rugby football	Rugby league	Salford	England	Super League	
1874	Coventry R.F.C.	Rugby Football	Rugby union	Coventry	England	RFU Championship	In 1874 a group, including members of Stoke Cricket Club, took part in what could be described as the first organised game of rugby football played in Coventry.
1874, 8 June	Rochester Football Club	Australian football	Australian football	Rochester	Australia	Goulburn Valley Football League	
1874, 19 June	Sydney Swans	Australian football	Australian football	Sydney	Australia	Australian Football League	Previously located and known as South Melbourne. Relocated to Sydney in 1981.
1874	Port Melbourne	Australian football	Australian football	Port Melbourne	Australia	Victorian Football League	
1874	Blues	Rugby football	Rugby union	Invercargill	New Zealand	Southland RFU Premier	Oldest football club in Southland.
1874	Ponsonby RFC	Rugby football	Rugby union	Auckland	New Zealand	Auckland RFU Premier	The oldest club in the Auckland union; the second oldest football club of any code in Auckland.
1874	Newport RFC	Rugby football	Rugby union	Newport, Wales	Wales	Super Rygbi Cymru	
1874	Bolton Wanderers	Association Football	Association Football	Bolton	England	EFL Championship	The club was founded as Christ Church and was one of the founder members of the Football League in 1888.
1874	Greenock Morton	Association Football	Association Football	Greenock	Scotland	Scottish Championship	
1874	Arthurlie	Association Football	Association Football	Barrhead	Scotland	West of Scotland League Premier Division	
1874	Heart of Midlothian	Association football	Association football	Edinburgh	Scotland	Scottish Premiership	
1874	Hamilton Academical	Association football	Association football	Hamilton	Scotland	Scottish League One	
1874	Aston Villa	Association football	Association football	Villa Cross	England	Premier League	Founded in 1874, also founder member of the Football League.
1874	Northwich Victoria	Association football	Association football	Northwich	England	Northern Premier League Premier Division	The foundation date of Northwich Victoria was at least as early as 1874. Founding member of the Cheshire FA, the Football League Second Division, The Combination and Cheshire County League. Their home ground Drill Field, at the time of its demolition in 2002, it was believed to be the oldest football ground in the world.
1874	Macclesfield Town	Association football	Association football	Macclesfield	England	Football League 2	
1874	Portarlington Demons	Australian football	Australian football	Portarlington	Australia	Bellarine Football League	
1875	Watsonian FC	Rugby Football	Rugby union	Edinburgh	Scotland	Scottish Premiership	The Watsonian Football Club played its first game on 30 January 1875 against St George that ended in a draw.
1875	Doncaster Knights	Rugby Football	Rugby union	Doncaster	England	RFU Championship	Doncaster Rugby Football Club was founded in 1875 although there is some evidence of a rugby side in the town at an even earlier date.
1875	Lampeter Town	Rugby football	Rugby union	Lampeter	Wales	WRU Division Four West	Officially recognised by the Welsh Rugby Union as the oldest Rugby Club in Wales, when the Reverend Rowland Williams brought the game with him to the college in 1850. The club currently plays within the British Universities and Colleges Sports (BUCS) league system.
1875	Durham University RFC	Rugby Football	Rugby union	Durham	England	BUCS Super Rugby	
1876	Carmarthen Quins RFC	Rugby football	Rugby union	Carmarthen	Wales	Super Rygbi Cymru	
1875	Birmingham City	Association football	Association football	Small Heath	England	EFL Championship	
1875	Blackburn Rovers	Association football	Association football	Blackburn	England	EFL Championship	Founder members of both the Football League and the Premier League.
1875, 11 September	Bournemouth	Association football	Association football	Bournemouth	England	Wessex League	Known as Bournemouth Poppies to avoid confusion with the Football League Club AFC Bournemouth Founder Member of the Football Association, the Hampshire F.A. and the Bournemouth F.A.
1875	Dewsbury Rams	Rugby Football	Rugby League	Dewsbury	England	RFL Championship	Won 2 Challenge Cups (1911–12, 1942–43) and 1 Championship (1972–73).
1875	Hibernian	Association football	Association football	Edinburgh	Scotland	Scottish Premiership	The Edinburgh derby match between Heart of Midlothian and Hibernian is the oldest regularly played derby match in the world.
1875	Club Mercedes	Association football	Association football	Mercedes	Argentina	Primera D	The oldest club currently competing in any Argentine association football league.
1875	Redruth	Rugby football	Rugby union	Cornwall	England	National League 2 South	
1875	Taunton	Rugby Football	Rugby union	Taunton	England	National League 2 South	
1875	Widnes Vikings	Rugby football	Rugby league	Widnes	England	Super League	Formed late 1875 as Farnworth & Appleton FC, becoming Widnes FC in May 1876 playing rugby rules although two games were played under Association rules versus Northwich Victoria in the first two seasons.
1875	Newtown AFC	Association football	Association football	Newtown	Wales	Cymru Premier	Year of 1875 claimed in club's official history as this is the foundation date of Newtown White Stars. Newtown AFC formed in 1885 when Newtown White Stars merged with Newtown Excelsior.
1875	Montevideo C.C.	Cricket	Rugby union	Montevideo	Uruguay	Campeonato Uruguayo	The first sport practised was cricket, then adding association football and rugby. 1875 indicates the first registered rugby game by MVCC, although the sport had been introduced before.
1875	Barrow Raiders	Rugby football	Rugby league	Barrow-in-Furness	England	League 1	Joined the Northern Rugby Football Union came in 1897
1876	Saracens F.C.	Rugby Football	Rugby union	London	England	Premiership Rugby	Saracens were founded in 1876 by the Old Boys of the Philological School in Marylebone, London (later to become St Marylebone Grammar School).
1876	Plymouth Albion R.F.C.	Rugby Football	Rugby union	Plymouth	England	National League 1	
1876	Cardiff RFC	Rugby football	Rugby union	Cardiff	Wales	Super Rygbi Cymru	
1876	Aberavon RFC	Rugby football	Rugby union	Port Talbot	Wales	Super Rygbi Cymru	
1876	Clontarf F.C.	Rugby Football	Rugby union	Clontarf, Dublin	(Republic of Ireland) Ireland	All-Ireland League	
1876	Old Carthusians	Association football	Association football	Surrey	England	Arthurian League	
1876	Old Foresters	Association football	Association football	London	England	Arthurian League	Forest School, Walthamstow, started playing football c.1857. The Old Foresters played from shortly after this year, the earliest recorded match versus Forest School in September 1864, but the club was not officially formed until 1876.
1876	South Adelaide	Australian football	Australian football	Adelaide	Australia	SANFL	South Adelaide is the 2nd oldest football club in South Australia.
1876	Bangor City	Association Football	Association Football	Bangor	Wales	League of Wales	
1876	Albury Tigers	Australian football	Australian football	Albury	Australia	Ovens & Murray Football League	
1876	Warrington Wolves	Rugby football	Rugby league	Warrington	England	Super League	
1876	Chirk AAA	Association Football	Association Football	Wrexham	Wales	Welsh National League (Wrexham Area)	Formed in 1876 as Chirk FC. Welsh Cup winners on 5 occasions.
1876	Westmount	Rugby football	Rugby union	Montreal	Canada	2nd Division of Quebec Rugby Federation	Oldest active rugby club (excluding university teams) in North America. Founded as Montreal Football Club.
1876	Port Vale	Association Football	Association Football	Burslem	England	EFL League One	The club claim to have been founded in 1876, though contemporary research suggests the club was probably founded in 1879.
1876	Falkirk	Association football	Association football	Falkirk	Scotland	Scottish Premiership	
1876	Stafford Rangers	Association football	Association football	Stafford	England	EVO-STIK Premier, England	
1876	Middlesbrough	Association football	Association football	Middlesbrough	England	EFL Championship	
1876	Partick Thistle	Association football	Association football	Glasgow	Scotland	Scottish Championship	
1876	Kjøbenhavns Boldklub	Danish longball	Association football	Copenhagen	Denmark	Danish Superliga	Formed in 1876, but association football was only added in 1878. The club itself claims to be the oldest football club in continental Europe. In 1991, Kjøbenhavns Boldklub and B 1903 merged their professional football teams and formed F.C. Copenhagen.
1876	Tynedale	Rugby football	Rugby union	Corbridge	England	National League 1	
1876	Keighley Cougars	Rugby football	Rugby league	Keighley	England	League 1	
1876	Oldham	Rugby football	Rugby league	Oldham	England	RFL Championship	
1877	Nottingham R.F.C.	Rugby Football	Rugby union	Nottingham	England	RFU Championship	The club was established circa 1877 by Alexander Birkin after returning from Rugby School, where he was introduced to the sport.
1877	Newcastle Falcons	Rugby Football	Rugby union	Newcastle upon Tyne	England	Premiership Rugby	The club was established in 1877 as the Gosforth Football Club.
1877	Clyde	Association football	Association football	Glasgow	Scotland	Scottish League Two	Moved to Hamilton
1877	Melrose RFC	Rugby Football	Rugby union	Melrose	Scotland	Scottish Premiership	
1877	Crewe Alexandra	Association football	Association football	Crewe	England	EFL League One	
1877	St Mirren	Association football	Association football	Paisley	Scotland	Scottish Premiership	
1877	Wolverhampton Wanderers	Association football	Association football	Wolverhampton	England	Premier League	Formed as St. Lukes, before merging with The Wanderers two years later. Founding member of the Football League.
1877	Western Bulldogs	Australian football	Australian football	Footscray	Australia	AFL	Founded as "Footscray Football Club".
1878	London Scottish F.C.	Rugby Football	Rugby union	Richmond	England	RFU Championship	In early 1878, three Scottish members of a team called St. Andrew's Rovers FC decided to break away to form their own club for Scots.
1878	Camborne RFC	Rugby Football	Rugby union	Cornwall	England	South West Premier	
1878	Bridgend Ravens	Rugby football	Rugby union	Bridgend	Wales	Super Rygbi Cymru	
1878	Llandovery RFC	Rugby football	Rugby union	Llandovery	Wales	Super Rygbi Cymru	
1878	Coggeshall Town F.C.	Association football	Association football	Coggeshall	England	Isthmian League	The second oldest club in Essex, founded on 27 September 1878
1878	Norwood Football Club	Australian football	Australian football	Adelaide	Australia	SANFL	One of the oldest football clubs in South Australia
1878	West Bromwich Albion	Association football	Association football	West Bromwich	England	EFL Championship	Founded as West Bromwich Strollers, before adopting the Albion suffix two years later. Founding member of the Football League.
1878	Everton	Association football	Association football	Liverpool	England	Premier League	Also a founding member of the Football League. The club played cricket for two years before adopting association football, so could be said to have been formed in 1876 as a sports club.
1878	Grimsby Town	Association football	Association football	Cleethorpes	England	League Two	Founding member of the Football Alliance. The club joined the Football League as part of the merger between the two leagues in 1892. The club was formed as Grimsby Pelham but changed its name to Grimsby Town in 1878.
1878	Manchester United	Association football	Association football	Manchester	England	Premier League	Founded as Newton Heath LYR Football Club in 1878, the club changed its name to Manchester United in 1902 then moved to Old Trafford in 1910.
1878	Kirkintilloch Rob Roy	Association football	Association football	Kirkintilloch	Scotland	West of Scotland League Premier Division	
1878	Lugar Boswell Thistle	Association football	Association football	Lugar	Scotland	West of Scotland League Third Division	Founded as Lugar Boswell and played until 1939 and reformed 1945 as Lugar Boswell Thistle.
1878	Leigh Centurions	Rugby football	Rugby league	Leigh	England	RFL Championship	
1879	Melton	Australian football	Australian football	Melton	Australia	Ballarat Football League	
1879	Fulham	Association football	Association football	London	England	Premier League	
1879	Rosslyn Park F.C.	Rugby football	Rugby union	London	England	National League 1	
1879	Brora Rangers	Association football	Association football	Brora	Scotland	Highland League	
1879	Sunderland	Association football	Association football	Sunderland	England	EFL Championship	
1879	Koninklijke HFC	Rugby football	Association football	Haarlem	Netherlands	Tweede Divisie	Oldest Dutch club
1879	Montrose	Association football	Association football	Montrose	Scotland	Scottish League Two	
1879	Doncaster Rovers	Association football	Association football	Doncaster	England	EFL League Two	
1879	Swindon Town F.C.	Association football	Association football	Swindon	England	EFL League Two	Founded as Swindon AFC in 1879, they became Spartans in 1880 and Swindon Town in 1883.
1879, 20 September	Cliftonville	Association football	Association football	Belfast	Northern Ireland	NIFL Premiership	Oldest association football club in Ireland.
1879, 19 April	St. Gallen	Association football	Association football	St. Gallen	Switzerland	Swiss Super League	
1879	Jersey Reds	Rugby Football	Rugby union	Saint Peter, Jersey	(United Kingdom) Channel Islands	RFU Championship	Rugby has been played in Jersey since 1879 with breaks for war and the five years of Nazi occupation (1940–45).
1879	Leinster Rugby	Rugby Football	Rugby union	Dublin	(Republic of Ireland) Ireland	United Rugby Championship	The Leinster Branch was inaugurated at a meeting on 31 October 1879.
1879	Munster Rugby	Rugby Football	Rugby union	Limerick and Cork	(Republic of Ireland) Ireland	United Rugby Championship	Munster was officially founded in 1879, at the same time as Leinster and Ulster.
1879	Ulster Rugby	Rugby Football	Rugby union	Belfast	(Republic of Ireland) Ireland	United Rugby Championship	
1879	Canterbury	Rugby union	Rugby union	Christchurch	New Zealand	Bunnings NPC	Oldest provincial rugby team in New Zealand.
1879	Sunbury	Australian football	Australian football	Sunbury	Australia	Ballarat Football League	
1879	Harlow Town F.C.	Association football	Association football	Harlow	England	Spartan South Midlands Football League	

=== 1880–1889 ===
Date	Club	Original code	Current codes	City/Suburb	Country	Status	Notes
1880, 3 Aug	Leicester Tigers	Rugby Football	Rugby union	Leicester	England	Premiership Rugby	Leicester Football Club was formed on 3 August 1880 by the merger of three smaller teams: Leicester Athletic Society, Leicester Amateurs, and Leicester Alert.
1880, 11 Nov	Gimnasia y Esgrima (BA)	Association football	Association football	Buenos Aires	Argentina	URBA Primera C	Like the homonymous club from La Plata, Gimnasia y Esgrima was established as a gymnastics and fencing institution, then adding other sports. After GyE disaffiliated from AFA in the later 1910s, association football has remanined but only at amateur level. Rugby union would emerge as the predominant "football" code, competing in URBA leagues up to present
1880	SC 1880 Frankfurt	Rugby football	Rugby union	Frankfurt	Germany	Rugby-Bundesliga	
1880	Northampton Saints	Rugby Football	Rugby Union	Northampton	England	Gallagher Premiership	Northampton R.F.C was founded by the clergy of St.James' Church in 1880. The Club have been Champions of England, Second Tier Champions, and Champions of Europe in recent times
1880	Preston North End	Association football	Association football	Preston	England	EFL Championship	Preston North End was a founder member of the Football League in 1888. In the 1888–89 season, the team won both the inaugural league championship and the FA Cup, the latter without conceding a goal. They were the first team to achieve the "Double" in English football and, as they were unbeaten in all matches, are remembered as "The Invincibles".
1880	East Craigie	Association football	Association football	Dundee	Scotland	Midlands Premier League	The Scottish Junior Football Association was founded in 1886. East Craigie pre-date this and are one of the oldest Junior (i.e., non-SFA) clubs still in existence.
1880	Antwerp	Association football	Association football	Antwerp	Belgium	Belgian Pro League	Antwerp was founded in 1880 by English students as Antwerp Athletic Club. A football division named Antwerp Football Club was formed in 1887. It was the first club to register to the Belgian Football Association in 1895 and they later received the matriculate number one.
1880	Beccles Suffolk	Association Football	Association Football	Beccles	England	Anglian Combination	Formed in 1880 by employees of The Caxton Print Beccles. Currently playing in the Anglian Combination and were from its conception in 1977.
1880	Manchester City	Association football	Association football	Manchester	England	Premier League	Formed in 1880 as St. Marks Gorton. Became Ardwick A.F.C in 1887 and Manchester City in 1894
1881	Kiveton Park	Association football	Association football	Sheffield	England	Sheffield & Hallamshire County Senior League Premier Division	
1881	Eastbourne Town	Association football	Association football	Eastbourne	England	Isthmian League South East Division	Formed in 1881 as Devonshire Park, they played at the venue of the same name which is now the home of the Eastbourne International tennis tournament. Moved to their current ground of the Saffrons in 1886. Became Eastbourne F.C. in 1889 and Eastbourne Town F.C. in 1971.
1881	Berwick Rangers	Association football	Association football	Berwick upon Tweed	England	Lowland League	English club that plays in Scottish system.
1881	Watford Rovers	Association football	Association football	Watford	England	EFL Championship	One of the oldest clubs to never have won a major trophy.
1882, 17 April	Córdoba A.C.	Association football	Rugby union	Córdoba	Argentina	Top 10 Córdoba	The first football club in Córdoba Province. Rugby was added in 1898, becoming the main sports when the club left football in 1931.
1882	New South Wales Waratahs	Rugby football	Rugby union	Sydney	Australia	Super Rugby	
1882	Queensland Reds	Rugby football	Rugby union	Brisbane	Australia	Super Rugby	
1882, 18 May	Burnley	Association football	Association football	Burnley	England	EFL Championship	Founder member of the Football League in 1888.
1882, October	Albion Rovers	Association football	Association football	Coatbridge	Scotland	Lowland League West	First players drawn from two local Junior teams ' The Albion' and 'The Rovers'.
1882	QPR	Association football	Association football	White City	England	EFL Championship	
1882	Tottenham Hotspur	Association football	Association football	Tottenham	England	Premier League	
1882	Burgess Hill Town	Association football	Association football	Burgess Hill	England	Isthmian League Premier Division	
1882	North Ballarat	Australian football	Australian football	Ballarat	Australia	Ballarat Football League	
1882	Hull Kingston Rovers	Rugby football	Rugby league	Kingston upon Hull	England	Super League	
1882	Roman Glass St. George	Association football	Association football	Bristol	England	Western League	Oldest continuous club in Bristol. Originally St. George FC and Bristol St. George.
1883	Stade Français	Rugby football	Rugby union	Paris	France	Top 14	
1883, 5 March	Gloucester City	Association football	Association football	Gloucester	England	National League North	
1883	Balgownie Rangers	Association football	Association football	Balgownie	Australia	Illawarra District League	Oldest currently active association football club in Australia
1883	Bristol Rovers	Association football	Association football	Bristol	England	League One	
1883	Stockport County	Association football	Association football	Stockport	England	National League North	Formed as Heaton Norris Rovers changing name to Stockport County FC in 1890
1883	Darlington	Association football	Association football	Darlington	England	National League North	Known as "Darlington 1883" between 2012 and 2017 due to "Darlington F.C." being temporarily expelled from the FA
1884	Derby County	Association football	Association football	Derby	England	EFL Championship	One of twelve founders of the Football League.
1884	Leicester City	Association football	Association football	Leicester	England	Premier League	Known as Leicester Fosse between 1884 and 1919.
1885, 20 February	Richmond	Australian football	Australian football	Richmond	Australia	Australian Football League	A number of teams formed in the Richmond area during Australian rules football's rapid expansion of the 1870s, and early 1880s. However, all played at a junior level and it was considered an anomaly that Richmond, one of Melbourne's biggest locales, did not boast a senior team. The wait ended when the Richmond Football Club was officially formed on 20 February 1885.
1885, 11 April	Luton Town	Association football	Association football	Luton	England	EFL League One	
1885, 13 May	Aalborg Boldspilklub	Association football	Association football	Aalborg	Denmark	Danish Superliga	
1885	Bury	Association football	Association football	Bury	England	North West Counties League Premier Division	Expelled from the EFL in 2019, merging with phoenix club Bury A.F.C. ahead of the 2023–24 season.
1885	Forfar Athletic	Association football	Association football	Forfar	Scotland	Scottish League Two	
1885	Southampton	Association football	Association football	Southampton	England	EFL Championship	Formed as St. Mary's Y.M.A..
1886, 1 September	Grasshopper Club Zürich	Association football	Association football	Zürich	Switzerland	Credit Suisse Super League	Founded by a group of English students led by Tom E. Griffith. The club remains the most successful club in terms of trophies in Swiss football history.
1886	Glossop	Association football	Association football	Glossop	England	North West Counties League Premier Division	Glossop is one of the smallest towns in England to have had a Football League club, and it remains the smallest town whose team has played in the English top flight.
1886	Linfield	Association football	Association football	Belfast	Northern Ireland	NIFL Premiership	
1886	Plymouth	Association football	Association football	Plymouth	England	EFL League One	
1886	Motherwell	Association football	Association football	Motherwell	Scotland	Scottish Premiership	
1886	Arsenal	Association football	Association football	South London	England	Premier League	
1886	North Shore United	Association football	Association football	Auckland	New Zealand	Lotto Sport Italia NRFL Division 1	Founded as North Shore, the club is reputedly the oldest extant association football club in Oceania.
1886	Myrtleford Alpine Saints	Australian football	Australian football	Myrtleford	Australia	Ovens & Murray Football League	
1887	Académica de Coimbra		Association football	Coimbra	Portugal	Segunda Liga	The oldest club currently playing football in the Iberian Peninsula. The club only started playing football in 1912.
1887	Barnsley	Association football	Association football	Barnsley	England	EFL League One	Initially formed under the name "Barnsley St. Peters" but dropped "St. Peters" to become simply Barnsley in 1897.
1887	Wallsend	Association football	Association football	Wallsend	Australia	Northern NSW State League Division 1	
1887	USV Hercules	Association football	Association football	Utrecht (stad)	Netherlands	Derde Divisie	
1887, 3 June	Gimnasia y Esgrima (LP)	Association football	Association football	La Plata	Argentina	Primera División	The first sports offered were, as its Spanish name indicates, gymnastics and fencing. Association football and other sports were added later.
1887, 12 July	Odense boldklub	Association football	Association football	Odense	Denmark	Danish Superliga	
1887, 7 November	Celtic	Association football	Association football	Glasgow	Scotland	Scottish Premiership	Founded in 1887 but played its first game against rivals Rangers in May 1888, winning 5–2.
1887, 27 November	Quilmes	Association football	Association football	Quilmes	Argentina	Primera B Nacional	The club claims to be established on 5 November 1887, although some local historians stated that the original "Quilmes" club founded that year was later dissolved and the "Quilmes Cricket Club" was in fact a completely new institution, not related with other clubs previously founded in the city of Quilmes.
1887, 4 December	Örgryte IS	Association football	Association football	Gothenburg	Sweden	Superettan	
1888	Bristol Bears	Rugby Football	Rugby union	Bristol	England	Premiership Rugby	Bristol Football Club was formed in 1888 when the Carlton club merged with rival club Redland Park to create a united Bristol team.
1888, 13 May	São Paulo A.C.	Rugby football/Association football	Rugby union	São Paulo	Brazil	Brazilian Rugby Championship	First Brazilian football association and rugby union team.
1888	Northern	Association football	Association football	Dunedin	New Zealand	Southern League	Founded under its current name. Briefly renamed as Dunedin North End (1972–74) and North End United (1974–90).
1888	Roslyn-Wakari	Association football	Association football	Dunedin	New Zealand	Southern Premier League	Founded as Wakari AFC. Name changed to Roslyn AFC in 1890. Team split into Roslyn AFC and Wakari AFC in 1895 before re-amalgamating under its current name in 1904.
1889, 26 February	Akademisk Boldklub	Association football	Association football	Gladsaxe	Denmark	Danish 2nd Division	Founded through a merger between Fredericia Studenternes Kricketklub and Polyteknisk Boldklub.
1889, 22 March	Sheffield United	Association football	Association football	Sheffield	England	Premier League	The oldest football team called United.
1889, 12 July	Adamstown Rosebud	Association football	Association football	Adamstown	Australia	National Premier Leagues	
1889, 19 July	Bath City FC	Association football	Association football	Bath	England	National League South	Founded in 1889 as Bath AFC, and changed names to Bath City in 1905.
1889, 15 August	Mohun Bagan	Association football	Association football	Kolkata	India	Indian Super League	Founded as Mohun Bagan Sporting Club in 1889, it competes in the Indian Super League. It has been dubbed as the "National Club of India" and has the distinction of being one of the oldest existing football clubs in Asia. The club is most notable for its victory over the East Yorkshire Regiment in the 1911 IFA Shield final. In 2020, this historic club merged with ATK to form ATK Mohun Bagan. In 2023, the club was rebranded as Mohun Bagan Super Giant after continuous protest from the fans.
1889, 23 December	Recreativo de Huelva	Association football	Association football	Huelva	Spain	Segunda División	The oldest football club in Spain.
1889, 24 December	Rosario Central	Association football	Association football	Rosario	Argentina	Primera División	The peculiarity is that this club was explicitly founded for the practice of football, unlike other Argentine clubs of the 1880s that incorporated it later.

== See also ==
- List of oldest football competitions
- Club of Pioneers

== Sources ==
- 1824: The World's First Foot-Ball Club, John Hutchinson and Andy Mitchell. Andy Mitchell Media, 2018. ISBN 978-1-9866-1244-9.
