= KRFC (disambiguation) =

KRFC is a community-based radio station located in Fort Collins, Colorado, USA.

KRFC may also refer to any of the following sports clubs:

- Kalamazoo Rugby Football Club
- Keadue Rovers F.C.
- Kenilworth RFC
- Kettering Rugby Football Club
- Killymoon Rangers F.C.
- Kilroot Recreation F.C.
- Kilsyth Rangers F.C.
- Kilwinning Rangers F.C.
- King's College Rugby Club
- Kintbury Rangers F.C.
- Kirkcaldy RFC

== See also ==
- KRUFC (disambiguation)
