= Roar News =

King's College London student newspaper

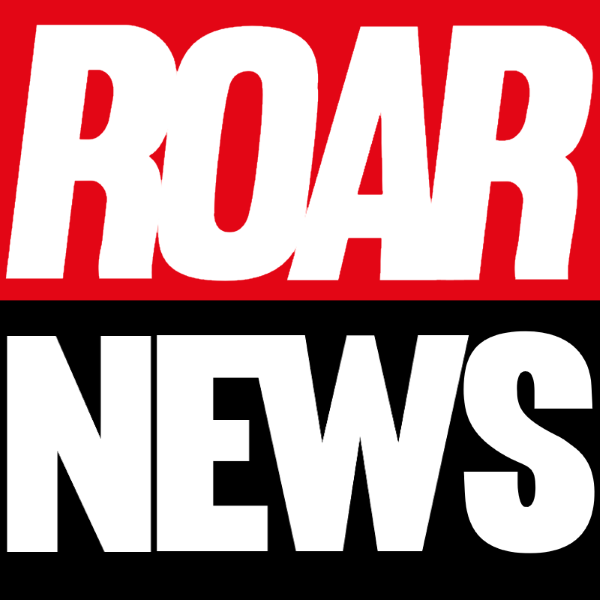
- Type: Quarterly newspaper
- Format: Tabloid
- Owner: King's College London Students' Union
- Publisher: Reach Printing Services
- Founded: 1973
- Political alignment: None
- Headquarters: Bush House South East Wing, King's College London, Strand, London
- Circulation: 4,000
- Website: roarnews.co.uk

Roar News is the student newspaper of King's College London. It is editorially independent of both the university and the students' union. It has existed in various incarnations since 1973, but in 1992 its name was changed from Casey L to Roar News - named after the university's mascot, Reggie the lion. Roar prints four times a year.

Roar has been recognised by the Student Publication Association (SPA). In 2023, they won Best Publication in London and were Highly Commended for Best Publication in the UK.

== History ==
Since its founding in 1973, Roar has existed in various formats, as a magazine, then a tabloid newspaper. It was turned into a full colour, glossy magazine in 2006 but has since been re-branded as a tabloid, borrowing the style of The Sun and The Mirror newspapers in its layout.

== Content and structure ==
Roar operates both in physical print and online, where it publishes multiple times a day during the academic year. The newspaper has five sections: News, Comment, Culture, Science and Sports.

The Sports section covers both student sporting competitions and international tournaments. A key focus of the Sports section is extensive reporting on the annual London Varsity sports fixtures between King's College and University College London (UCL).

In recent years, the newspaper has expanded their multimedia content. Many of their interviews are published in video-format on YouTube and Instagram. They also run Podcasts, "RoarCast" and "Manestream Media", where they host discussions with King's College London alumni (including Members of Parliament), student societies and university staff.

== Notable stories and campaigns ==
- Health Schools job cuts (May 2014): Roar came out against university plans to cut 120 jobs in Health Schools in a letter accusing the college of lacking transparency and racing through the redundancy process too quickly.
- London Living Wage (Feb 2014 - March 2014): As part of the campaign, Roar ran an interview with two anonymous King's cleaners who couldn't afford to feed their children on the front page of their February edition.
- Lord Carey 'homophobic' comments (Nov 2012–Feb 2015): Roar campaigned for the removal of King's alumnus Lord Carey from the Strand Campus windows for controversial comments in opposition to same sex marriage at a Conservative Party conference fringe event in 2012.
- Mental health awareness (Nov 2013): Roar produced a special print edition on mental health in November 2013, aiming to raise awareness of mental health among King's students. It included articles such as 'We need racially diverse counsellors' and an interview with King's alumnus Rory Bremner on his ADHD.
- Charles Amos Controversy (May 2020): After Charles Amos was elected President of the King's College London Conservative Association, Roar interviewed Mr. Amos, exploring his deeply controversial views on the NHS, race, gender and LGBT rights His past comments on these issues would also lead to his swift removal as the society's President, an event also covered by Roar.
- Post-Covid University & College Union Strikes (October 2021 – present). Roar covered the impact of lecturer strikes on students and interviewed key players within the unions as well as the university administration.
- Drink spiking at KCLSU venues (February 2022 – present). After multiple incidences of drink spiking at student bars across King's College campuses, Roar interviewed members of the 'Stop the Music' campaign who had negotiated with the university and student union for improved safety protocols.

== Awards ==
- 2014: Roar won Best Website at the 2014 SPA Awards and received "Special Recognition" for Best Publication. The editorial team won the Anna Sargent Student Journalist Award at the Mind Media Awards for outstanding mental health reporting in November 2014.
- 2015: Roar picked up six awards at the SPA National Conference. The paper won Best Publication, Best Website, Best Design and Best Entertainment Piece. It received a highly commended for Best News Story and Best Feature. Roar also won The Guardian's "newspaper of the year" award.
- 2022: Roar was Highly Commended for the Best Publication award at the SPA's 2022 National Awards. Then-Editor-in-Chief Marino Unger-Verna was also awarded Best Interview for 'The Personal Toll of India's Pandemic'.
- 2023' At the SPA's London Regional Awards, Roar was awarded Best Publication. Staff Writer Matteo Cardarelli was awarded Best Journalist and then Editor-in-Chief Ishaan Rahman was given a special mention for Outstanding Commitment. Then Head of Tech Jack Curtis was awarded Highly Commended for Outstanding Commitment; this followed a major redesign of Roar's website in late 2022. At the SPA's subsequent national conference, Roar was runner-up for Best Student Publication in the UK.
