= Club Mercedes =

Association football club in Argentina

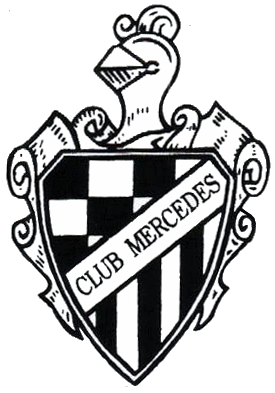
- Full name: Club Mercedes
- Nickname: Blanquinegros
- Founded: 12 May 1875; 150 years ago
- Ground: Estadio Liga Mercedina, Mercedes, Buenos Aires
- Capacity: 5,000
- President: Guido Pisoni
- Coach: Walter Díaz
- League: Primera C
- 2025: 9th. of Zona A
| colours | colours |

Club Mercedes is an Argentine sports club located in the city of Mercedes in Buenos Aires Province. Having been established in 1875, the club is regarded as the oldest association football club still in existence in Argentina.

The football team plays in Primera C, the fourth division of the Argentine football league system. Until then, it had played in Torneo Federal C, a now defunct regionalized 5th. division, where Mercedes participated in the 2017 season.

At regional level, Mercedes also played in the "Liga Mercedina", the league where clubs from Mercedes and other cities around (such as San Antonio de Areco, Luján or Zárate among others) participate.

Apart from football, other sports practiced at the club are basketball, roller skating, swimming, and tennis.

== History ==
Club Mercedes was founded by Dr. Manuel Lanchenhein under the name "Club Social". It was the institution chosen by the traditional families of Mercedes, who used to attend the conferences, banquets and dances held by the club.

In 1935, the Club Social merged with Club Deportivo Mercedes, forming current "Club Mercedes" The establishment of the new club brought sports activities, with association football as the most prominent of them.

In the 1980s, Mercedes merged with Club del Progreso to form "Club Mercedes del Progreso". During those times, the club won its first titles. Some years later, the club returned to its original name.

The football team is the most winning of Liga Mercedina, with 19 championships won. The club has also played the Torneo Argentino C and Torneo Argentino B several times. In 2012, Mercedes debuted in Copa Argentina but the team was eliminated in the first stage.

In 2016 Mercedes debuted in the Torneo Federal C, the regionalised 5th level of Argentine football system (and lowest division) that had a total of 266 teams that season. Mercedes placed 4th of 4 in the Zona 22 being eliminated in the first round.

In April 2022, it was announced that Mercedes's request for affiliation to the Argentine Football Association (AFA) had been accepted therefore the team will play in Primera D Metropolitana since the 2022 season. The last club to be affiliated to AFA prior to Mercedes had been Real Pilar in 2017. It was announced that only under-23 players would be allowed to play for the senior squad.

== Titles ==
=== Regional ===
- Liga Mercedina (18): 1981, 1984, 1985, 1986, 1987, 1988, 1989, 1990, 1991, 1992, 1993, 1996, 1997, 2000 2001, 2002, 2004, 2005
- Torneo Provincial (1): 1993
