= Ayoola Erinle =

England international rugby union player

- Born: Ayoola Erinle; 20 February 1980 (age 46) Lagos, Nigeria
- Height: 6 ft 4 in (1.92 m)
- Weight: 16 st (102 kg)
- School: The Oratory School
- University: King's College London; Loughborough University

Rugby union career
- Position: Centre
- Current team: US Carcassonne
Amateur team(s)
| Years | Team | Apps | (Points) |
| 2002 ‐ 2007 | King's College Rugby Club | | |
| 2007 ‐ 2009 | Henley Hawks | | |
| – | Reading RFC | | |
| – | Loughborough Students RUFC | | |
Senior career
| Years | Team | Apps | (Points) |
| 2000–2007 | London Wasps | 106 | (130) |
| 2007–2009 | Leicester Tigers | 23 | (25) |
| 2009–2011 | Biarritz Olympique | 21 | (5) |
| 2011–2012 | Nottingham | 22 | (30) |
| 2012– | US Carcassonne | 9 | (20) |
- Correct as of 5 December 2012
International career
| Years | Team | Apps | (Points) |
| 2009 | England | 2 | (0) |
National sevens team
| Years | Team | | Comps |
- England Sevens

Ayoola Erinle (born 20 February 1980 in Lagos, Nigeria) is known for being an England international rugby union player. He was educated at The Oratory School and at King's College London, representing both his school's 1st XV and the King's College Rugby Club's 1st XV. He played professional rugby for clubs such as Wasps RFC, Leicester Tigers and Biarritz Olympique, and later worked his way through the ranks to represent England in 2009. In 2013, upon retirement, Erinle returned to education, studying Engineering Physics at Loughborough University where he achieved a First Class master's degree.

== Career ==
A runner, Erinle was one of the biggest centres in the Premiership. He was a member of the England Saxons side that won the 2007 Churchill Cup, having already represented his country at that level in 2005 and 2006, as well as on the England Sevens on the rugby sevens circuit aged just 19. He gained Sevens honours again in 2008 and was a close challenger for the Premiership top try scorer three years earlier in the 2003-04 Zurich Premiership.

Before joining London Wasps in 2000, Erinle played for local team Reading RFC.

Erinle spent seven years at Wasps and his finishing power brought eleven tries in nineteen appearances for Wasps during the 2004–05 season, while his final total reads 26 tries in 106 games for the club. He helped Wasps win a hat-trick of Premiership titles in 2003, 2004 and 2005, playing in all three finals (2003 and 2004 as a replacement and starting in 2005). He was also a replacement when Wasps won the 2004 Heineken Cup Final.

In 2007, Erinle joined the Leicester Tigers. At the end of his first season at Leicester he faced his former team Wasps in the Premiership final, and Wasps emerged triumphant denying Erinle a fourth title. However the following season Leicester got to the final again and this time defeated London Irish. Erinle started the final.

In 2009 it was announced the Erinle had signed with French team Biarritz Olympique.

On 4 November 2009, he was named in the 22-man England squad to face Australia in the 2009 Autumn internationals. After winning his first cap as a replacement against Australia, Erinle was named in the starting XV for the game against the All Blacks.

In August 2011 he joined Nottingham in the Aviva Championship, joining up with Director of Rugby Glenn Delaney for a second spell.

In August 2012 he joined US Carcassonne in the Pro D2.

== Personal life ==
During his time at Leicester, Erinle and teammates George Chuter, Dan Hipkiss and Sam Vesty, performed as a band to raise money for the Matt Hampson Trust. In this band (named "Slo Progress") Erinle was the drummer.

In October 2003, Erinle appeared three times as a contestant on British game show Countdown.
