= KRUFC =

KRUFC may refer to:

- Keighley RUFC
- Kendal Rugby Union Football Club
- Keyworth Rugby Union Football Club

== See also ==
- KRFC (disambiguation)
