= The Gymnastic Society =

UK association football club

The Gymnastic Society was an eighteenth-century London sports club for the pursuit of football and wrestling. It is arguably the first football club.

== Background ==
The club was established in London by gentlemen from Westmorland and Cumberland in the north of England for the "practice and cultivation of their favourite sports".

== Football ==
Regular football games were played at the Kennington common on the south side of the river Thames, in what was formerly Surrey and close to The Oval where a century later the first international football match was to take place. Here "matches for small and large sums were played in the course of each year". The last of the frequent matches took place in the summer of 1789 when "twenty two gentlemen of Westmoreland were backed against twenty two gentlemen of Cumberland for one thousand guineas" These matches have been described in a modern publication as "the most important centre of footballing activity" in the eighteenth century, outside the English public school football games.

One of the last football matches took place on 4 April 1796 at the Kennington common, although some games continued until about 1800.

The popularity of football is attested to in the 1826 inaugural meeting of a later organisation (entitled "The London Gymnastic Society") its chairman stated that twenty years earlier "the fields to the north, south and west would be crowded every afternoon with cricket and football"

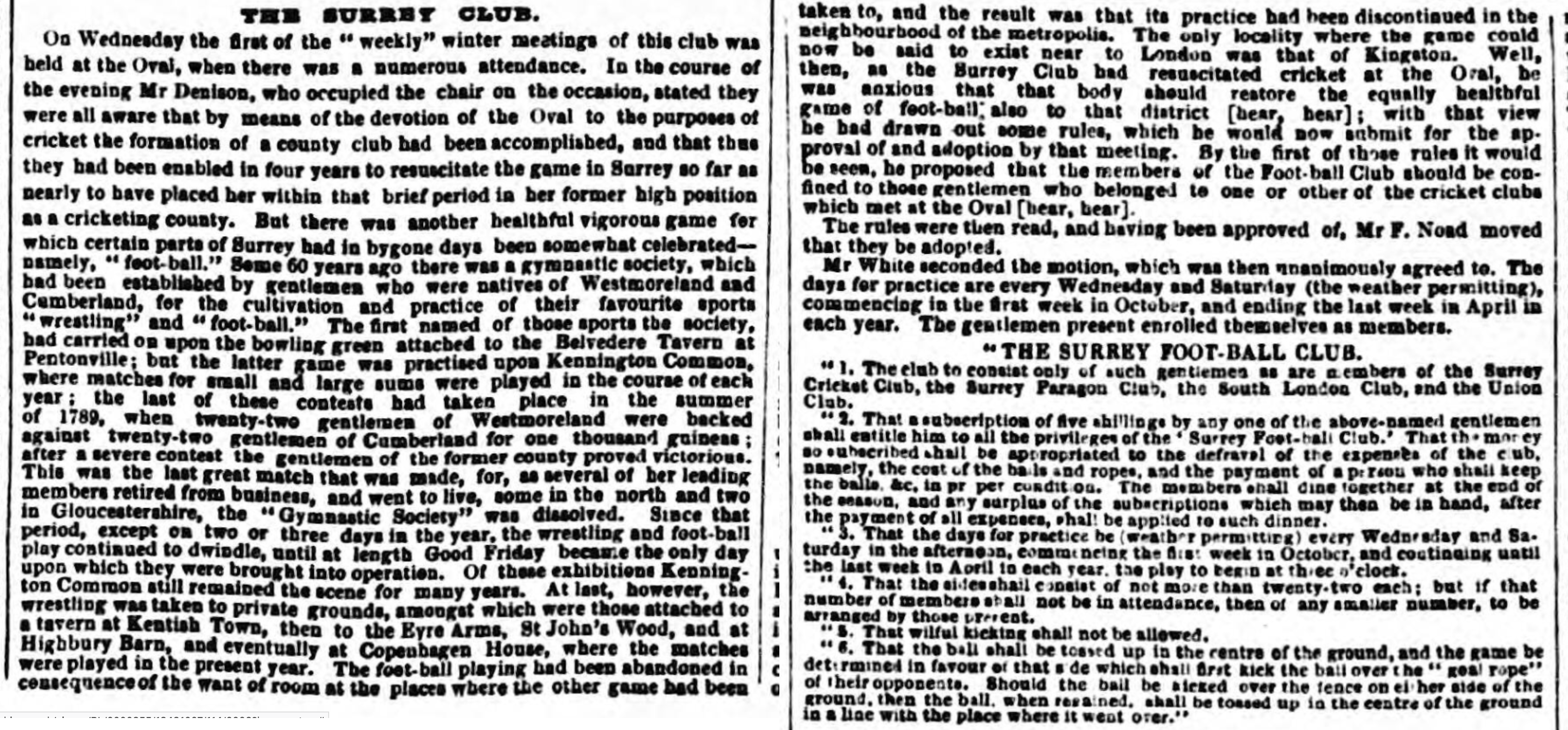

It is possible that the rules of the Surrey Football Club (1849) were based upon those of the original Gymnastic Society, as the founder William Denison referred to the Society in his speech and both clubs played with twenty-two players a side.

The term "Gymnastic Society" has been used to describe a significant number of English sporting bodies, in the way that the term "sports club" or "football club" is used today. For example, Manchester Athenaeum's 1849 "Gymnastic Society" played regular Saturday afternoon football matches.

== Wrestling ==
Wrestling took place in the bowling green attached to the Belvedere tavern at Pentonville.
