= King's College London RFC =

King's College London Rugby Football Club
- Full name: King's College London Rugby Football Club
- Union: RFU
- Founded: 1869
- Region: London, England
- Ground: New Malden Sports Ground (Berrylands)
- President: (United Kingdom) Henry Collins
- Captain(s): (United Kingdom) Sulaymaan Samir & Liam Record
1st XV kit	2nd XV kit

The King's College London Rugby Football Club (also referred to as KCLRFC and King's Rugby) is an English rugby union club based in London.

The club represents King's College London in competitions organised by the British Universities and Colleges Sport. The team plays its home games at the New Malden Sports Ground in Berrylands.

== Background ==
KCLRFC runs two competitive sides each entered into the BUCS leagues. The 1st XV compete in the second tier of the South East Region. The 2nd XV upholds a competitive nature in the fourth tier of the South East region. Both teams used to enter the University of London Union (ULU) cup competitions before the ULU was dissolved: the 1st XV competed for the Gutteridge Cup which was open to all University of London 1st XVs (including Imperial College who affiliated to ULU despite the college leaving the federal university in 2007); the 2nd XV competed in the Reserves Plate – open to all 2nd and lower XVs.

The London Varsity is an annual match against their rivals UCL played in March, and has recently been played at the Barnet Copthall stadium, the home of Premiership Rugby side Saracens F.C.. It is considered one of the highlights of the University of London's sporting calendar and takes place in front of a crowd of several thousand supporters from both colleges. The winner takes home the George-Bentham Cup, named after King George IV and Jeremy Bentham, associated with the founding of King's College and University College respectively. The club caters for all standards of players, with players new to the game welcome.

At the end of each season an annual general meeting is held where club members vote for a new committee who will be responsible for the club the following season. Former head coach John Graves (previously Backs coach for Esher RFC) started coaching at the club from midseason 2007/08. He coached the 1st XV team to progress up two leagues, won the Gutteridge Cup and won the varsity match three times. Currently in the 2026/27 season the team is coached by head coach Andrew Lane and assistant coach Teddy Varbanov.

== Club colours ==
The 1st XV play in red and navy shirts, navy shorts and red and blue socks. The emblem on the shirts is the university crest and features Reggie the Lion. Below the crest is the club motto which reads 'Sancte et Sapienter' (With Holiness and Wisdom).

== Representative honors ==
Position	Name	Current Club	Former club(s)	International	Caps
Centre	Ayoola Erinle	retired	Biarritz Olympique, Leicester Tigers, London Wasps, Henley Hawks	England	2 (2009)

== Statistics ==
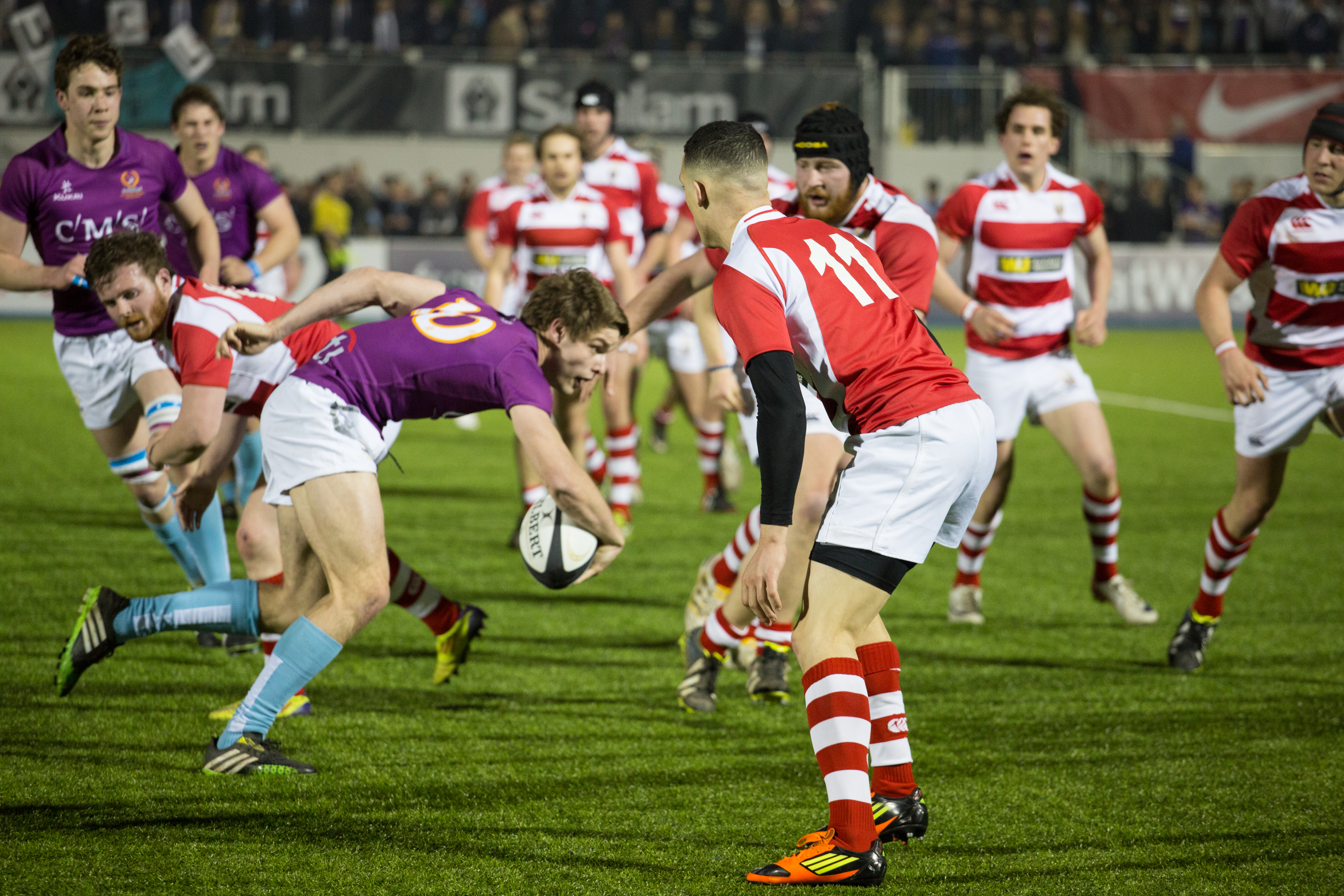
KCLRFC taking on UCL in the London Varsity Series 2014

Year	BUCS League	Gutteridge Cup	Varsity
2006/07	6th 2B	Runner-up	Lost
2007/08	6th 2B	Q/Final	Lost
2008/09	Winner 3B	Winner	Won
2009/10	6th 2B	Runner-up	Lost
2010/11	Winner 2B	S/Final	Won
2011/12	8th 1A	S/Final	Lost
2012/13	3rd 2B	–	Won
2013/14	4th 2B	–	Lost
2014/15	Winner 1A	–	Won
2015/16	4th Prem B	–	Won
2016/17	8th South A	–	Won
2017/18	6th South B	–	Lost
2018/19	6th 1A	–	Lost
2019/20	3rd 2B	–	Won
2020/21	-	–	Lost
2021/22	2nd 2B	–	Lost
2022/23	2nd 2B	–	Lost
2023/24	5th 2B	-	Lost
2024/25	4th 2A	-	Lost
2025/26	3rd 2A	-	Lost

== President/Captain/Treasurer ==
Year	President	Captain	Treasurer
2006/07	Dane Alexander	Tim Hutt	Ali Macgregor
2007/08	Ali Macgregor	Will Northover	Ben Evans
2008/09	Mark Hodson	Nicholas Horsthuis	Tom Wein
2009/10	Ian Adams	Jake Janes	Ali Goodbrand
2010/11	Tom Wall	James Duffus	Dave Lyons
2011/12	Duncan Castle	Simon Edwards	Joe Calnan
2012/13	Jake Seeds	Stefan Cook	Joe Calnan
2013/14	Robin Cumming	Tim Fawcett	Alex Currie
2014/15	Dave Green	Barney Lynock	Graham Harding
2015/16	William Brown	George Taylor	Kieran Brocken
2016/17	Blaise Salle	Matthew Radley	Finbar Tilford
2017/18	Josh Jones	Sam Ridgway	Luqman Swift
2018/19	Aidan Freedman	Harry Robb	Yazad Sethna
2019/20	Henry Thomas	Sam Grasby	Jih Shenn Foo
2020/21	Tom Smaldon	Jono Slee	James Houghton
2021/22	Yazan Issa	Joshua Hall	Henry Woodfine
2022/23	Raphael Azria	Jack Costello	Alexander Jonsson
2023/24	Felix Petersen	George Peprah	Tom Simms
2024/25	Oscar Stuart	Benjamin Navabi	Shannon Liew
2025/26	Tom Simms	Steven Coker	Can Kucukcan
2026/27	Henry Collins	Sulaymaan Samir & Liam Record	Hector Nouailhetas

== See also ==
- King's College London
- King's College London Students' Union
