= King's College London Students' Union =

Student activities organisation at King's College London

King's College London Students' Union (KCLSU)
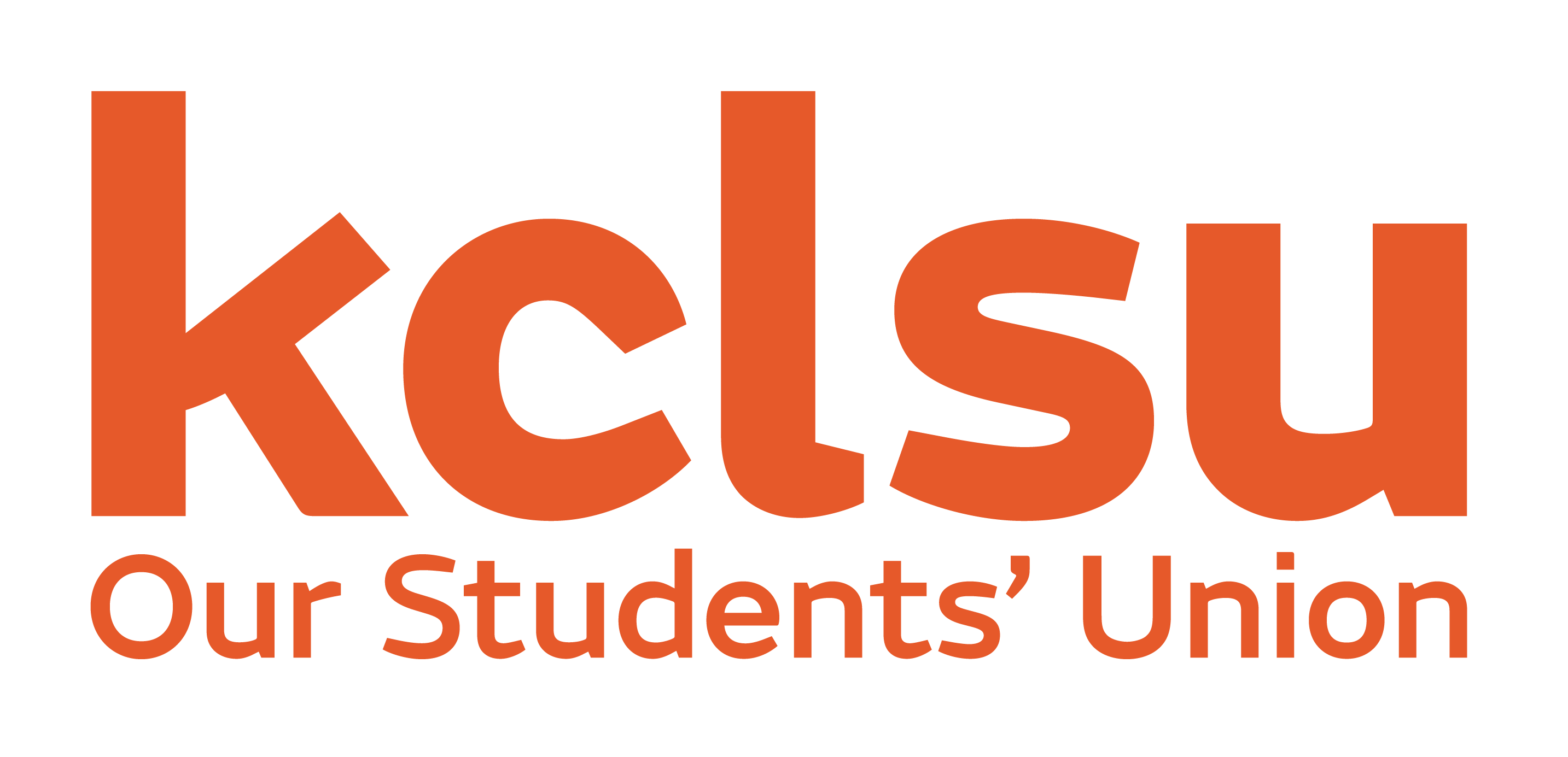
- Institution: King's College London
- Location: London, WC2
- Established: 1878 as the Union Society of King's College, London; 1908 as KCLSU
- President: Luqmaan Waqar
- Chief Executive: Denis Shukur
- Vice presidents: Uthman Ahmad, Zeina Eweiss, Harrison Lee, Hamza Malik and Adithi Sathiyan
- Members: c. 54,000
- Affiliations: National Union of Students; Aldwych Group; National Postgraduate Committee
- Mascot: Reggie the Lion
- Website: www.kclsu.org

King's College London Students' Union (KCLSU) is an independent charitable organisation that works to further the interests of its members (approximately 36,000 students at King's College London). It governs the 300 student societies and activity groups at King's. KCLSU claims to be the oldest students' union in England.

The strategic plan that defines the mission of KCLSU is to create "a place where everyone has the opportunity to thrive".

== History ==
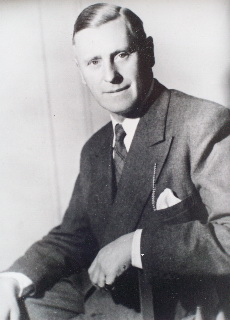
Sir Ivison Macadam, KCLSU president in 1922 and became the founding president of the UK's National Union of Students

KCLSU took over from what was then the Union Society of King's College. The latter had a common room in the Chesham Building on Surrey Street since 1873 but was running into financial difficulties. With the College Council agreeing that every student should support the Union, a sum was collected from the student fees effectively re-establishing the Union in 1905. The new KCLSU eventually took over the organisation of the King's College students' social activities and the athletics club, having been formally established at a general meeting of King's students held on 4 December 1908.

The first president was F. Hanson and for a number of years, it remained an all-male organisation until the arrival of female students in 1915. The most famous president of KCLSU was Sir Ivison Macadam who governed in 1922 and became the first president of the newly merged National Union of Students. An early honour board in the main building dates from 1908 with the name of the first president of the KCLSU.

Following the various mergers and de-mergers of colleges in the University of London with King's, many collegiate students' unions records have either been misplaced or are possibly stored in the King's archives.

== Mascot ==
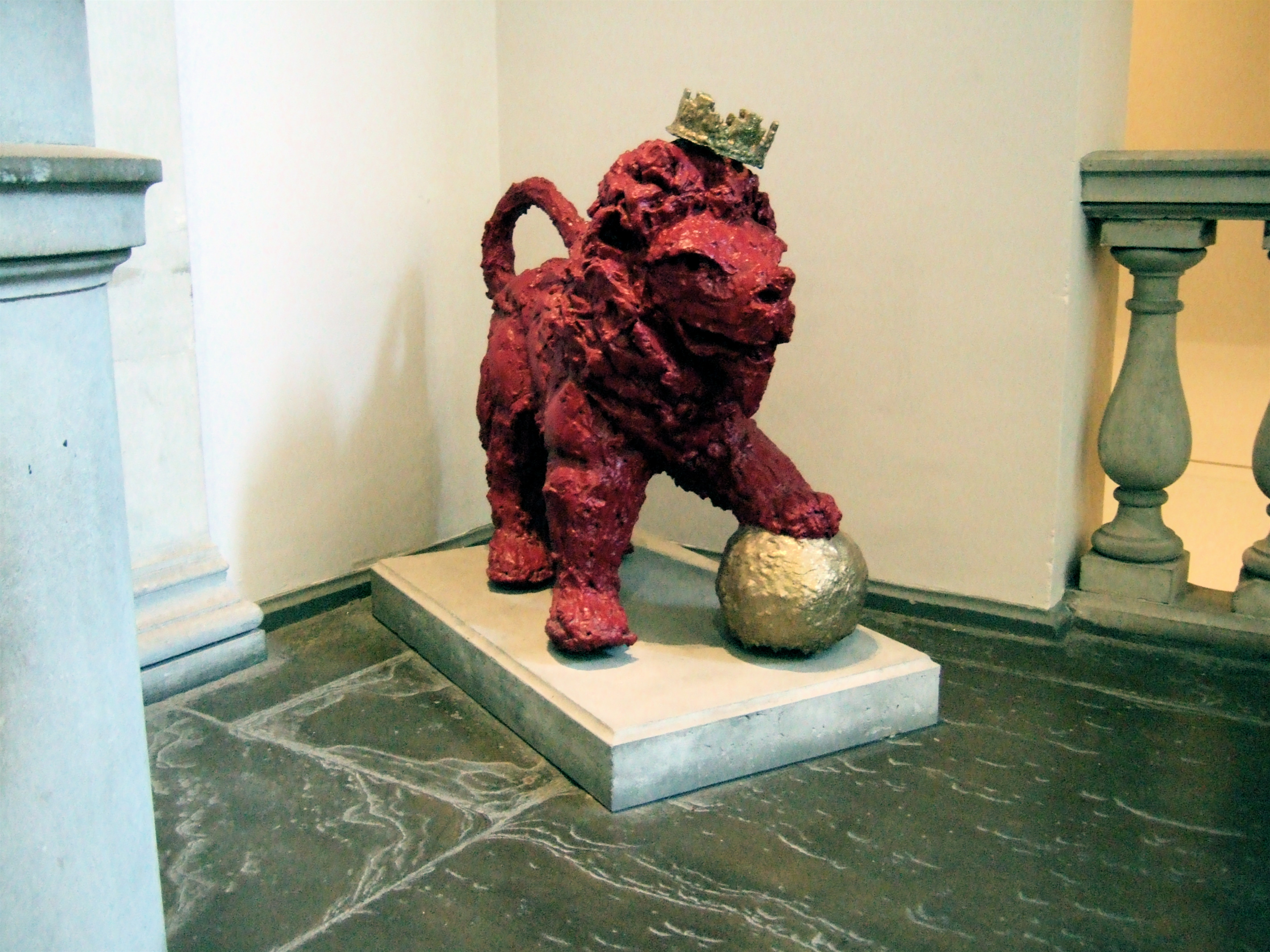
Reggie the Lion

KCLSU's official mascot is Reggie the Lion. In his early years, he would often be paraded on sports grounds by teams to support matches. There are at least four official "Reggies" in existence: the original, on display in KCLSU's Student Centre at the Strand Campus, a papier-mâché Reggie outside the Great Hall at the Strand Campus (pictured), a miniature display Reggie outside Willie's Common Room in the East Wing of Somerset House, and a small sterling silver incarnation displayed during graduation ceremonies.

Being such an easily liftable mascot that was often seen in public, Reggie was an obvious target for marauding students from other institutions. In the 1970s, Reggie was buried upside-down in a pit near Waterloo station, which was filled with concrete; the tip of his tail remained visible. Later, he was lost for many years in the 1990s, and not recovered until he was found in a field. Having been restored at the cost of around £15,000, Reggie has been placed on display in a glass case in the "Lion's Walk", Macadam Building (Strand campus) in 2002, after being filled with concrete to prevent theft, particularly by University College London (UCL) students who, prior to his burial and dumping, had also castrated him. King's students had also stolen one UCL mascot, Phineas and, allegedly played football with the head of another, Jeremy Bentham.

A small woolly Reggie on wheels was presented to the then Duke and Duchess of York in 1926 as a toy for the infant Princess Elizabeth (later Elizabeth II). The gift was a huge success, prompting the Duchess to write a thank you note saying: "Princess Elizabeth is quite delighted with the red lion and refuses to play with anything else." Another Reggie soft toy was presented in 2019 to Catherine, Princess of Wales (then Duchess of Cambridge) as a gift for the young Prince George during a visit to KCLSU with Elizabeth II to open its new Bush House building.

== Student media ==
Roar! News is the tabloid for students at King's College London and is owned and funded by KCLSU. It is editorially independent of both the university and the students' union and its award winning website is read by tens of thousands of people per month in over 100 countries.

KCLSU Student Media won Student Media of the Year 2014 at the Ents Forum awards and came in the top three student media outlets in the country at the NUS Awards 2014.

KCL Radio is the university radio station of King's College London, England, where it is part of the student media division of the King's College London Students' Union. Located at Strand Campus at Bush House in Central London - previously the headquarters of the BBC World Service - it broadcasts on-campus and worldwide via its website. It has been a member of the Student Radio Association since its inception.

It was established in 2009 as a podcasting society at King's called "The Pod Radio". Its current website was launched in 2010, broadcasting pre-recorded podcasts from the Macadam Building on the Strand Campus. In 2013, the station began to produce live broadcasts for the first time via its website, hosting up to 45 hours of live programming per week during term times., consisting of music, entertainment, news, and sports. These were played in KCLSU shared spaces, as well as via the TuneIn platform and online. As part of KCLSU Student Media, it was ranked as one of the top three student media outlets in the UK at the 2014 NUS Awards. The station won Silver for Best Student Radio Station at the 2016 SRA Awards. In 2018, the station's tagline was rebranded as "The Kings and Queens of Student Radio". Later in 2018, the station was moved to Bush House after the sale of the Macadam Building by KCLSU.

In 2011, KCL Radio produced its first outside broadcast at the London Varsity Series. Since then, it has produced both live and on-demand broadcasts from the London Varsity Series, including a yearly production from the rugby games at Allianz Park. In addition, the station produces coverage of the KCLSU Spring Elections.

=== The Civil Row ===
The Civil Row is branded as the "flagship current affairs panel show" and the centre for political discussion at King's College.

== Services and facilities ==
The Waterfront in the Macadam Building (Strand campus)

KCLSU provides student representation, spaces and activities for students to connect to each other and academic advice. The Academic Advice service provides much of the individual advice and representation to students regarding academic issues and misconduct, while the democratic structures - which are made up of the elected Student Trustees, part-time Officers (which includes Liberation Officers), and full-time Student Officers, who take a sabbatical year to work - enable the Union as a whole to express an opinion on almost any matter related to its charitable objectives. However, like other students' unions, KCLSU does not affiliate to any political party or religious group.

KCLSU also provides almost all the sports clubs, societies and volunteering opportunities available at King's with over 50 sports clubs, 250 societies and student-led engagement and volunteering projects.

Following the closure of the student bar at St Thomas' Hospital in 2005 and the Waterfront Bar in 2018, KCLSU now operates two bars, two cafes, over 12 rooms of indoor Student Activity Space through its four student hubs and the Union Shop. Between 1992 and 2013 the union operated a nightclub, Tutu's, named after alumnus Desmond Tutu, which was closed due to financial mismanagement.

In October 2005, KCLSU was awarded the Investors in People standard. In January 2006, due to increased student concern for the global community, KCLSU took its two-year Fairtrade University campaign as a major priority. In March 2006, the Fairtrade Foundation awarded King's College London Fairtrade University status. It has run campaigns on flexible payment plans for all students, installing nap-pods for those spending long hours at the library, and ensuring better access for disabled students. According to filings with the Charity Commission, it is digitally transforming its services and communications and now engages more students than ever before with a particular focus on engaging postgraduate students. It invested over £1.8m into student groups last year and put £600,000 back into student pockets by providing decent work with London Living Wage to student staff.

KCLSU has two bars and two cafes spread across the Strand and Guy's campuses.

== Politics ==
KCLSU is not officially affiliated to any political party. In recent years the political affiliation of the presidents has varied between Labour, Independent and Conservative. In 2006/07 the president was Labour. 2008-2009 saw a Conservative elected, suspended, and then finally impeached for alleged racist comments at a NUS training event. 2009 to 2011 saw the re-election of a two-term president, Ryan Wain, who was regarded by many as a member of New Labour.

Notable campaigns have included those for widening participation, hidden course costs, housing and accommodation, employment and religious exception.

=== Student-led think tank ===
In November 2010, King's students founded London's first student-led think tank, King's Think Tank. With a membership of approximately 2000, it is the largest organization of its kind in Europe. This student initiative organizes lectures and discussions in seven different policy areas, and assists students in lobbying politicians, NGOs and other policymakers with their ideas. Every May, it produces a peer-reviewed journal of policy recommendations called The Spectrum.

== Union governance ==
The governance of KCLSU has changed much in its history.

Past structures included a proportionally elected Student Representative Council (similar to a 'parliament') with a 14-strong directly elected 'cabinet', known as the executive committee ('Exec') who are also the trustees of the union. Five executive officers are full-time, taking a 'sabbatical' year either at the end or in the middle of their degree. They were informally described as the 'sabbatical officers' ('sabbs') but in theory hold no more constitutional weight on the Exec than the part-time officers. Before this, policy was determined at union general meetings, which all full members of KCLSU were entitled to attend and vote at.

This structure then changed to a 30-strong, cross-campus, un-proportionally elected student council from 2006–07 until 2010–11. The SC was made up of students still studying on their course, and so representation was a voluntary activity. The SC was supported by and worked with four elected full-time student officers (still often referred to as Sabbs).

For the 2010-11 academic year, student council evolved into a 50-strong cabinet of cross-campus elected students. Within the 50, councillors had specific or open roles, with the council being made up as follows: 30 general representatives - who work with all students in mind 7 campaign officers - who work to represent particular 'constituencies', or causes, identified as under represented by KCLSU officers in the summer 2011 4 liberation officers - who work to represent 'oppressed' groups, as identified by the NUS: women, LGBT, disabled and BME students 5 NUS delegates - who will attend the NUS annual conference in the spring, as well as working to represent students at King's throughout the year to council 4 academic board reps - who alongside attending and representing students at council, also represent students at the college's four academic boards.

=== 2004 governance review ===
==== Background ====
In 2004, KCLSU launched an ambitious, wide-ranging and grassroots review of its governance. A management consultant (formerly a student union general manager) and a leading firm of charity lawyers worked together to examine the nature of the legal relationship between the college and the union, where the responsibility lay, and how best to serve the interests of students. The report was published in early 2005 and suggested a set of proposals that would reflect the balance of responsibility and authority within the students' union.

==== Trustee board ====
The trustee board now has overall responsibility for the legal, strategic and financial health of KCLSU. As of 2026, it is composed of six full-time student officers, four student trustees and four lay trustees.

== Union leadership and management ==
The overall management and leadership of KCLSU is delegated over to the chief executive by the trustee board. The chief executive works alongside the elected sabbatical officers and the union's Senior Leadership Team (SLT) to set, review and meet the strategic objectives of the union. Unlike the sabbatical officer role, which is an elected role, the chief executive is a permanent staff role and reports to the union president and vice-chair of the trustee board. At present, the chief executive of KCLSU is Denis Shukur, who took up the role in May 2018.
