= BUCS Football League =

- Founded: 1994
- Country: United Kingdom
- Confederation: EUSA
- Divisions: 100
- Number of clubs: 450+
- Domestic cup(s): BUCS Football Championship, Trophy and Conference Cup
- Website: bucs.org.uk/football

The BUCS Football League is the association football league system of British Universities and Colleges Sport (BUCS). It is the largest sport in UK higher education, with over 500 men's and women's teams competing in 100 leagues.

== Competition format ==
The league follows the standard BUCS double pyramid, with two Premier divisions (North and South) sitting above five regions (Scottish, Northern, Midlands, Western and South Eastern). There are five divisions, one for each region, in the top regional tier (Tier 1), but at lower tiers the regions may be sub-divided into A, B, etc. divisions on a geographical basis. There are eight levels (Premier to Tier 7) in the men's pyramid and five (Premier to Tier 4) in the women's pyramid.

Divisions each consist of six teams, with the exception of the bottom division in each region. Teams in divisions with six or fewer teams play each other twice, home and away, while teams in divisions with seven or more teams play once, either home or away. All teams from the two Premier divisions enter the knockout Championship, teams in Tier 1 enter the Trophy, and teams in Tier 2 and below enter the Conference Cup. The bottom team from each Premier division and the top first teams from Tier 1 enter a promotion/relegation playoff at the end of the season; promotion and relegation between the regional tiers is automatic.

== Former winners ==
Year		Championship	Premier North	Premier South
2025-26	Men	Nottingham	Stirling	Hartpury
2025-26	Women	Northumbria	Nottingham	Exeter
2024-25	Men	Loughborough	Newcastle	Exeter
2024-25	Women	St. Andrews	Loughborough	Bristol
2023-24	Men	Hartpury	Stirling	Chichester
2023-24	Women	Loughborough	St. Andrews	South Wales
2022-23	Men	Durham	Stirling	Bath
2022-23	Women	Nottingham	Loughborough	Bristol
2021-22	Men	Loughborough	Stirling	Hartpury
2021-22	Women	Loughborough	Loughborough	Cardiff Met
2020-21	Men	all competitions suspended due to COVID-19 pandemic		
2020-21	Women	all competitions suspended due to COVID-19 pandemic		
2019-20	Men	national championships suspended due to COVID-19 pandemic	Stirling	Hartpury
2019-20	Women	national championships suspended due to COVID-19 pandemic	Northumbria	Cardiff Met
2018–19	Men	South Wales	Northumbria	South Wales
2018–19	Women	Northumbria	Northumbria	Cardiff Met
2017–18	Men	Cardiff Met	Nottingham Trent	Cardiff Met
2017–18	Women	Durham	Durham	Hertfordshire
2016–17	Men	Cardiff Met	Loughborough	Hartpury
2016–17	Women	Durham	Durham	Cardiff Met
2015–16	Men	USW	Durham	Hartpury
2015–16	Women	Northumbria	Durham	Cardiff Met
2014–15	Men	Hartpury	Loughborough	USW
2014–15	Women	Durham	Durham	Cardiff Met
2013–14	Men	Stirling	Stirling	Hartpury
2013–14	Women	Cardiff Met	Durham	Hertfordshire
2012–13	Men	Loughborough	Loughborough	Hartpury
2012–13	Women	Cardiff Met	Loughborough	Cardiff Met
2011–12	Men	Bath	Loughborough	Hartpury
2011–12	Women	Loughborough	Northumbria	Cardiff Met
2010–11	Men	Hartpury	Stirling	Hartpury
2010–11	Women	Northumbria	Leeds Beckett	Hertfordshire
2009–10	Men	Loughborough	Leeds	Hartpury
2009–10	Women	Northumbria	Leeds Beckett	Hertfordshire
2008–09	Men	Loughborough	Loughborough	Hartpury
2008–09	Women	Leeds Beckett	Leeds Beckett	Hertfordshire
2007–08	Men	Hartpury	Birmingham	Hartpury
2007–08	Women	Cardiff Met	Leeds Beckett	Cardiff Met
2006–07	Men	Hartpury	Loughborough	Brighton
2006–07	Women	Loughborough	Loughborough	Cardiff Met
2005–06	Men	Loughborough	Northumbria	Bath
2005–06	Women	Loughborough	Loughborough	Cardiff Met
2004–05	Men	Loughborough	Loughborough	Swansea
2004–05	Women	Bath	Loughborough	Bath

Note: for consistency, current names are used throughout the table, e.g. Leeds Beckett rather than Leeds Met and Cardiff Met rather than UWIC.

Season	Championship	Trophy	Shield	Plate	Vase
2004–05	Loughborough University 1st	MMU Cheshire 2nd	UWE Hartpury 1st	University of Sussex 1st	University of Strathclyde 2nd
2005–06	Loughborough University 1st	UWE Hartpury 1st	De Montfort University, Bedford 1st	Leeds Metropolitan Carnegie 2nd	
2006–07	UWE Hartpury 1st	University of Manchester 1st	University of Hull 1st	Bournemouth University 1st	Northumbria University 3rd
2007–08	UWE Hartpury 1st	University of Bath 2nd	University of Manchester 1st	University of Central Lancashire 1st	University of Nottingham 4th
