= The London Varsity =

University sports rivalry in London, England

The London Varsity is an annual university sporting competition contested between the students of University College London and King's College London, the two founding colleges of the University of London. Established in 2004 by Adam Sommerfeld as an annual rugby union match, in 2014, the London Varsity expanded to include six other sports. In 2025 over 40 sporting fixtures were included in an expanded program now referred to as the London Varsity Series taking place over a week in March.

== The London Varsity Series ==
In 2014, a decision was made jointly by University College London Union and King's College London Students' Union to expand the varsity competition to include six sports in addition to the traditional rugby fixture.

Since 2014 the London Varsity series has flourished, becoming a staple feature in the calendar of both universities and now includes over 40 sporting fixtures played across one week in March. The fixtures usually include both a men's and women's game and the Hockey, Netball and Football fixtures include matches between both unions' hockey clubs as well as both unions' medics' hockey clubs. Each varsity fixture is worth one point, the university with the most points overall at the end of the series takes home the London Varsity Series title.

Every year an overall Player of The Series Award is a presented to the outstanding performer of the series. The inaugural winner of The Player of The Series Award was Septimus Theodoulou Knox from UCLU Men's Rugby.

The lineup for the 2025 London Varsity Series included 42 fixtures in the following sports:

- American Football
- Athletics
- Badminton
- Barbell
- Baseball
- Basketball
- Boat Club
- Cycling
- Esports
- Equestrian
- Fencing
- Football
- Futsal
- Handball
- Hockey
- Lacrosse
- Karting
- Kendo
- Muay Thai
- Netball
- Pole Fitness
- Rowing
- Rugby Union
- Squash
- Swimming
- Taekwondo
- Table Tennis
- Tennis
- Ultimate Frisbee
- Volleyball
- Water Polo

The London Varsity Series trophy is traditionally known as the "Jeremy George Cup" named after the founders of the respective universities, Jeremy Bentham and King George IV.

The 2026 London Varsity Series title holder is University College London.

=== London Varsity Series Results ===
No.	Date	Winner	Score	Total wins	
No.	Date	Winner	Score	UCL	KCL
1	2014	UCL	14-7	1	0
2	2015	UCL		2	0
3	2016	King’s		2	1
4	2017	UCL		3	1
5	2018	UCL		4	1
6	2019	UCL	21-15	5	1
7	2020	UCL	21-15	6	1
8	2021	UCL		7	1
9	2022	King’s	15-13	7	2
10	2023	UCL	17-12	8	2
11	2024	UCL	18-13	9	2
12	2025	UCL	24-18	10	2
13	2026	UCL	26-11	11	2

== Rugby Union ==
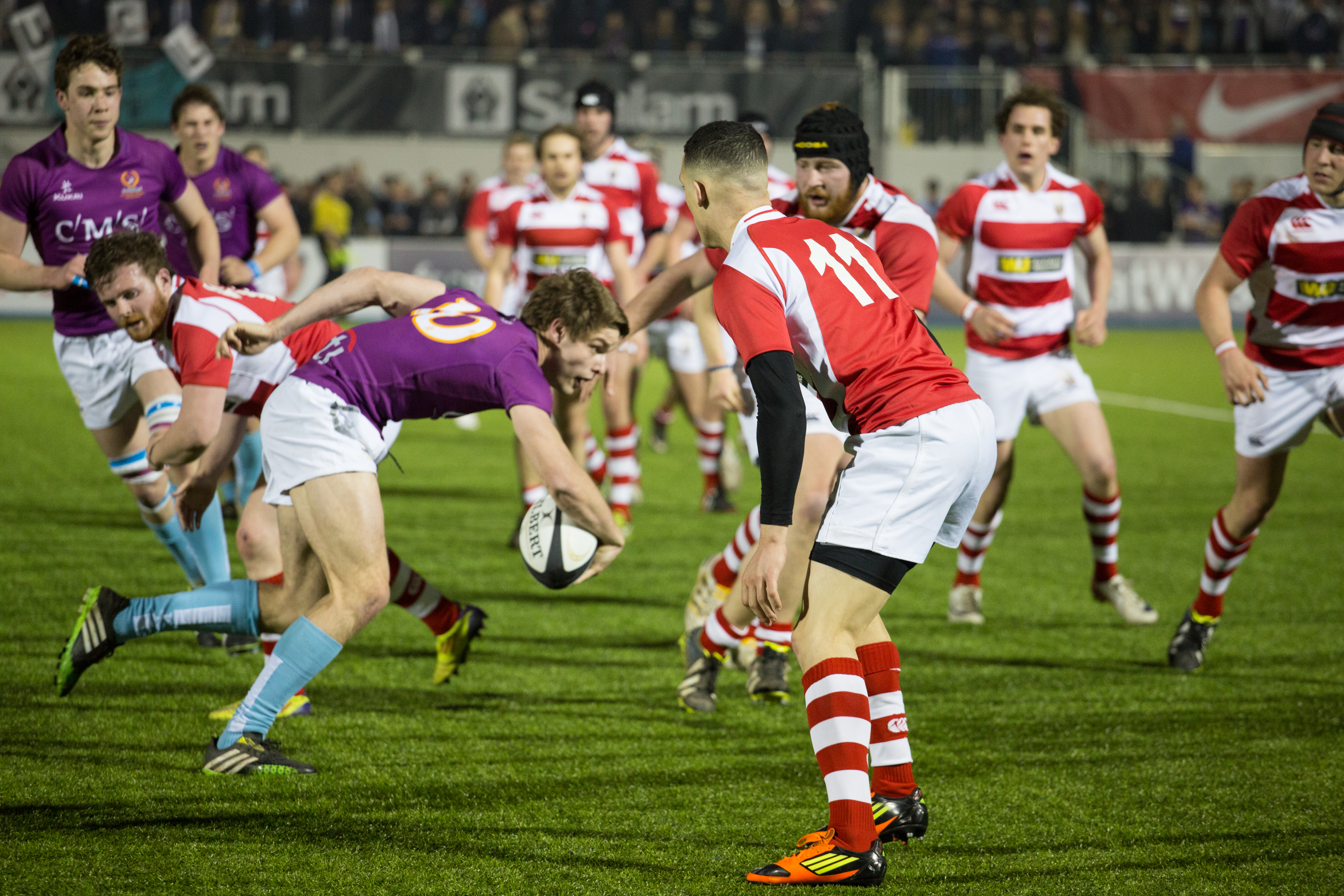
The 2014 London Varsity rugby match played between University College London and King's College London

Founded in 2004 by Adam Sommerfeld as an annual rugby union fixture, the game celebrates the rivalry between University College London and King's College London, which spans nearly two centuries.

The London Varsity rugby match is organized by the UCLU and the KCLSU. It is held at the end of the University Rugby season in March. The venue for both the men’s and women’s annual matches has alternated between the Richmond Athletic Ground, the Barnet Copthall stadium, the Twickenham Stoop, and most recently Trailfinders Sports Ground.

=== Results ===
In the modern era:

Men's Games:

2004: UCL 19–7 KCL
2005: UCL 11–7 KCL
2006: UCL
2007: UCL 18–5 KCL
2008: UCL
2009: KCL 12 -10 UCL
2010: UCL
2011: KCL 17–15 UCL
2012: UCL 24–7 KCL
2013: Not played
2014: UCL 16–9 KCL
2015: KCL 37–10 UCL
2016: KCL 23–11 UCL
2017: UCL 16 –10 KCL
2018: UCL 15 –11 KCL
2019: Not played
2020: KCL 27–12 UCL
2021: UCL 49–7 KCL
2022: UCL 12-8 KCL
2023: UCL 17-12 KCL
2024: UCL 10-7 KCL
2025: UCL 24-20 KCL
2026: UCL 24-19 KCL

Women's Games:

2007: UCL
2008: UCL
2009: UCL
2010: UCL
2011: UCL 38–5 KCL
2012: UCL 28–5 KCL
2013: Not played
2014: UCL 10–7 KCL
2015: UCL 30–12 KCL
2016: KCL 48–0 UCL
2017: KCL 17–0 UCL
2018: KCL 5–0 UCL
2019: UCL 15–10 KCL
2020: KCL 29–10 UCL
2021: KCL 38-0 UCL
2022: KCL 12-5 UCL
2023: KCL 12-10 UCL
2024: KCL 20-5 UCL
2025: KCL 25-0 UCL
2026: UCL 27–17 KCL

Total Matches (Men's)	KCL Wins	UCL Wins	Draws
21	5	16	0

Total Matches (Women's)	KCL Wins	UCL Wins	Draws
18	9	9	0

== See also ==
- KCLSU
- UCLU
- The Varsity Match
- The Scottish Varsity
- RFU
