= Artist (disambiguation) =

An artist is a person engaged in creating art or practicing the arts, especially the visual arts.

Artist or artiste may also refer to:

== People ==
- The Artist (formerly known as Prince), stage name of Prince (1958–2016), American musician
- Prince Iaukea or The Artist (born 1964), professional wrestler
- Johnny Jebsen (1917–1945), World War II anti-Nazi German intelligence officer and British double agent (codename ARTIST)
- Lartiste (born 1985) French-Moroccan rapper and singer
- The Artist (association football), English for "L'Artiste", nickname of footballer Michael Olise (born 2001)

== Places ==
- Artist Lake, a lake located in Middle Island, New York, United States
- Café des Artistes (1917–2009) New York City, New York, United States; fine dining restaurant
- The Artist's Garden
- The Artists' Studio, community theatre in Indiana, United States
- The Artists Project
- The Artists Village
- The Artists' Place
- The Artist as Hephaestus
- The Artist as a Young Machine

== Stage, film, television, radio ==
- Artists (film), a 1928 German film
- The Artist (film), a 2011 French film romance
- Artist (film), a 2013 Malayalam film
- Artiste (film), a 2025 Indian film
- "The Artist" (TV series), an American television series
- "The Artist" (The Super Mario Bros. Super Show!), a live-action segment from a 1989 television episode
- "The Artist" (Suspects), a 2015 television episode
- Artists (radio series), 2003 BBS radio programme

== Literature ==
- The Artist (novel), 2025 novel by Lucy Steeds
- The Artist (UK magazine), launched in 1931
- The Artist (Russian magazine), published in 1889–1895
- The Artist and Journal of Home Culture, or The Artist, an arts monthly published 1880–1902
- L'Artiste, a weekly illustrated review published in Paris from 1831 to 1904

== Music ==
- Artist (EP), a 2012 EP by Teen Top
- Artist (mixtape), by A Boogie wit da Hoodie
- "L.E.S. Artistes", a single by Santigold from the 2008 album Santogold

== Other uses ==
- Café des Artistes (1917–2009) New York City, New York, United States; fine dining restaurant

== See also ==
- The Artist's Magazine, magazine published in Cincinnati
- The Artists' Studio, community theatre in Indiana, United States
- Art (disambiguation)
- Mario Artist, Super Mario video game series
