= TAS =

TAS, Tas, tas, or TAs may refer to:

== Places ==
- Tasmania, Australia, an abbreviation
- Tas-Anna, a rural locality in Neryuktyayinsky 1-y Rural Okrug of Olyokminsky District in the Sakha Republic, Russia
- Tas-Kystabyt, a mountain range in Far East Russia
- Tas-Silġ, a rounded hilltop overlooking Marsaxlokk Bay, Malta, close to the city of Żejtun
- River Tas, in Norfolk, England

== People ==
- Taş, Turkish-language surname
- Nickname of Tasmiyah Janeesha Whitehead, arrested for the murder of Nikki Whitehead

=== Given name ===
- Tas Baitieri (born 1958), Australian former rugby league footballer and coach
- Tas Bull (1932–2003), Australian trade union leader
- Tas Pappas (born 1975), Australian skateboarder
- Tas, father of Lél (Lehel), one of the Seven chieftains of the Magyars

=== Surname ===
- Adam Tas (1668–1722), South African community leader
- Adam Tas (singer) (born 1981), South African singer and songwriter in Afrikaans
- András Róna-Tas (born 1931), Hungarian historian and linguist
- Henk Tas (born 1948), Dutch visual artist and photographer
- Marcelo Tas (born 1959), Brazilian director, writer, actor and television host
- Marja van der Tas (born 1958), Dutch politician
- Niels Tas (born 1983), Belgian politician
- Rudi Tas (born 1957), Flemish Belgian composer, conductor and organist

== Media, arts and entertainment ==
- The Absolute Sound, an American audiophile magazine
- Star Trek: The Animated Series
- Tas (series), science fiction novels by E.C. Eliott
- Tasslehoff Burrfoot, a character in Dragonlance novels

== Military ==
- 44M Tas, a WW2 medium/heavy tank from Hungary
- Tas-Samra Battery, a 1798–1800 artillery battery in Ħamrun, Malta
- TAs, the Romanian designation of the German Sturmgeschütz III assault gun

== Organizations ==
- Taxpayer Advocate Service, United States
- The Artists' Studio, a community theatre in Indiana, United States
- The Atlas Society, an organization that promotes Objectivism, the philosophy of Ayn Rand
- Travelers' Aid Society (spelled "Travellers" outside the US), a charitable organization
- The Autobiography Society, organization studying autobiography and biography

=== Education ===
- Taipei American School, Taipei, Taiwan (Republic of China)
- Tehran American School, Tehran, Iran
- The Armidale School, New South Wales, Australia
- The Associated Schools, a group of schools in Queensland, Australia
- Trinity Anglican School, Cairns, Queensland, Australia

=== Sports ===
- TAS de Casablanca, a Moroccan football club
- TAS Racing, a motorcycle team in Moneymore, County Londonderry, Northern Ireland
- HK Taš, an ice hockey club in Belgrade, Serbia
- Court of Arbitration for Sport (French: Tribunal arbitral du sport), Lausanne, Switzerland

=== Transportation ===
- Lotus Air (ICAO code: TAS), Egyptian airline
- Tashkent International Airport (IATA code: TAS), Uzbekistan
- TAS – Transportes Aéreos Salvador, defunct Brazilian airline
- TasRail, a train operator owned by the Government of Tasmania
- Tvornica Automobila Sarajevo, a former Yugoslav automobile manufacturer; see Volkswagen Golf Mk1 § Rabbit Pickup/VW Caddy

== Science and technology ==
=== Computing and telecommunications ===
- Thermal-assisted switching, an approach to computer memory
- Tool-assisted speedrun, in video games
- Telephony application server, in telecommunications
- Test-and-set, an atomic instruction in synchronization

=== Material science ===
- Transient-absorption spectroscopy, a form of time-resolved spectroscopy
- TAS classification, for types of volcanic rocks

=== Medicine ===
- Transesophageal atrial stimulation
- TAS-102, a cancer drug
- TAS-108 or SR16234, a steroid hormone
- Trent Accreditation Scheme, in UK healthcare

=== Other fields ===
- Traffic Advisory System, for aircraft (e. g. TCAS)
- True airspeed, of an aircraft
- Total analysis system, chemical analysis technology
- Neutron triple-axis spectrometry, a technique used in inelastic neutron scattering

== Other uses ==
- Tas (clan), an agricultural clan in India and Pakistan
- Tas kebab, a Turkish meat stew
- Tool-assisted speedrun, a type of speedrun in the video gaming scene, commonly abbreviated to TAS

== See also ==
- Taz (disambiguation)
