= Sebastián de Vivanco =

Spanish priest and composer

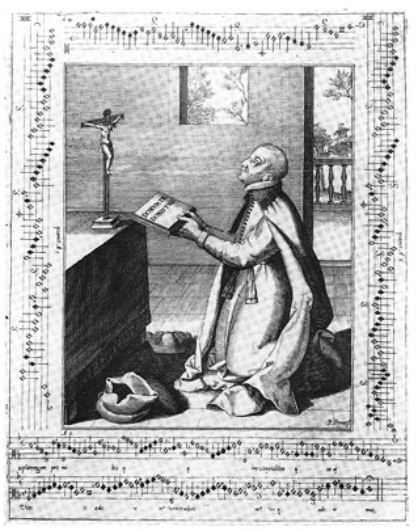
A likeness of Vivanco on the original cover page of his Liber Magnificarum

Sebastián de Vivanco (c. 1551 in Ávila – October 26, 1622 in Salamanca) was a Spanish priest and composer of the Renaissance.

== Life ==
Vivanco was born in Ávila, like Tomás Luis de Victoria; however, the exact date of his birth is unknown. It is hypothesized that he was born a few years after Victoria and that they both knew each other as children and sang together at the chapel of the Cathedral of Ávila. During the time that Vivanco sang in the chorus, the maestri di cappella were Gerónimo de Espinar, Bernardino de Ribera (1559) and Juan Navarro Hispalensis (1563). This last composer had the most profound influence on Vivanco. After 1566, with the change in his voice, Vivanco commenced studies as a priest, as Victoria had done.

Around 1576, while still a subdeacon, he was named maestro di cappella at the Cathedral of Lérida, but shortly thereafter, on July 4, 1576, he was dismissed from this position. Upon his return to Castille, in February 1577, he was named maestro di cappella at the Cathedral of Segovia, a position of higher prestige and pay than the previous ones. He moved there with his mother and remained there for the following ten years. During this period he became a deacon and then, in 1581, was ordained as a priest.

In 1588, he returned to his native city, Ávila, in order to take charge of the cathedral chapel. He remained here until 1602, when he took possession of the position of maestro di cappella at the Cathedral of Salamanca. This was his last position and the most important to his musical contributions. His three publications were printed during his time in this city. On February 19, 1603, he became professor of music at the University of Salamanca, and on March 4 of the same year, he received the degree of Master of Arts honoris causa. Vivanco was occupied with his position in the cathedral of the university until his death, on October 26, 1622.

== Work ==
The bulk of Vivanco's surviving work was published in three books in Salamanca between 1607 and 1610 by the printer Artus Taberniel of Antwerp, who by then was the official printer of the University of Salamanca. The books contain a selection probably chosen by the composer himself of his best pieces, spanning over 40 years of work. The books are:

- Liber magnificarum. Published in 1607. Contains 18 versions of the Magnificat. Consists of 270 pages in choral format. The cover page contains a likeness of the composer kneeling before a crucifix. It is considered his most important work.
- Libro de misas. Published in 1608. Three extant copies are known, one of which is in the Church of Santa Maria la Mayor de Ledesma, Salamanca, and two other fragments in Granada and Seville. It contains 10 masses:
  - Missa Assumpsit Jesus, (5v)
  - Missa in festo Beata Maria Virgine, (4v)
  - Missa Beata Virgine in sabbato, (4v)
  - Missa Crux fidelis, (6v)
  - Missa Doctor bonus, (4v)
  - Missa In manus tuas, (8v)
  - Missa O quam suavis es, Domine, (4v)
  - Missa quarti toni, (4v)
  - Missa sexti toni, (4v)
  - Missa super octos tonos, (4v)
- Libro de motetes. Published in 1610. Two copies survive, one in the Cathedral of Salamanca and the other in the Cathedral of Segovia. Both are incomplete. However, the copy in Salamanca is only missing a few pages, and approximately 70 motets remain.

Another book of motets was also printed in Salamanca in 1614, by Francisco de Ceatesa. The only known copy of this edition is held in the Metropolitan Cathedral of Mexico. It contains 74 motets and is similar to the book published in 1610.

Other works are extant in various manuscripts, though their identification and cataloguing has yet to be completed. Among the manuscripts are:

- Two choral books copied for the Monastery of Guadalupe, in Extremadura, copied at the beginning of the 17th century. They contain:
  - 3 masses:
    - Missa Tu es vas electionis
    - Misa para dias feriados
    - Missa de Requiem taciturna
  - Portions of the office for the dead
  - A version of the hymn Vexilla regis for Passiontide
  - 3 Lamentations of Jeremiah for Holy Week
  - 2 small pieces
- Various manuscripts from the beginning of the 17th century pertaining to the Cathedral of Salamanca, containing motets and hymns.

== Discography ==
Recordings dedicated entirely to Vivanco or which include some of his works are the following:

- 1985 - Treasures of the Spanish Renaissance. Westminster Cathedral Choir. David Hill. CDA66168.
- 1998 - Mortuus Est Philippus Rex: Music For The Life And Death Of The Spanish King. Westminster Cathedral Choir. James O'Donnell. Hyperion.
- 1999 - Canticum Canticorum. Orchestra of the Renaissance. Richard Cheetham y Michael Noone. Glossa 921403. 1999.
- 2003 - Lobo: Lamentationes. Vivanco: Missa Assumpsit Iesus. Musica Reservata de Barcelona. Bruno Turner. La mà de guido 2045.
- 2003 - Sebastian de Vivanco. In Manus Tuas. Orchestra of the Renaissance. Michael Noone. Glossa GCD 921405.
- 2003 - Sebastian de Vivanco- Sancti et Justi, Libro de Motetes 1610. Capilla Flamenca y Oltremontano. Dirk Snellings, Wim Becu. Cantus C 9649. 2016.
- 2005 - Sebastian de Vivanco. Missa Crux Fidelis. Motets. The Choir of King's College London. David Trendell. Gaudeamus.
- 2018 - Sebastian de Vivanco. Missa Assumpsit Jesus. Motets. De Profundis. Robert Hollingworth. Hyperion.
- 2022 - Sebastian de Vivanco- Libro de Motetes 1610, vol. 2. Capilla Flamenca y Oltremontano. Dirk Snellings, Wim Becu. Cantus C 9669. 2022
- 2026 - Sebastián Vivanco- Missa pro Defunctis & Motets. Renaissance Singers. David Allinson. Toccata Classics.
