= The Careers Group, University of London =

The Careers Group, University of London was a division of the central University of London, serving the collective needs of a number of its college-based services, and collectively - until 2019, comprised the largest higher education careers and employability service in Europe.

From 2014-2024, it existed as a membership organisation, supporting the independent services of each constituent college, which are supported by a central provision of staff and expertise.

In 2024, the final central staffing was moved to the remaining constituent college members and the Group ceased as a membership organisation, instead restructuring into a new interim body (The Centre for Careers and Employability) providing some 'buy in' services alongside supporting the central University of London Careers Service which distance learners and students studying at the small and specialist federation colleges without their own local careers provision can access. The whole Centre will close in August 2025.

== History ==
=== The early years ===
The organisation first came into existence in 1909 as the University of London Appointments Board when students and graduates paid five shillings to be registered. Within three years the first permanent full-time secretary, Dr Arthur Du Pre Denning, had been appointed, 307 students had been registered and 1,340 vacancies had been notified to graduates. With the appointment of the next secretary, Mr Henry James Crawford in 1910, these numbers continued to increase and the first advertisement of their services was placed in The Times of 14 June 1914. Their growing importance in the employment of University of London graduates was noted by Sanderson, M (1972).

Registration fell during the period of the First World War but continued to grow again steadily after the Board merged with The Commerce Degree Bureau of the University in 1922. Jointly they became the University of London Commerce Degree Bureau and Appointments Board, newly located in 46 Russell Square, Bloomsbury. Registration topped the thousand mark for the first time, at 1,228, in 1927-28.

In 1936 the board enjoyed a brief spell at premises in the newly built Senate House, only to be evacuated to Thornaugh Street, Bloomsbury, at the start of the Second World War to make way for the Ministry of Information. These temporary offices were very soon destroyed during the Blitz in 1940. After the end of the war, the Board was once again stationed in Senate House, where registrations again began to climb towards 2,000, until it was given its own premises at 49 Gordon Square in 1957 where huge organisational changes occurred.

=== Adapting to Change ===
Use of the Board’s services had grown by 15.5% and 34.7% in 1961 and 1962 respectively and a new way had to be found to cope with not only the huge increase in student numbers but also the geographical spread of the University’s colleges and institutes. This was solved by the introduction of Field Officers in 1964 who were members of the Board stationed in the colleges themselves and who were therefore easily accessible to users. By 1966 Field Officers were present in a total of seven colleges, with King’s College London being the first to request their presence.

The next major change occurred in July 1970 when the Senate of the University of London agreed that the name of the Appointments Board be changed to the University of London Careers Advisory Board and the services they provide be known as the University of London Careers Advisory Service or ULCAS. This also led to a further reorganisation of their structure into an integrated operations division which carried out the advisory work and a support services division which carried out all other functions. A further name change followed in 1994 when ULCAS was shortened to ULCS for convenience, but no major structural reorganization occurred.

=== Rebranding ===
On June 30, 2004, the Council of the University agreed that ULCS could change its name to The Careers Group, University of London as this more accurately reflected the nature of the organisation. The name change was accompanied by the launch of a new brand image which was rolled out across all products and services. Some re-structuring took place including within the Commercial Division which led to a unified Events Team.

In 2005, about a year after the re-branding exercise, The Careers Group moved to new purpose-built premises, having spent 48 years in Gordon Square. UCL Careers Service and SICS moved to the University of London Union Building whilst the Directorate, Central Services and C2 moved to Stewart House, Russell Square. The Chancellor, The Princess Royal, visited the new premises as part of her tour of the newly refurbished Stewart House.

== Organisation ==
=== Location ===
The Centre has a central headquarters in Stewart House in Russell Square which also acts as the base for the Group's Professional Development Unit (PDU), Research Unit and the University of London Careers Service, which delivers central careers support for the federation's smallest colleges, School of Advanced Study and to the central University's distance learners around the world.

All other colleges of the federal University who choose to access services from the Centre, can choose to buy in provision and support from a range of options. These are (on occasion) also opened up to other universities to draw on elements of the combined central services.

The Centre's membership and structure changed dramatically in recent years in line with broader changes in the University of London's college structure, with a number of colleges departing from the collective. In 2024, it moved to a new 'service only' model of support and ceased the membership group structure when it rebranded as the Centre for Careers and Employability.

From 2014 to 2024, member colleges operated independently and with their own strategies, leadership and provision. At its restructuring in early 2024 when the Group ceased to operate staffing aspects to individual colleges, the final member services were:

- King's College London (excluding King's Business School)
- The School of Oriental and African Studies
- University College London (including UCL School of Management)
- University of London Careers Service, providing services to:
- The Courtauld Institute of Art
- The Institute of Cancer Research
- London School of Hygiene and Tropical Medicine
- The Royal Veterinary College
- St. George's, University of London
- School of Advanced Study, University of London
- University of London (Distance and Flexible Learning), formerly University of London Worldwide

Additionally, both St Mary's and City will leave the Centre in 2024, leaving only a couple of remaining members.

=== Former Members and Non-affiliated colleges ===
Since inception, many colleges which have joined the federal University, founded or been merged have chosen to depart from the Group or chose to operate independently:

- Birkbeck, University of London
- Bayes Business School, City, University of London (retained independent services when City joined the federal University and Group in 2016)
- City, University of London (left in 2024)
- Goldsmiths, University of London (left in 2023)
- Imperial College London (left Group before then leaving federal University in 2007)
- King's Business School, King's College London (joined in 2017 upon foundation and left in 2021 whilst King's remained at large)
- The London School of Economics and Political Science (left in 2008)
- London Business School
- Queen Mary University of London (left in 2022)
- The Royal Central School of Speech and Drama
- Royal Holloway, University of London (left in 2021)
- St Mary's University, Twickenham (not a member of the University of London but part of the Group until 2024)

=== Structure and Organisation ===
Each college careers service was managed independently, with their own strategy, services and provision tailored to their own College. They are headed by a Head of Service who was a Careers Group employee, alongside Deputies and Careers Consultants who are also employed by the University of London until 2024.

Additional staff in each College, including supporting Employer Engagement, Systems, Student Engagement, Communications, Entrepreneurship, Work-based Learning, Data and Research are employed locally by the respective local colleges.

The Central Services team consisted of:

Vacancies Team

This department is responsible for the identification, curation and dissemination of job opportunities to a number of affiliated colleges.

Research Unit

This department is responsible for the collection, analysis and dissemination of statistical information for both the Group as a whole, and supporting member colleges.

Content and Information

This department is responsible for the updating and maintenance of occupational careers information, videos and other areas such as working overseas, self-employment and voluntary work. It is also responsible for the selection and acquisition of reference books and periodicals. The department also manages content on the intranet and The Careers Group website.

=== Personnel ===
In addition to the Director, a Group Strategic Leadership Team (GSLT) is formed of the Heads of each large member college service, the Head of the Education Consultancy and Director of Research & Organisational Development.

== Quality Assurance ==
The Careers Group has been accredited with the Matrix quality standard, for information advice and guidance services, since 2004. It most recently passed re-accreditation in June 2020. They are also a member of the Association of Graduate Careers Advisory Services (AGCAS).

== See also ==
- Careers Advisory Services
