= Strand Campus =

Campus of King's College London

Coordinates: 51°30′43″N 0°07′00″W

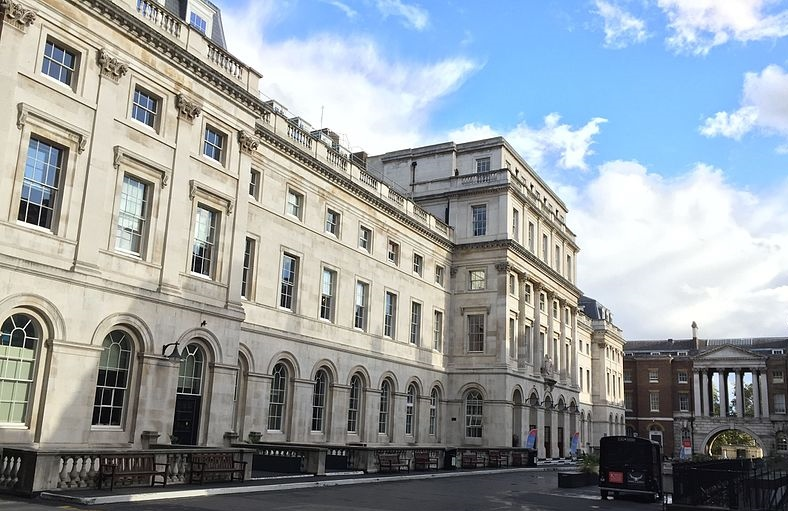
King's Building in the Strand Quadrangle

The Strand Campus is the founding campus of King's College London and is located on the Strand in the City of Westminster, adjacent to Somerset House and continuing its frontage along the River Thames. The original campus comprises the Grade I listed King's Building of 1831 designed by Sir Robert Smirke, and the college chapel, redesigned in 1864 by Sir George Gilbert Scott with the subsequent purchase of much of adjacent Surrey Street (including the Norfolk and Chesham Buildings) since the Second World War and the 1972 Strand Building. The Macadam Building of 1975 previously housed the Strand Campus Students' Union and is named after King's alumnus Sir Ivison Macadam, first President of the National Union of Students.

The Strand Campus houses the arts and science faculties of King's, including the Faculties of Arts & Humanities, Law, Social Science & Public Policy and Natural & Mathematical Sciences (formerly Physical Sciences & Engineering & Computer Science). The Strand is also home to King's College London Archives, which holds a number of collections including the papers of Field Marshal Alan Brooke, 1st Viscount Alanbrooke.

Since 2010, the campus has expanded rapidly to incorporate the East Wing of Somerset House and the Virginia Woolf Building next to LSE on Kingsway. In 2015, King's acquired a 50-year lease for the Aldwych Quarter site incorporating the historic Bush House. It began occupation of Bush House and Strand House on a phased basis, starting with the north west wing of Bush House in September 2016, with King House and Melbourne House to be added from 2025.

The nearest Underground stations are Temple, Charing Cross and Covent Garden.

== Buildings ==
=== King's Building ===
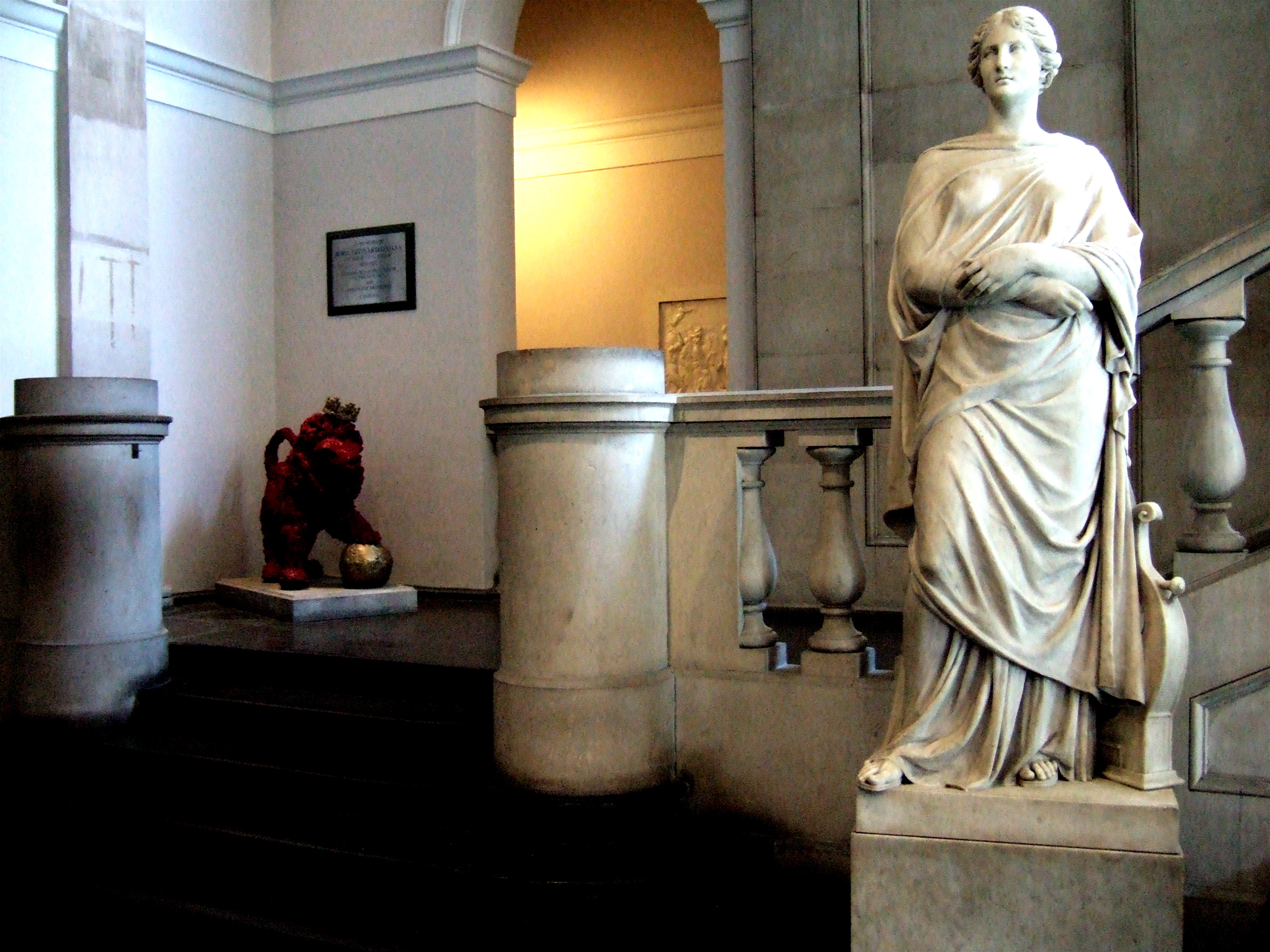
A Classical sculpture of Sappho in the King's Building, Strand Campus

The Grade I listed King's Building was designed by Sir Robert Smirke in 1831. It is the founding building of King's, located alongside Somerset House. Sir John Nash (the architect of Buckingham Palace) offered free services for the building, yet this was declined by King's since the same was in favour of the services of Sir Robert Smirke (the architect of the British Museum and King's neighbour, Somerset House).

Marble statues of Sappho and Sophocles were bequeathed by Frida Mond in 1923, a friend of Israel Gollancz, Professor of English Language and Literature at King's. They were placed in the foyer (old entrance hall) of the King's Building, where they have remained ever since. The two statues symbolise King's motto of sancte et sapienter ('with holiness and with wisdom'). The Great Hall is one of the central congregation spaces within the King's Building. Many original features and styles of the Hall, such as the oak panelling and the King's College crest, were repaired, and Grade I listed windows, ceiling and column capital were refurbished in the 21st century.

=== Chapel ===
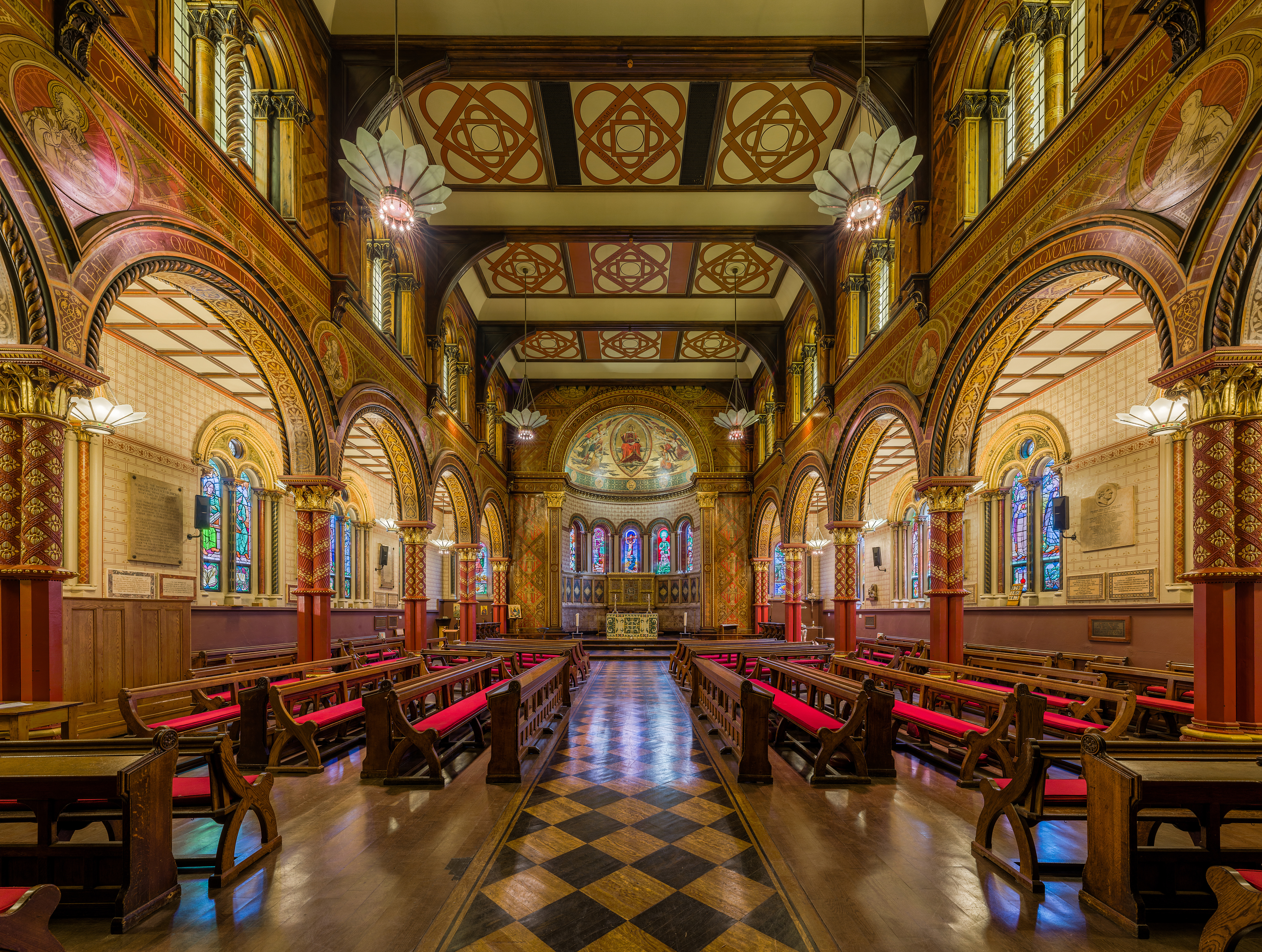
The Grade I listed King's College London chapel on the Strand Campus seen today was redesigned in 1864 by Sir George Gilbert Scott

The original King's College London Chapel was designed by Sir Robert Smirke and was completed in 1831 as part of the King's building. Given the foundation of the university in the tradition of the Church of England the chapel was intended to be an integral part of the campus. This is reflected in its central location within the King's Building on the first floor above the Great Hall, accessible via a grand double staircase from the foyer. The original chapel was described as a low and broad room "fitted to the ecclesiological notions of George IV's reign." However, by the mid nineteenth century its style had fallen out of fashion and in 1859 a proposal by King's chaplain, the Reverend E. H. Plumptre, that the original chapel should be reconstructed was approved by King's College London council, who agreed that its "meagreness and poverty" made it unworthy of King's.

King's approached Sir George Gilbert Scott to make proposals. In his proposal of 22 December 1859 he suggested that, "There can be no doubt that, in a classic building, the best mode of giving ecclesiastical character is the adoption of the form and, in some degree, the character of an ancient basilica." His proposals for a chapel modelled on the lines of a classical basilica were accepted and the reconstruction was completed in 1864 at a cost of just over £7,000.

=== Somerset House East Wing ===
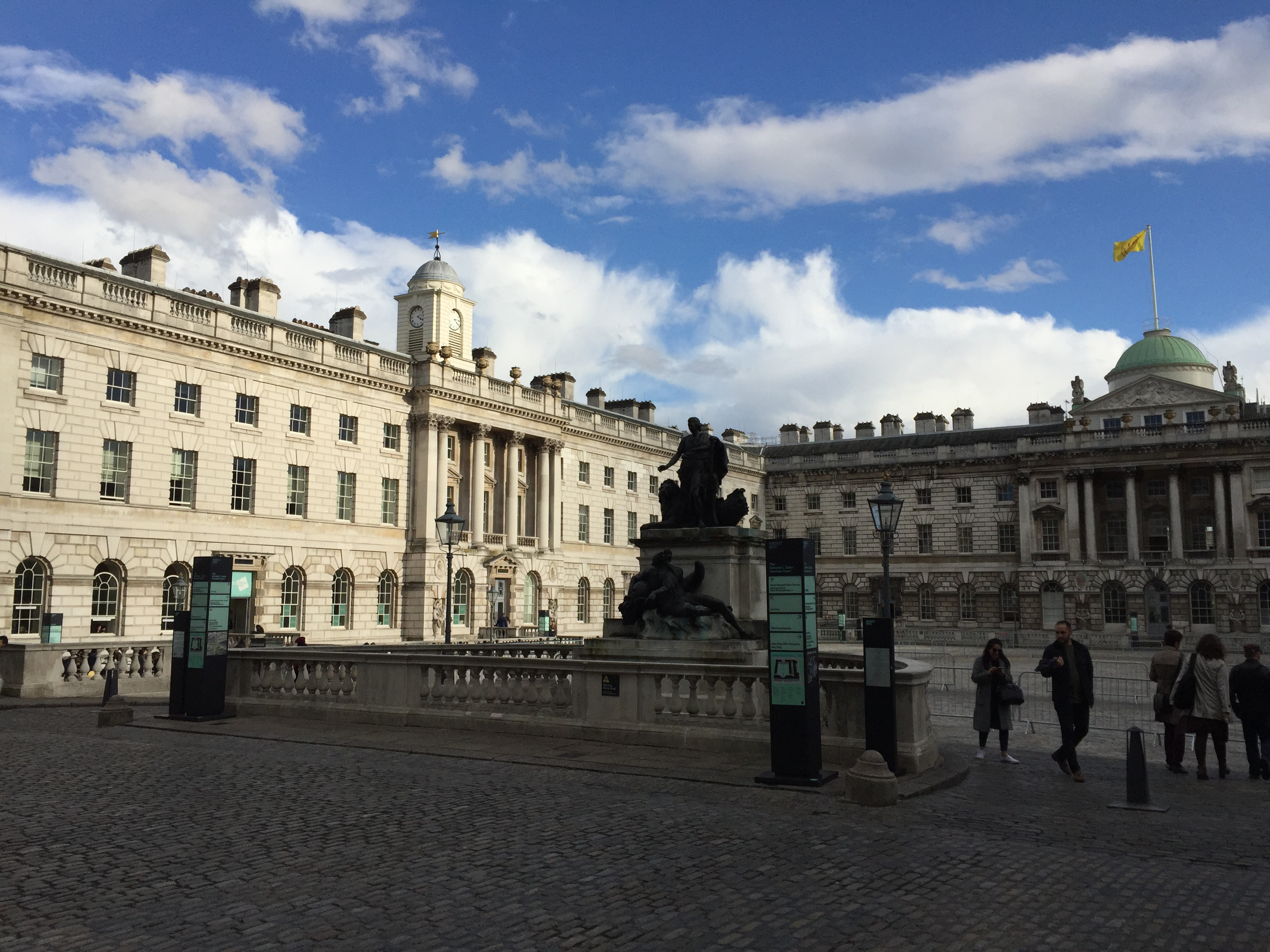
Somerset House, home to the King's Cultural Institute and the School of Law

In December 2009, King's signed a 78-year lease to the East Wing of Somerset House. It has been described as one of the longest-ever property negotiations, taking over 180 years to complete. Since King's was built it has been in various discussions to expand into one of the wings of Somerset House itself; however, the relationship between King's and HM Revenue and Customs that occupied the East Wing were sometimes difficult. Sir Robert Smirke's design of King's was sympathetic to that of Somerset House which is situated adjacent to the Strand Campus. A condition of King's acquiring the site in the 1820s was that it should be erected "on a plan which would complete the river front of Somerset House at its eastern extremity in accordance with the original design of Sir William Chambers" which had for so long offended "every eye of taste for its incomplete appearance".

In 1875, a dispute arose when new windows were added to the façade overlooking King's. Following a complaint by King's College London council at the loss of privacy, the response of the Metropolitan Board of Works was that "the terms under which the college is held are not such as to enable the council to restrict Her Majesty from opening windows in Somerset House whenever she may think proper". By the end of World War I, King's began to outgrow its premises which led to rekindled efforts to acquire the East Wing. There was even a suggestion that King's should be relocated to new premises in Bloomsbury to alleviate space concerns; however, these plans never came to fruition. Instead, a new top floor was added to the King's Building to house the Anatomy Department and other buildings along Surrey Street were purchased.

Following the publication of the Robbins Report on Higher Education in 1963 a further attempt was made to acquire the East Wing. The report recommended a large expansion in student numbers accommodated by a new building programme. The King's "quadrilateral plan" was to create a campus stretching from Norfolk Street in the east to Waterloo Bridge Road in the west. Plans were also drawn up for modern high-rise buildings along the Strand and Surrey Street to house a new library and laboratories. A contemporary report stated that the redevelopment would provide "London with a university precinct on the Strand of which the capital could be proud". The plans were revisited in the early 1970s by the then Principal, Sir John Hackett; however, progress was prevented by funding problems and the unwillingness of the Government to re-house its civil servants. In 1971 the Evening Standard led a public campaign for Somerset House to be transformed into a new public arts venue for London. Proposals were also aired for the relocation of the Tate Gallery to the site. In the 1990s the eventual vacation by government departments and a comprehensive restoration programme saw the opening of the Courtauld Gallery, the Gilbert and Hermitage collections and the Edmond J. Safra Fountain Court.

In early 2010 a £25 million renovation of the East Wing was undertaken and took 18 months to complete. On 29 February 2012, Queen Elizabeth II officially opened the building. It is home to the School of Law, a public exhibition space called the Inigo Rooms curated by the King's Cultural Institute as well as adding a further entrance to the Strand Campus.

=== Bush House ===
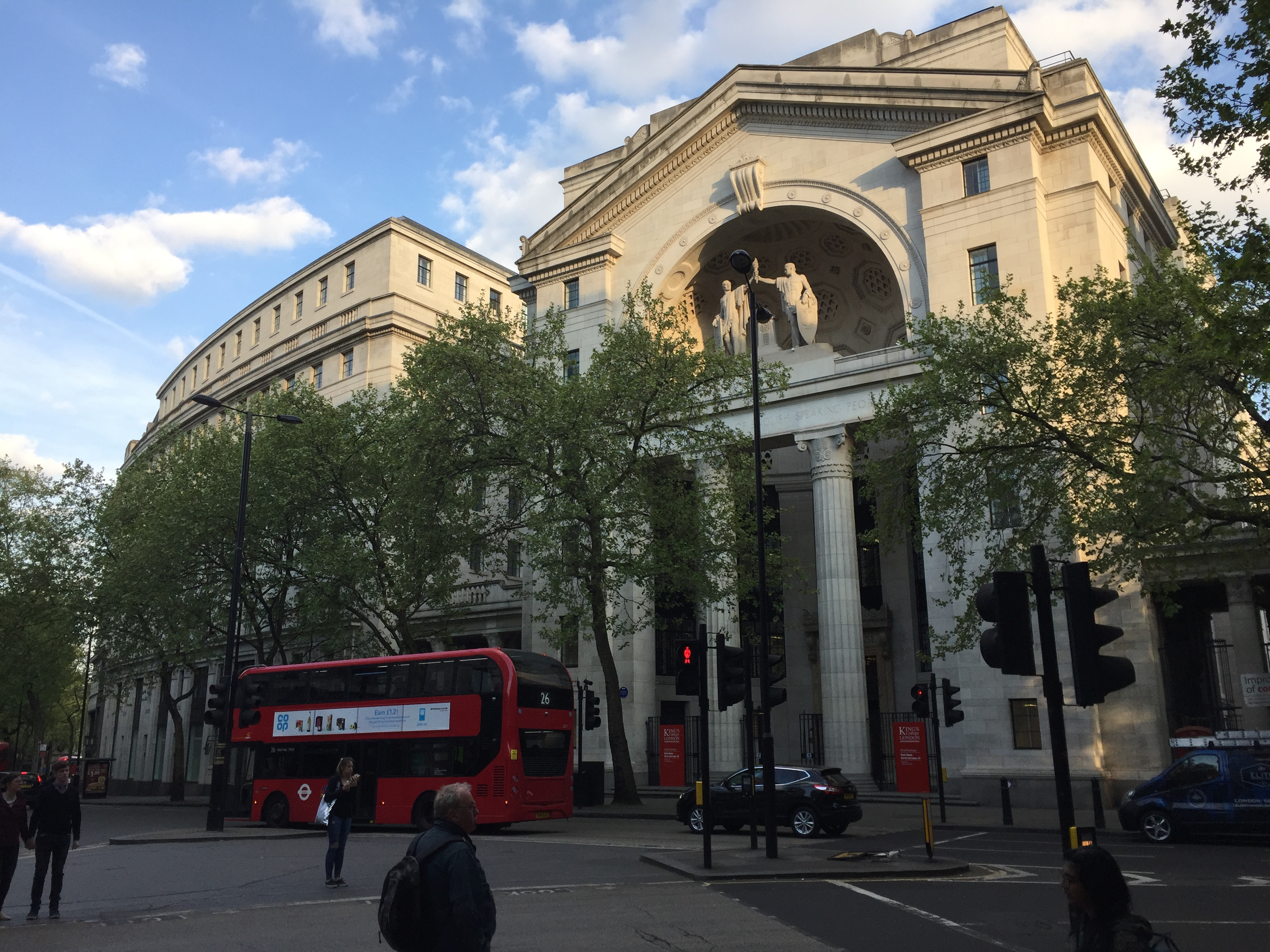
Bush House, part of the Aldwych Quarter and previous headquarters of BBC World Service

Previously the headquarters of BBC World Service, King's began occupying Bush House in September 2016 with full occupation completed in 2017. The site provides expanded accommodation to the Faculty of Social Science & Public Policy; Department of Informatics; English Language Centre; Entrepreneurship Institute; and core Student Services functions. It houses new facilities for the students' union, and the King's Business School.

=== Strand Lane 'Roman bath' ===
A Stuart cistern and later eighteenth century public bath protected by the National Trust and popularly known as the 'Roman bath' is situated on the site of the Strand Campus beneath the Norfolk Building and can be accessed via the Surrey Street entrance. Hidden by surrounding King's buildings, the bath was widely thought to be of Roman origin giving its popular name; however, it is more likely that it was originally a cistern for a fountain built in the gardens of Somerset House for Queen Anne of Denmark in 1612. Evidence of its first use as a public bath was in the late eighteenth century. The 'Roman bath' is mentioned by Charles Dickens in chapters thirty-five and thirty-six of the novel David Copperfield.

There was an old Roman bath in those days at the bottom of one of the streets out of the Strand—it may be there still—in which I have had many a cold plunge. Dressing myself as quietly as I could, and leaving Peggotty to look after my aunt, I tumbled head foremost into it, and then went for a walk to Hampstead.

— Extract from Chapter 35, David Copperfield by Charles Dickens

Moreover, part of Aldwych tube station, a well-preserved but disused London Underground station, is utilised as part of the campus. A 20m rifle range, used by King's College London Rifle and Pistol Club was constructed in the 1920s on the leased site of the disused second platform and tunnel of the station, which were taken out of service during the First World War, and the range remains in use, despite the closure of the station as part of the network in 1994.
