= Choir of King's College London =

Collegiate choir

- Choir
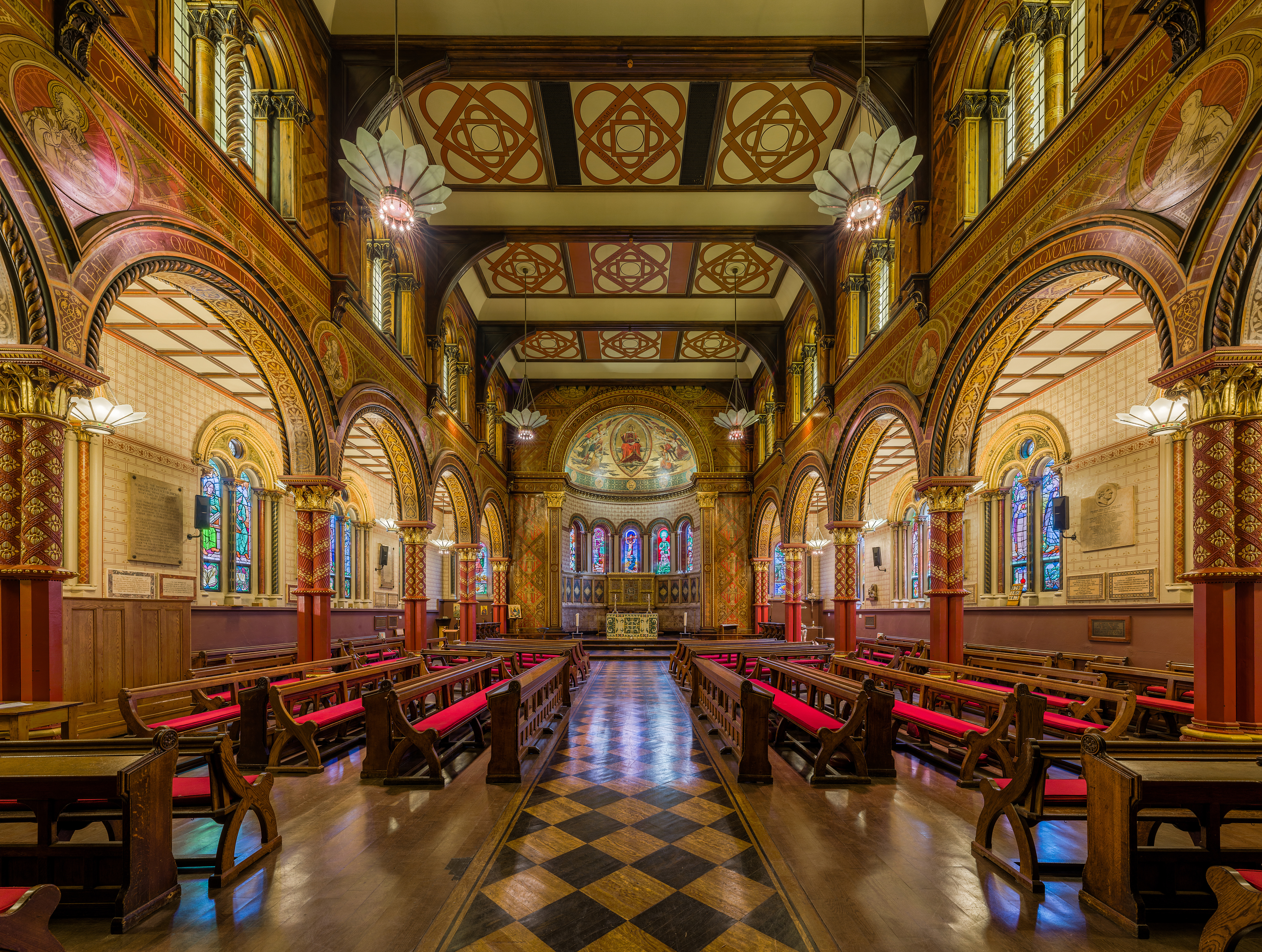
- King's College London Chapel
- Founded: c. 1843
- Founder: William Henry Monk
- Genre: Choir
- Members: 25-30 choral scholars; 1 organ scholar
- Music director: Joseph Fort
- Associated groups: The Strand Consort
- Website: www.kcl.ac.uk/choir

The Choir of King's College London is a mixed-voice choir within British university King's College London whose primary function is to provide music in the Chapel of King's College London, a Grade I listed Renaissance Revival chapel. One of the leading university choirs in England and the wider United Kingdom, since its revival in 1945, it has gained an international reputation as one of the leading university collegiate choirs in the world.

== History ==
King's College London was founded in 1828-29 by King George IV and the Duke of Wellington in the tradition of the Church of England, and worship featured heavily in the life of the university from its foundation.

The College Chapel was one of the first parts of the university to be constructed in 1829, located on the second floor of King's Building. Keen to improve the provision of music at services, in the early 1840s the College sought to establish a choir.

Founded around 1843 by William Henry Monk, it was noted that

certain gentlemen connected with King's had... been efficiently supplying the choir.

From 1945–1952, the choir was directed by Harold Last, then to E.H. Warrell who held an extensive 38 year tenure. David Trendell was then appointed, directing the choir for 22 years. Following the sudden death of Trendell, Gareth Wilson was temporarily appointed for one year. He was succeeded by the choir's current director of music, Joseph Fort.

== Directors of Music ==
Since 1945 the choir has been conducted by the Director of Music, also appointed College Organist and Lecturer in Music.

- 1945–1952: Harold Last
- 1953–1991: E.H. Warrell
- 1992–2014: David Trendell
- 2014–2015: Gareth Wilson (acting)
- 2015–present: Joseph Fort

== Membership of the choir ==
The choir normally consists of between 25 and 30 singers, most of whom are undergraduate students reading Music at King's College London.

A choral scholar also serves as the choir's librarian who works alongside the choir administrator.

=== Organ scholar ===
The organ is played by the organ scholar who is typically also an undergraduate student. If the director of music is not present for any reason, an organ scholar takes responsibility for conducting the choir.

The organ scholar for the 2022/23 academic year is Charles Maxtone-Smith.

== Services ==
In term time, the choir usually sings in the Chapel of King's College London twice a week, providing music for the College's main acts of corporate worship:

- 5:30 p.m. on Tuesdays for Choral Evensong
- 1:10 p.m. on Wednesdays for College Eucharist

The Wednesday service of College Eucharist is often adapted to a particular theme such as Black History Month, with the Choir performing works relevant to that particular theme.

Most famed for their Advent Carols Services, the choir performs across three nights to meet demand. The choir also sings in extra services such as All Souls and Ash Wednesday Vigils, remembrance and memorial services.

Many members of the choir also sing with the neighbouring St Mary le Strand church, separately from their duties as choral scholars at King's College London.

The choir as a whole regularly sings for worship outside the university including at Westminster Abbey and St Paul's Cathedral, both located near the College's historic campus on the Strand in central London, the site of the College Chapel.

In 2020, the choir started livestreaming services on their YouTube channel as a result of the COVID-19 pandemic. Since the pandemic, the choir has continued to embrace technology and share recordings of their services on YouTube.

== Performances and recordings ==
The choir maintains a strong recording and touring schedule, having previously performed as far afield as Italy, Nigeria and Hong Kong. The choir also performs regularly in major concert venues and holds numerous appearances at music festivals across the country.

=== Tours and performances ===
Aside from sacred music sung mostly in choral evensong services, the choir also performs a wide range of music, including contemporary mass settings and choral works by Eleanor Alberga, Charles Stanford, Herbert Howells, and Imogen Holst, with the choir having recently sung the world première of Ed Nesbit's (one of the college composition lecturer's) The King's Service.

The choir often performs with symphony orchestras both within the United Kingdom and abroad, with the ensemble giving the world première of Simon Rowland-Jones's Smile, O voluptuous cool-breath’d Earth! alongside the Orion Orchestra in November 2020. In April 2021 the choir performed the St John Passion with the Hanover Band, with other performing engagements including multiple concerts featuring the Rachmaninoff All-Night Vigil as part of the Barnes Music Festival and at St John's Smith Square.

Tours in recent years have seen the choir perform in China (2024), Wales (2023), the US (2019), Nigeria (2018), US and Canada (2017), Germany (2016), and Italy (2015).

=== Recordings ===
External audio
- You may listen to the Choir of King's College London conducted by Joseph Fort performing the conductor's own chamber arrangement of Gustav Holst's The Cloud Messenger in 2019 on classicalmusicsentinel.com

Since 2009, the choir has primarily recorded a number of critically acclaimed recordings with Delphian. Repertory ranges from more traditional Anglican worship music including music from Byrd and Palestrina to premièring the works of contemporary composers such as Kerensa Briggs.

Under the baton of Trendell, the choir enjoyed a relationship with the Choir of Gonville and Caius College, Cambridge, where they released multiple albums together with Delphian. The choir has also worked with a number of instrumental ensembles and guest artists, most recently with Sean Shibe for the choir's release of Say it to the Still World and with the Strand Ensemble for The Cloud Messenger.

== Discography ==
Previously having worked with Hyperion, Gaudeamus and Herald AV Publications, the choir now records exclusively with Delphian.

- 2009 - Shchedrin: The Sealed Angel (DCD34067-CD)
- 2012 - Allegri: Miserere; Masses & Motets (DCD34103-CD)
- 2013 - Deutsche Motette (DCD34124-CD)
- 2014 - Desenclos: Messe de Requiem, Salve Regina, Motets (DCD34136-CD)
- 2016 - In Memoriam - A Tribute to David Trendell (DCD34146-CD)
- 2017 - Brahms: An English Requiem (DCD34195-CD)
- 2019 - Masses for Double Choir (DCD34211-CD)
- 2019 - Advent Carols (DCD34226-CD)
- 2020 - The Cloud Messenger (DCD34241-CD)
- 2021 - Say it to the Still World (DCD34246-CD)
- 2022 - Edward Nesbit: Sacred Choral Music (DCD34256)
- 2023 - Rachmaninoff: Vespers - All-Night Vigil (DCD34296)

Some previous recordings include:

- 2000 - John Tavener and William Byrd
- 2002 - Alonso Lobo: Choral Music (CDGAU311)
- 2003 - O Sapientia: Advent from King's College London (HAVP296)

== Awards and nominations ==
Year	Award and category		Work	Result	Notes
2001	Gramophone	Early Music Award	John Tavener and William Byrd	Nominated	
2016	Gramophone	Editor's Choice	In Memoriam - A Tribute to David Trendell		
2022	Gramophone	Editor's Choice	Edward Nesbit: Sacred Choral Music		
