= Jim Pallas =

American sculptor

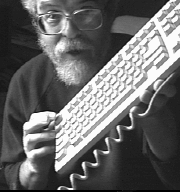
- Born: 1941 (age 84–85); Detroit, Michigan, United States
- Known for: Kinetic art
- Notable work: Art Giants of Detroit (2012), Hitchhikers in the Valley of Heart's Delight (2006), The Senate Piece(1983), Century of Light (1980)

Jim Pallas (born 1941) is an American sculptor known for his electro-kinetic sculptures. "Zany, surrealistic, and ingenious in their construction, Mr. Pallas' work ushers us into the gaudy baroque phrase of kinetic art, as emanations of Paul Klee's Twittering Machines come back to haunt us in the language of our bizarre technology." Pallas is one of the pioneers in electronic art. Detroit Art Critic, Joy Colby once described Pallas as having the "tinkering genius of Henry Ford combined with the ironic wit of Marcel Duchamp."

== Early life and education ==
Born in 1941 in Detroit, Michigan to parents from Kentucky, he graduated from high school in 1959 and moved to the downtown Detroit area known as the Cass Corridor. He began his working career as a guide at the Detroit Institute of Arts, a job that afforded him the opportunity to explore the vast collection of that museum. He married Janet Laur in 1962. He joined the faculty at Macomb County Community College in 1965. Although he began in the traditional medium of welded metal sculpture, he soon began to make sculptures that move and respond to their environment. Throughout the 1960s and 1970s, Pallas was a pioneer in [kinetic art] using electronics and early computer technology to enable his sculptures to respond to external stimuli. Often the circuit boards specifically designed for a particular piece were, themselves, drawings.

== Major installations and exhibitions ==
Major installations of his work have appeared in museums and science centers around the globe, including the Ontario Science Centre (Canadian Worm Colony, 1984) and the Detroit Institute of Arts (North Court Tube Dance, 1978).

His exhibitions include: Art Giants of Detroit, N'Namdi Center for Contemporary Art 2012; Carry Me Back, Game Show, Columbia U. Commission, NYC 2011; Hitch Hiking Pioneers in the Valley of the Heart's Delight, San Jose, CA. 2006; The Impact of Ylem:20 Years of Art Science and Technology, San Francisco, Ca. 2001; Cybermonde, Cite des Arts et des Nouvelle Technologies, Montreal, Quebec, Canada, 1997; Automates et Robots, Centre National Art et Technologie, Reims, France, 1992; Motor City Review, Zacateca, Mexico, 1989; Computers and Art, Everson Museum, Syracuse, N.Y., 1987. and IBM Gallery of Science and Art, N.Y., 1988. and Contemporary Art Center, Cincinnati, OH, 1988; "Canadian Worm Colony", The Artist as a Young Machine, Ontario Science Centre, Toronto, Ontario, Canada 1984; Hanumura Gallery, Detroit, 1963.

== Notable works and collections ==
=== Firefly ===
Currently in the collection of the Detroit Institute of Arts, Firefly: Portrait of the Artist with Cosmic Bubble, is often on display in the Museum's contemporary art gallery.

=== Century of Light ===
Century of Light (1980) was located in downtown Detroit on Washington Boulevard at Grand River Avenue. Commissioned to celebrate the 100th anniversary of the lightbulb by Thomas Edison, the piece consisted of an 18-foot diameter mandala of 144 one foot diameter light spheres suspended in the air and a computer console called PROGMOD. The mandala displayed the animated patterns generated in response to the movements of people around it using micro-wave radar and a photocell. The PROGMOD processed the inputs and generated the patterns for display on the mandala. It was the first use of a microcomputer in a large permanent outdoor public sculpture. The Century of Light was installed in 1980 and continuously operated until it was destroyed in a bungled move by the City of Detroit in 2006.

=== The Senate Piece ===
Commissioned by U.S. Senator Carl Levin The Senate Piece responds to the proceedings taking place on the floor of the U.S. Senate as well as to activities in the immediate surroundings of the piece. When installed, the idea of a sculpture "listening" to the conversations occurring in the senator's office created some controversy.

=== Hitchhikers ===
In the 1970s, Pallas began making life-size plywood cut-outs of real people and gave them to those subjects to write something, anything, on the back and abandon them in a public place. The subjects would often write a destination telling those who stopped where the realistic looking "hitchhikers" were trying to go. In 2006, collaborating with artists Julie Newdoll and Mike Mosher, Pallas created "Hitchhikers in the Valley of Heart's Delight" as part of the art, technology and science festival sponsored by ISEA International called the Zero One Festival. The hitchhikers were embedded with trackers and their whereabouts published on the web. Two of the six hitchhikers were of Hewlett-Packard co-founders, Bill Hewlett and David Packard. The note on the back of the plywood cut-outs asked that they be taken finally to the HP Corporate headquarters. When they arrived, however, they were turned away. Sun Microsystems stepped in and purchased Hewlett & Packard and put them back "on the street." The trio of artists created a travelogue that allowed anyone who participated in the project, by picking up the hitchhikers on the side of the road and taking them further in the journey to document that portion of the trip and were rewarded with a share of ownership in the artwork. In 2011, Pallas was commissioned by Columbia University to place tracker equipped Hitchikers of Saul Steinberg, Thelonious Monk and a woman of the Lenape tribe on locations in Manhattan as part of an Artists' Game exhibit. All were stolen within 24 hours.

=== Art Giants of Detroit ===
In 2012 Pallas created a series of portraits of sixteen people who left an indelible stamp on the youngest generation of artists in Detroit. The four foot by four foot portraits are on large foamy surfaces hardened by layers of pigmented epoxy. An exhibition of all sixteen portraits at the N'Namdi Center for Contemporary Art Artist pays homage to Detroit's most influential artists was highlighted in the July 2012 PBS Newshour show Where Detroit Industry Has Floundered, World-Class Art Scene Flourishes.

=== Vincent van Gogh ===
A giant head of Vincent van Gogh, evoking van Gogh's Self-portrait with Straw Hat, stands seven feet tall on its pedestal. In the sculpture his right ear is missing, but his left ear has a large enough opening that money can be dropped into the head. When money is deposited into the ear, the sculpture responds with Dutch accented audio recordings of observations about life and art. Made of pigmented epoxy fiberglass over a steel frame. The piece is currently in the collection of the Detroit Institute of Arts. Pallas has completed other works inspired by van Gogh's paintings.

== Honors and awards ==
His honors and awards include: Creative Artist Award, Michigan Foundation for the Arts, 1980; Honorary Mention, Prix Ars Electronica, Linz, Austria, 1992; Polk Art and Technology Award, Birmingham, Michigan, 2001.

== Feature films ==
Jim Pallas: Electronic Sculptor is a documentary produced by Academy Award-winning Sue Marx Films. The film won both an EMMY Award and CINE Golden Eagle and was an American Film Festival Finalist.

== Notable quotes ==
"The enemy of art is often the janitor."
