= Taş =

Taş is a Turkish word meaning stone, often used as a surname, it may refer to:

== People ==
- Asya Nur Taş (born 1994), Turkish individual and group rhythmic gymnast
- Atilla Taş (born 1975), Turkish singer
- Ayşe Taş (born 1987), Turkish female boxer
- Aysel Taş (born 1964), Bulgarian born Turkish female javelin thrower
- Coşkun Taş (1935–2024), Turkish footballer
- Didem Taş (born 1992), Turkish women's footballer
- Erol Taş (1928–1998), Turkish actor
- Mehmet Taş (born 1991), Turkish footballer
- Nizamettin Taş (born 1961), Turkish military commander of Kurdish separatist organization PKK
- Yakup Taş (1959–2023), Turkish politician

== See also ==
- TAS/Tas
