= Chapel of King's College London =

Chapel in London, England

The Chapel of King's College London
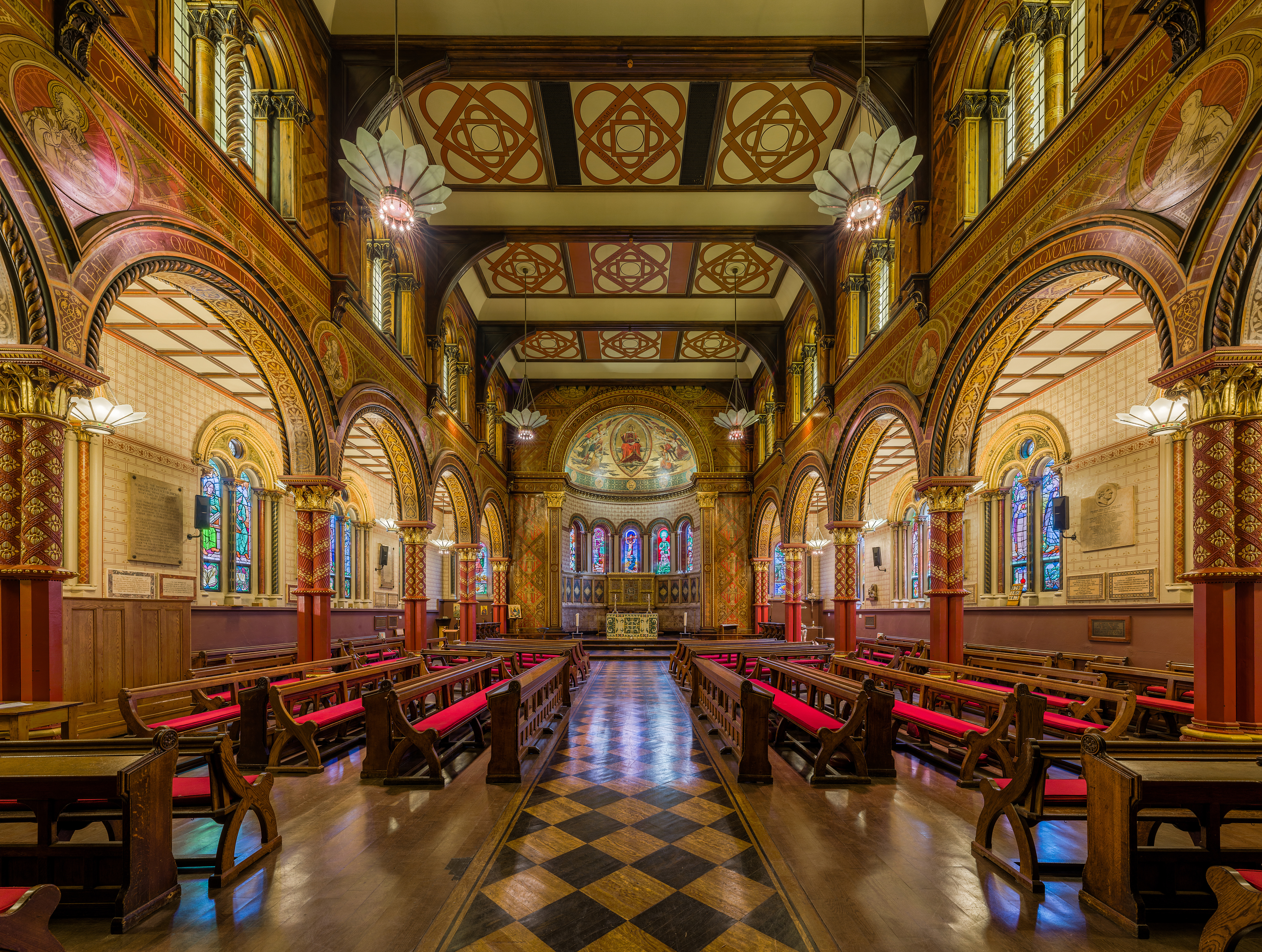
- The Grade I listed college chapel on the Strand Campus seen today was redesigned in 1864 by Sir George Gilbert Scott

Religion
- Status: Active

Location
- Location: King's College London, Strand, London
- Interactive map of The Chapel of King's College London
- Coordinates: 51.51187°N 0.11506°W

Architecture
- Type: Chapel
- Completed: 1831 - Sir Robert Smirke; 1864 - Sir George Gilbert Scott

The Chapel of King's College London is a Grade I listed 19th-century chapel located in the Strand Campus of King's College, London, England. Originally designed by Sir Robert Smirke in 1831, the Renaissance Revival chapel seen today was redesigned by the prominent Victorian Gothic architect Sir George Gilbert Scott in 1864.

== History ==
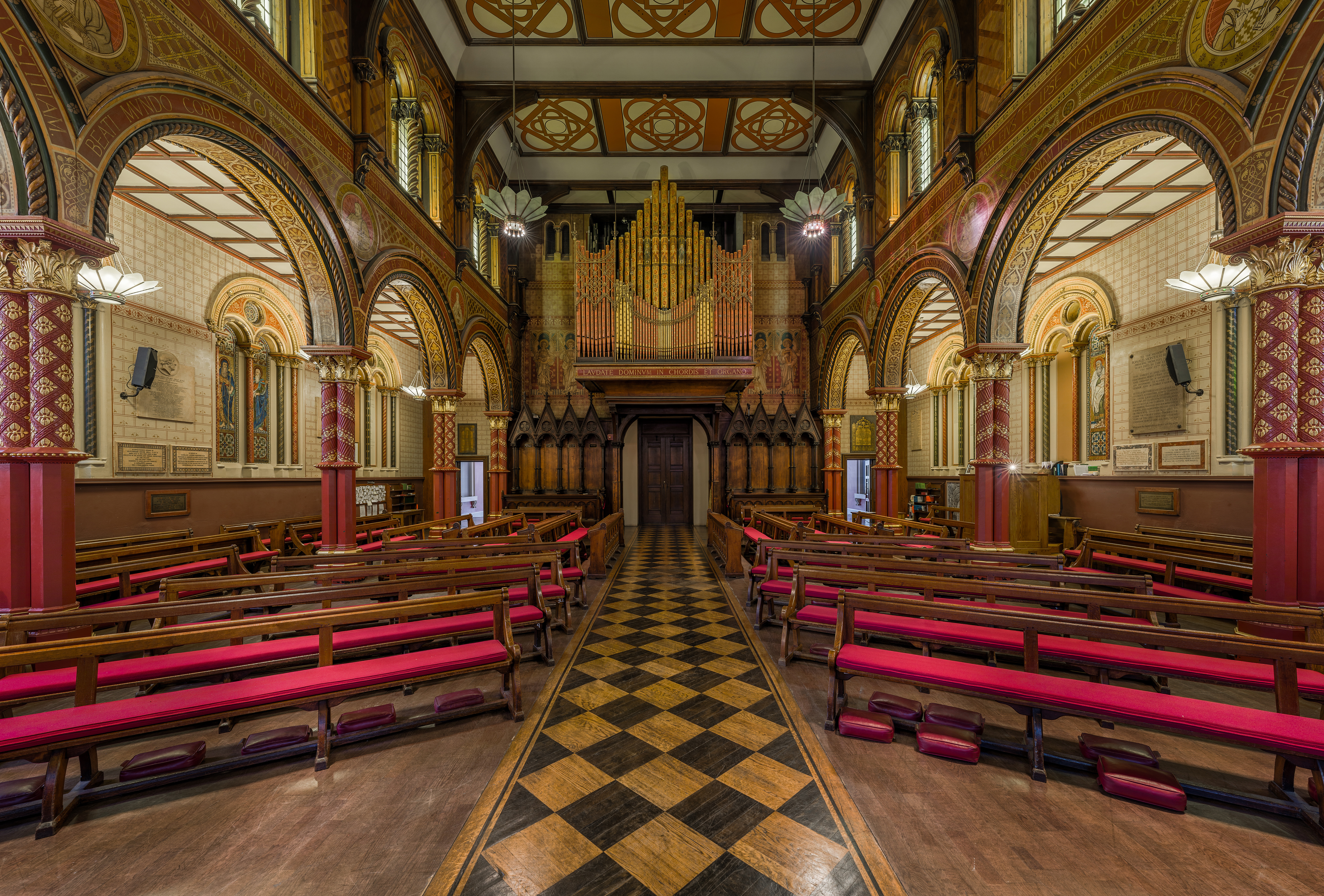
The view facing the organ from the apse

The original college chapel was designed by Sir Robert Smirke and was completed in 1831 as part of the College building (later known as the King's building). Given the foundation of the university in the tradition of the Church of England, the chapel was intended to be an integral part of the campus. This is reflected in its central location within the King's Building on the first floor above the Great Hall, accessible via a grand double staircase from the foyer. Although no pictures have survived, the original chapel was described as a low and broad room "fitted to the ecclesiological notions of George IV's reign." However, by the mid-nineteenth century its style had fallen out of fashion and in 1859 a proposal by the college chaplain E. H. Plumptre that the original chapel should be reconstructed was approved by the college council, who agreed that its "meagreness and poverty" made it unworthy of King's.

The college approached Sir George Gilbert Scott to make proposals. In his proposal of 22 December 1859, he suggested that, "There can be no doubt that, in a classic building, the best mode of giving ecclesiastical character is the adoption of the form and, in some degree, the character of an ancient basilica." His proposals for a chapel modelled on the lines of a classical basilica were accepted and the reconstruction was completed in 1864 at a cost of just over £7,000.

=== 19th and 20th century ===
Scott had to overcome several structural difficulties since the chapel was situated above the Great Hall in the 19th century. He used a lightweight construction system for the arcade and upper nave walls.

In the 20th century, there were many developments that changed the design of the chapel. The original pitched roof designed by Scott was covered with canvas decorated in bays with large star motifs, but these were lost when the ceiling was substituted in the 1930s. The low level windows, which were embellished with stained glass, were damaged during the Second World War. The architect Stephen Dykes Bower was asked to produce proposals for the chapel in 1948 following war damage. Under his direction, the windows were glazed with tinted cathedral glass instead of stained glass. The arcade columns, original designs on the aisle and apse walls were repainted.

=== 21st century ===
It was desired by the chaplaincy team of the college to have a chapel that is "sensitive to the tradition and relevant to the contemporary culture". The chapel was planned to be restored and refurbished from 1996 but was not restored until 2001.

== Apse ==
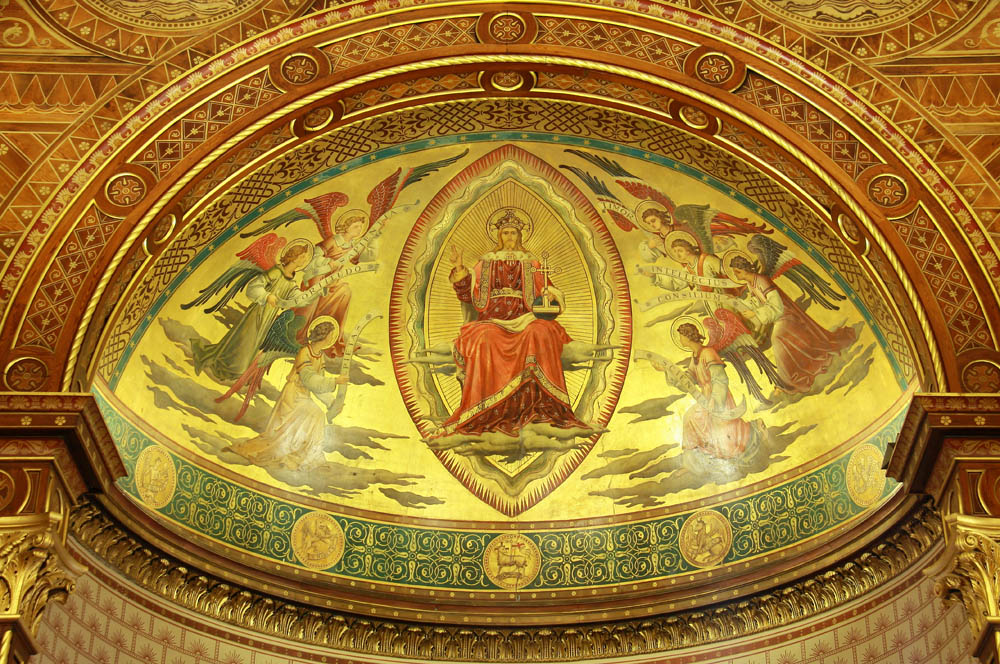
Apse roof, depicting Christ in Majesty surrounded by angels

The semi-dome of the apse is a copy of one of Salviati's mosaics, depicting Christ in Majesty surrounded by angels. Either side of the arch are elaborately decorated vertical panels which include figures bearing scrolls inscribed with the motto of King's College, Sancte et Sapienter (With Holiness and Wisdom), and other Christian inscriptions. The spandrels of the arches on each side of the nave feature the painted heads Doctors of the Church, and four 16th- and 17th-century Anglican Divines. These appear to have been an afterthought, as they do not feature in the original Gilbert Scott drawings.

== Organists ==
The following is a list of organists of the chapel:

- 1835: Henry Bevington
- 1854: William Henry Monk (director of the choir from 1849)
- 1889: John Edward Wernham (joined the college staff in 1886)
- 1916: vacancy (organ played by students under the supervision of the Department of Theology)
- 1937: Robert Linton Shields (officially appointed lecturer in music, as were all subsequent organists until 1980)
- 1941: vacant
- 1945: Harold Last
- 1953: Ernest H. Warrell
- 1992: David Trendell
- 2014: Gareth Wilson
- 2015: Joseph Fort

== Bibliography ==
- Huelin, Gordon (1979). King's College London, the Chapel (PDF). King's College London. Archived from the original (PDF) on 21 June 2013.
- "A brief history of the Chapel" (PDF). King's College London. Archived from the original (PDF) on 20 June 2013.
