= Reginald Alec Martin =

British writer

- Born: 11 January 1908; South London, England
- Died: 27 June 1971 (aged 63); Haywards Heath, Sussex, England
- Occupation: Author
- Writing career
- Pen name: E. C. Eliott; Rex Dixon; Robert Martin; Scott Martin; Hank McCoy; Burt Merrill; Brett Cameron; Buck Savage; Tex Bancroft; Rafe Bernard; Simon Latter; Nicholas Marrat; Frank Denver
- Language: English
- Years active: 1949–1967
- Genres: Westerns, Science fiction

Reginald Alec Martin (11 January 1908 – 27 June 1971) was a British author of a children's series and other novels. He wrote under a series of pseudonyms, including E. C. Eliott and Rex Dixon.

== Career ==
Martin was born in South London in 1908. He claimed to have started work at 13, and spent time in various countries, working as a cowboy, gold prospector, and wild-horse trader, among numerous other occupations. During the Second World War he lived in Nottingham, working for the Ambulance Service.

He began writing full-time after the war, publishing his first novel in 1949 under the name "Hank McCoy". He went on to write more novels, all Westerns, over the next few years under the names "Scott Martin", "Tex Bancroft", "Brett Cameron", "Buck Savage" and "Burt Merrill", and also a science fiction novel The Wheel in the Sky, published in 1954, under the name "Rafe Barnard". In 1953 he began writing novels for children, starting with the "Pocomoto" series of westerns as "Rex Dixon", then the "Kemlo" science fiction series as "E. C. Eliott", and the "Joey" and "Dance and Co." adventure series as "Robert Martin". He also wrote spin-off novels, short stories, non-fiction books, and ghost-wrote several novels published under the names of well-known sportsmen.

He died in Haywards Heath, Sussex, in 1971.

== Bibliography ==
=== As "Hank McCoy" ===
- Killers of Red Canyon (Werner Laurie, 1949)
- Guns Across the Sholto (Werner Laurie, 1950)
- Riders of Reckless Gold (Werner Laurie, 1950)
- Savage City (Werner Laurie, 1951)
- Sonora Trail (Werner Laurie, 1951)
- The Hides of Texas (Werner Laurie, 1952)
- Wild Horse Range (Werner Laurie, 1952)
- Blood on the Pecos (Werner Laurie, 1953)

=== As "Buck Savage" ===
- Lariats of Death (Forbes Robertson, 1950)
- Riders of the Renegade (Forbes Robertson, 1951)
- Destiny Trail (Forbes Robertson, 1951)
- Herds of Lampasa (Forbes Robertson, 1952)
- The Pecos Plainsman (Forbes Robertson, 1953)
- Call of the Canyon (Forbes Robertson, 1953)

=== As "Brett Cameron" ===
The Blue Sombrero stories

- The Blue Sombrero (Werner Laurie, 1951)
- The Laughing Guns (Werner Laurie, 1952)
- The Cautious Caballero (Werner Laurie, 1952)
- The Guns of San Rosala (Werner Laurie, 1952)

=== As "Burt Merrill" ===
- Vengeance Trail (Forbes Robertson, 1951)
- Guns of Delta City (Forbes Robertson, 1952)

=== As "Scott Martin" ===
- The Claws of the Cougar (Werner Laurie, 1951)

=== As "Tex Bancroft" ===
- Gold Horse Canyon (Herbert Jenkins, 1952)
- The Prairie Dusters (Herbert Jenkins, 1953)

=== As "Rex Dixon" ===
The Pocomoto stories

- Pocomoto - Pony Express Rider (Nelson, 1953)
- Pocomoto - Tenderfoot (Nelson, 1953)
- Pocomoto - Bronco Buster (Nelson, 1953)
- Pocomoto and the Night Riders (Nelson, 1953)
- Pocomoto and the Canyon Treasure (Nelson, 1954)
- Pocomoto - Brush Popper (Nelson, 1954)
- Pocomoto and the Li'l Fella (Nelson, 1954)
- Pocomoto - Buffalo Hunter (Nelson, 1954)
- Pocomoto - Cowboy Cavalier (Nelson, 1955)
- Pocomoto and the Lazy River (Nelson, 1955)
- Pocomoto and the Snow Wolf (Nelson, 1955)
- Pocomoto and the Indian Trails (Nelson, 1956)
- Pocomoto and the Robbers' Trail (Nelson, 1956)
- Pocomoto and the Spanish Steed (Nelson, 1957)
- Pocomoto and the Desert Gold (Nelson, 1957)
- Pocomoto and the Circus Folk (Nelson, 1957)
- Pocomoto and the Texas Pioneers (Nelson, 1958)
- Pocomoto and the Lazy Sheriff (Nelson, 1958)
- Pocomoto and the Lost Hunters (Nelson, 1959)
- "Pocomoto and the Wild Horse" in Swift Annual No.6 (Hulton Press, 1959)
- Pocomoto and the Golden Herd (Nelson, 1960)
- Pocomoto and the Texas Ranger (Nelson, 1960)
- Pocomoto and the Warrior Braves (Nelson, 1961)
- "Just Lucky" in Swift Annual No.8 (Longacre Press, 1962)
- Pocomoto and the Mexican Bandits (Nelson, 1963)
- "The Mustang" in Swift Annual 1963 (Longacre Press, 1963)

The Pete stories

- Pete of the Wild Grass Country (Nelson, 1954)
- Pete and the Prairie People (Nelson, 1954)

also

- A Book of Pirates (Nelson, 1962)
- A Book of Highwaymen (Nelson, 1963)
- "The Wild Ones" in Boys Choice (Golden Pleasure Books, 1965)

=== As "Robert Martin" ===
The Joey stories

Joey is a boy living in the Covent Garden area of London with his dad Smitty and his Aunt Clara. He is the leader of the Jasmine Street gang and has adventures solving various crimes.

- Joey of Jasmine Street (Nelson, 1954)
- Joey and the River Pirates (Nelson, 1954)
- Joey and the Mail Robbers (Nelson, 1955)
- Joey and the Blackbird Gang (Nelson, 1956)
- Joey and the Helicopter (Nelson, 1956)
- Joey and the Magic Eye (Nelson, 1956)
- Joey and the Square of Gold (Nelson, 1957)
- Joey and the City Ghosts (Nelson, 1957)
- Joey and the Squib (Nelson, 1957)
- Joey and the Royalist Treasure (Nelson, 1957)
- Joey: Soap Box Driver (Nelson, 1958)
- Joey and the Smugglers' Legend (Nelson, 1958)
- Joey and the Magic Pony (Nelson, 1958)
- Joey and the Secret Engine (Nelson, 1960)
- Joey and the Master Plan (Nelson, 1961)
- Joey and the Detectives (Nelson, 1963)
- Joey and the Magician (Nelson, 1963)
- Joey and the Pickpocket (Nelson, 1964)
- Joey and the Train Robbers (Nelson, 1965)

The Ginger Pennylove stories

- Gangster Pie (Hutchinson, 1958)
- The Laughing Carpenter (Hutchinson, 1958)
- The Born Mechanic (Hutchinson, 1959)
- The Chinese Box (Hutchinson, 1960)

The Dance & Co. series

- The Mystery of the Car Bandits (Nelson, 1958)
- The Mystery of the Golden Skulls (Nelson, 1958)
- The Mystery of the Long Shadow (Nelson, 1958)
- The Mystery of the Friendly Forger (Nelson, 1958)
- The Mystery of the Bullion Robbery (Nelson, 1960)
- The Mystery of the TV Crooks (Nelson, 1960)
- The Mystery of the Motorway (Nelson, 1961)
- The Mystery of the Poisoned Puppet (Nelson, 1962)
- The Mystery of the Pay-Snatchers (Nelson, 1963)
- The Mystery of the Missing Passenger (Nelson, 1964)

The Career stories

- The October Story (Harrap, 1959)
- The April Story (Harrap, 1960)
- The September Story (Harrap, 1960)

The Bandit stories

- Tony and the Champ (Ernest Benn, 1963)
- Tony and the Secret Money (Ernest Benn, 1964)
- Killer Road (Ernest Benn, 1964)
- Art and the Sounders (Ernest Benn, 1964)

The Trew Twins stories

- The Gold Elephant (Brockhampton Press, 1959)
- The Money Mystery (Brockhampton Press, 1960)
- The Secret Boat (Brockhampton Press, 1961)

also

- The Golden Wheels (Harrap, 1961)
- The Circus Marches (Illustrated by Dame Laura Knight; Harrap, 1963)
- "Toddy Proves his Point" in Boys Choice (Golden Pleasure Books, 1965)

Non-Fiction

- Personna Year Book of Sports No 1 (Pelham Books, 1969)

=== As "E. C. Eliott" ===
The Kemlo stories

- Kemlo and the Crazy Planet (Nelson, 1954)
- Kemlo and the Zones of Silence (Nelson, 1954)
- Kemlo and the Sky Horse (Nelson, 1954)
- Kemlo and the Martian Ghosts (Nelson, 1955)
- Kemlo and the Craters of the Moon (Nelson, 1955)
- Kemlo and the Space Lanes (Nelson, 1955)
- Kemlo and the Star Men (Nelson, 1955)
- Kemlo and the Gravity Rays (Nelson, 1956)
- Kemlo and the End of Time (Nelson, 1957)
- Kemlo and the Purple Dawn (Nelson, 1957)
- Kemlo and the Zombie Men (Nelson, 1958)
- Kemlo and the Space Men (Nelson, 1959)
- Kemlo and the Satellite Builders (Nelson, 1960)
- Kemlo and the Space Invaders (Nelson, 1961)
- Kemlo and the Masters of Space (Nelson, 1963)

The Tas stories

- Tas and the Postal Rocket (Nelson, 1955)
- Tas and the Space Machine (Nelson, 1955)

=== As "Rafe Bernard" ===
- The Wheel in the Sky (Ward Lock, 1954)
- The Halo Highway: A Story of The Invaders (Souvenir Press, 1967), published in the US by Pyramid Books as The Invaders #3: Army of the Undead

=== As "Frank Denver" ===
- Okara the Hunter (Nelson, 1955)

The Daktari stories

- The Pintu Dogs (Souvenir Press, 1967)
- The Happy Hippo (Souvenir Press, 1967)

=== As "Nicholas Marrat" ===
- In A Book of Boys' Stories (Golden Pleasure Books, 1964)
  - "Boy with a Gun"
  - "Chad Stenson - T.V. Reporter"
  - "Imperno Quartaro - Special Agent"
  - "Murder is for Men"
  - "The Explosive Twins"
  - "The Fighting Flanagans"
  - "The Planetoid Grid"
- "Imperno Strikes Again" in Boys Choice (Golden Pleasure Books, 1965)

=== As "Simon Latter" ===
The Girl from U.N.C.L.E. stories

- The Global Globules Affair (Souvenir Press, 1967)
- The Golden Boats of Taradata Affair (Souvenir Press, 1967)

=== Co-author ===
- Cricket Crusader, Gary Sobers and R. A. Martin (Pelham Books, 1966)

=== Ghost writer ===
- Carlotti Joins the Team, for Mike Hawthorn (Cassell, 1959)
- Carlotti Takes the Wheel, for Mike Hawthorn (Cassell, 1959)
- Bonaventure and the Flashing Blade, for Gary Sobers (Pelham Books, 1967)
- The Golden Boots, for Denis Law (Pelham Books, 1967)
- The Torella Tigers, for Graham Hill (Pelham Books, 1968)
