= The Artist's Garden =

Open-air art exhibition site in London, England

Coordinates: 51.5110°N 0.1144°W

The Artist's Garden is a free open-air art exhibition site at 1 Temple Place in London, England, on the rooftop of Temple tube station. The 1,400 square metres (15,000 sq ft) site is part of the Victoria Embankment on the north shore of the Thames.

The first exhibition on the site featured work by Lakwena Maciver. Other artists who have exhibited there include Holly Hendry, Frances Richardson, Holly Stevenson, and Annabel Tennyson-Davies.

The exhibition is open to the public without charge.
