= Pocomoto =

Character in a series of children's westerns by Rex Dixon

Pocomoto is the central character in a series of some 23 books written by the author Rex Dixon (a pseudonym for the author Reginald Alec Martin). The books are a children's western series focusing on Pocomoto's adventures.

== Books ==
1. Pocomoto-Pony Express Rider ... Illustrated by Jack Harman, Nelson 1953
2. Pocomoto-Tenderfoot ... Illustrated by Jack Harman.. Nelson 1953
3. Pocomoto-Bronco Buster ... Illustrated by Jack Harman, Nelson 1953
4. Pocomoto and the Night Riders ... Illustrated by Jack Harman, Nelson 1953
5. Pocomoto and the Canyon Treasure, Nelson 1954
6. Pocomoto-Brush Popper ... Illustrated by Jack Harman, Nelson 1954
7. Pocomoto and the Li'l Fella ... Illustrated by Jack Harman Nelson 1954
8. Pocomoto-Buffalo Hunter ... Illustrated by Jack Harman, Nelson 1954
9. Pocomoto-Cowboy Cavalier, Nelson 1955
10. Pocomoto and the Lazy River ... Illustrated by Jack Harman, Nelson 1955
11. Pocomoto and the Snow Wolf ... Illustrated by Jack Harman, Nelson, 1955
12. Pocomoto and the Indian Trails ... Illustrated by Jack Harman, Nelson, 1956
13. Pocomoto and the Robbers' Trail ... Illustrated by Jack Harman, Nelson 1956
14. Pocomoto and the Spanish Steed ... Illustrated by Eric Tansley. .Nelson 1957
15. Pocomoto and the Desert Gold ... Illustrated by Robert Hodgson. Nelson 1957
16. Pocomoto and the Circus Folk ... Illustrated by Robert Hodgson, Nelson 1957
17. Pocomoto and the Texas Pioneers ... Illustrated by Robert Hodgson, Nelson 1958
18. Pocomoto and the Lazy Sheriff ... Illustrated by Robert Hodgson, Nelson 1958
19. Pocomoto and the Lost Hunters ... Illustrated by Robert Hodgson, Nelson 1959
20. Pocomoto and the Texas Ranger ... Illustrated by Robert Hodgson, Nelson 1960.
21. Pocomoto and the Golden Herd ... Illustrated by Robert Hodgson, Nelson 1960.
22. Pocomoto and the Warrior Braves ... Illustrated by Robert Hodgson, Nelson 1961.
23. Pocomoto and the Mexican Bandits, Nelson 1963.
