= Starving artist =

Artist who focuses on their art above even their own well-being

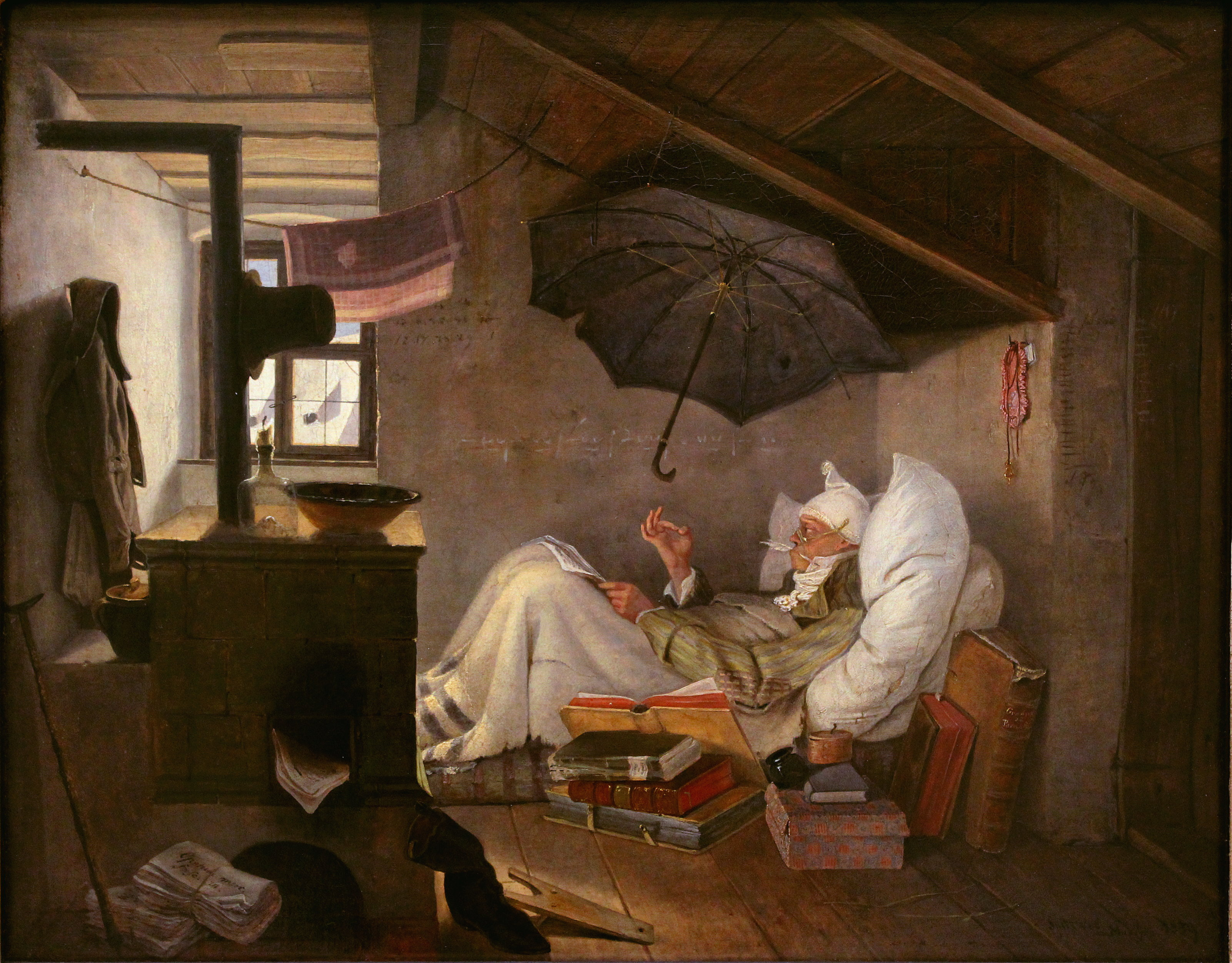
The Poor Poet by Carl Spitzweg

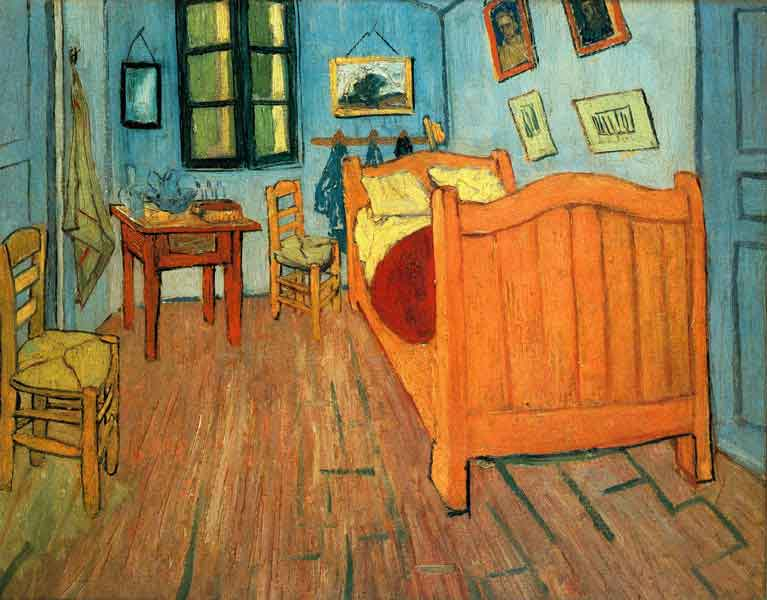
Bedroom in Arles (1888) is a visual representation of the simple living conditions under which Vincent van Gogh lived and worked.

A starving artist is one who sacrifices material well-being in order to focus on their artwork. They typically live on minimum expenses, either for a lack of business or because all their disposable income goes toward art projects. Related terms include starving actor and starving musician.

Some artists desire mainstream success but have difficulty due to high barriers to entry in fields such as the visual arts, the film industry, and theatre. These artists frequently take temporary positions such as waitering or other service industry jobs while they focus their attention on "breaking through" in their preferred field.

Other artists may find enough satisfaction in living as artists to choose voluntary poverty regardless of their prospects for future financial reward or broad recognition. Virginia Nicholson writes in Among the Bohemians: Experiments in Living 1900–1939:

Fifty years on we may judge that Dylan Thomas's poverty was noble, while Nina Hamnett's was senseless. But a minor artist with no money goes as hungry as a genius. What drove them to do it? I believe that such people were not only choosing art, they were choosing the life of the artist. Art offered them a different way of living, one that they believed more than compensated for the loss of comfort and respectability.

== Cultural depictions ==
The starving artist is a typical late 18th and early 19th-century Romantic figure featured in many paintings and works of literature. In 1851, Henri Murger wrote about four starving artists in Scènes de la Vie de Bohème, the basis for operas entitled La bohème by both Puccini and Leoncavallo. Knut Hamsun's 1890 novel Hunger featured a starving artist as the protagonist. In 1922, Franz Kafka wrote a short story called "A Hunger Artist" about a man who seeks fame for his public performances of fasting.

== See also ==
- Bohemian style
- Bohemianism
- Community arts
- Tortured artist
- The Starving Artists Project
