= Kemlo =

Series of novels by E. C. Eliott

The Kemlo books are a series of children's science fiction novels written by Reginald Alec Martin, under the pseudonym of E. C. Eliott. The first book, Kemlo and the Crazy Planet was published in 1954; the fifteenth and final book in the series, Kemlo and the Masters of Space, was published in 1963.

== Plot ==
The central character, Kemlo, was born and raised in space, on a satellite named Satellite Belt K (one of a number of similar space stations named after a letter of the alphabet). All children born on a space station were given names with the same initial, hence the names Kemlo, Kartin, Kerowski, Krillie, and so on. Kemlo is a Captain of the Space Scouts, who have their own "scooters" - small two-seat personal spacecraft for travel around and between the Satellite Belts. Kemlo, like all children born in space, breathes "plasmorgia" instead of air. This allows him to breathe in space, although it means he is unable to travel to Earth without the aid of compressed plasmorgia and "gravity rays".

== Books ==
Cover of Kemlo and the Crazy Planet', 1954, Illustration by R.J.Jobson

1. Kemlo and the Crazy Planet (1954)
2. Kemlo and the Zones of Silence (1954)
3. Kemlo and the Sky Horse (1954)
4. Kemlo and the Martian Ghosts (1955)
5. Kemlo and the Space Lanes (1955)
6. Kemlo and the Craters of the Moon (1955)
7. Kemlo and the Star Men (1955)
8. Kemlo and the Gravity Rays (1956)
9. Kemlo and the End of Time (1957)
10. Kemlo and the Purple Dawn (1957)
11. Kemlo and the Zombie Men (1958)
12. Kemlo and the Space Men (1959)
13. Kemlo and the Satellite Builders (1960)
14. Kemlo and the Space Invaders (1961)
15. Kemlo and the Masters of Space (1963)
