= Taz =

Taz or TAZ may refer to:

== Geography ==
- Taz (river), a river in western Siberia, Russia
- Taz Estuary, the estuary of the river Taz in Russia

== People ==
- Taz people, an ethnic group in Russia
  - Taz language, a form of Northeastern Mandarin spoken by the Taz people
- Taz Anderson (1938–2016), American football player
- Taz Bentley, American rock drummer
- Taz (singer), a British Indian singer
- TaZ (born 1986), nickname of Wiktor Wojtas, Polish Counter-Strike player
- Taz (wrestler) (born 1967), ring name of pro wrestler Peter Senerchia
- Taz, Rabbi David HaLevi Segal, author of Turei Zahav

== Companies ==
- Tata Ace Zip, a micro-truck built by Tata Motors in India
- Trnavské automobilové závody, a Slovak car manufacturer
- Tvornica Autobusa Zagreb, a Croatian bus and truck manufacturer

== Science ==
- TAZ zinc finger, zinc-containing domains found in several transcriptional co-activators
- TAZ, a previous symbol for the gene for muscle protein tafazzin. The current symbol in TAFAZZIN
- TAZ, a transcription regulator protein encoded by the gene WWTR1

== Video games ==
- Taz Express, 2000 video game for the Nintendo 64
- Taz (video game), for the Atari 2600

== Other uses ==
- Tasmanian Devil (Looney Tunes), a cartoon character
- Die Tageszeitung, known as taz, a German daily newspaper
- Temporary Autonomous Zone, a 1985 book by Hakim Bey
- TAZ 90 (camouflage), Swiss military camouflage
- "T.A.Z.", a song by Black Label Society from their debut album Sonic Brew
- The Adventure Zone, a comedy roleplaying podcast

== Acronyms ==
- Traffic analysis zone, a unit in transportation planning models

== See also ==
- TAS (disambiguation)
