= King's Business School =

Business school of King's College London

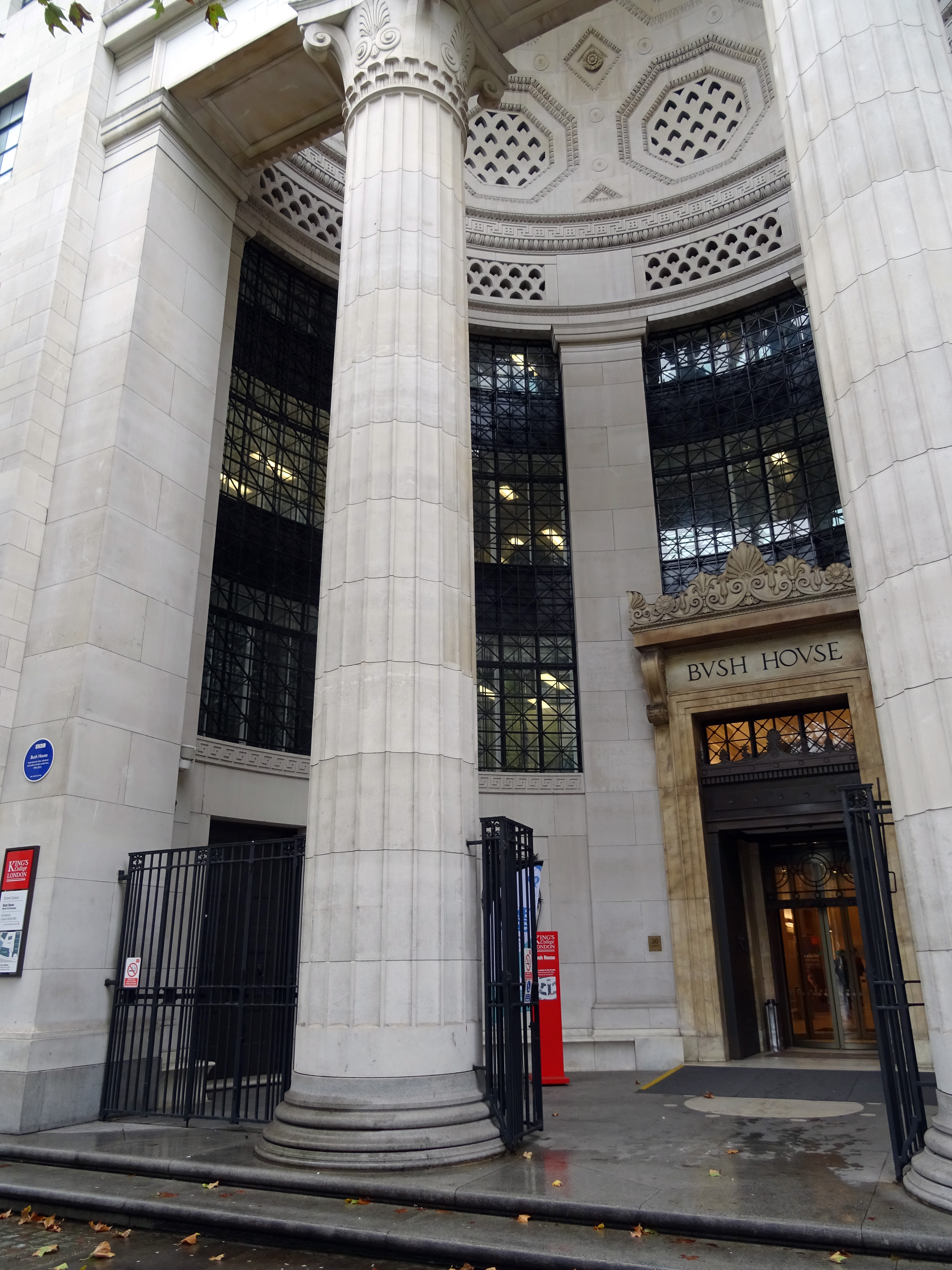
- King's Business School is based in Bush House, Aldwych in Central London.
- Former names: School of Management & Business
- Established: 1989
- Parent institution: King's College London
- Affiliations: AACSB, EQUIS, AMBA
- Chairman: Warwick Hunt
- Dean: Professor Stephen Bach
- Academic staff: 90
- Postgraduates: 800
- Location: Bush House, 30 Aldwych, London WC2B 4BG, United Kingdom, London, WC2B 4BG, United Kingdom; 51°30′47″N 0°07′03″W
- Campus: Urban
- Website: https://kcl.ac.uk/business
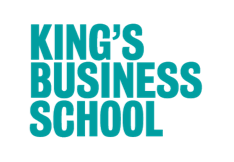

King's Business School (KBS) is the business school of King's College London located in London, the United Kingdom and is a constituent academic faculty of the university. KBS is triple accredited by the AACSB, EQUIS, and AMBA.

KBS offers undergraduate and postgraduate courses and Executive Education programmes. The undergraduate courses are classified as a Bachelor of Science (BSc) and postgraduate courses such as a Master of Science (MSc.), Postgraduate Diploma (PG Dip), Postgraduate Certificate (PG Cert), Master of Philosophy (MPhil) and PhD (Doctor of Philosophy) are offered.

KBS also offers overseas exchange courses with other universities, including the University of Toronto, Wharton School of the University of Pennsylvania, the University of Hong Kong, the University of Sydney

== History ==
The School of Management & Business was founded in King's College London in 1989. In 1994, the school achieved departmental status and was formally established as the School of Management & Business in 2015 and began offering undergraduate degree programmes.

Since the acquisition of Bush House in a bid to expand the university's Strand Campus, KBS moved to the new building in August 2017 formally as the ninth faculty of the university. In 2023, the school achieved triple accreditation, adding AMBA accreditation for the MSc in International Management to the AACSB and EQUIS accreditations already held.

== Degree programs ==
KBS offers both undergraduate and postgraduate degrees. Undergraduate management courses base their curriculum on "modern business theory and organisational management theory and practice". Other fields that overlap with the core content being taught include finance, accounting, economics, social science, psychology, and law. Undergraduate courses such as Business Management feature a high percentage of international students (81%) and a large female cohort, comprising 58% of the student body.

== Executive Education ==
KBS Executive Education offers practical business courses, online and on-campus in central London, for mid-career and senior experienced professionals. These courses give the opportunity to review current ways of working, to add essential management and leadership skills, and to gain confidence and new perspectives. KBS currently cover topics including strategic finance, governance and compliance, people management, and marketing.

== Student life ==
All students of KCL are automatically members of the King's College London Student Union (KCLSU).

=== King's Business Club ===
The university's business society, King's Business Club was founded in 2008 and claims to be the largest student organisation of its kind in the country.
