= Temple tube station =

London Underground station

Temple
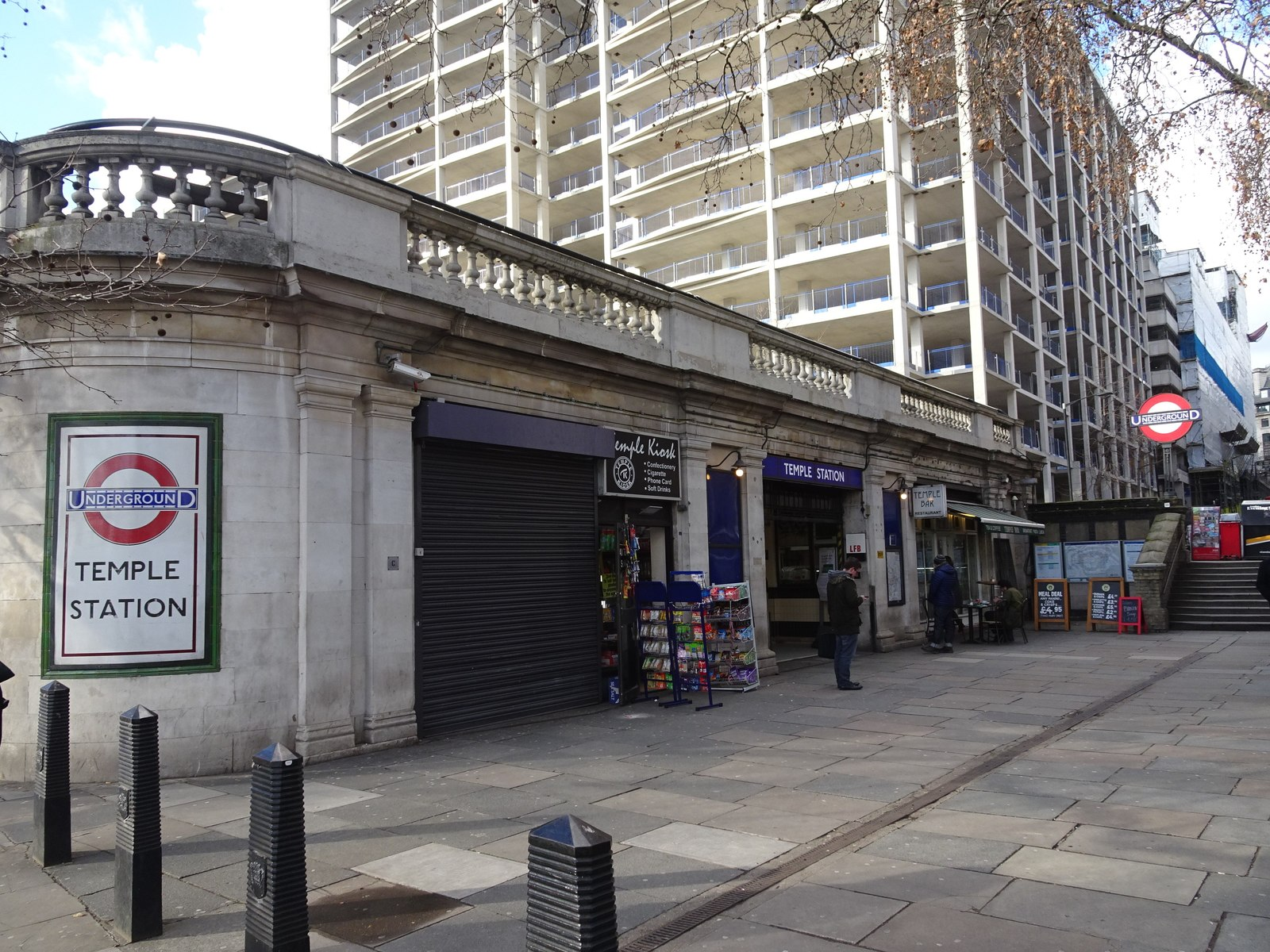
- Entrance on Victoria Embankment
- Interactive map of Temple

General information
- Location: Victoria Embankment
- Local authority: City of Westminster
- Managed by: London Underground
- Number of platforms: 2
- Fare zone: 1

London Underground annual entry and exit
- 2021: ▲3.07 million
- 2022: ▲6.37 million
- 2023: ▲7.05 million
- 2024: ▲7.90 million
- 2025: ▲8.38 million

Railway companies
- Original company: District Railway

Key dates
- 30 May 1870: Opened
- 1 February 1872: Started "Outer Circle" (NLR)
- 1 August 1872: Started "Middle Circle" (H&CR/DR)
- 30 June 1900: Ended "Middle Circle"
- 31 December 1908: Ended "Outer Circle"

Other information
- External links: TfL station info page
- Coordinates: 51.5111°N 0.1144°W

Temple is a London Underground station located at Victoria Embankment in the City of Westminster, close to its boundary with the City of London. It is on the Circle and District lines between Embankment and Blackfriars stations, and is in London fare zone 1.

The station was opened on 30 May 1870 with the name The Temple, from the Temple area in the vicinity of Temple Church, and from the Inner Temple and the Middle Temple, two of the four Inns of Court of London. The definite article in the name fell out of use quite early.

== History ==
The Temple station was opened in the parish of St. Clement Danes on 30 May 1870 by the District Railway (DR; now the District line) when the company extended its line from Westminster to St. Paul's station (now called Blackfriars). The construction of the new section of the DR was planned in conjunction with the building of the Victoria Embankment and was achieved by the cut and cover method of roofing over a shallow trench. The current station was designed by the architect, Harry Ford. The building was limited to a single story at the insistence of local property owners.

The DR connected to the Metropolitan Railway (MR; now the Metropolitan line) at South Kensington and, although the two companies were rivals, each company operated its trains over the other's tracks in a joint service known as the "Inner Circle".

On 1 February 1872, the DR opened a northbound branch from its station at Earl's Court to connect to the West London Extension Joint Railway (WLEJR, now the West London line) which it connected to at Addison Road station (now Kensington (Olympia)). From that date the "Outer Circle" service began running over the DR's tracks. The service was run by the North London Railway (NLR) from its terminus at Broad Street (now demolished) in the City of London via the North London line to Willesden Junction, then the West London Line to Addison Road and the DR to Mansion House, which was the new eastern terminus of the DR.

From 1 August 1872, the "Middle Circle" service also began operations through the station running from Moorgate along the MR's tracks on the north side of the Inner Circle to Paddington then over the Hammersmith & City Railway (H&CR) track to Latimer Road then, via a now demolished link, to the West London line to Addison Road and the DR to Mansion House. The service was operated jointly by the H&CR and the DR.

On 30 June 1900, the Middle Circle service was withdrawn between Earl's Court and Mansion House.

At the beginning of the 20th century early plans for the Great Northern and Strand Railway (later incorporated into the Great Northern, Piccadilly & Brompton Railway and now part of the Piccadilly line) included a proposal for the line to continue to Temple. The plan was rejected and the route was ended instead at the now closed Aldwych station, about 200 metres (660 feet) to the north.

On 31 December 1908, the Outer Circle service was withdrawn from the DR tracks.

In 1949, the Metropolitan line-operated Inner Circle route was given its own identity on the Tube map as the Circle line.

For many years, Temple station was closed on Sundays. In the new Tube Map of March 2005, it stated that it would be open on Sundays from 8 May 2005 onwards.

The rooftop of the station has been converted into an open-air art exhibition space known as The Artist's Garden.

== Gallery ==
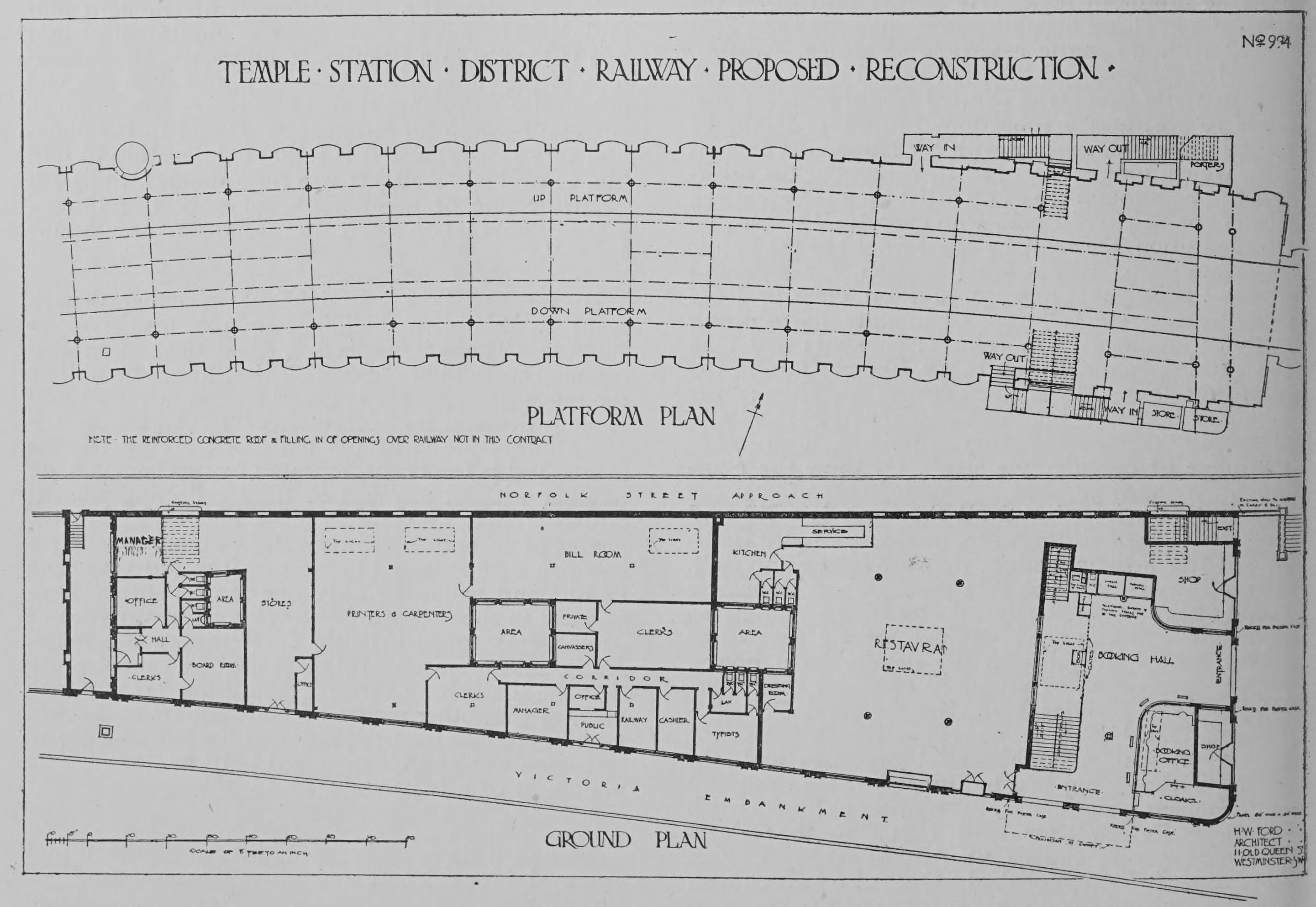
Floor plans, by architect Harry Wharton Ford (1875–1947)

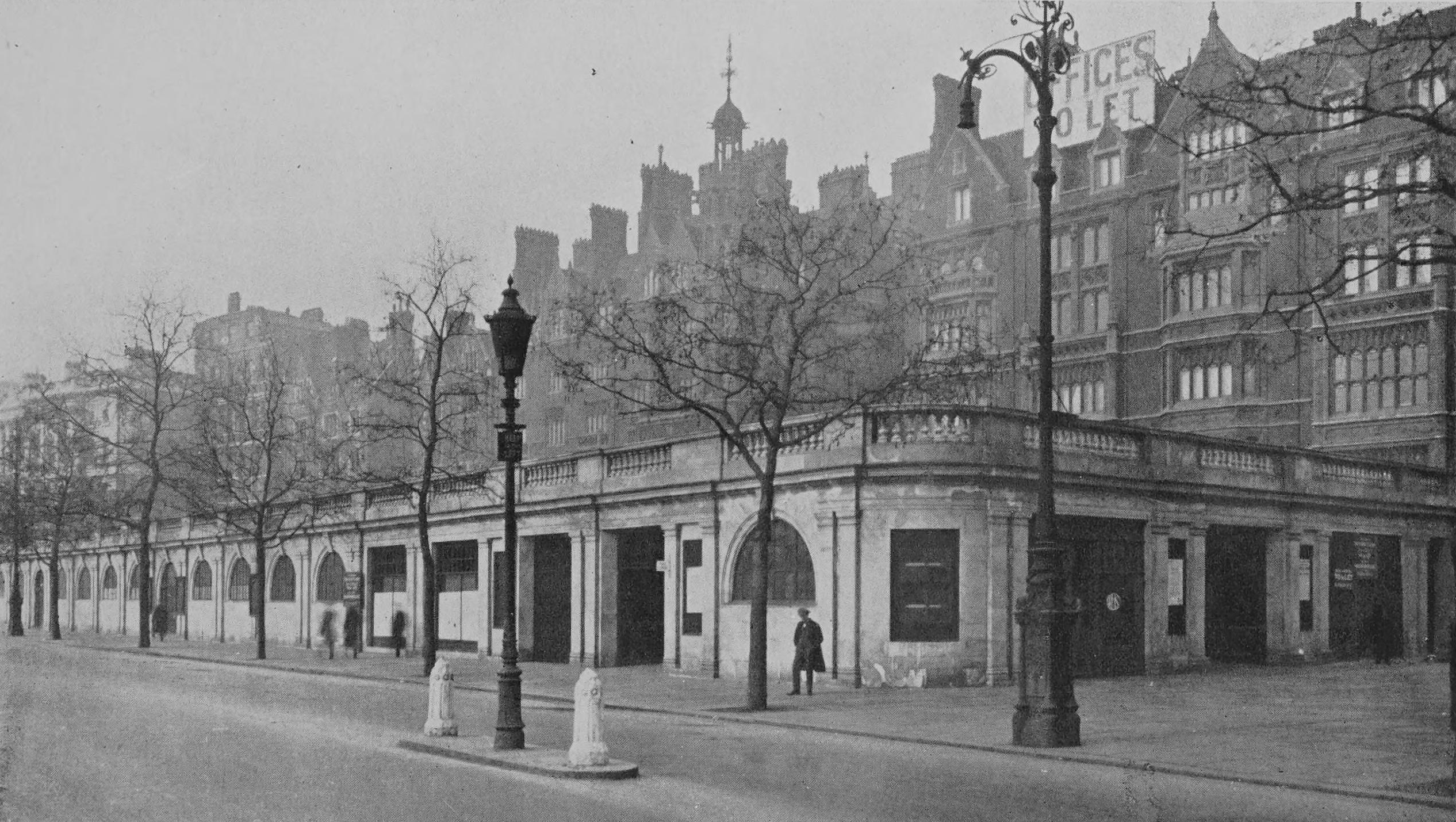
Exterior, east end

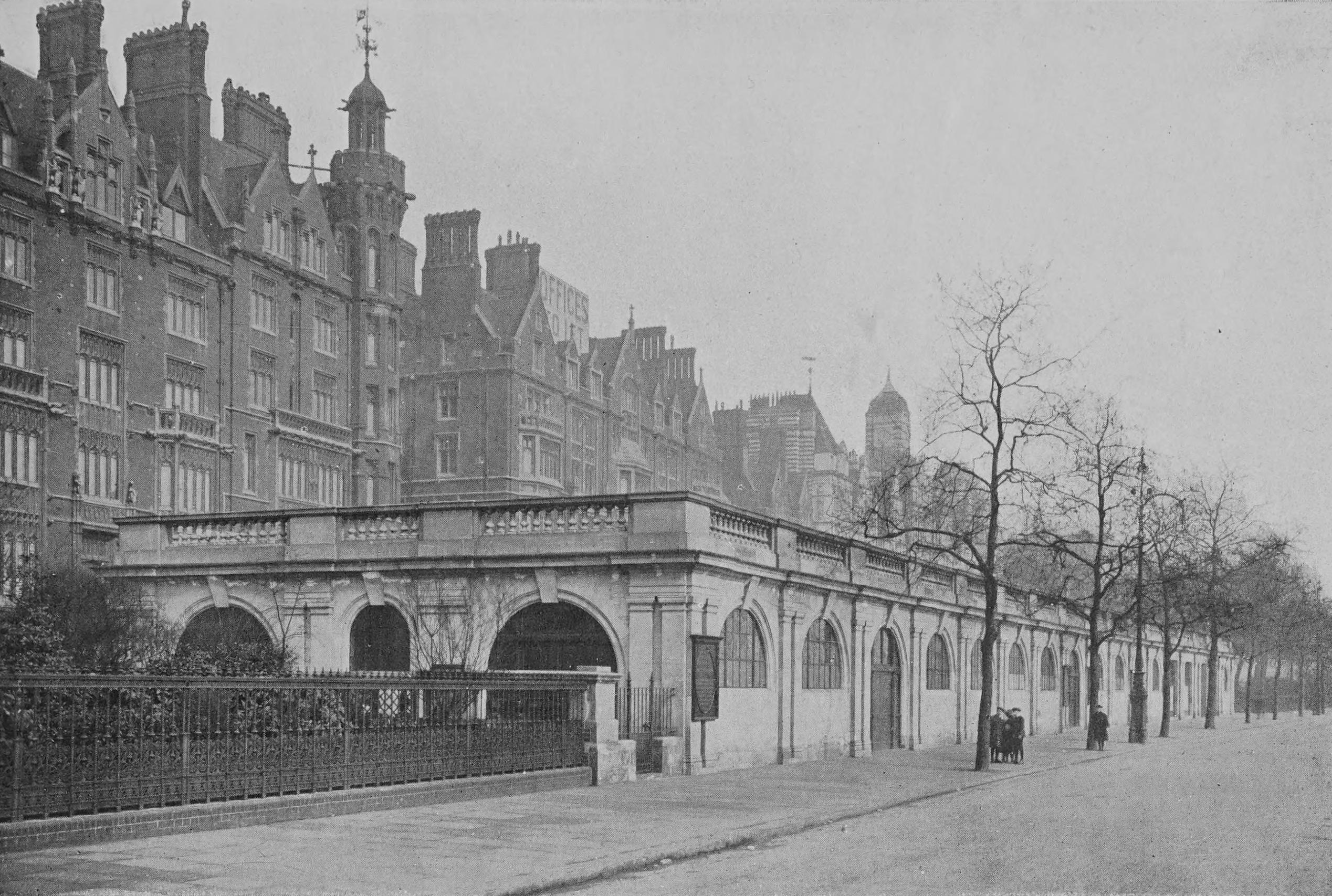
Exterior, west end

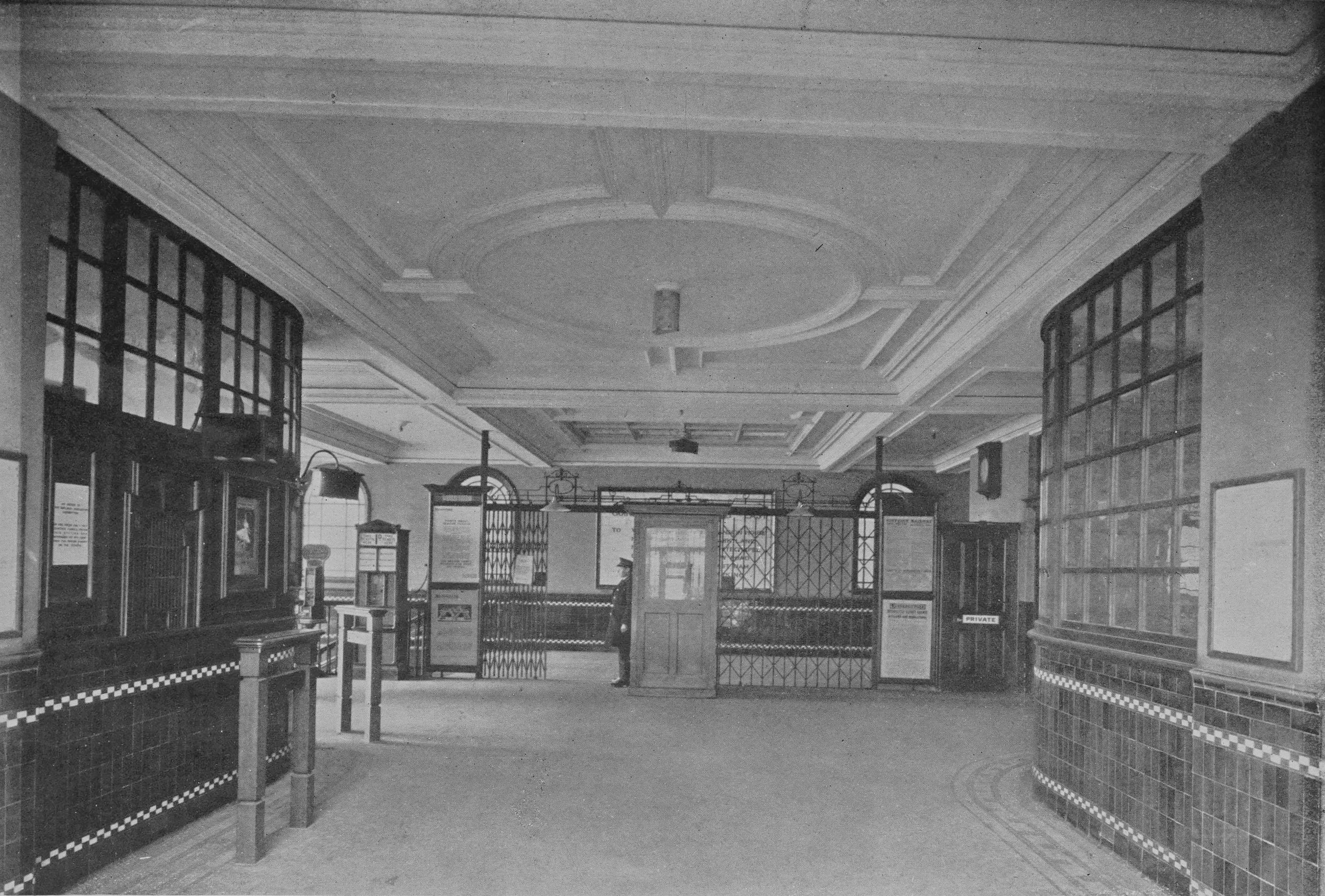
Booking hall

Preceding station	London Underground	Following station
Embankment towards Edgware Road via Victoria	Circle line	Blackfriars towards Hammersmith via Tower Hill
Embankment towards Wimbledon, Richmond or Ealing Broadway	District line	Blackfriars towards Upminster
