= The Artists Project =

Photography collective

The Artists Project, formerly known as The Starving Artists Project, captures press portrait photography. This project provides press photo sessions for celebrities and then donates the rest of the day for artists, musicians, actors, or anyone in need of portrait photography, all on a donation basis. If attendees cannot afford to pay anything The Artists Project will provide press photography for free. This project uses the leverage of brands and celebrities to help get photography to starving artists.

These press photos are taken in Los Angeles in the home of the project's founder Michael Bezjian, who is a Getty Images contributing photographer. Bezjian not only photographs celebrities, who are referred to as "posing heroes", but artists who have not yet broken into their careers, referred to by the project as "the artists". Bezjian says "We don't want their money. We will also set people up if they can't afford transportation."

The Artists Project also offers internships to those interested in gaining experience with photography, media coverage, production, videography, stylizing, editing, graphic designing, professional hair and make-up, and all umbrella aspects of the project and its respective industry, entertainment. An article in LA Weekly provided an ambiance for the project

== History ==
In 2014, the press photographer Michael Bezjian started The Artists Project from his house in Los Angeles, California. In 2015, The Artists Project has had three additional articles describing what the project does and can do for both celebrities and artists. By July 2015, there had been over 500 artists helped, according to the website.

In early 2016, the comedian Denise Vasquez met The Artists Project for a portrait session. She met the producer and photographer Tasia Wells for a Q&A session.
