= Lakwena Maciver =

Visual artist

Lakwena
- Born: 1986 (age 39–40); London, England
- Education: London College of Communication (Graphics Media Design and Illustration, 2009)
- Occupation: Artist
- Known for: Text-based murals and panel paintings
- Parent(s): English mother, Ugandan father

Lakwena Maciver (born 1986) is a London-based artist. She is best known for her text based murals and panel paintings.

== Early life and education ==
She was born in London in 1986 to an English mother and a Ugandan father. She spent part of her childhood in Ethiopia and teenage years in Kenya, and most of her life in England.

Maciver graduated in 2009 from the London College of communication and there she studied Graphics Media Design and Illustration.

== Career ==
Her work, which is primarily text-based, combines words, patterns, and acid-bright colour. She first gathered attention in 2013 with her Remember Paradise mural for the 2013 Wynwood walls festival in Miami.

== See also ==
- Ugandan diaspora
- Street art
- Public art
- Word art
