= Artists (radio series) =

BBC radio programme

- Genre: Comedy drama
- Running time: 30 minutes
- Country of origin: United Kingdom
- Language: English
- Home station: BBC Radio 4
- Starring: Vicki Pepperdine; Pauline McLynn; Graham Crowden; Mina Anwar; Ben Miller; Dave Lamb
- Original release: 26 March 2003 – 12 May 2004
- No. of series: 2
- No. of episodes: 10
- Audio format: Stereophonic sound
- Website: Artists at BBC

Artists is a comedy-drama radio programme that aired from March 2003 until April 2004. There were two series broadcast on BBC Radio 4. It starred Vicki Pepperdine and Pauline McLynn.

== Cast ==
- Vicki Pepperdine as Tamsin
- Pauline McLynn as Dolores
- Graham Crowden as Gerard
- Mina Anwar as Nisha
- Ben Miller as Josef
- Dave Lamb as Marcus

== Plot ==
Set in St. Ives, Cornwall, a community of artists argue with each other and about their works.

== Episodes ==
=== Series one ===
No. overall	No. in series	Title	Original release date
1	1	"Moor Will Mean Worse"	26 March 2003
2	2	"The Inner Child"	2 April 2003
3	3	"Inspired"	9 April 2003
4	4	"Love's Banquet"	16 April 2003
5	5	"The War of Dog"	23 April 2003
6	6	"A Brush with Death"	30 April 2003

=== Series two ===
No. overall	No. in series	Title	Original release date
7	1	"Self-Destruct"	21 April 2004
8	2	"Unholy Alliances"	28 April 2004
9	3	"Raw Emotion"	5 May 2004
10	4	"Special Happy Places"	12 May 2004

== Broadcast History ==
The show was originally broadcast on BBC Radio 4, however repeats have also been aired on BBC Radio 7 and BBC Radio 4 Extra.
