= Tas (series) =

1955 novels by Reginald Alec Martin

First editions (publ. Thomas Nelson & Sons) Cover art by Bruce Cornwell

The Tas series is a pair of children's science fiction novels written by Reginald Alec Martin, under the pseudonym of E. C. Eliott. The books were illustrated by A. Bruce Cornwell. They are set, at least at the beginning, at the Woomera Rocket Range in Australia.

== Plot ==
Tas and his friends have adventures with rockets and spaceships.

== Books ==
1. Tas and the Postal Rocket (1955)
2. Tas and the Space Machine (1955)
