= Tas (clan) =

Gujjar clan

Mundan
- Religions: Hinduism; Sikhism; Islam
- Languages: Gujari; Punjabi; Gujarati; Haryanvi; Marwari; Pahari; Pashto; Balochi; Hindi, Urdu
- Country: India; Pakistan
- Region: Gujjarat; Rajasthan Punjab; Kashmir, Balochistan; Haryana, Himachal Pradesh; Uttar Pradesh
- Ethnicity: Gurjar (Gujjar)
- Feudal title: Choudhary, Singh

Tas is an agricultural clan of the Indian and Pakistani Gurjar ethnic community in Indian Punjab. Tas Gujjars are adherents of Hinduism, Islam and some are also Sikh.

== Geographical distribution ==
They inhabit several different Indian states, including Rajasthan, Haryana, Uttar Pradesh, Punjab, Madhya Pradesh, Uttarakhand, Jammu and Kashmir, Gujarat, Himachal Pradesh and Dehli. In Pakistan they inhabit Khyber Pakhtunkhwa, Azad Kashmir, Balochistan and Punjab (especially in Gujrat, Lahore, Sialkot and Gujranwala districts) provinces of Pakistan.
