= The Artist as a Young Machine =

The Artist as a Young Machine was a multimedia exhibition that took place at the Ontario Science Centre in Toronto throughout the summer of 1984. The exhibits demonstrated the use of technology in creating and experience many different forms of art. Since many of the attendees were children, a heavy emphasis was placed on human-machine interaction that did not require any special artistic or technical skill on the part of the attendee.

Artforms included computer graphics, writing, music, animation, and choreography.

Several 8-bit computing platforms were featured in hands-on, interactive displays that let attendees create their own art using technology. For example, one could use MacPaint and MacWrite running on the then-new Apple Macintosh to create black-and-white bitmap graphics and written text; use a variety of synthesizers to create music; and dance in front of a video camera connected to a video processor that would introduce a variety of special effects and project the result onto a large screen in real-time.

Other technology on display included the Commodore 64 computer running educational video games for children, DEC Unix workstations running the Logo turtle graphics interpreter, and the pen-based Sony GrEdit for creation of computer graphics.

One notable exhibit featured computer generated works of art demonstrating early forms of artificial intelligence.

Short films featuring computer-assisted animation were also shown, including one titled Night Flight.
