= The Artists' Studio =

Independent for-profit community theatre in Fishers, Indiana, USA

The Artists' Studio is an independent for-profit community theatre, located in Fishers, Indiana, United States. It was founded in January 2003 by David and Joellyn Young, an ex-Broadway musical director and actress respectively. David Young has traveled with Broadway shows such as Camelot, South Pacific, and The Music Man, while Joellyn appeared as Eva Perón in Evita. The theater was renovated from a night club, with the addition of a stage. The theater is also considered by Noblesville to be one of its places of interest.

The proscenium stage is of classic design and allows for a variety of different trims to be placed around as well as the movement of the back wall, though there is no fly space. The remaining space allows for a 220-seat house complete with sound and lighting systems, office space, and classrooms. Cast, crew, and most other members of the theater are volunteers.

== Productions ==
Seasons at the Artists' Studio have so far consisted of eight shows, including a holiday show, and for the first several years, a "young artists production" for actors and actresses ages 13–25. The young artists performed Grease in the first and last years that their production was running. The seasons normally end at the start of summer, and start again shortly after. Sometime in the summer, the theatre holds general auditions for the whole season, though each show may also hold another. The theater traditionally stages Annie around Christmas, and The Rocky Horror Show around Halloween.

=== Annie and The Rocky Horror Show ===
Brent Marty played Dr. Frank-N-Furter in the theater's production of The Rocky Horror Show. The first production of The Rocky Horror Show at the Artists' Studio was named as one of the best shows of 2003 in Indiana by NUVO magazine.

Annie was used as the annual holiday show until 2006, and occasionally after that. Daddy Warbucks, the lead male character, was played by Jay Meisenhelder for several years until a controversy. Annie was the first show at The Artists' Studio to have a Cast A and B, though only for the children involved in the show. This became common practice for all subsequent productions of Annie and for future shows requiring a child cast.

== Family Theatre ==
After Annie outsold any previous production, and continued as a success for several years, the theatre began casting more and more children in shows, including adding children into shows that didn't require them, such as urchins in Aladdin. Eventually many shows with children were staged at the Artists' Studio, including Wizard of Oz, Oliver, Seussical, The Music Man, and Joseph and the Amazing Technicolor Dreamcoat,

=== The Artists' Studio Kids ===
In addition to classes and camps, the Artists' Studio began producing shows exclusively for children, beginning with Bye Bye Birdie in November 2007, continuing on with Grease in the spring 2008, and many subsequent productions. Children are charged more than $100 to perform in these productions, which is unusual for theatres in the area.

== Other activities ==
The Artists' Studio also offers dancing, acting and singing classes, and hosts children's birthday parties. As a for-profit organization the theatre is not eligible for the Encore Association's awards for community theatres in Indiana, as no productions with paid performers can be nominated.
