= David Trendell =

English organist and lecturer

- Born: 17 August 1964
- Origin: England
- Died: 28 October 2014 (aged 50)
- Occupations: Organist, Lecturer and Director of Music

David Robin Charles Trendell (17 August 1964, in Tavistock, Devon, England – 28 October 2014) was an English organist, lecturer and Director of Music at King's College London. He specialised in the music of William Byrd.

== Education ==
Trendell was a chorister at Norwich Cathedral before being offered a choral scholarship to King's College, Cambridge and an organ scholarship to Exeter College, Oxford. He chose the latter.

== Career ==
Trendell began his career as assistant organist at Winchester College. In 1989, he moved to Oxford and was appointed organist at the University Church of St Mary the Virgin; thereafter he was a tutor at St Hugh's, St Hilda's and Oriel colleges. He arrived at King's College London in 1992 as Director of Chapel Choir and lecturer in Music and remained there until his death in October 2014. While at King's, he was credited in bringing to prominence the chapel choir. The choir regularly broadcast with BBC Radio 3 for evensong. Beyond college life, he was also director of music at St Bartholomew-the-Great, Smithfield and later Director of Music at St Mary's, Bourne Street, London.

== Recordings ==
- 2000 - Missa Corona Spinea - John Taverner, Choir of King's College London directed by David Trendell, Sanctuary Gaudeamus
- 2002 - Missa Simile est regnum caelorum, Missa O rex gloriae and Lamentations - Alonso Lobo, Choir of King's College London directed by David Trendell on Sanctuary Gaudeamus
- 2005 - Sebastian de Vivanco. Missa Crux Fidelis. Motets, Choir of King's College London directed by David Trendell, Sanctuary Gaudeamus
- 2010 - Philippe Rogier. Missa Ego sum qui sum. Motets - Philippe Rogier, Choir of King's College London, directed by David Trendell, Hyperion Records
- 2012 - Missa In Lectulo Meo, Missa Christus Resurgens, Miserere, Motets - Gregorio Allegri, Choir of King's College London, directed by David Trendell, Delphian Records
- 2013 - Deutsche Motette - German Romantic Choral Music from Schubert to Strauss, Choirs of Gonville & Caius College and King's College London, directed by Geoffrey Webber and David Trendell, Delphian Records
- 2014 - Messe de Requiem - Alfred Desenclos, Choir of King's College London, directed by David Trendell, Delphian Records
