= Guy's Campus =

Campus of King's College London

Coordinates: 51°30′12″N 0°05′21″W

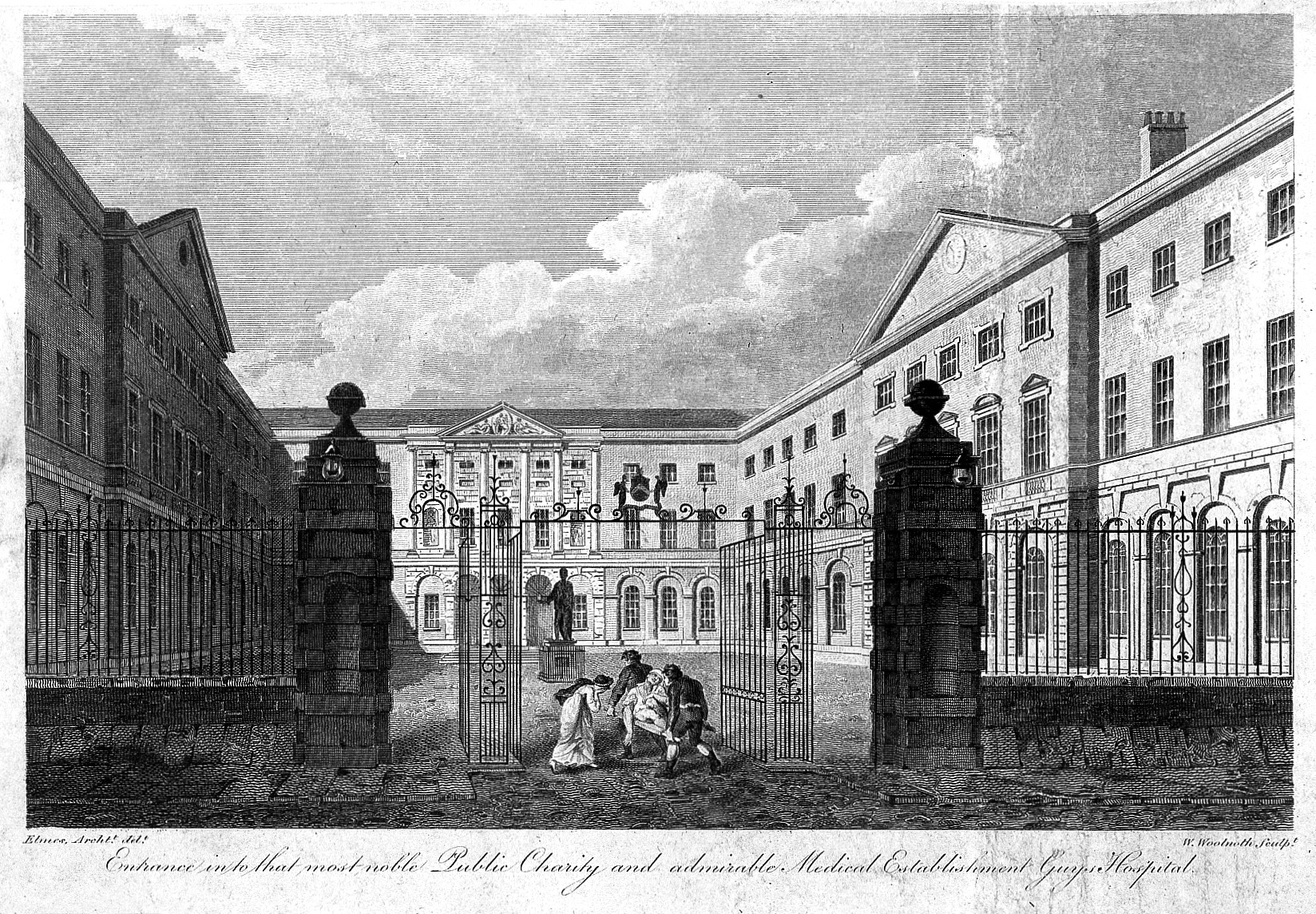
Engraving of Guy's campus entrance, by James Elmes and William Woolnoth in 1799

Guy's Campus is a campus of King's College London adjacent to Guy's Hospital and situated close to London Bridge and the Shard, on the South Bank of the River Thames in London. It is home to the Faculty of Life Sciences & Medicine and the Dental Institute.

The campus is named for Thomas Guy, the founder and benefactor of Guy's Hospital established in 1726 in the London Borough of Southwark. Buildings include Guy's Chapel, the Henriette Raphael building, the Hodgkin building and Shepherd's House. The Students' Union centre at Guy's is situated in Boland House. Guy's Campus is located opposite the Old Operating Theatre Museum, which was part of old St Thomas Hospital in Southwark.

The nearest Underground stations are London Bridge and Borough.

== Buildings ==
=== Guy's Chapel ===
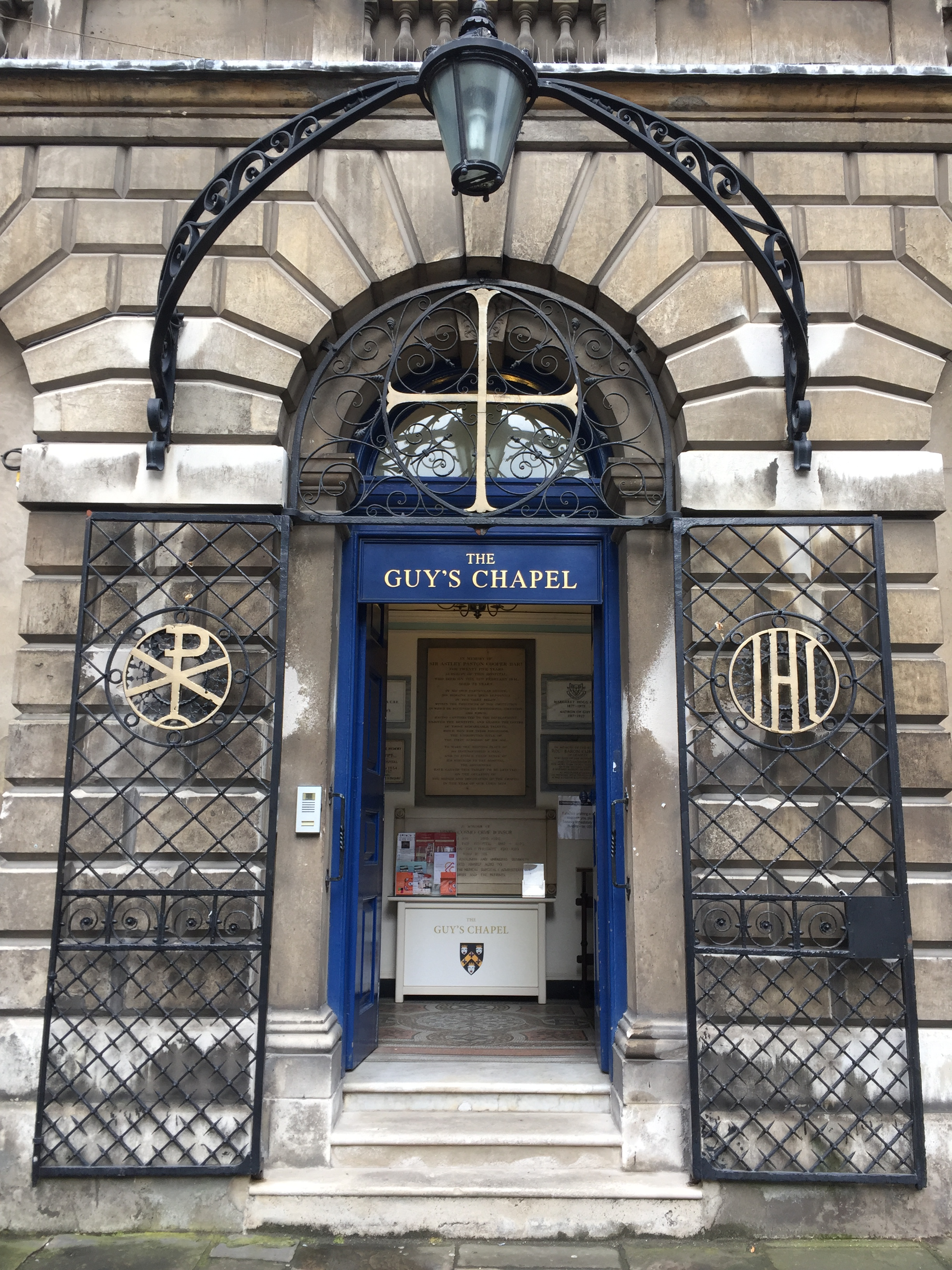
Grade II* listed Guy's Chapel

The Grade II* listed Guy's Chapel is one of the oldest parts of the original hospital. It was finished in 1780 and features Victorian stained glass windows and mosaic murals. The chapel is in the centre block of the west wing of the original Guy's Hospital. There is a white marble monument to Thomas Guy by John Bacon inside the main door of the chapel. The monument was erected in 1779, and is set in a semicircular-arched surround made of green marble. The chapel houses the tomb of Thomas Guy, and is the resting place of English surgeon and anatomist Sir Astley Cooper. The coffin-shaped stone tomb of Guy where his remains rest is located in the crypt beneath the chapel. The chapel also contains memorials to hospital's benefactors and members of the hospital staff.

=== The Colonnade ===
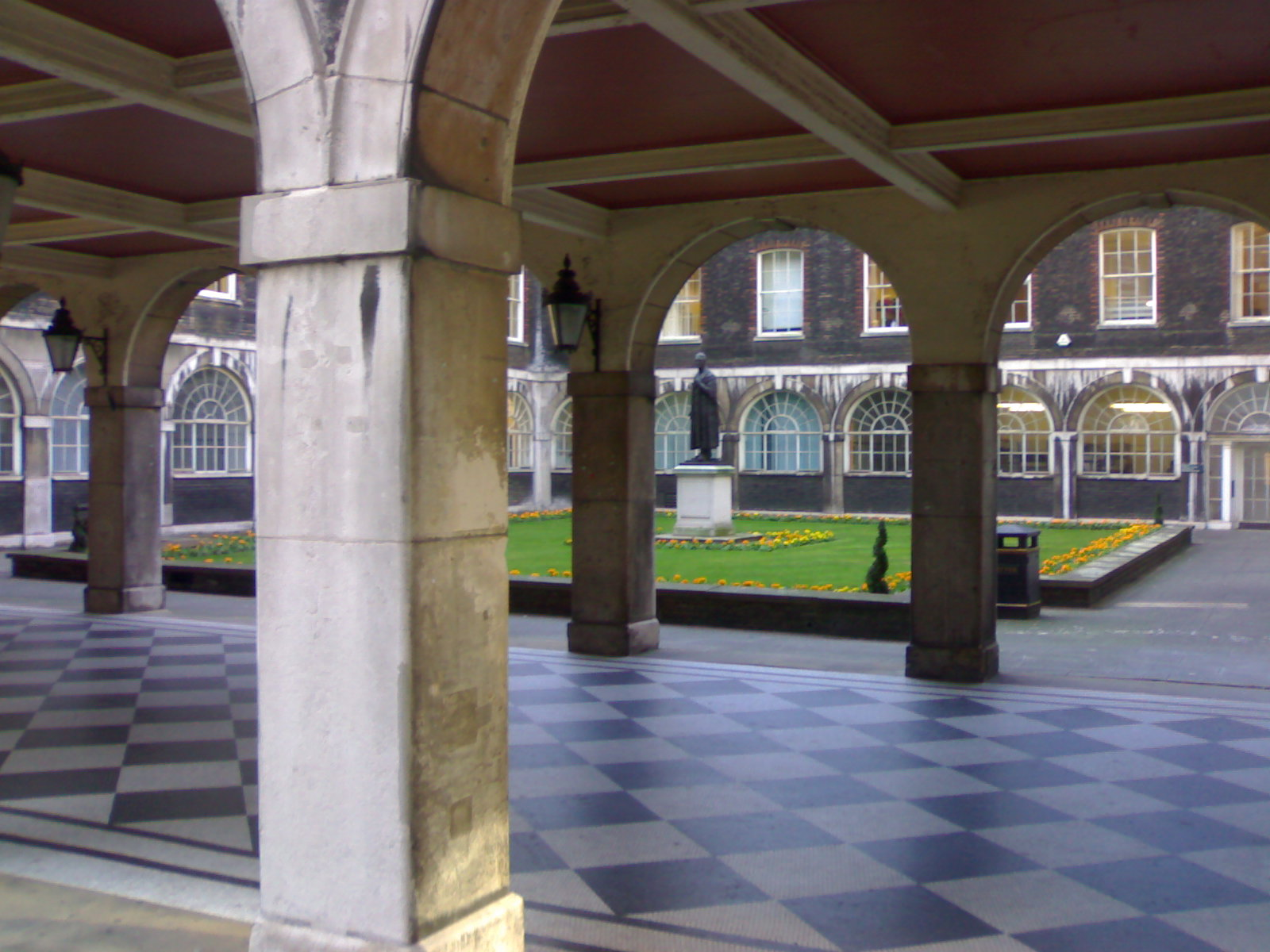
The Colonnade and Western courtyard with the statue of Viscount Nuffield

The Colonnade is also part of the original Guy's Hospital. It was built with two courtyards on either side. A round-hooded Portland stone alcove with a figure sitting inside is located at the eastern courtyard of the Colonnade. The alcove was originally part of, and is one of the surviving fragments of the old London Bridge that was demolished in 1831. The alcove was brought to the hospital in 1861, and was re-erected within the eastern internal court in 1926. The alcove now houses the statue of John Keats, an English Romantic poet who studied at Guy's Hospital from 1815 to 1816 to become an apothecary. The statue displayed at the western courtyard on the other side of the Colonnade is that of William Morris, 1st Viscount Nuffield, another benefactor of Guy's Hospital. The front courtyard, named the General Court, was later built in 1738, and the part of the Georgian complex was completed in 1780. A brass statue of Thomas Guy by Peter Scheemakers stands in the centre of the General Court, upon a pedestal with bas-reliefs of "Christ Healing the Sick" and the "Good Samaritan".

=== Henriette Raphael House ===
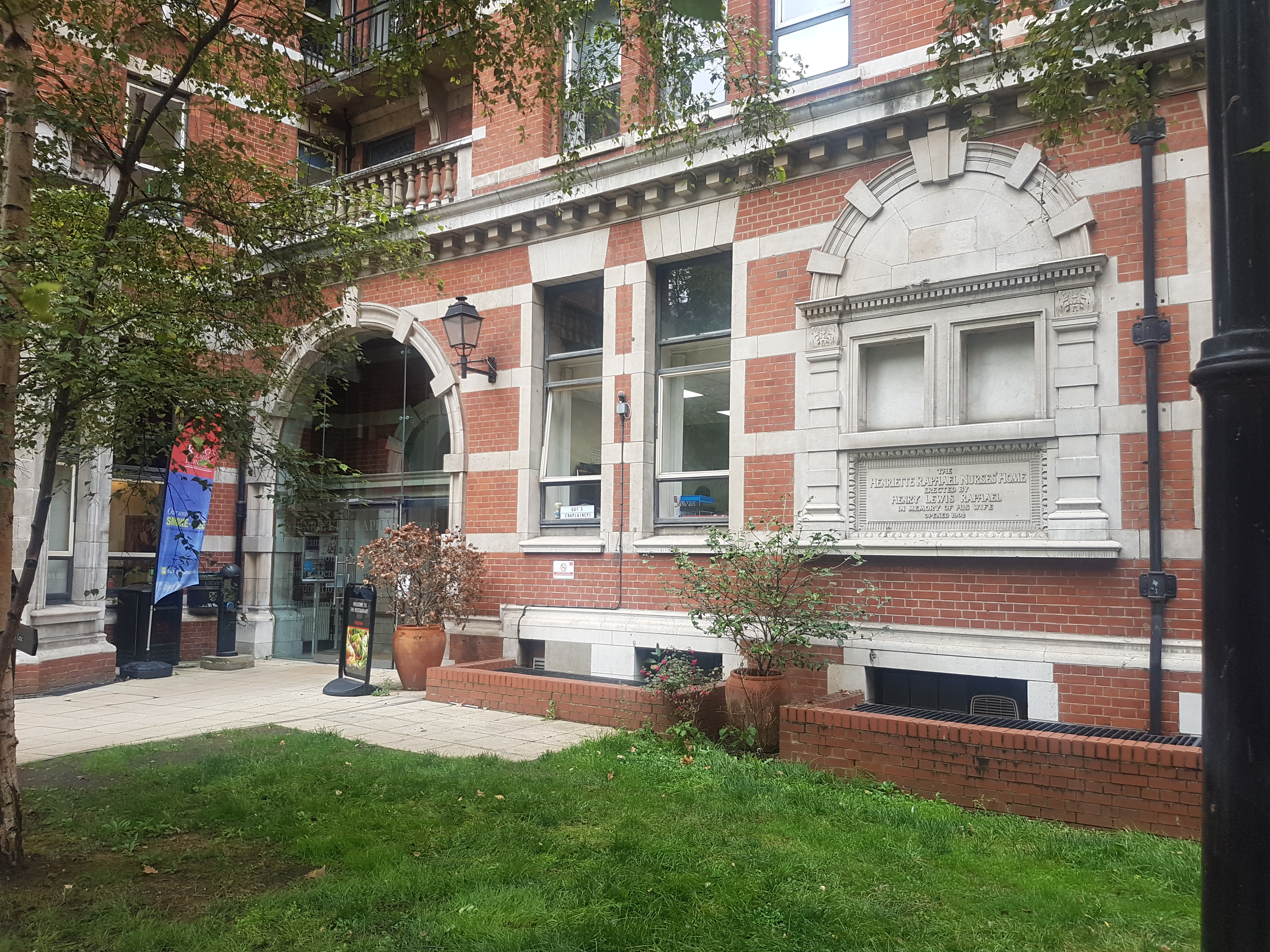
Henriette Raphael House

Henriette Raphael House was opened in 1902. It is the first purpose built nurses' home in London. The house was named after Henriette Raphael, and was funded by donations from her merchant banker husband Henry Louis Raphael, and her sons Walter Raphael and barrister Herbert Raphael.

=== Hodgkin Building ===
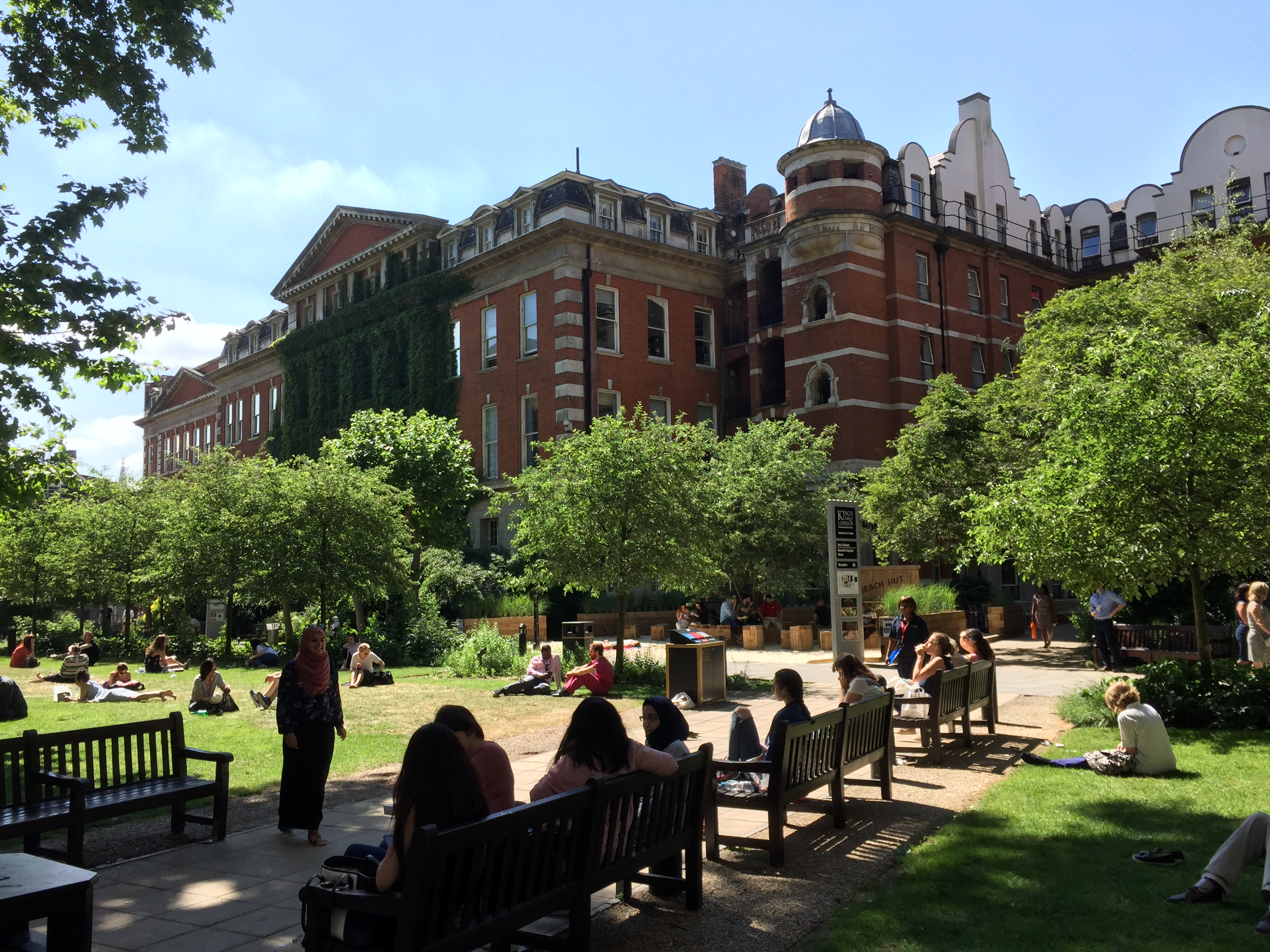
Hodgkin Building

The Hodgkin Building was named after Thomas Hodgkin, the demonstrator of morbid anatomy (anatomical pathology as it is now called), the former curator of the museum at Guy's Hospital Medical School and best known for the first account of Hodgkin's disease. The building is the original medical school building of Guy's Hospital.

The entrance hall and corridor of the Hodgkin Building displays busts of King's alumni and benefactors, including Thomas Addison, William Babington, Golding Bird, Richard Bright, Astley Cooper and Richard Mead. The Hodgkin Building currently houses lecture theatres, teaching laboratories, dissecting rooms, museums (Gordon Museum of Pathology and Museum of Life Sciences) and research centres. The original medical school library, Wills Library, is also located on the ground floor of the building.

=== Shepherd's House ===
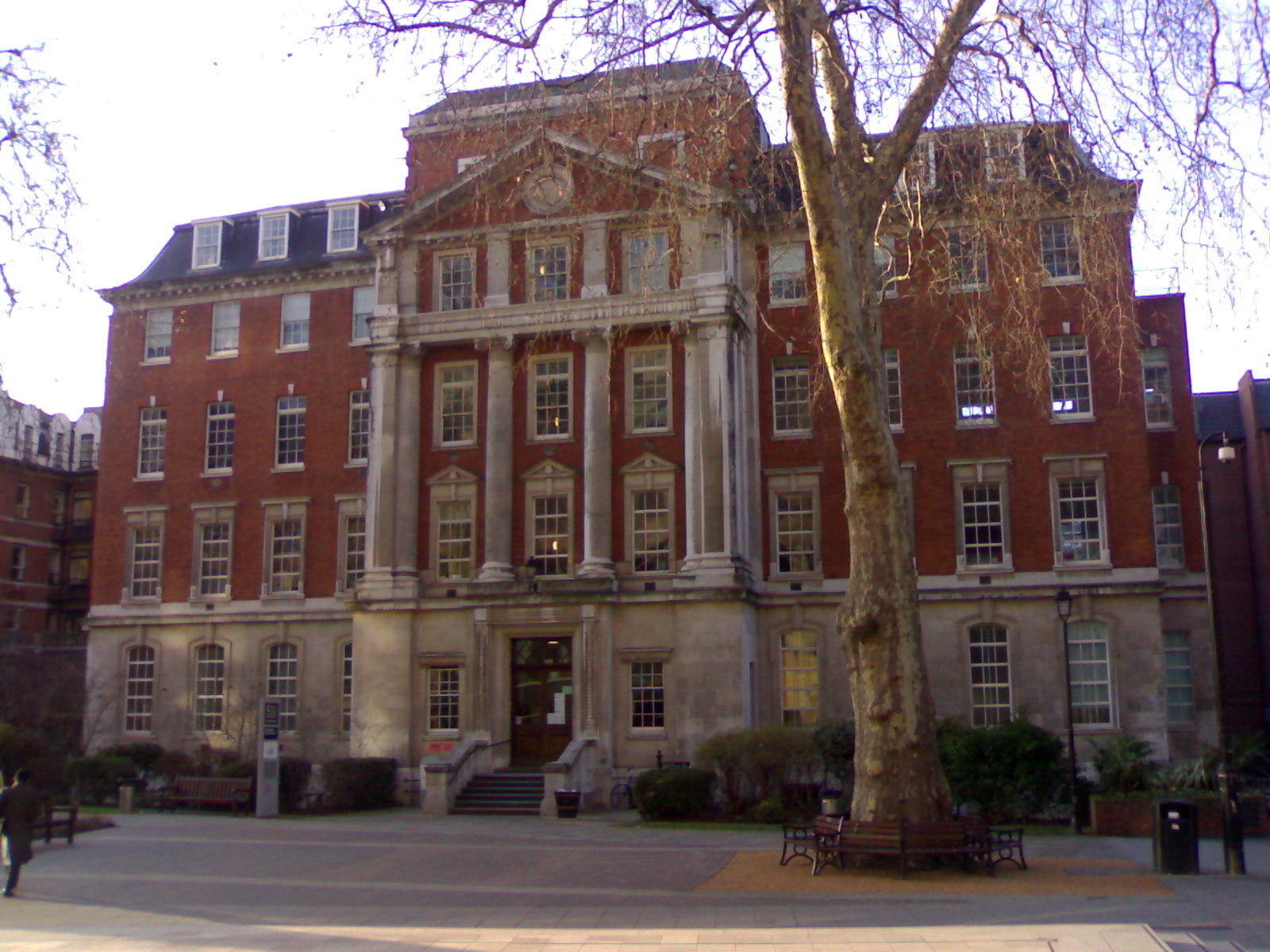
Shepherd's House

Shepherd's House was completed in 1921. It is named after William Sheppard, a wealthy benefactor. It was the School of Nursing from 1921 to 1994; it now hosts the Chantler Clinical Skills Centre.
