= Immortal Egypt =

British documentary television series

- Also known as: The Story of Egypt
- Written by: Joann Fletcher
- Directed by: Sophie Elwin-Harris
- Presented by: Joann Fletcher
- Country of origin: United Kingdom
- Original language: English
- No. of seasons: 1
- No. of episodes: 4

Production
- Running time: 59 minutes
- Production company: Lion Television

Original release
- Network: BBC Two
- Release: 4 January – 25 January 2016

Immortal Egypt with Joann Fletcher, also known as The Story of Egypt, is a British documentary television miniseries about ancient Egypt, written and presented by Egyptologist and educator Joann Fletcher. The series first aired on BBC Two from 4 to 25 January 2016.

Immortal Egypt chronicles the history of ancient Egypt, from its prehistoric era through each of its different periods: the Early Dynastic Period, the Old Kingdom, the First Intermediate Period, the Middle Kingdom, the Second Intermediate Period, the New Kingdom, the Third Intermediate Period, the Late Period and the era of Persian rule, the Ptolemaic period, and the Roman period.

Throughout the miniseries' four episodes, Fletcher is shown visiting numerous tombs, ruins, archaeological sites, and other locations across Egypt, as well as examining artefacts housed at various British museums. During the production of Immortal Egypt, Fletcher and the miniseries' production company Lion Television were granted "unprecedented access" to the Mortuary Temple of Amenhotep III.

== Episodes ==
No.	Title	Directed by	Written by	Original release date
1	"The Road to the Pyramids"	Sophie Elwin-Harris	Joann Fletcher	4 January 2016
The first episode introduces ancient Egypt, from its prehistoric era to its Early Dynastic and Old Kingdom periods. Subjects featured include Paleolithic petroglyphs in Qurta; the development of Egyptian gods and goddesses such as Hathor; the rise of settlements along the Nile River like Faiyum and Qena; mummification and the Gebelein predynastic mummies; early calendars and tax records; the Narmer Palette; the pharaoh Djoser and his chancellor Imhotep; the Pyramid of Djoser; and the Giza pyramid complex.
2	"Chaos"	Sophie Elwin-Harris	Joann Fletcher	11 January 2016
The second episode explores the First Intermediate Period of Egypt—an era marked by famines and civil wars—as well as the Middle Kingdom Period and Second Intermediate Period. Topics covered include the pyramid of Unas and its accompanying causeway; the decentralization of the Egyptian state and the rise of provincial nomarchs like Ankhtifi; Mentuhotep II; a warriors' tomb in Deir el-Bahari, part of the Theban Necropolis; the development of fortifications; and the rise to power and eventual defeat of the Hyksos.
3	"Zenith"	Sophie Elwin-Harris	Joann Fletcher	18 January 2016
The third episode focuses on the age of ancient Egypt's New Kingdom. Subjects examined include Amenhotep III and the Colossi of Memnon, which stand at the front of Amenhotep III's now-ruined Mortuary Temple; the establishment of the Valley of the Kings; the temple complex of Karnak; the introduction of Atenism by the pharaoh Akhenaten and his Great Royal Wife Nefertiti; Tutankhamun and his tomb; and the relocation of royal mummies by Butehamun, under the orders of Karnak's High Priests of Amun.
4	"Invasion"	Sophie Elwin-Harris	Joann Fletcher	25 January 2016
The fourth episode spans ancient Egypt's Third Intermediate Period, Late Period, Ptolemaic period, and Roman period. Among the topics explored are the Libyan takeover of Egypt; the Nubian invasion, which led to the Twenty-Fifth Dynasty (whose pharaohs originated from the Kingdom of Kush); Taharqa and the Nubian pyramids; the Assyrian conquest of Egypt; the rule of the Saites and an explosion in animal mummification; the cult of the sacred bull Apis; the Achaemenid conquest of Egypt by the Persian Cambyses II; the Rosetta Stone; and the arrival of Alexander the Great and the establishment of the city of Alexandria.

== Critical reception ==
Sally Newall of The Independent wrote of Immortal Egypt that, "You couldn't fault Fletcher's passion or knowledge, which, like in her previous outing in Life and Death in the Valley of the Kings, was always accessible"; this perceived accessibility, Newall said, "[makes] it easy to share her enthusiasm – even without Egyptology's most eye-catching artifacts". The Telegraph's Phil Harrison gave the miniseries a positive review, writing: "Fletcher's greatest achievement has been to rescue these abstract historical figures from the ossuary and endow them with real, relatable humanity. ... There's also her passion – declaiming enthusiastically from burial chambers and stomping keenly around archaeological digs, she's frequently seemed not just fascinated by her subjects but visibly moved by their travails."

Hadar Sela, writing for the UK division of the pro-Israel Committee for Accuracy in Middle East Reporting in America (CAMERA), criticized Immortal Egypt for making reference to Egypt's geographical relation to Palestine instead of Israel.
