= Alan Billis =

British man subject of science experiment

- Born: c. 1949; United Kingdom
- Died: January 2011 (aged 61)
- Occupation: Taxi driver
- Spouse: Jan Billis (1975–2011)

Alan Billis (c. 1949 – January 2011) was a British taxi driver who posthumously became the subject of a 2011 scientific experiment to replicate ancient Egyptian mummification techniques. Diagnosed with terminal lung cancer, Billis volunteered to donate his body to the project led by archaeologist Joann Fletcher and chemist Stephen Buckley. His body was successfully mummified using methods based on archaeological research from the Eighteenth Dynasty of Egypt and is housed at the Gordon Museum of Pathology in London.

== Biography ==
Billis was a taxi driver from Torquay who was diagnosed with lung cancer in 2009. He was married to his wife, Jan Billis, for 36 years. After reading a news article about the search for a terminally ill body donor for a mummification experiment which would be made into a documentary for Channel 4, he volunteered his body to the project. According to his wife, Billis was not particularly interested in Egyptology before the project. He died in January 2011, aged 61.

== Mummification ==
Following his death in January 2011, the mummification process was carried out by a team including chemist Stephen Buckley and archaeologist Joann Fletcher. Buckley had previously tested mummification in his kitchen and shed nearly 200 times using the legs from pigs, as pigs have similar tissue to humans. Research into recreating the mummification process began in 2003.

The procedure began with the removal of internal organs excluding the heart and brain through an incision, which were then placed in a jar. After this, the cavity was sterilised and packed with linen. Buckley first coated the body in a protective layer of substances, including pine resin, beeswax, and sesame oil. In a key departure from earlier theories which held that Egyptians used dry natron salts, Buckley's research indicated they used a natron solution. Consequently, Billis's body was immersed in a bath of this natron solution for 35 days to saturate his body tissues. As the solution soaked into his skin, it drove out the internal liquids, and started to break down the body fat into a new and highly stable form with natron salts forming crystals inside the Billis's body, making it far more resistant to decomposition. After drying in a high-temperature and low-humidity chamber for 2 weeks, the body was wrapped in linen bandages treated with oils, resins, and spices. The entire process, from death to the completion of drying, took about three months.

The process was documented in the film Mummifying Alan: Egypt's Last Secret, which aired in October 2011, and in 2012 it won a BAFTA award in the Specialist Factual category.

Much of the media coverage of the mummification erroneously claimed that it was the first known attempt in approximately 3,000 years to apply the full process to a human; however, a similar attempt was made, in 1994, by Egyptologist Bob Brier and pathologist Ronald Wade to a 76-year-old man who died of a heart attack.

Billis's mummified remains are housed in the Gordon Museum of Pathology.
