= Museum of Life Sciences =

- Established: 2009
- Location: London, United Kingdom
- Coordinates: 51.502800°N 0.089629°W
- Type: Natural history museum, University museum
- Curator: Dr. Gillian Sales
- Website: Museum of Life Sciences

The Museum of Life Sciences is a life science and natural history museum that is part of King's College London in London, England. It is housed on the Guy's Campus, adjacent to the Gordon Museum of Pathology in the Hodgkin Building. It was founded in 2009 and is the first new museum in King's College for over 100 years. It exists to explain the diversity of animal and plant life in the context of the biological and health sciences. The current curator is Dr Gillian Sales.

The Museum contains historic biological and pharmaceutical collections from the constituent colleges (Queen Elizabeth College, Chelsea College, King's College London and Guy's Medical School) that make up the modern King's College London with the exception of St. Thomas Hospital. The specimens of the Museum date from 1800s to the present, and are arranged into distinct collections: Zoological, Botanical, Pharmaceutical, Microscope Slide and Craniofacial Skeletal collections. These include skeletons, fluid-preserved material, taxidermy, dried items, fossils, microscope and a herbarium of plant material.
