= Pranjal R. Modi =

Indian professor of transplant surgery

Pranjal Ramanlal Modi (b. 1968) is an Indian professor of transplant surgery at the Institute of Kidney Diseases and Research Centre, Ahmedabad. In 2016, after more than 250 robot assisted kidney transplants, he mentored Nizam Mamode’s team in London during the UK's first procedure.
