= Nizam Mamode =

British surgeon

- Born: 1962 (age 63–64); United Kingdom
- Education: St Andrews University; Glasgow University
- Occupation: Professor of transplantation surgery
- Known for: Co-founding school in Kenya; Chairman of the British Medical Association's (BMA) junior doctor committee (2000) and later for consultants; Robotic kidney transplantation; Use of 3D printers to plan a transplant of a living-donor kidney from an adult to a child; UK's first robot assisted kidney transplant via keyhole surgery; Re-enacting King George VI's lung operation of 1951
- Medical career
- Profession: Surgeon
- Field: Transplantation
- Institutions: Guy's and St Thomas' NHS Foundation Trust; Great Ormond Street Hospital
- Sub-specialties: Kidney transplantation
- Research: Antibody incompatible transplantation

Nizam Mamode (born 1962) is a British professor of transplantation surgery. Until 2020 he was clinical lead of transplant surgery for adults and children at Guy's and St Thomas' NHS Foundation Trust and honorary consultant at Great Ormond Street Hospital. He is best known for leading the operation that used 3D printers to plan a transplant of a living-donor kidney from a father into his two year old daughter in 2015. The following year he led the team that performed the United Kingdom's first robot assisted kidney transplant via keyhole surgery. In 2017 he performed one of the UK's first paired kidney transplants in a child.

After A-levels Mamode worked in Kenya with Project Trust as a volunteer teacher and co-founded a school. He subsequently studied medicine in Scotland, completing his pre-clinical course at St Andrews University and his clinical years at Glasgow University in 1987. In 1998 he was deputy chairman of the British Medical Association's (BMA) committee for newly qualified doctors, then chairman of its negotiating committee, and later elected deputy chairman of the BMA's Central Consultants and Specialists Committee.

In 2016 Mamode appeared in Stephen Daldry's 2016 Netflix series The Crown, playing the lead surgeon Sir Clement Price Thomas in a simulation of the 1951 lung operation on King George VI.

== Early life and education ==
Nizam Mamode was born in 1962 in Britain to a Mauritian father and English mother. Following several rejections from medical schools and after his A-levels, he took a gap year with Project Trust and worked as a teacher in Nairobi, Kenya. In January 1981, at the age of 18, with a local teacher he co-founded a school for children in the small village of Igoji in Meru County, Kenya. The previous month he witnessed the effects of the 1980 Nairobi hotel bombing. It prompted him to re-apply to medical schools and was accepted for a pre-clinical course at St Andrews University in Scotland, from where he moved to from Gravesend. While studying at St Andrew's he continued to raise funds for his Kenyan school and individual sponsorships for its children. He gained a bachelor's degree in 1984. Mamode subsequently completed his clinical years at Glasgow University and graduated MB ChB in 1987.

== Early career ==
In 1994 Mamode worked as a surgeon in Rwanda. There, he saw the effects of small arms and as result signed up to the Million Faces petition which called for stricter international controls on arms. (Note: The Million Faces Campaign was a petition to collect one million faces of people around the world who supported the Control Arms Campaign. It was organised by Amnesty International, IANSA and Oxfam.) In 1998, he was working as a specialist registrar in vascular surgery at Glasgow Royal Infirmary. At that time he also served as deputy chair of the BMA’s committee for newly qualified doctors. In this role, he contributed to securing a pay agreement designed to reduce working hours and improve compensation for antisocial working patterns, resulting in pay rises for most newly qualified doctors. In 2000 he gained his MD from Glasgow, and received his FRCS. He moved to London in 2002. In March of that year he was appointed consultant in transplant surgery, and later that year was elected deputy chairman of the BMA's Central Consultants and Specialists Committee. In 2004 Mamode spent time in Minnesota, USA, learning to use the da Vinci Surgical System.

Between 2008 and 2011 Mamode was chairman of the chapter of surgeons, at the British Transplantation Society. Other roles included being on the advisory board of the Confidential Reporting System in Surgery (CORESS), to promote safety in surgical practice. (Note: CORESS was established in 2005.)

== Later career ==
In 2014 Mamode was appointed clinical lead of transplant surgery for adults and children at Guy's and St Thomas' NHS Foundation Trust (GSTT) and honorary consultant at Great Ormond Street Hospital (GOSH). The following year he led the surgical team that used the world's first integration of 3D printing of an adult-sized, living-donor kidney from a father to plan a kidney transplant into his two year old daughter. It allowed for his team to play around with the model with a view to how to close the abdomen.

In September 2016 using a da Vinci robot under the guidance of Ahmedabad's professor of transplant surgery Pranjal R. Modi, Mamode led the team that performed the UK's first robot assisted kidney transplant via keyhole surgery. The following year he performed one of the UK's first paired kidney transplants in a child. He was one of 11 transplant surgeons employed by GSTT, and was one of five surgeons who carried out transplants in children at the Trust's Evelina Children's Hospital (ECH). His research throughout his career in transplantion surgery has included blood group incompatible transplantation, laparoscopic retrieval of kidneys and long-term graft survival. Later, Judge Murdin would describe him as having "an international reputation for paediatric transplantation" who "received referrals from across the UK and beyond".

In November 2019, Mamode raised safety concerns about GOSH’s Renal Transplant Service that lead to an internal review. In May 2020, Mamode's honorary post at GOSH was terminated after the review found "matters of concern" relating to Mamode's own conduct. That same month, Mamode was restricted from practicing at the ECH, and GSTT conducted a separate investigation that "concluded that there was evidence of widespread bullying and intimidation" by Mamode. Mamode denied the allegations. He resigned from GSTT in December 2021, stating that the trust never provided a formal reason for his exclusion from ECH, and denied him an appeal. His employment ended in March 2022. In 2024, an employment tribunal found that Guy’s and St Thomas’ NHS Foundation Trust (GSTT) had acted inappropriately and was guilty of constructive dismissal, stating "the complaint of constructive unfair dismissal is well-founded and succeeds".

From October 2022 to May 2023, Mamode worked on establishing a transplant programme in Mauritius.

Mamode volunteered with Medical Aid for Palestinians in Gaza from mid-August to mid-September 2024. While working at Nasser Hospital, he treated victims of Israeli drone strikes and testified before the UK Parliament about the deliberate targeting of civilians, especially children. Mamode described regularly operating on children who had been shot by hovering drones while lying on the ground after bombings, highlighting the severe conditions faced by children and healthcare workers in Gaza.

== The Crown ==
Following advice from surgeons Harold Ellis and Pankaj Chandak, Mamode appeared as Sir Clement Price Thomas, the lead surgeon, in Stephen Daldry's 2016 Netflix series The Crown (first episode), in which he and his team showed how King George VI's cancerous lung was removed at Buckingham Palace in 1951.

== Selected publications ==
=== Articles ===
- Challacombe, Ben; Mamode, Nizam (December 2004). "Laparoscopic live donor nephrectomy". Nephrology, Dialysis, Transplantation. 19 (12): 2961–2964. doi:10.1093/ndt/gfh510. ISSN 0931-0509. PMID 15479746.
- Challacombe, B.; Kandaswamy, R.; Dasgupta, P.; Mamode, N. (March 2005). "Telementoring facilitates independent hand-assisted laparoscopic living donor nephrectomy". Transplantation Proceedings. 37 (2): 613–616. doi:10.1016/j.transproceed.2005.01.065. ISSN 0041-1345. PMID 15848474.
- Hadjianastassiou, V. G.; Johnson, R. J.; Rudge, C. J.; Mamode, N. (November 2007). "2509 living donor nephrectomies, morbidity and mortality, including the UK introduction of laparoscopic donor surgery". American Journal of Transplantation. 7 (11): 2532–2537. doi:10.1111/j.1600-6143.2007.01975.x. ISSN 1600-6135. PMID 17868058.
- Perera, Sean; Mamode, Nizam (April 2011). "South Asian patients awaiting organ transplantation in the UK". Nephrology, Dialysis, Transplantation. 26 (4): 1380–1384. doi:10.1093/ndt/gfq581. ISSN 1460-2385. PMID 20861196.
- Ahmed, Zubir; Uwechue, Raphael; Chandak, Pankaj; van Dellen, David; Barwell, Jamie; Heap, Sarah; Szabo, Laszlo; Hemsley, Carolyn; Olsburgh, Jonathon; Kessaris, Nicos; Mamode, Nizam (July 2020). "Prophylaxis of Wound Infections-antibiotics in Renal Donation (POWAR): A UK Multicentre Double Blind Placebo Controlled Randomised Trial". Annals of Surgery. 272 (1): 65–71. doi:10.1097/SLA.0000000000003666. ISSN 0003-4932. PMID 31714309.

=== Book ===
- Mamode, Nizam; Kandaswamy, Raja (2013). Abdominal Organ Transplantation: State of the Art. Chichester: John Wiley & Sons. ISBN 978-1-4443-3432-6.
