= Joann Fletcher =

British Egyptologist (born 1966)

- Born: 30 August 1966 (age 60); Barnsley, South Yorkshire, England
- Title: Honorary Visiting Professor

Academic background
- Education: Barnsley College
- Alma mater: University College London; University of Manchester
- Thesis: Ancient Egyptian Hair: a study in style, form, and function (1995)

Academic work
- Discipline: Egyptology
- Website: www.immortalegypt.co.uk

Joann Fletcher (born 30 August 1966) is an Egyptologist and an honorary visiting professor in the department of archaeology at the University of York. She has published a number of books and academic articles, including several on Cleopatra, and made numerous television and radio appearances. In 2003, she controversially claimed to have identified the mummy of Queen Nefertiti.

== Early life and education ==
Fletcher was born on 30 August 1966 in Barnsley. She was educated at Barnsley College, a sixth-form and further education college in Barnsley. She studied ancient history and Egyptology at University College London, specializing in the Ptolemaic dynasty and Cleopatra.

She graduated with a Bachelor of Arts (BA) degree in 1987. Fletcher then earned a Doctor of Philosophy (PhD) degree in 1996 from the University of Manchester, with a thesis on hair and wigs entitled "Ancient Egyptian Hair: a study in style, form, and function".

== Career ==
Fletcher is honorary visiting professor in the Department of Archaeology at the University of York and Head of the Local Ambassador Programme at the Egypt Exploration Society. She is a consultant Egyptologist for Harrogate Museums and Arts and an archaeology consultant for the museums of Wigan and Barnsley, for which she curated a trio of exhibitions in 2017–2018.

In addition, she has contributed to galleries at the National Museum of Ireland, the Great North Museum in Newcastle, Sheffield’s Weston Park Museum, Scarborough’s Rotunda Museum, the Burrell Collection in Glasgow. In 2011, she and chemist Stephen Buckley conducted an experiment to replicate ancient Egyptian mummification techniques on a human donor, taxi driver Alan Billis.

Fletcher has undertaken excavation work in Egypt, Yemen, and the UK, and has examined mummies both on-site and in collections around the world.

Fletcher writes for The Guardian newspaper and the BBC History Magazine and website. She has made numerous appearances on television and radio and was lead investigator in the History Channel television series Mummy Forensics.

Her publications include The Story of Egypt, Cleopatra the Great and The Search for Nefertiti, together with guidebooks, journal articles, and academic papers.

== Queen Nefertiti ==
In 2003, Fletcher and a multidisciplinary scientific team from the University of York, including the forensic anthropologist, Don Brothwell, took part in an expedition to the Valley of the Kings in Egypt that was sanctioned by Zahi Hawass, then head of the Supreme Council of Antiquities (SCA). The investigation pursued a hypothesis put forward by Fletcher that one of the three mummies studied could be the mummified body of Queen Nefertiti. All three of the mummified bodies had been found among a cache of mummies in tomb KV35 in 1898. The team's scientific findings supported this and the hypothesis was included in the official report submitted to Hawass and the SCA shortly after the 2003 expedition. The expedition, the result of 12 years of research, was funded by the Discovery Channel, which also produced a documentary on the findings.

Fletcher's conclusions were dismissed by a prominent group of Egyptologists (some of whom had previously claimed that the mummy in question was a male who had been young as fifteen, a theory now disproved), and the evidence used to support Fletcher's theories was declared as insufficient, circumstantial, and inconclusive. Archaeology, a publication of the Archaeological Institute of America, asserted that Fletcher's "identification of the mummy in question as Nefertiti is balderdash". Zahi Hawass, head of the Supreme Council of Antiquities of the Egyptian Ministry of Culture, subsequently banned her from working in Egypt because he said "Dr. Fletcher has broken the rules" requiring all prominent discoveries be subject to approval by the SCA prior to publication in popular media.

According to The Times newspaper, British archaeologists "leapt to her defence", however, and they reported that the research team members stood by their findings. The team members maintained that no rules were broken, on the basis that the official report submitted to the SCA included Fletcher's hypothesis, described by others as a 'discovery', and that Hawass had been informed of what was to be put forward in the television programme prior to the Discovery Channel documentary being aired.

The ban on Fletcher's research in Egypt was later lifted and she resumed working, in the Valley of the Kings, in April 2008.

== Television and radio appearances ==
- 1991: Midweek (Egyptian Hair and Cosmetics), BBC Radio 4 (21.2.91)
- 1998: Post-Mortem: Egypt Uncovered, SC4/Discovery
- 1999: Mystery of the Mummies: Cave Mummies of the Canary Islands, Union Pictures/Channel 4
- 1999: Big Breakfast interview, Channel 4 (21.6.99)
- 1999: Face of the Pharaoh, MBC/National Geographic
- 1999: Midweek (Mummies), BBC Radio 4 (9.6.99)
- 2000: Private Lives of the Pharaohs, 3-part series, TV6/Channel 4
- 2000: Face Values: the story of cosmetics, Black Inc./Discovery
- 2000: The Oldest Mummies in the World: the Chinchorro, Cicada/Discovery
- 2001: Terry Jones' Hidden History of Egypt, Seventh Art/BBC
- 2001: Terry Jones' Surprising History of Sex and Love, Seventh Art/BBC
- 2002: Who Murdered Tutankhamen: Revealed, Atlantic/Discovery/Channel 5
- 2002: The Immortals of Ancient Sheba: the Yemeni Mummies, Juniper/National Geographic/Channel 4
- 2002: The True Curse of the Mummy, Stone City Films/Channel 5
- 2002: Pyramid (interactive), BBC Digital Channel
- 2003: The Black Mummy of Libya, Fulcrum/Channel 5
- 2003: Nefertiti Revealed, Atlantic/Discovery/Channel 5
- 2003: Carvilius: the Mummy of Rome, GA&A/National Geographic
- 2003: Ancient Egyptians, WalltoWall/Channel 4
- 2003: The Making of Ancient Egyptians, WalltoWall/Channel 4
- 2003: Everywoman, World Service Radio (14.6.03)
- 2005: Death In Sakkara, BBC Interactive
- 2005: The Myth, the Magic, and the Mummy's Curse, BBC Interactive Museum exhibition
- 2005: New research on the life and death of Irt-yruw, Tyne-Tees news (16.11.05)
- 2006: Timewatch: Bog Bodies, BBC
- 2006: The Mummies of Hull Museum, BBC Look North (3.3.06)
- 2006: The Bog Bodies of Ireland, 60 Minutes News, Australia (22.3.06)
- 2007: My Yorkshire, ITV Yorkshire
- 2008: Mummy Forensics, 6-part series (Lead Investigator and Series Consultant), History Channel
- 2008: Cleopatra the Great, BBC Radio York morning show (14.5.08)
- 2010: ‘A History of the World in a Hundred Objects’: the Anubis Mask, the Inlaid Eye, BBC Radio York (18.1.10 7am, 24.1.10 11am, 16.2.10 10.45pm and 8.4.10 11am) (26.5.10)
- 2011: Mummifying Alan: Egypt's Last Secret, Blink/Channel 4/Discovery
- 2012: Death Cult: Bog Bodies of Ireland (Ancient X Files) series WAG TV for National Geographic Channel
- 2013: Ancient Egypt: Life and Death in the Valley of the Kings (2-part series; Writer/Presenter), BBC/Lion TV.
- 2013: Life and Death in the Valley of the Kings (Writer/Presenter), BBC Learning Zone/Lion TV
- 2013: Radio 5 Live with Richard Bacon (2.15-3pm), BBC Radio 5 (26.2.13)
- 2013: Woman's Hour, BBC Radio 4 (22.3.13)
- 2013: Barnsley Museum Opening, Look North and BBC Radio Sheffield 27.6.13
- 2013: "Museum of Curiosity", Episode 1 of series 6, BBC Radio 4 (30.9.13)
- 2014: Egypt's Lost Queens (Writer/Presenter), BBC/Lion TV
- 2014: Woman's Hour, BBC Radio 4 (3.9.14)
- 2015: "Seventy Million Animal Mummies: Egypt's Dark Secret", Horizon, BBC2
- 2015: The Amazing History of Egypt, BBC History Magazine podcast
- 2015: The Radio 2 Arts Show with Claudia Winkleman, BBC Radio 2 (2.10.15)
- 2015: Midweek, BBC Radio 4 (21.10.15)
- 2015: Radio 4 in Four: Most Po Radio 4pular, BBC Radio 4
- 2015: Symbols and Secrets, The Forum, BBC World Service (12.12.15)
- 2016: Immortal Egypt with Joann Fletcher (4-part series; Writer/Presenter), BBC/Lion TV
- 2016: A Good Read, BBC Radio 4 (12.7.16)
- 2016: Tattoos in Africa, Al-Jazeera Online
- 2017: Women in History Debate, BBC History Magazine podcast
- 2017: The Egypt Centre Museum of Egyptian Antiquities, promotional video
- 2017: Professors at Play: Assassins Creed Origins, internet broadcast (14.11), KM
- 2018: ‘BBC Civilisations Festival in South Yorkshire’, BBC Radio Sheffield (7.3.18)
- 2018: BBC Civilisations festival (with Margaret Mountford), The Star
- 2018: 'Bolton's Egypt: new museum galleries', BBC 1 North-West Tonight (21.9.18)
- 2019: Egypt's Unexplained Files (10 part series), Discovery Science (360 Productions/Discovery)
- 2020: PM Show, BBC Radio 4 (24.1.20)

== Selected works ==
- Fletcher, Joann (1998). Oils and perfumes of ancient Egypt. London: British Museum Press. ISBN 9780714127033.
- Fletcher, Joann (2000). Egypt's Sun King: Amenhotep III. London: Duncan Baird. ISBN 9781900131094.
- Fletcher, Joann (2002). The Egyptian book of living and dying. London: Duncan Baird. ISBN 9781903296868.
- Fletcher, Joann (2004). The search for Nefertiti: the true story of a remarkable discovery. London: Hodder & Stoughton. ISBN 9780340833049.
