= Pankaj Chandak =

Indian-born British surgeon

Pankaj Chandak M.R.C.S.Eng, FRAS
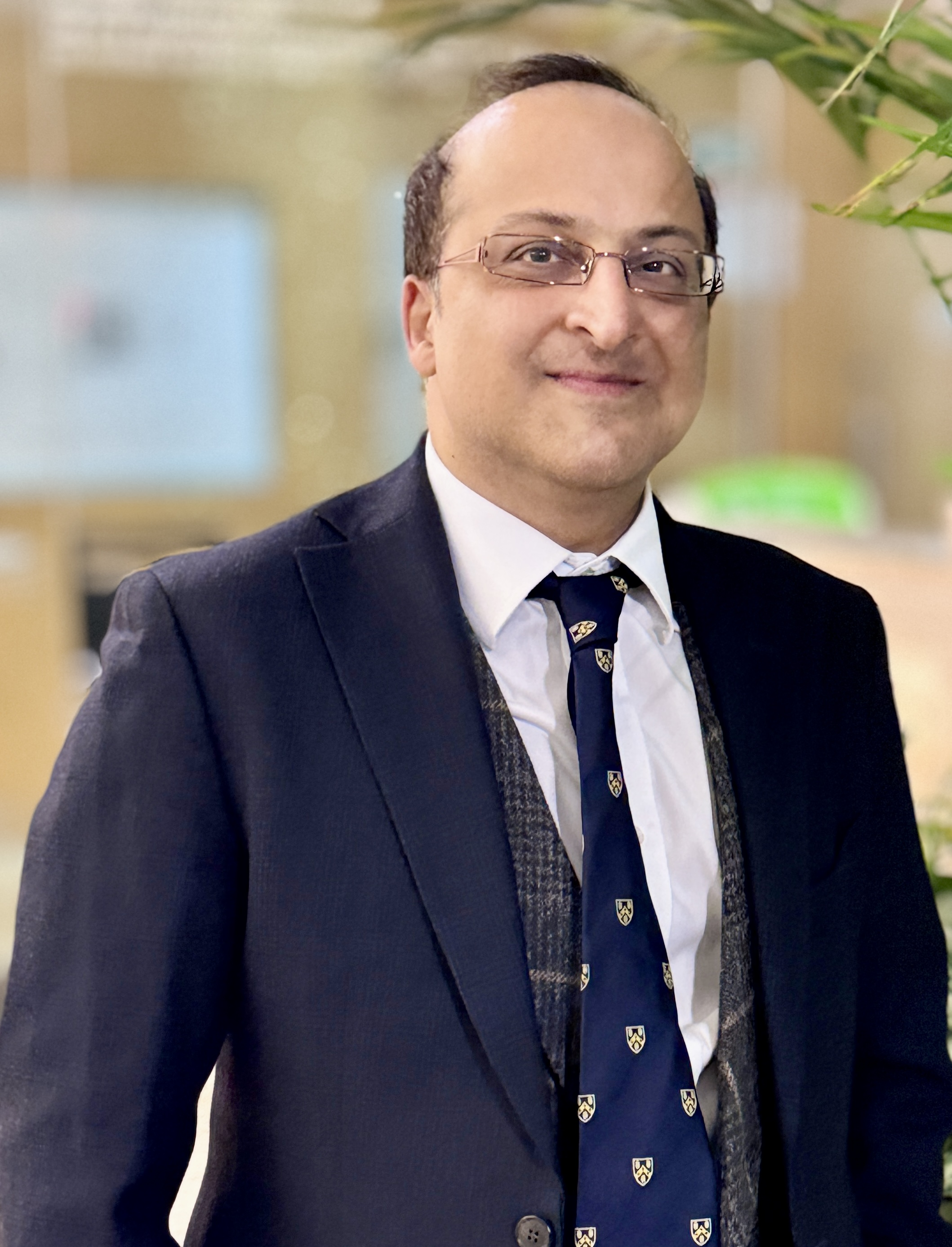
- Pankaj Chandak, Royal Society of Medicine (2024)
- Born: Akola, India
- Occupation: Surgeon
- Known for: 3D printing in paediatric kidney transplant surgery

Academic background
- Education: City of London School; Guy's; St Thomas' Hospital; King's College London
- Thesis: "Novel strategies to help overcome immunological and anatomical barriers in complex transplantation" (2020)
- Doctoral advisor: Nizam Mamode

Academic work
- Main interests: Transplant surgery

Pankaj Chandak is an Indian-born British surgeon who made innovations in the use of 3D printing in paediatric kidney transplant surgery. He has also undertaken work in education, public engagement, presenting demonstrations, and acting in The Crown television series. He graduated from Guy's and St Thomas' University of London medical school and was an anatomy demonstrator under Professor Harold Ellis CBE.

He holds an Honorary Fellowship of The Royal Asiatic Society of Great Britain and Ireland (FRAS) and has won a number of scientific and surgical awards, including the Royal College of Surgeons of England (RCSE) Lister Essay Prize and Medal, The Royal College of Surgeons and Worshipful Company of Cutlers Medal, and The Royal Society of Medicine's Norman Tanner Medal.

== Early life and education ==
Pankaj Chandak was born in Akola, India to a Marwari family and moved to the United Kingdom as a child. He received a Corporation of London Scholarship to City of London School, which he attended from 1993 to 1995. His form tutor was Dr Cook. He earned a BSc(Hons) and MBBS from Guy's, King's, and St Thomas' Medical School in 2001, and is noted to have gained M.R.C.S.Eng, FRAS, and FLS (Fellow of the Linnean Society).

As a student, he worked on the clinicopathological correlation in paediatric cerebral malaria under Dr Richard Carr and Professor Terrie Taylor in African children, and presented at the 48th Annual Meeting of the American Society of Tropical Medicine and Hygiene, Washington, 1999.

== Medical career ==
In 2017, Chandak, was a specialist registrar in transplant surgery, at Guy's, St Thomas', and Great Ormond Street Hospitals under professors Nizam Mamode and Anthony Dorling at King's College London who supervised his research fellowship in the therapeutic manipulation of organs using machine perfusion technology and the use of 3D printing in complex transplant surgery. He simultaneously teaches at the Faculty of Surgical Anatomy at the Royal College of Surgeons of England and was Anatomy Demonstrator under Professor Ellis.

Chandak planned the world's first integration of 3D printing into complex paediatric transplantation, for which he won the RSM's Norman Tanner Medal in 2016. Under media coverage, in 2015, a 3D printing of an adult-sized, living-donor kidney from a father was used by Chandak and his team to plan a kidney transplant into his daughter, who was two years old. This 3D kidney model was accepted by the Science Museum in London, for permanent exhibition in their new medical galleries which opened in 2019. Chandak's research in donor organ perfusion is also a topic in his public demonstrations.

== Public engagement ==
Chandak has been involved in communicating science to broader audiences. This has included presenting live demonstrations for the BBC, Channel 5, the British Science Festival 2016, and London Open House. The main areas of his discussions focus on minimally invasive surgery, 3D printing and machine perfusion technology in organ transplantation.

=== The Crown television series ===
Chandak directed his transplant team and acted alongside them in Stephen Daldry's television series The Crown. The team performed a simulated operation, replicating the 1951 procedure of lung surgery on George VI, originally carried out by Sir Clement Price Thomas. This is believed to be the first time practicing doctors and surgeons have been directly employed as actors to ensure realism in a television production. It was filmed in a period set at Goldsmiths' Hall in London. The surgical model body of King George VI from the series is now used in the Gordon Museum of Pathology as an aid to surgical training for medical students.

=== 3D printing and paediatric organ transplant ===
Involved with the British Science Association and its Science Festival, Chandak has promoted public engagement of science-inspired projects.

In April 2017, Chandak performed live at The Royal Institution on modern-day surgery, 3D printing, perfusion machines, and antibody-suppressing drugs.

He was invited to speak at The Royal Society on 3 July 2017 on the applications of 3D-printing to complex surgeries. He continues to lecture on 3D printing in transplantation.

=== BBC World Service, The Forum ===
Chandak was invited as one of the key speakers discussing the early history and future innovations of transplant surgery at the BBC World Service Forum in 2017. This programme was timed to coincide with the 50th anniversary of Christiaan Barnard's world's first heart transplant.

=== Charity ===
In 2018, Chandak's project to form a choir of children who have had kidney transplants, secured funding from Children in Need.

== Awards ==
Chandak has been awarded prizes and lectures for his role in 3D printing in transplant surgery, including The Royal Society of Medicine Adrian Tanner Prize, 2013, The Royal College of Surgeons Lister Essay Prize and Medal 2014, The Royal College of Surgeons Ronald Raven Barbers Award 2015, and The Royal College of Surgeons Arnott Lecture and Medal, delivered at the British Transplantation Congress 2016. Chandak was awarded the annual trainee surgical prize for innovation in surgery, the Norman Tanner Medal, by the Royal Society of Medicine in 2016. In addition to 3D printing in transplant surgery, he presented at this award session, outcomes in paediatric kidney transplantation surgery.

In 2016, for applications, design, and innovation of surgical technology and instruments, Chandak described himself and his team as 'fortunate' to receive the Royal College of Surgeons and Worshipful Company of Cutlers' Medal and Cutlers' Prize 2016. In 2017, he received the inaugural International Paediatric Transplant Young Scholar Award which was presented in Barcelona at the International Paediatric Transplant Association.

Chandak has an interest in the history of medicine and has delivered lectures on Joseph Lister and the 'surgical journey from scalpels to robots'. In June 2017, he delivered The Goodall Memorial Lecture to commemorate the 150th anniversary of Joseph Lister's antiseptic legacy, held at the Royal College of Physicians and Surgeons of Glasgow as part of the Glasgow Science Festival. He has in addition been awarded The British Science Association Charles Darwin Award Lecture 2017 delivered at the British Science Festival in Sept 2017. In 2023, Chandak was awarded the Hunterian Professorship by the RCSE.

== Personal ==
Chandak cites scientists Joseph Lister and Michael Faraday as influences, as well as his father, Balkishan Chandak, who worked as a general practitioner for many years.

== Selected publications ==
- Chandak, P. Chapter 9.1.1- Organ Donation
- Mahadevan V and Chandak P. Surgical Anatomy of the Pelvis and Perineum. Journal of the Royal Army Medical Corps Armed Forces 2013 Mar;159 Supp 1:i10-4
- Chandak P and Callaghan C. Immunology of Organ Transplantation. Surgery. July 2014.
