= Gordon Museum of Pathology =

Medical museum in London, England

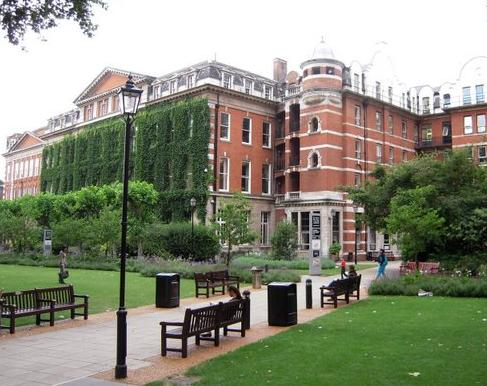
- The Gordon Museum, Hodgkin Building
- Established: 1905
- Location: London, United Kingdom
- Coordinates: 51.502800°N 0.089629°W
- Type: Medical, University museum
- Curator: William Edwards

The Gordon Museum of Pathology is a medical museum dedicated to human specimens in London, England. It is one of the largest pathology museums in the world and is part of King's College London. The museum is used for medical teaching and is not open to the public.

== History ==
The Gordon Museum was opened in 1905 at King's Guy's Campus as a result of a donation by British lawyer Robert Gordon, and was intended to be a teaching resource devoted purely to human material.

A number of specimens and other medical-related objects have been collected since 1802, and were initially gathered by the first Medical Curator Thomas Hodgkin. These formed the basis of the museum in the first Medical School opened in 1826. In 1829, the museum contained approximately 3000 exhibits, and by 1861, the London Journal of Medicine reported that "the Museums are on a scale which entitles them to rank among the first of our national collections."

== Collections ==
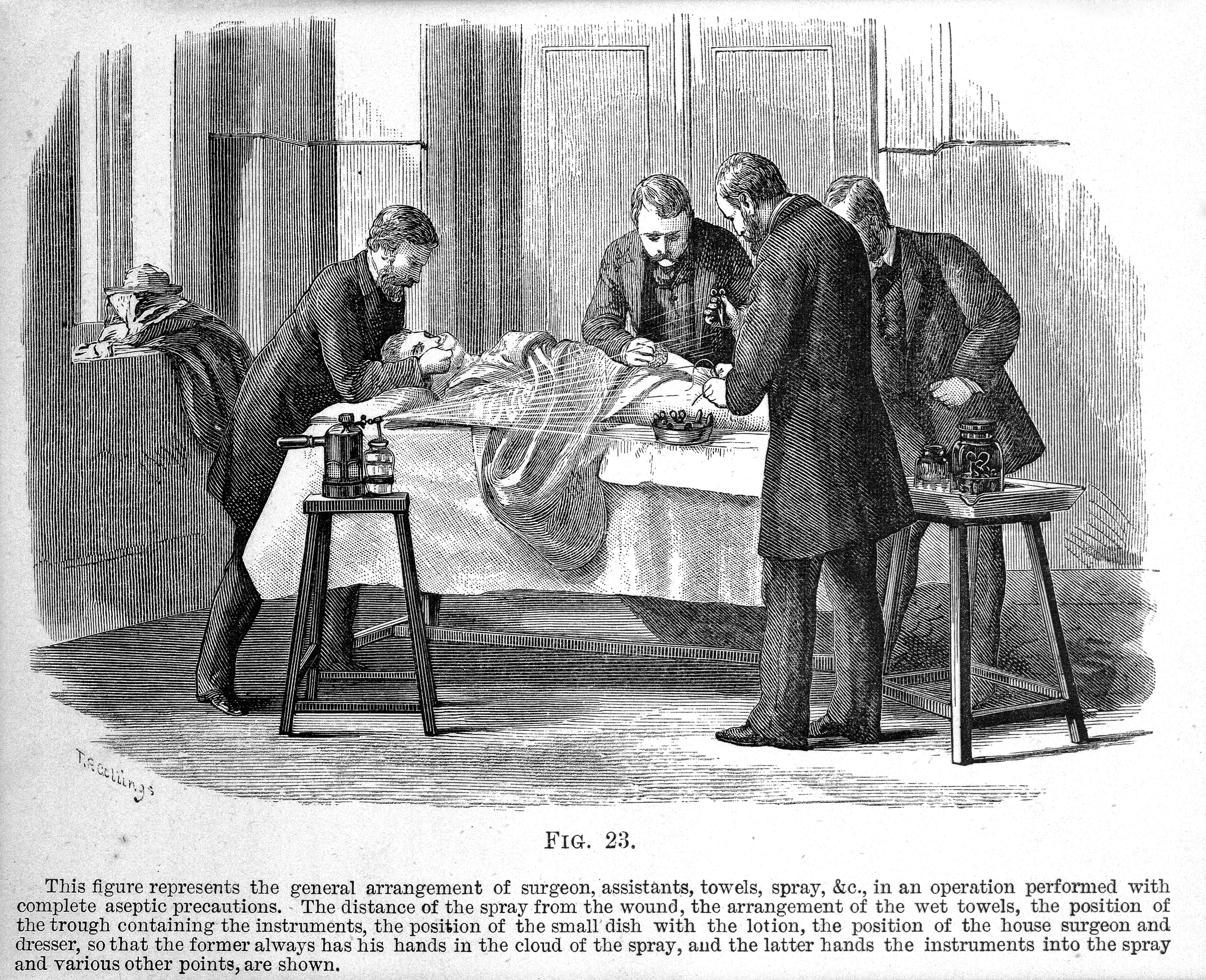
Use of the Lister's antiseptic spray in 1882

The Gordon Museum holds a collection of approximately 8000 pathological specimens, artefacts, models and paintings, and the earliest specimens are from circa 1608. The Museum contains many human specimens that have impacted on the development of medical studies, including Astley Cooper’s ligation of the abdominal aorta, and the original specimens of kidneys, adrenal glands and lymph nodes which led Thomas Hodgkin, Thomas Addison and Richard Bright to describe the medical conditions that bear their names.

The Museum also houses a number of historic collections and artefacts, for example Joseph Lister's antiseptic spray, and Thomas Hodgkin's stethoscope that was the first to be used in England. The Joseph Towne's anatomical and dermatological wax models and Lam Qua's pre-operative tumour paintings are as well displayed in the museum.

The museum is home to the mummified remains of Alan Billis, a former taxi driver who agreed to be mummified as part of research into ancient Egyptian practices.

== Key people ==
=== Curators ===
- Thomas Hodgkin, British physician, pioneer in preventive medicine (1825-1837)
- Thomas Wilkinson King, regarded by some as the 'Father of Endocrinology' (1837-1847)
- John Birkett (1851-1852)
- Samuel Osborne Habershon, English physician (1853-1856)
- Walter Moxon (1865-1873)
- Charles Hilton Fagge, English physician (1873-1882)
- James Goodhart, English physician and paediatrician (1882-1887)
- George Newton Pitt (1887-1889)
- Lauriston Elgie Shaw (1889 -1904)
- John Fawcett (1904-1913)
- Robert Davies Colley (1913-1946)
- Keith Simpson, English forensic pathologist (1946-1965)
- Sigiberto Jose De Navasquez (1965-1970)
- John Maynard (1970-1996)
- Sebastian Lucas (1996-2003)
- William Edwards (2003–present)

=== Artist in residence ===
- Eleanor Crook, anatomical modeller and sculptor (2007–present)
