= JWR =

JWR may refer to:

- Jewish World Review
- Jody Wilson-Raybould
- Johore Wooden Railway
- Jinhua–Wenzhou Railway
- Junior world record
- Jurassic World Rebirth
- J. W. Roberts Ltd., a defunct company involved in the Armley asbestos disaster
