= List of waste disposal incidents =

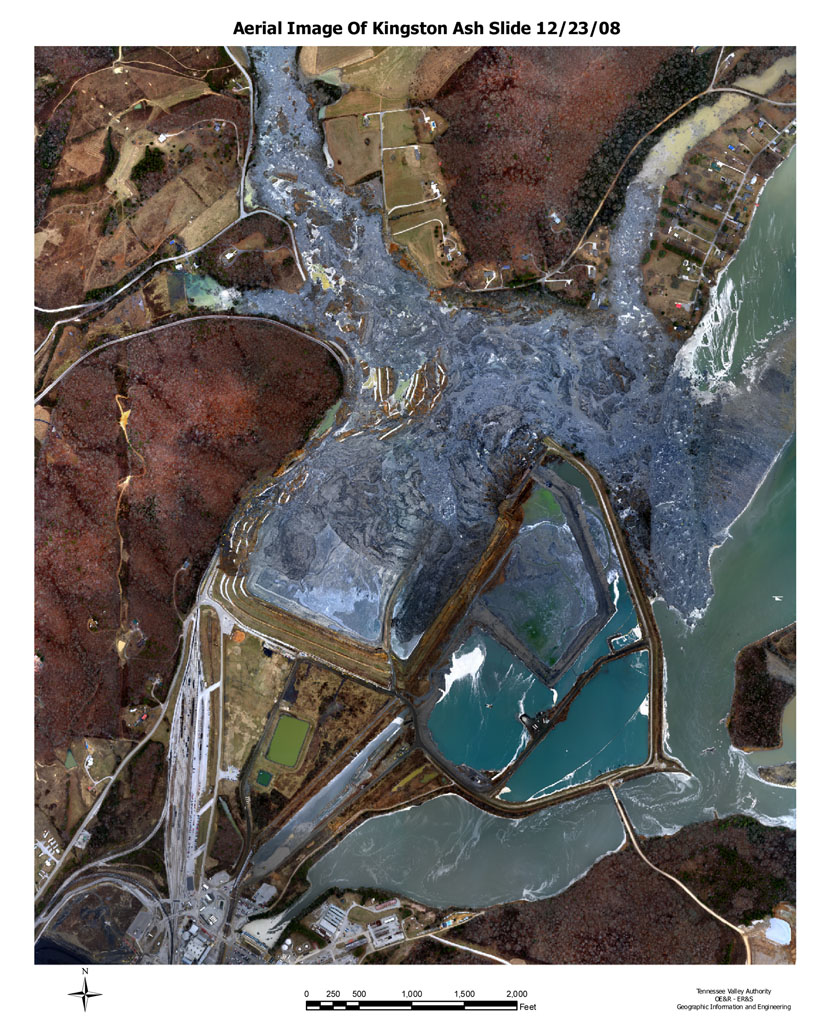
The Kingston Fossil Plant coal fly ash slurry spill viewed a day after the event.

This is a list of notable waste disposal incidents.

Incident	Description	Date	Location
Aberfan disaster	coal waste spill	1966	United Kingdom
Acerinox accident	radioactive contamination	1998	Spain
Agriculture Street Landfill			United States
Ajka alumina plant accident	caustic waste spill	2010	Hungary
Atari video game burial		1983	United States
Bajzë Rail Station	chemical contamination	1991	Albania
Bellevue solvent recycling plant	chemical contamination	2001	Australia
Buffalo Creek Flood	coal slurry impound spill	1972	United States
Corby toxic waste case			United Kingdom
2006 Côte d'Ivoire toxic waste dump		2006	Côte d'Ivoire
Cuyahoga River			United States
Friendly Floatees	flotsam	1992	Ocean
Goiânia accident	radioactive contamination	1987	Brazil
Hansa Carrier	flotsam	1990	Ocean
Khian Sea waste disposal incident		1986	
Kingston Fossil Plant coal fly ash slurry spill	coal fly ash slurry spill	2008	United States
2015 Gold King Mine waste water spill	acid mine waste spill	2015	United States
Gold mine at Kingston, Queensland	toxic waste		Australia
Lake Karachay	radioactive waste dump site		Russia
Love Canal	toxic waste dump		United States
Māpua contaminated site	toxic waste	1932-88	New Zealand
Martin County sludge spill	water pollution	2000	United States
Mayapuri	radioactive contamination	1986	India
McFarland incident	toxic waste	2000	South Korea
Minamata Bay mercury poisoning	cause of Minamata disease	1932-68	Japan
Mobro 4000 garbage barge		1987	United States
Munisport			United States
Radioactive waste dumping by the 'Ndrangheta	radioactive waste		Italy
Saint John, New Brunswick harbour cleanup	sewerage		Canada
Seveso disaster	toxic pollutant	1976	Italy
Spodden Valley asbestos controversy		2004	United Kingdom
Sydney Tar Ponds	hazardous waste		Canada
Syringe Tide		1987-88	United States
Techa River	radioactive contamination		Russia
Teckomatorp		1970s	Sweden
Times Beach, Missouri	dioxin scare	1983	United States
Tonoshō, Kagawa	industrial waste dump		Japan
Tui mine tailings dam			New Zealand
DuPont Washington Works	perfluorooctanoic acid dump	1951-2003	United States
Valley of the Drums	toxic waste dump		United States
View-Master factory supply well			United States

== See also ==
- List of environmental issues
- List of years in the environment
