= Armley asbestos disaster =

Asbestos contamination

Coordinates: 53°48′00″N 1°35′03″W

An aerial view of Armley. The most heavily contaminated housing area is enclosed by the yellow box. The red box encloses the former Midland Works asbestos factory.

The Armley asbestos disaster is a public health problem originating in Armley, a suburb of Leeds, West Yorkshire, England. Described by Dr. Geoffrey Tweedale as a "social disaster", it involved the contamination with asbestos dust of an area consisting of around 1,000 houses in the Armley Lodge area of the city.

The contamination was the result of the activities of a local asbestos factory, part of the Turner & Newall (T&N) group (often referred to by the name of its founders, J. W. Roberts Ltd.) and occurred between the end of the 19th century and 1959 when the factory eventually closed. At its peak the factory had 250 employees. At least 300 former employees are believed to have died from asbestos-related illnesses, and a number of cancer deaths in the Armley area were traced to the factory in 1988 as a result of an investigation by the Yorkshire Evening Post. The estate was found to have the highest incidence in the country of mesothelioma. As the interval between exposure and diagnosis can be up to 50 years the number of further deaths which may occur due to the factory's emissions or residual dust since its closure cannot be predicted.

== Background ==
J. W. Roberts Ltd. was founded in Armley in 1855 as a textile producer, primarily working with cotton, hemp and jute. By 1906, its factory on Canal Road, known as the Midland Works, specialised in the manufacture of asbestos insulation mattresses for steam locomotive boilers and is believed to have been one of only two factories in the world at the time which processed blue asbestos. In 1920 it merged with Turner Brothers Asbestos Company Ltd., Newalls Insulation Company Ltd., and the Washington Chemical Company Ltd., to form Turner & Newall Ltd., which in 1925 became a public company. T&N's rapid growth has been attributed to a product called "Sprayed Limpet Asbestos", developed in the Armley works in 1931. This was made by mixing raw asbestos with water and cement, the resulting slurry being spray applied to the surface to be insulated, creating a cheap soundproof and extremely fire resistant coating. Sprayed Limpet Asbestos generated huge profits for T&N who exported the product to 60 countries where it was applied to a wide range of buildings including schools, churches and theatres and the London Underground; the factory at Armley closed in 1959.

== Asbestos dust emissions ==
Midland Works emitted vast quantities of asbestos dust, primarily through its ventilation system, which covered the nearby streets and rooftops of surrounding houses. One resident told of how his wife "used to wipe the greyish white dust off the window sills of their home at 9.30 am, and that an hour later, if the machines at Roberts were blowing out dust, there would be another layer of dust half an inch thick."

It was not uncommon until the factory's closure for children to be seen playing in the dust in the streets and the local school's playground, making 'snowballs' which were thrown in ignorance of the danger they posed. Others used the thick layer of dust in the playground to mark out hopscotch squares.

In subsequent legal hearings, residents testified how: "If you walked right behind the factory it was like cotton. It was in the cracks in the pavement behind the factory;" and: "It used to be blue-white. We used to sweep this blue dust up. It was blue fluffy stuff ... I used to get up in the morning and the other side of the street always had a layer of fine dust with footmarks on it from the early morning workers." Of the conditions in the nearby school one said: "The dust was always there while I was at school, lying on walls or window ledges if it had been damp. It was like snow fall." Describing the loading bay, to which local children had easy access, one witness recalled: "Sometimes sacks were left out overnight. They were hessian sacks and they were full of a sort of fluffy dust. We could jump on the sacks when they were left out... I remember seeing grey-blue coloured dust come out of them. If we jumped hard enough the sacks burst open. After sitting or bouncing on the sacks I remember being covered in dust." During the summer doors and windows of both the factory and the houses were left open for cooling, and during the winter children often congregated around the factory's street-level ventilation outlets for warmth.

=== Residual contamination ===
In 1974, after reviewing company documents about Midland Works, a T&N public relations officer wrote: "I hope very much indeed that we are never called upon to discuss Armley in the public arena." In 1978, however, Leeds City Council informed T&N that the factory was still "badly contaminated" with asbestos, with dust found in the basement, lift shaft, roof, ventilation shafts and beneath the floors. Hessian sacks containing asbestos fibre were still present, and the yard was filled with 'a few hundred tonnes' of blue asbestos waste mixed with soil. R. D. Lunt, T&N's Safety and Environment manager, wrote of the factory basement: "Every nook and cranny has asbestos fibre in it". T&N contributed £15,000 towards the clean-up of the factory, and claimed they were doing so out of "a moral, not a legal responsibility" to do so. The surrounding houses and buildings were not included in this operation, and Leeds City Council and T&N "agreed to keep the whole matter 'low-key' if approached by the media", while a T&N internal memo stated "The Principal Inspector of Factories and the Assistant Director of Environmental Health are anxious to play this down and have given us considerable support."

Documents discovered by lawyers in the 1990s revealed that in 1979 T&N were also notified of asbestos contamination in a house in Aviary Road that had once been part of the Midland Works after the city's Public Analyst found asbestos in an attic and garden, and an internal T&N memo about this stated "... presumably it is reasonable to suppose that adjoining properties might also be involved." Leeds City Council did not inform the public. T&N paid for the decontamination of the property in Aviary Road but "secured an understanding that 'any reference to the proximity of the buildings to the old JW Roberts factory will now be omitted from the Land Registry Records'" and all such references were then removed by Leeds City Council. They then began to prepare "dossiers on 'likely attackers' and journalists with a 'special interest' in asbestos." In 1992, when asked to comment about contamination in Aviary Road T&N said: "T&N has not been made aware of any evidence linking that asbestos with JW Roberts's former factory."

== Yorkshire Evening Post investigation ==
During the 1970s the incidence of mesothelioma in former workers at the factory began to rise, but cases were also being found in people who had never worked for T&N, although they had lived in the vicinity of Midland Works or had relatives who were former employees. In 1987 Richard Taylor, a journalist with the Yorkshire Evening Post, began checking through the coroner's court reports, examining death certificates and interviewing relatives and neighbours of the deceased. As a result, Taylor was able to demonstrate a pattern "of an incredibly high incidence of mesothelioma deaths in Armley around the Roberts factory." Philip Sanderson Gill, the coroner, agreed with the findings, and said: "It was only as a trend over a number of years that a more precise picture appeared. I have very few other cases from other areas of Leeds. It is significant that virtually all the cases we have come from that area." The Yorkshire Evening Post produced a series of articles about the ongoing contamination and disease, which they dubbed the "Armley Asbestos Tragedy".

=== Parliamentary debate ===
Taylor met with John Battle, then the Member of Parliament for Leeds West, in 1987 to present his findings, and Battle raised the matter in a House of Commons debate. Along with Leeds City Council, he called for a public inquiry into the deaths at Armley, but the incumbent Conservative government under Margaret Thatcher rejected the request, on the grounds that it "would cause needless concern, that it was impossible to discover what had happened at Roberts, and that no one could then have imagined that the dust could have harmed residents." Battle submitted to the House: "I cannot believe that those who owned and ran Roberts can have gone in and out without seeing the dust everywhere on the surrounding streets and pavements. If they knew that their workers within had to be protected from the asbestos dust, how could they have ignored the position of their neighbours who lived with that dust outside? It was not rendered neutral or innocuous as it left their premises. If they knew, why did they knowingly continue to ask not only their employees but local residents for a generation to pay the price with their lives for the profits of continued asbestos production? ...Should not the company be responsible for that deadly legacy? The Armley asbestos tragedy cannot remain private and hidden because it is not yet over."

=== 'Civic conscience' ===
Walley (2003) stressed the importance of the role played by the Yorkshire Evening Post and the local MP, John Battle in sustaining interest in the Armley story for several years, from the discovery of the associated deaths, largely the work of Taylor at the Post, up until the case finally reached court. Without downplaying the later efforts of such organisations, Walley believed it noteworthy that the Post was championing the cause "significantly before the emergence of any residents organisation" and sees their persistence as evidence that "behind the front page headlines there was at work a 'civic conscience' committed to the revelation and exposure of something very significant to the city as a whole," rather than a superficial, immediate coverage focusing predominantly on "the spectacular effects of eco-disasters." Between 1988 and 1992, he says, "the development of the issues of the tragedy seem almost an elite affair between local journalists and the local M.P." and dealt with the "reality... which may be intrinsically long term and whose complexity goes considerably beyond the human interest aspects of the spectacular."

=== Yorkshire Television ===
On 20 July 1982, Yorkshire Television broadcast the documentary Alice - A Fight For Life, predominantly the story of Alice Jefferson, who had worked at the Acre Mill asbestos factory in Hebden Bridge for just nine months when she was 17 years old. Thirty years later she was diagnosed with mesothelioma and given only six months to live. The documentary was also an "exposé on the workings of the asbestos industry." Its broadcast resulted in £60 million being knocked off T&N's share price overnight, headlines in the national newspapers, and the setting up of a government enquiry. Within ten days the government had halved the legal limit for asbestos dust in the workplace. In 1988 Yorkshire Television picked up the Yorkshire Evening Post story and produced a second critical investigation focusing on the pattern of deaths in Armley, and contradicting the government's reasons for refusing an inquiry. Called Too Close to Home, it was broadcast as part of the First Tuesday documentary series on 6 December 1988.

== City Council responses ==
Leeds City Council commissioned a report into the deaths from the Department of Public Health at the University of Leeds. The council also began a survey of some of the houses in the neighbourhood, looking for residual contamination. Asbestos dust was found to be present in the roofing, cellars and window sashes. As a result, a warning letter was sent to all residents informing them of the possibility of asbestos contamination in their homes and the need for specialised decontamination. When asked, the Minister for Housing and Planning, Sir George Young, responded that the government would not provide financial assistance to the home owners or the council to pay for decontamination, as this "would not be a justifiable use of public funds." In further tests between 1998 - 2001 the council surveyed 364 houses adjacent to Midland Works. Residual asbestos contamination was found in 363 of the properties tested. As of November 2008, a further 610 properties had been tested and found to contain residual asbestos dust, and decontaminated at a cost of £9.3 million.

== T&N response ==
T&N's chairman Sir Colin Hope, writing on 25 October 1989, claimed that after the company vacated and sold the premises in 1959, it had ceased to keep any records relating to the operation, that it held no archived records, and what records might still exist would be "extremely scanty" (sic) and "largely confined to basic employee record cards." John Battle MP addressed the House of Commons on 8 July 1992 regarding the difficulties faced in mounting a legal case against T&N: "Basically, it is an attempt legally to prove negligence in the face of foreseeable likelihood that harm would occur as a result of causing or permitting asbestos dust to permeate the atmosphere in or around the factory premises in Canal Road, Armley, between 1925 and 1958... The legal test is whether the company knew that the dust could cause serious or possibly fatal injury to those living in the 840 houses nearby who work in the local workplaces or who attend the Armley Clock school... I have reason to believe that the company and other sources, medical and environmental, did have that sort of data, and still do. The difficulty lies in seeking it out - discovering it - and, especially, forcing the company to disclose all that it knew and knows."

=== Obstruction ===
T&N allegedly sought wherever possible to delay proceedings, including slowing and obstructing the process of disclosure of documents, by claiming that "within the interlocking structure of companies T&N could not be construed as liable for its subsidiary’s actions" and by conduct, as the judge later ruled, "reflecting a wish to contest these claims by any means possible, legitimate or otherwise... simply to obstruct the plaintiff’s road." In parallel with the delaying tactics, T&N pursued "a resilient re-affirmation of the safety of asbestos products and manufacturing processes" in the press, spending £500,000 on PR in just six weeks.

In a speech to the Commons on 21 February 1994 John Battle outlined the extent of the delays with disclosure, describing how an order for certain documents to be disclosed had been made by the judge in September 1992, to which T&N applied for permission to appeal in March 1993. The appeal was heard on 9 December 1993 at which point T&N decided to drop their appeal. Then on 8 February 1994 they applied for their time for the compliance to be extended until 1 May 1994, followed by a claim that, "as they are to put all their records on computer and are to use an American company to do it, it would be too difficult for them to comply with that order. They said that the preliminary search work and drawing up of computer specifications cannot be completed until the beginning of July [1994] and that the real process of making the documentation available may not happen until 1995."

=== Disowning Midland Works ===
In 1993, Sir Colin Hope stated: "...[T]he factory in question was not owned or operated by this Company. It was owned and operated by a company known as J.W. Roberts Limited ("JWR"). JWR ceased production at that factory in 1958/59, and vacated and sold the premises shortly thereafter. Although JWR continued in business for some time after leaving the Armley site, the company ceased to trade over twenty years ago... I am aware of the various comments and allegations that have been made about JWR's Armley factory, particularly as the source of the contamination to which you refer. Those comments and allegations are not accepted." In the Commons, John Battle responded that he was in possession of correspondence "in which the same T&N plc sought to convince Her Majesty's Inspector of Taxes that, for tax purposes, J.W. Roberts of Armley was still in business as an integral part of T&N and should be taken into account when calculating tax reductions. Is it too cynical to suggest that JWR is counted in only for profits, but discounted when it comes to its responsibility for local lives?"

== Chase Manhattan Bank v T&N ==
In 1987 Chase Manhattan Bank (Chase) began legal proceedings against T&N in the United States. Chase claimed compensatory and punitive damages from T&N for the hazard created at Chase's corporate headquarters by the presence of spray applicated asbestos fireproofing materials. In the United Kingdom, John Battle had complained to Parliament that securing documents from T&N was causing progress with the Armley victims' cases to stall, with "documents shifted around from one subsidiary to another within the parent group. Lawyers are expected to specify exactly what records they want without knowing what the company holds. Even if they manage to specify particular records, such as reports on the escape of dust from the factory and tested measurements of asbestos levels within the factory or in the surrounding area - even details of the factory's structure and its ventilation system - those documents are either outwith the rules of discovery or the reply comes back that the records no longer exist." But as the Chase case progressed, around two million T&N documents, many of which had previously been unseen by British solicitors and historians, were uncovered by the discovery process and research in the US.

=== Michael O'Connor ===
The bank's Vice President Michael O'Connor, himself a senior lawyer, recognised the value of the documents, which dated back as far as the 1920s, and, as no protective order had been placed on them which would have prevented their disclosure to third parties, "began sending large bundles of key T&N documents to the media, lawyers, doctors, victims' support groups and historians." As well as forming the basis for two BBC documentaries, "Deadly Legacy" (broadcast 14 April 1993) and "An Acceptable Level of Death" (14 April 1994) and two BBC Radio 4 programmes, "The Shocking Story of Asbestos" (6 October 1993) and "Asbestos and the Third World" (13 October 1993), the documents provided crucial information to lawyers in the U.K. who had previously been told that such information was no longer kept, and also revealed how early the company had known about the real risks of asbestos. Other documents included a 1964 T&N memorandum describing the growing public awareness that asbestos caused cancer as a "sinister development" and a document about new safety regulations which said: "If, however, we demonstrate by a token effort only an ostensible intention to comply with the regulations, it is conceivable that we can ward off the evil day when asbestos cannot be economically applied."

In 1995 O'Connor was awarded the Freedom of Information Award in the UK, presented by Tony Blair, in recognition of "his remarkable efforts to supply British victims of asbestos diseases with documents needed for their compensation claims."

== Margereson v J. W. Roberts Ltd. and Hancock v J. W. Roberts Ltd. ==
Arthur Margereson was born in 1925 and lived approximately 200 yards away from Midland Works. Although he never worked at the factory, he lived all of his life in the same property in Armley except during his wartime military service, commencing in 1943, returning to the house after his service had ended. In September 1990 he was diagnosed with mesothelioma. Although legal action was commenced in 1990, Margereson died from his cancer in 1991, and the case subsequently involved his widow, Evelyn, under the Fatal Accidents Act 1976 and on behalf of her husband's estate under the Law Reform (Miscellaneous Provisions) Act 1934. The case suffered many delays and setbacks, particularly due to the obstructive actions of the defendants, who for two years had resisted access to internal company documents which demonstrated they were aware of the risk in 1933, and was still unresolved by the time it was combined with the case of a second victim of environmental exposure, June Hancock, in 1994. Although separate cases, they were heard as one. A third plaintiff, David Young, died of his cancer in December 1993, but had no surviving family to continue his action against the company. A further 12 victims who were previously seeking compensation from T&N had also died before their cases reached court.

June Hancock had also grown up next to the Midland Works, and had never worked inside the factory. Her mother died of mesothelioma in 1982, and June was diagnosed with the cancer herself in 1993. Hancock instructed a solicitor shortly after she was diagnosed and the writ was issued on 5 September 1994. The two cases were heard over six weeks at Leeds High Court in 1995. Despite being in the terminal stage of her illness, Hancock attended court on all but one day of the hearing.

T&N had conceded before the trial that Hancock's and Margereson's illnesses were caused by asbestos from the factory, but any compensation depended on proving that the company knew or should have known the dangers the dust could cause. Three months after the hearing ended Mr. Justice Holland handed down a written judgment, finding for the plaintiffs, and awarded damages of £65,000 to June Hancock and £50,000 to Evelyn Margereson. The judge ruled that the defendant was liable on the grounds that the risks of asbestos dust exposure had been known by the defendant since 1933 and it was foreseeable that children allowed to play in the vicinity of the factory would be exposed to the risk of pulmonary disease. This was a landmark decision, extending as it did the duty of care beyond factory employees to those outside a factory's walls.

The judge said of the emissions from Midland Works: "there is no doubt but that every process in varying degree gave off dust ... There was at all material times, a substantial emission of dust from the factory premises", and that "There was knowledge, sufficient to found reasonable foresight on the part of the Defendants, that children were particularly vulnerable to personal injury arising out of inhalation of asbestos dust ... Reasonably practicable steps were not taken to reduce or prevent inhalation of emitted asbestos dust." Regarding the conduct of the case, Mr Justice Holland accused T&N of trying to obstruct the legal action and to wear Hancock and Margereson down "by attrition". He said they had shown "a wish to contest these claims by any means possible, legitimate or otherwise" and that their lawyers had "remorselessly persisted in taking bad points, apparently simply to obstruct the plaintiffs' road." In a press statement, T&N repeated their claim that they could not have known "so many years ago of the risks to individuals such as these plaintiffs" and said they believed "the judge was wrong to find T&N liable in these cases. The factory closed almost 40 years ago."

Hancock said after the ruling: "The money won't do me much good, but there's no other way they can pay. The only way they can answer for what they did is money." She died on 19 July 1997. A charity, the June Hancock Mesothelioma Research Fund, was established shortly after her death to support victims of mesothelioma and mesothelioma research projects.

=== Appeal ===
T&N applied for leave to appeal in December 1995, and submissions were heard in March 1996 by Lord Justices Russell, Saville and Otton. William Woodward QC, for T&N, submitted that it could never be known when and where a person developed mesothelioma and it could not be determined which particular dust particle produced mesothelioma. On these grounds, T&N should not be held responsible for cancer which could have arisen from asbestos dust produced by another company. Lord Justice Russell responded that the line that had to be drawn was where, outside the factory walls, the risk of personal injury became less than a real possibility and said "It is not a very attractive argument for the factory owner to agree that mountains of asbestos dust were created but these cases of cancer were not the result of that."

The appeal was dismissed on 2 April 1996, and permission to appeal to the House of Lords was refused. Lord Justice Russell rejected T&N's claim that they could not have known of the dangers before 1933 and said: "The true date was much earlier, certainly long before Mr Margereson's birth date [1925]. His activities as a child, therefore, as well as Mrs Hancock's, were at a time when the defendants were on actual or constructive notice as to the potential pulmonary damage that exposure to asbestos dust could bring about."

As a result of the ruling, T&N accepted liability with a further 60 claimants from Armley. The full amount of compensation was never paid out as T&N eventually filed for bankruptcy. There were still hundreds of outstanding cases relating to dust emitted from Midland Works, but plaintiffs' solicitors were informed that as a result of the bankruptcy, all legal actions against T&N and its subsidiaries would be stayed.

== Federal-Mogul ==
In 1998, with 263,000 claims for injury pending, T&N was bought by Federal-Mogul, a multinational auto-parts conglomerate based in Southfield, Michigan, USA. On 1 October 2001, after lobbying efforts for a bailout failed, Federal-Mogul filed for Chapter 11 protection to shield the company from asbestos litigation. This allowed them to "ringfence" their assets and continue trading while not having to meet the asbestos-related claims. At the time, the company's turnover was approximately $6 billion, and its UK group of companies had a turnover of approximately £400 million. Compensation cheques to victims who had won their claims were dishonoured, outstanding court cases placed on hold and an embargo put in place preventing new actions from being launched. Federal-Mogul's chairman Frank Macher, claimed that despite the insolvency: "Federal-Mogul will continue to serve its existing customers, fulfill current contracts and secure new business... Federal-Mogul is continuing business operations without interruption and with the full support of our major customers."

Speaking in the Commons, John Battle MP alleged: "The resort to administration looks like a rearguard action of complex corporate gamesmanship to avoid responsibility for paying out legitimate court-won compensation awards."

=== Lack of valid insurance ===
In the UK, questions were raised over whether T&N had any valid insurance in place. Those insurance companies which could be connected to T&N, such as Royal & Sun Alliance, alleged that their policies excluded liability for asbestos-related claims, although this was in breach of the Employers' Liability (Compulsory Insurance) Act 1969. Insurers stated that instead they had an "understanding" that T&N itself would settle asbestos claims and, "in return for premiums received, the insurers would, however, issue a Certificate of Insurance which complied with the terms of the Employers' Liability Act, thereby enabling T&N to continue trading."

By 2003, no payments had been received by UK claimants and a request to the government to set up an interim compensation scheme was rejected, as was a request to the US Creditors' Committee of Federal-Mogul to make hardship payments to UK victims. As further litigation ensued to test the validity of the insurers' exclusions, public demonstrations were held outside the Manchester offices of Kroll Corporate Advisory & Restructuring Group, the court-appointed Administrators for T&N. Tony Whitston, spokesperson for North-West Asbestos Victims’ Support Groups, said: "Kroll have charged £17 million in fees to date and their solicitors have charged £6 million. The charge out rate for a senior partner at Kroll is £460 per hour. The financial “killing” being made by the Administrators is reducing the resources [£70 million] left to pay dying victims. We think this behaviour is a classic example of corporate greed and callousness."

=== Payment ===
In November 2004, law firms representing 50 successful claimants from Armley secured payment of 24 pence in the pound for their clients. June Hancock's solicitor Adrian Budgen explained that victims were "typically" awarded compensation of £100,000, of which £10,000 was invariably paid back to cover any industrial injury benefits received. The victim would then receive only 24% of the remaining £90,000. He said: "It is a pittance. If we had known in 2001 it was going to take four years I am sure there would have been a much bigger outcry. We just ran into the mire. It was beyond our control. Very much of what was happening was being dictated across the water in the United States." All of the 50 claimants had already died by the time the payments were made.

Further claims of compensation for other victims eventually commenced in 2007 when Federal-Mogul emerged from Chapter 11 bankruptcy. By that time, just £91 million was available for T&N's worldwide non-U.S. asbestos liabilities for the next 40 years. Successful applicants receive as little as 17% of the value of their claims.

=== Post-2007 ===
Rachel Reeves, elected as MP for Leeds West in May 2010, raised the issue of justice for the victims of the asbestos disaster and their families in a series of questions in Parliament. In her maiden speech she said: "There is a real concern that the coalition will use the country's financial deficit as an excuse to unfairly target working people, particularly those who have been left dealing with the devastating effects of exposure to asbestos. With the backing of trade unions and support groups a huge amount of effort has gone into making sure that the voices of asbestos victims and their families are heard by Government and as a result a number of important assurances were made to them at the end of the last Parliament. It's vital those commitments are not reneged upon to the detriment of thousands of asbestos victims across the country."

== Dust ==
June Hancock's story formed the subject of a play, Dust, by Kenneth F. Yates, which was performed in Armley and at the West Yorkshire Playhouse in July 2009.

== See also ==
- Asbestosis
- Turner & Newall
- Spodden Valley asbestos controversy
- Nellie Kershaw
