= Lucy Deane Streatfeild =

British civil servant (1865–1950)

Lucy Deane Streatfeild, CBE
- Lucy Deane Streatfeild photographed in 1918 on being appointed CBE
- Born: 31 July 1865; Madras, India
- Died: 3 July 1950 (aged 84); Westerham, Kent, England
- Occupations: Civil servant, social worker

Lucy Anne Evelyn (Deane) Streatfeild, CBE (31 July 1865 – 3 July 1950) was a civil servant, a social worker, and one of the first female factory inspectors in the United Kingdom; she was one of the first to raise concerns about the health risks arising from exposure to asbestos.

== Biography ==
Lucy Deane was the daughter of Lieutenant-Colonel Bonar Millett Deane and the Hon. Lucy Boscawen (the sister of Evelyn Boscawen, 6th Viscount Falmouth), and was born in Madras, India, on 31 July 1865.

== Life ==
Deane was born in 1865. Four years after the death of her mother she became involved in 1890 with a charity called the National Health Society that provided training. In 1893 she and Rose Squire became Britain's first women sanitary inspectors. They were based in Kensington and they inspected businesses that employed women. Squire became a factory inspector in 1894 and Deane followed a year later.

She married architect Granville Edward Stewart Streatfeild (1869-1947) DSO, OBE on 16 March 1911. She was appointed a Commander of the Order of the British Empire in the 1918 New Year Honours.

Deane was a supporter of the suffrage movement, being both a member of the National Union of Women's Suffrage Societies and, in 1913, helping to organise a suffrage pilgrimage from Westerham and district, to the union's rally of 50,000 women in Hyde Park.

Amongst her other interests, Deane was a leading member of the Women's Institute (founding a local branch in Westerham), and was involved in amateur theatre production.

Lucy Deane died on 3 July 1950 in Westerham, Kent, three years after the death of her husband.

== Career ==
Deane first worked as a nursing sister, having been trained at the National Health Society and Chelsea Infirmary. She qualified as a sanitary inspector and in 1893 was appointed by the Borough of Kensington. She and former classmate Rose Squire were the first female sanitary inspectors in London. Alice Ravenhill was another classmate. From 1894 until 1906 she worked for the Home Office as a factory inspector. One of the people she inspired was Annie Jane Duncan who was an Australian visitor looking for work. Duncan trained and worked as a factory inspector who return to Australia as maybe their first woman factory inspector.

In 1901, Deane was appointed to the Fawcett Commission, the committee of inquiry into the concentration camps created following the Second Boer War, where she ensured that the committee's report included criticism of the camps system. From 1912 until 1915, Deane was a member of the Royal Commission on the Civil Service.

Deane was on the executive committee of the Women's Land Army in Kent during the First World War, and was appointed as a member of both the War Office appeals committee (for the settlement of disputes regarding Separation Allowances for soldiers dependents) and a special arbitration tribunal (for wages of women munition workers).

In 1918, Deane chaired a committee of inquiry into allegations of immoral conduct by members of the Women's Army Auxiliary Corps (WAAC) in France. The report of this committee dismissed as "slanderous and untrue" certain rumours about the misbehaviour of the WAAC in France and went on to explain, and make recommendations designed to alleviate, the problems then faced by women in active service abroad.

In 1920 Deane Streatfeild was among the first women appointed as a Justice of the Peace. She served on the Kent County Council.

== Warnings of the dangers of asbestos ==
In 1898, during her appointment to the inspectorate, Deane was one of the first people in the UK to warn of the harmful effects of asbestos, writing that asbestos occupations were to be observed "on account of their easily demonstrated danger to the health of workers and because of ascertained cases of injury to bronchial tubes and lungs medically attributed to the employment of the sufferer".

Deane further wrote that

"the evil effects of asbestos dust have also instigated a microscopic examination of the mineral dust by HM Medical Inspector. Clearly revealed was the sharp glass-like jagged nature of the particles, and where they are allowed to rise and to remain suspended in the air of the room in any quantity, the effects have been found to be injurious as might have been expected."

Lucy Deane's warnings about the health risks, published as Report on the health of workers in asbestos and other dusty trades (1898), and the later reports made by other Women Inspectors of Factories appeared in the annual reports of HM Chief Inspector of Factories, but were ignored. It was not until 1911 that clinical evidence was gathered to indicate a connection to asbestos exposure.

== See also ==
- Nellie Kershaw, Rochdale factory worker and first case of pulmonary asbestosis described in medical literature
- Spodden Valley asbestos controversy
