= Novation =

Legal concept of substituting a new contract for an old one

Novation, in contract law and business law, is the act of –

1. replacing an obligation to perform with another obligation; or
2. adding an obligation to perform; or
3. replacing a party to an agreement with a new party.

In international law, novation is the acquisition of territory by a sovereign state through "the gradual transformation of a right in territorio alieno [in foreign territory] into full sovereignty without any formal and unequivocal instrument to that effect intervening".

== History ==
"Novation", as a legal term, is derived from the Roman law, in which novatio was of three kinds: substitution of a new debtor (expromissio, or delegatio), of a new creditor (cessio nominum vel actionum), or of a new contract. The term was used by Henry de Bracton, a thirteenth-century English cleric and jurist.

The 1911 Encyclopædia Britannica notes that in English law

"the term ... is scarcely naturalized, the substitution of a new debtor or creditor being generally called an assignment, and of a new contract a merger. It is doubtful, however, whether merger applies except where the substituted contract is one of a higher nature, as where a contract under seal supersedes a simple contract. Where one contract is replaced by another, it is of course necessary that the new contract should be a valid contract, founded upon sufficient consideration ... The extinction of the previous contract is sufficient consideration. The question whether there is a novation most frequently arises in the course of dealing between a customer and a new partnership, and on the assignment of the business of a life assurance company with reference to the assent of the policyholders to the transfer of their policies. The points on which novation turns are whether the new firm or company has assumed the liability of the old, and whether, the creditor has consented to accept the liability of the new debtors and discharge the old. The question is one of fact in each case. See especially the Life Assurance Companies Act 1872, s. 7, where the word "novations" occurs in the marginal note to the section, and so has quasi-statutory sanction."

Under English case law, "discussions about novation to another company" which do not reach fruition will not be taken as evidence of a novation. Consent to a novation can be implied by conduct.

Scottish law seems to be more stringent than English law in the application of the doctrine of novation, and to need stronger evidence of the creditor's consent to the transfer of liability.

In American law, the term is something of a novelty, except in Louisiana, where much of the civil law is retained.

== Novation vs. assignment ==
In contrast to an assignment, which is generally valid as long as the other party is given notice (except where the obligation is specific to the obligor, as in a personal service contract with a specific ballet dancer, or where assignment would place a new and special burden on the counterparty), a novation is valid only with the consent of all parties to the original agreement. A contract transferred by the novation process transfers all duties and obligations from the original obligor to the new obligor.

== Examples of novation ==
For example, if there exists a contract whereby Dan will give a TV to Alex, and another contract whereby Alex will give a TV to Becky, then, it is possible to novate both contracts and replace them with a single contract wherein Dan agrees to give a TV to Becky. In contrast to assignment, novation requires the consent of all parties. Consideration is still required for the new contract, but it is usually assumed to be the discharge of the former contract.

Another classic example is when Company A enters a contract with Company B and a novation is included to ensure that if Company B sells, merges or transfers the core of their business to another company, the new company assumes the obligations and liabilities that Company B has with Company A under the contract. So in terms of the contract, a purchaser, merging party or transferee of Company B steps into the shoes of Company B with respect to its obligations to Company A. Alternatively, a "novation agreement" may be signed after the original contract in the event of such a change. This is common in contracts with governmental entities, an example being under the United States federal Anti-Assignment Act, where the governmental entity that originally issued the contract must agree to such a transfer or it is automatically invalid by law. Federal Acquisition Regulation 42.1204 covers the applicability of novation agreements when they are allowed as consistent with the interests of the government, and notes that "when it is in the Government's interest not to concur" the original obligor will retain responsibility for contractual performance.

The conditions for novation comprise the obligee's acceptance of the new obligor, the new obligor's acceptance of the liability, and the old obligor's acceptance of the new contract as full performance of the old contract, referred to in some cases as a "novation package". Novation is not a unilateral contract mechanism, hence allows room for negotiation on the new T&Cs under the new circumstances. Thus, 'acceptance of the new contract as full performance of the old contract' may be read in conjunction to the phenomenon of 'mutual agreement of the T&Cs'.

Novation is a common practice for design and build construction projects, where a design team is initially appointed by the client to undertake initial studies or prepare a more detailed design, but then when a contractor is appointed with a brief to complete the design and construct the building, the design contract is novated to the contractor. In the case of Galliford Try v Mott MacDonald (2008), the contracting parties had been discussing a novation of this kind but had not actually agreed it. Akenhead J therefore held that no novation had taken place. However, in Enterprise Managed Services Limited v Tony McFadden Utilities (2009) the fact that "large sums of money" had been paid to Tony McFadden provided a basis for the court to imply that a novation had actually taken place.

== International law ==
Novation is also a means of acquiring title in international law. Examples include

- Orkney and the Shetland Islands, which were pledged to Scotland by the King of Norway in lieu of a debt in 1468. They were annexed by Scotland in 1472;
- Corsica, which was only pledged to France by the Republic of Genoa in a treaty of 1768; and
- Belize, which was originally only a grant of logging rights to the British by Spain in the Treaty of Paris (1763).

Some cases, like that of Belize, remain controversial.
