= Granville Edward Stewart Streatfeild =

Architect and war hero

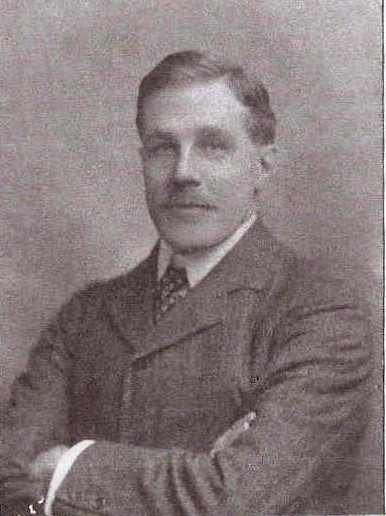
- Born: 11 March 1869; Howick, Northumberland
- Died: 18 September 1947 (aged 78)
- Occupation: Architect
- Spouse: Lucy Deane Streatfeild
- Father: William Champion Streatfeild
- Relatives: William Streatfeild (brother)

Granville Edward Stewart Streatfeild, FRIBA, DSO, OBE (11 March 1869 – 18 September 1947) was an architect in the early twentieth century as well as a war hero. He was a descendant of the Streatfeild family.

== Family and Early Life ==
Granville was the fourth son of Rev William Champion Streatfeild (1839–1912) and Selina Frances Diana Leveson-Gower (1840–1916). He was born on 11th March 1869 at Howick Rectory, Howick, Northumberland where his father was rector. He was known in the family as "John". The family were in Ryton-on-Tyne from 1878 to 1881 where his father was rector of Holy Cross Church. In 1881 the family moved to Kings Worthy, Hampshire. His eldest brother William Streatfeild was Bishop of Lewes.

Granville was at school at Marlborough College, Wiltshire. He studied architecture in London and became an F.R.I.B.A. He practiced this profession until the day of his death, in London until the outbreak of war in 1939, and afterwards from his home at Westerham.

Always deeply interested in social work, as a young man he worked for boys’ clubs in the East End of London and was later on the National Council of Social Service.

In 1891 he was with his parents at Frant Rectory, and was an Architect’s Assistant, and was still there in 1901 and was by then an Architect.

== Architect ==
Granville sought practical experience with Messrs Dyers, builders of Alton, in 1886, before spending a short time as a pupil of M Dentau of Evian les Bains in the following year. Later that same year, 1887, he was articled to William Oswald Milne in London. He joined Sir Reginald Theodore Blomfield as an improver in 1890 and became assistant to Sir Thomas Graham Jackson in 1891, and studied at the RA Schools.

Granville commenced independent practice in 1893 in London. He was a member of the Sevenoaks Rural District Council.

During this period he was the architect for a number of Sussex churches. The following are some that he designed: Bexhill, – All Saints, Sidley (1909, completed 1927–29 with Atwell); Brighton and Hove, – St Augustine (1896–1913); Eastbourne, – St Michael (1901–11); Ewhurst, – mission church at ‘Staplehurst’ (presumably St Mark, Staplecross) (1894); Heathfield, – St Richard (1912–15); Stonegate (1904). Despite his close ecclesiastical links his work was not limited to churches, but included houses in the then fashionable Queen Anne style and schools.

== Marriage ==
Granville married Lucy Anne Evelyn Deane in January 1911 at the Strand, London. Three months later he was living at 74 Upper Gloucester Place, St Marylebone, London. In the census he was given as joint head of the household with a Barrister at law. They had a living in housekeeper and domestic servant. His newly married wife however is given as a visitor and her occupation as Factory Inspector (retired).

In 1911 Lucy became Chief Woman Organiser of women outdoor staff of the National Health Insurance Commission. She was also a member of the Departmental Committee on the Linen Trade in Ireland. In 1912 Mrs. Streatfeild became a member of the Royal Commission on the Civil Service.

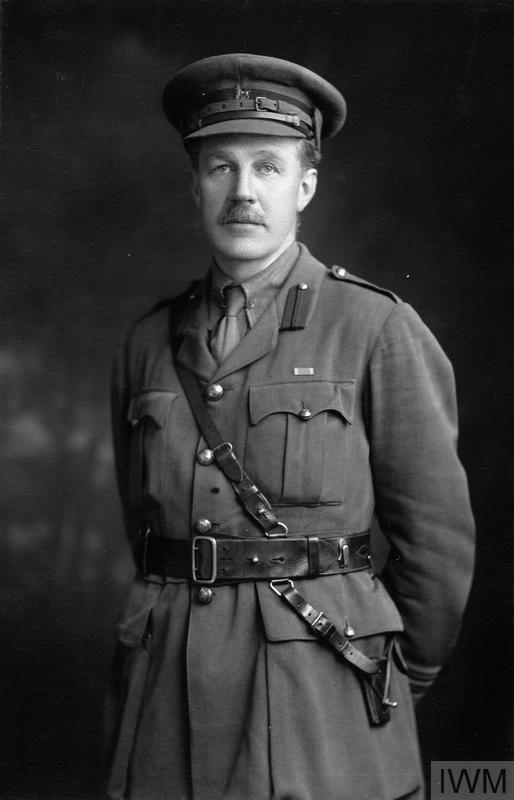
Major Granville E S Streatfeild in his military uniform. He was awarded DSO in the First World War.

During the 1914-18 war Lucy Streatfeild served on the Commission of Enquiry into the Women's Auxiliary Army Corps, and she was also involved in the Kent Committee of Women's Land Army. She was appointed CBE in 1918 New Year’s honours for her work as a Member of Soldiers Dependants Assessment Appeals Committee. In 1920 she became one of the country’s first female Justices of the Peace, serving on the Sevenoaks bench.

== Military Service in World War I ==
During the first world war the services of both husband and wife received official recognition; In 1918 Mrs Streatfeild became a CBE, whilst Major Streatfeild was awarded the DSO and the OBE and was mentioned in dispatches. Granville’s first work in the war was with the Society of Friends in France. Later he was offered a captain’s commission in the Royal Engineers and served in Flanders until the end of the war, when he was staff major, R.E. to the Third Army.

== Post War Heritage ==
Resuming his profession after the war, Granville was responsible for buildings, up and down the country, including churches at Eastbourne, the memorial chapel at Oakham School and, nearer home, a great variety of work, including large and small private houses. Charts Edge, Hoseyrigge, De la Borde and Glebe House range with cottages were among his work in the Westerham district. He also worked on Edenbridge Women’s Institute Hall and the Westerham British Legion Club.

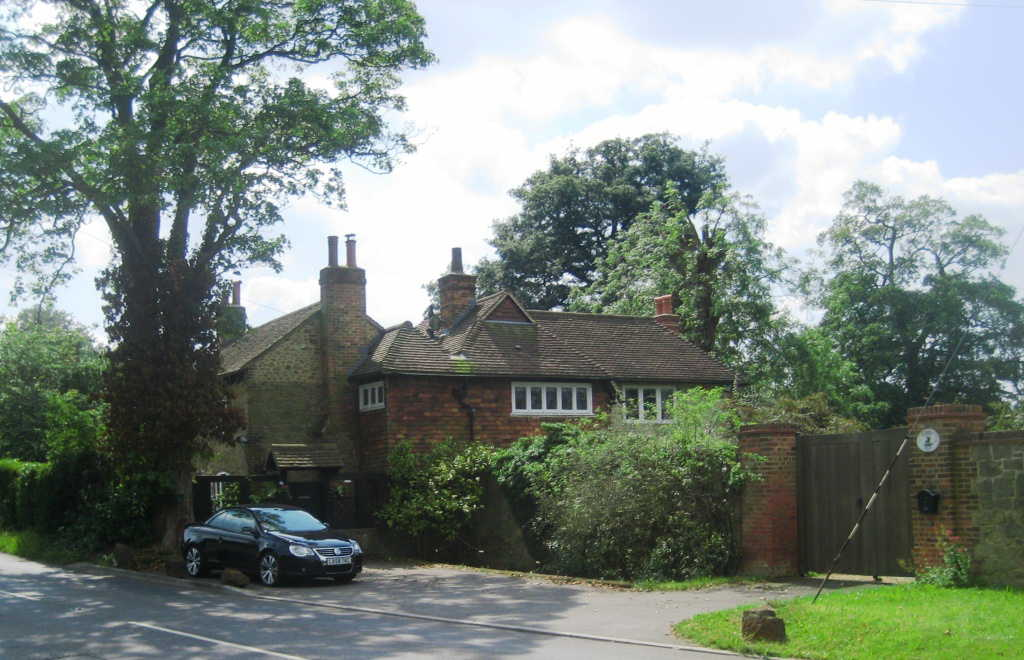
The Cottage on the Hill, Westerham, Kent where Granville and Lucy Streatfeild lived after WWI and from which he worked

Granville and Lucy were living at Cottage on the Hill, Westerham by the mid-1930s and in the 1939 register his occupation is Architect F.R.I.B.A. A note against him say Major RE retired, ARP warden. Lucy’s occupation is Hon Senior Factory Inspector (retired), appointed member various Trade Boards, and served on the Kent County Council. A note against her says Local magistrate and Woman’s Land Army etc.

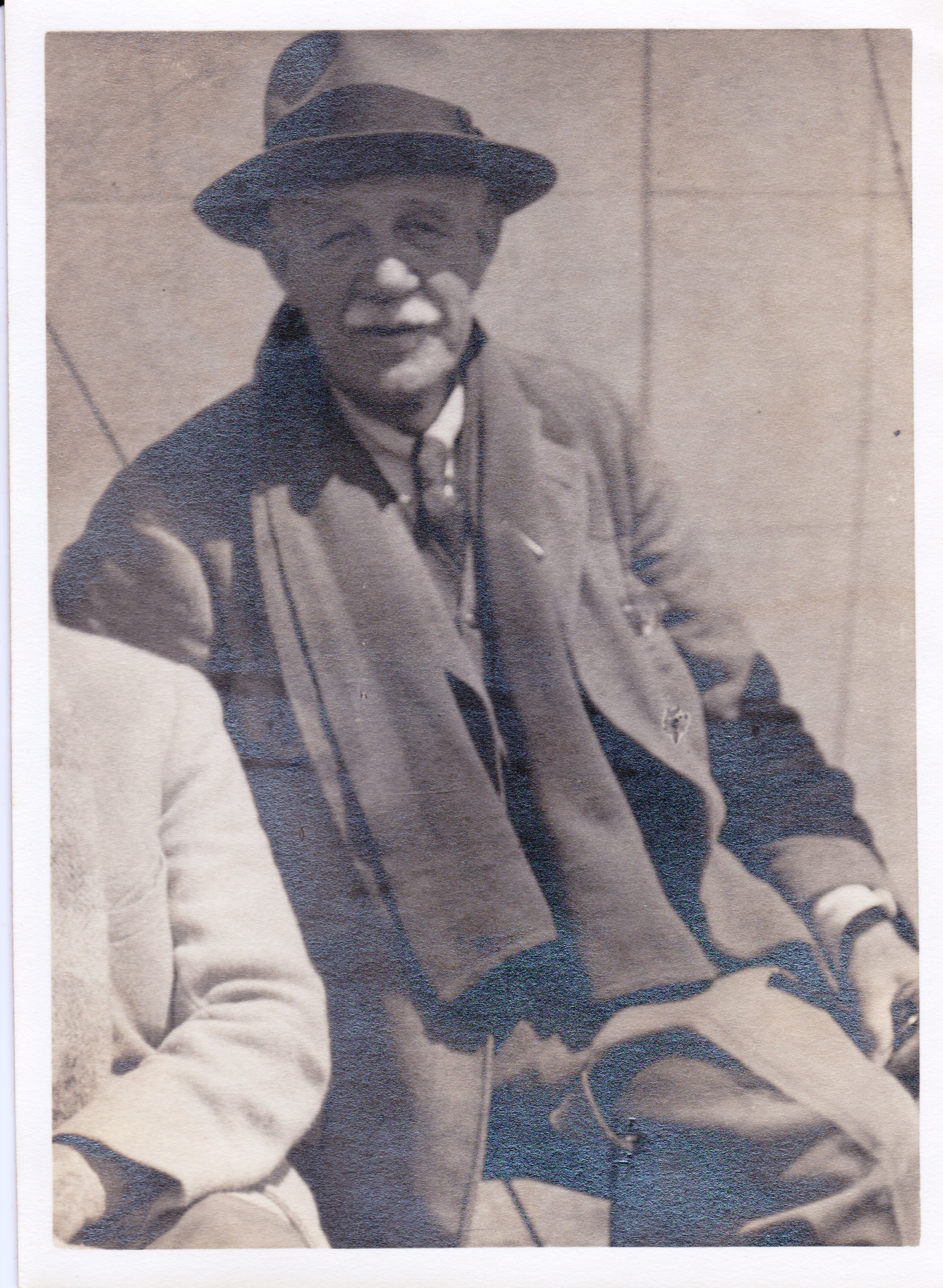
Granville E S Streatfeild

Granville died suddenly on 18th September 1947 at his home “Cottage on the Hill”, Hosey, Westerham and was buried in the family plot at St Mary’s, Westerham on 22nd September. Lucy died on 3rd July 1950 in Westerham and was also buried there.
