= Spodden Valley asbestos controversy =

2004 asbestos controversy in Spodden Valley, Rochdale, England

Coordinates: 53.6136°N 2.1610°W

Rochdale shown within Greater Manchester

The Spodden Valley asbestos controversy arose in May 2004 when approximately 72 acres (290,000 m^{2}) of land in Spodden Valley in Rochdale, England, formerly used by Turner Brothers Asbestos Company (later known as Turner & Newall), and the site of the world's largest asbestos textile factory, was sold to MMC Estates, a property developer. The developer subsequently submitted a planning application to Rochdale Metropolitan Borough Council in December 2004 to build an "urban village" consisting of 650 homes, a children's daycare centre and a business park on the site. The planning application summary claimed: "of particular note is the absence of any asbestos contamination". However, asbestos-containing materials were abundantly visible on the ground, and local residents claimed that there were numerous asbestos dumping sites across the area, and that the woodland there had been heavily contaminated with asbestos dust. Site clearance work had begun as early as May 2004, prior to the submission of the application, including tree felling and soil disturbance, and some waste had been removed on flatbed trailers and open trucks. In September 2005 MMC admitted that the woods were significantly contaminated with asbestos.

A campaign group, Save Spodden Valley, was formed to oppose the development, claiming disturbance of the site in a contaminated state posed too great a risk to public health. Greater Manchester Association of Trade Unions Councils said: "The planners must do their public duty and deem the site permanently unsafe for urban development and formulate a plan to seal all possible sources of asbestos dust as an urgent priority."

The initial planning application was placed on hold in 2005, and Richard Butler, Principal Planning Officer for Rochdale Borough Council said in October 2008: "The application has not yet been determined and is suspended whilst the applicants and their consultants, together with our own contamination experts, assess a number of issues, the most important being the asbestos risk and the remediation required as part of the redevelopment." In December 2009, despite no decontamination work having been carried out, the council earmarked the site for 568 houses, based on a housing density of 30 dwellings per hectare, in a draft allocation of future brownfield land targets. In January 2010, however, the council deleted references to the redevelopment of the site. Rochdale parliamentary candidate Simon Danczuk warned that the council believe a housing development on the site is an inevitability and iterated that they are "sleepwalking into a catastrophic mistake." MMC have stated that "there is no viable alternative to development led remediation of the site." A National Health and Safety Commissioner who was formerly a Health and Safety Manager at the factory has said that the felling of trees and disturbing of soil on the site is "sheer madness... With the potential amount of asbestos on that site, no development should be built on this land." Hilda Palmer of the Greater Manchester Hazards Centre has said: "Asbestos is a carcinogen and it causes lung diseases. When asbestos gets into the air and can be inhaled by people it can cause those diseases 10, 20, 50 years down the line. So if there is any development on that site there is a potential for serious lung diseases, cancers and death from that development." Spokesman Jason Addy of Save Spodden Valley, stated: "The key issue is contamination. Asbestos from this site has killed far too many people already."

The planning application was finally officially rejected by Rochdale Council in January 2011. MMC Estates put the land back up for sale in August 2011. As of December 2018, the land was owned by Renshaw Properties, a company registered in the British Virgin Islands.

== Background ==
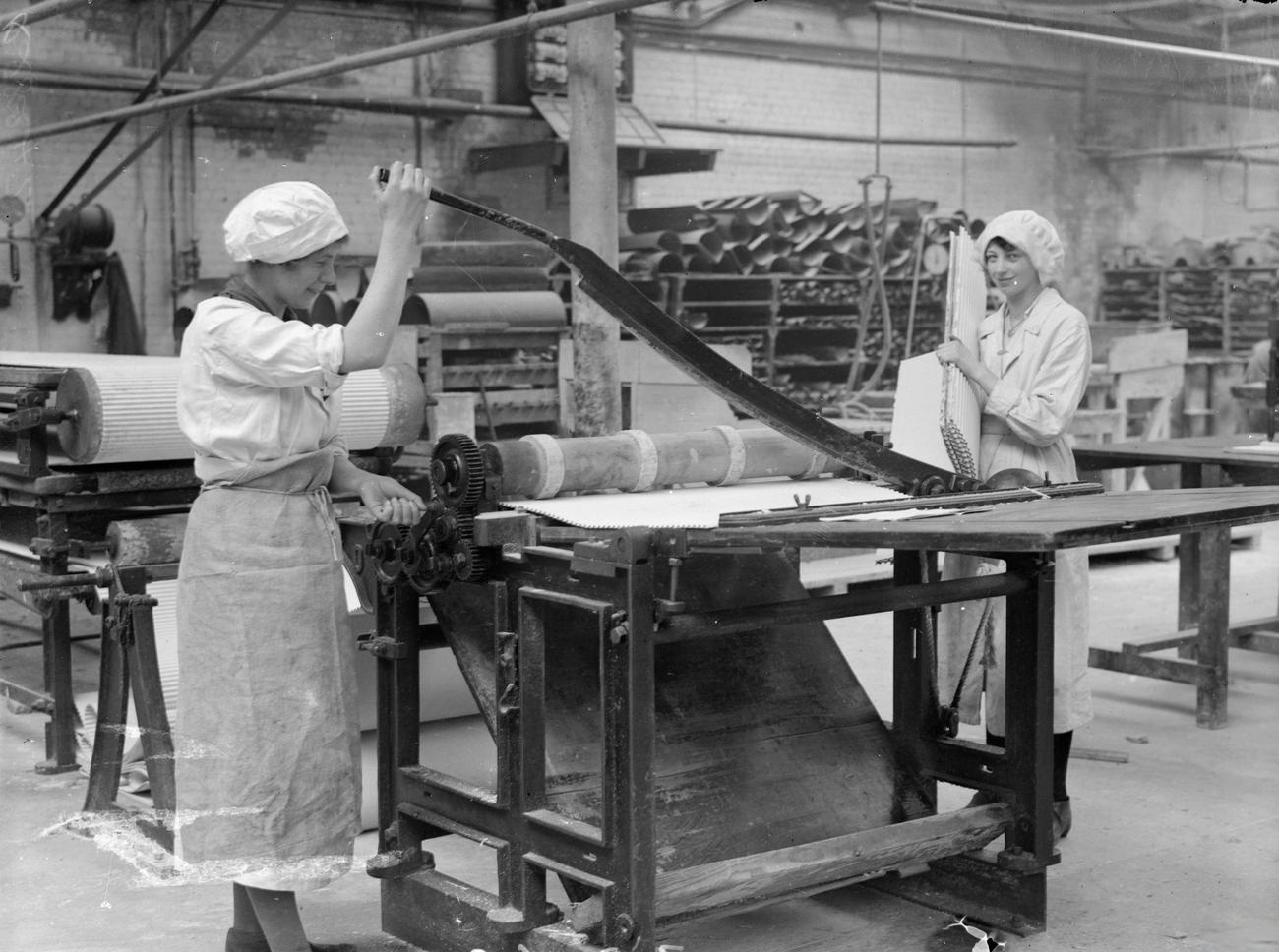
Workers cutting sheets of asbestos in a Lancashire factory, September 1918

The manufacture of asbestos products began on the site in 1879, and by 1970 the factory had an annual output of 2,250,000 yards of asbestos cloth and 5,500,000 miles (8,900,000 km) of asbestos yarn. The dangerous nature of asbestos fibres had first been suspected in 1898, when Factory Inspector Lucy Deane reported: "The evil effects of asbestos dust have also instigated a microscopic examination of the mineral dust by HM Medical Inspector [Thomas Legge]. Clearly revealed was the sharp glass-like jagged nature of the particles, and where they are allowed to rise and to remain suspended in the air of the room in any quantity, the effects have been found to be injurious as might have been expected." In 1924 a 33-year-old Turner's employee, Nellie Kershaw, became the first officially recognised victim of asbestosis but the firm refused to accept responsibility for her death, saying it would "create a precedent". Her family received no compensation, and she was buried in a pauper's grave in Rochdale.

In 1937, Turner's director Robert H. Turner wrote: "All asbestos fibre dust is a danger to lungs. If we can produce evidence from this country that the industry is not responsible for any asbestosis claims, we may be able to avoid tiresome regulations and the introduction of dangerous occupational talk." Despite an awareness of the potentially lethal effects of asbestos, the factory site remained heavily contaminated: measurements taken in 1950 and again in 1957 showed levels of asbestos dust in the air outside the factory roof were between 18 and 60 particles per cubic centimetre - far above the company's own safe working level of 2 to 3 particles, while a measurement taken near houses outside the factory premises was 47 particles. In August 1957, Turner's revealed that they were dumping 15,000 lb (6.8 tonnes) of asbestos dust recovered from ventilation filters alone each week. The same document reported that the levels of asbestos dust on the factory's roof exceeded those in the actual production areas inside the factory. In the 1950s people living near the factory joked that the area had frost all year round and the local woods were nicknamed "the snow trees" due to the permanent dusting with asbestos particles.

In 1964 a letter to Turner's directors from solicitors James Chapman & Co admitted: "We have over the years been able to talk our way out of claims or compromise for comparatively small amounts, but we have always recognised that at some stage solicitors of experience would, with the advance in medical knowledge and the development of the law, recognise there is no real defence to these claims and take us to trial." By the mid-1970s however the number of asbestos-related deaths began to increase steadily and from 1980 onwards the asbestos market began to decline dramatically. In 1982 the company posted losses of £30million, including compensation payouts of £6million. In 1998, with 263,000 claims for industrial injury pending, Turner's was bought by Federal-Mogul. In 2001, Federal-Mogul filed for Chapter 11 bankruptcy protection as a result of asbestos-related claims amounting to $351million. In the United Kingdom the business went into administration in October 2001 leaving a pension fund deficit estimated at £400 million. UK victims of the company's asbestos pollution were offered only a fraction of the compensation to which they were entitled. The weaving and asbestos producing areas of the Spodden Valley site were subsequently demolished in 2001.

== Land purchase ==
MMC Estates and Rathbone Jersey Limited purchased the site in May 2004, and said: "Any successful regeneration must find alternative uses and following discussions with the council, the site was defined as an 'area of opportunity' for a mixed use 'urban village' type development, comprising primarily employment and residential development supported by an appropriate level of ancillary uses. This will be supported by an environmental impact statement. MMC is a local developer responsible for the sympathetic council-backed regeneration of other sites within the borough, and has commenced some clearance works involving the felling of trees which are not protected by tree preservation orders." A Rochdale Council Draft Unitary Development Plan published earlier in the year had accepted that "the whole site is contaminated as a result of the industrial processes carried out there" and Administrators of Turner's considered the site "an asset of dubious value, (possibly even a liability)." The Administrators also stated that if mesothelioma or asbestos-related cancer deaths arose from any future development on the site, the liability for this would rest with the new owners and developers of the land.

=== Tree felling ===
Between May 13–14, 2004 the site was enclosed with temporary mesh fencing and plain-clothed security guards commenced patrols of the public areas. At 02:00 on May 15 bulldozers arrived at the site and tree-felling began at 07:00. The work caused immediate concern to nearby residents who feared the work might unsettle asbestos deposits in the ground. Residents formed the Save Spodden Valley action group the following week. Residents also protested to Rochdale Council, which subsequently issued an emergency tree preservation order on six parts of the site, preventing the removal of trees without permission of planning officers, and carrying a fine of up to £20,000 per tree. The Health and Safety Executive (HSE) also secured a voluntary arrangement to halt any work that could disturb soil on the site pending soil sampling. Former Turner's employees and local residents claimed that, as recently as the 1960s, asbestos dust and fibres were clearly visible hanging from the trees, and that a disused coalmine shaft exposed by the tree felling had been used over a period of decades to dump hundreds of tonnes of asbestos waste.

=== "Rochdale's Chernobyl" ===
In November 2004 Rochdale councillor Tom Stott, a former employee at Turner's, warned that any development of the site could be an environmental disaster, and that there could be so much asbestos waste in the ground that serious disturbance could lead to "Rochdale's Chernobyl." He also expressed concern that the developers would be allowed by the council to carry out their own contamination survey to determine whether the site was fit for development, which was confirmed by the council: "Any developers would have to provide a full environmental assessment of the site as part of their planning application. The council wouldn't be doing any surveys of its own because it doesn't have the expertise or the resources to do this."

=== Urban village plans ===
In December 2004 plans were submitted, in partnership with Countryside Properties, to build an 'urban village' over two-thirds of the site, comprising residential and business developments, a retail site and doctor's surgery. MMC director Mark Russell stated that the plans were in 'everyone's interests' and would be carried out without harming the environment or causing problems with old asbestos: "At the end of the day this is a contaminated site with lots of old, ugly, dilapidated buildings on and it needs something doing with it. It is in everyone's interests that this happens." The planning application summary claimed: "of particular note is the absence of any asbestos contamination". A report submitted by the developers said only one out of the 86 soil tests they carried out showed any traces of asbestos dust, and that traces of lead and copper were more prevalent on the site. A working party of six councillors expressed concern that many areas on the 72-acre (290,000 m^{2}) site might have been unchecked, however, and Councillor Elwyn Watkins said that he had personally observed asbestos-containing materials hanging on trees when he joined campaigners on the north side of the site. Heavy winds in January 2005 felled several trees, revealing asbestos-like fibres on the exposed roots. Residents eventually had the waste tested themselves at an independent laboratory where it was confirmed to be Amosite ("brown asbestos"), the most hazardous of the asbestos minerals because of its long persistence in the lungs of exposed people.

== Sampling controversy ==
In April 2005, following the confirmation of asbestos fibres found on tree roots, the council asked developers to provide more detailed information relating to their contaminated land surveys, and placed the application on hold. They also announced that they were considering appointing their own environmental consultants to examine the site. Jason Addy said: "This is what we have been asking for since day one. The information handed in with the planning application was inaccurate, misleading and avoided many issues. As this site begins to reveal more of its murky secrets people are realising just how contaminated it is. We are very concerned about the asbestos contamination on the site. We are very worried about the way this is going, if it wasn't so serious it would be a farce." Rochdale councillor William Hobhouse said: "With no government regulations specifying safe levels of asbestos in soil, it is clear the council, working with outside consultants, will have to formulate what percentage of asbestos in the soil is safe."

=== Land audit ===
In May 2005 the Save Spodden Valley group claimed that it had uncovered internal MMC correspondence which identified numerous sites where asbestos fibres had been found in September 2004, predating the planning application. The document stated: "The audit undertaken was visual and no samples have been sent away for analysis. I enclose a site map where the asbestos has been located: Top section of road near hair pin bend, asbestos sheets and asbestos fibre found in tree stumps. Road leading to Healey Dell, asbestos cloth." The developers responded that they had been aware of contamination in the northern portion of the site, but their testing report submitted to the council did not include this area as there had been no intention to develop there. Instead they had confined their testing only to those areas where they intended to develop and that there had been "some misunderstanding of our intentions and the test result."

=== Health and Safety Executive tests ===
HSE tests on building rubble carried out on the site in March 2005 were revealed in July 2005, and demonstrated the presence of significant contamination. Paul Rowen MP, the Liberal Democrat Member of Parliament for Rochdale, raised the issue and the results in a House of Commons debate on 28 June 2005. He said: "At the request of residents, the Health and Safety Commission recently tested rubble from parts of the factory buildings on the site. Of the eight samples tested, three confirmed the existence of asbestos of up to 1%, which is 10 times higher than the proportion ensuring that waste is classed as special waste. Yet in his planning submission, the developer stated: "Of particular note is the absence of any asbestos contamination"; and in a meeting with local councillors earlier this year, he and his expert witness said that the tests on the rubble had all been negative. For the past 10 months, open wagons have been transporting that rubble around the borough to unknown places, and subject to no control... This case involves a development costing up to £100 million for which the developer has so far paid Rochdale Council a £5,500 planning application fee. For that, the council is expected to carry out all the checks and controls to ensure that the developer is acting honourably."

=== Encia Environmental report ===
In August 2005 a second report commissioned by the developers, from Encia Environmental, revealed levels of asbestos fibres in two soil samples from the site at 1.3% and 2.3%, 13 and 23 times above the limit at which waste is deemed "hazardous". A level of 3% is categorised as "toxic". Regarding the developers earlier assertions that they had not intended to develop the controversial northern section, council planning officer Ken Smith claimed that the developers had been told they would have to submit a planning application for the whole of the 72-acre (290,000 m^{2}) site, which would have to show any asbestos tests and plans for removal, and not just selected portions. "They were clearly told remediation work must take place on the whole of the site," he said. "It's been quite clear it was 72 acres and not [just] part of that site."

=== Significant contamination ===
MMC Estates and Countryside Properties subsequently released statements in September 2005 acknowledging that there was significant contamination on the site. Michael Drogan, director of MMC, said: "Following the completion of investigations, which have now been published, we recognise there is significant asbestos contamination in areas of the woodland and have evidence of pockets of contamination in other parts of the site." Rochdale councillor Tom Stott responded: "In their initial reports they said there was little contamination. Now it is 'significant'. I am shocked that it has taken so long for the companies to admit what we have known for over 12 months."

=== Advertising Standards Authority non-broadcast adjudication ===
A brochure produced by MMC and Countryside Properties, entitled Regeneration of Spodden Valley Community News Autumn 2005, and distributed to 50,000 households in the area, was determined by the Advertising Standards Authority (ASA) to have breached a code of honesty and truthfulness, and was misleading when it claimed:

- piles of crushed rubble at the site were "free" of asbestos
- a level of 0.01% asbestos was "safe"

The ASA advised MMC to "take greater care when producing marketing communications in future", and "to ensure that they held full substantation before making similar claims."

=== Atkins Global report ===
The report commissioned from Atkins Global by Rochdale council, at a cost of £80,000, was published in July 2006 and claimed that previous tests on the land, carried out on behalf of the developers, were not thorough enough, and that extensive work would be required before councillors should even consider the controversial planning application. Atkins Global also claimed that the majority of the developers' tests did not detect the true levels of asbestos in the soil. The report concluded that "the presence of asbestos cannot be ruled out across much of the site." In June 2007, Countryside Properties withdrew from the joint planning application. MMC released a statement saying: "Countryside Properties Ltd has withdrawn from the planning application for a mixed use scheme on the former Turner Brothers site because they became disillusioned with the apparent unwillingness of the town planning department to deal with the application as a result of the ill-founded and negative publicity generated by Jason Addy's campaign. The people of Rochdale should keep in mind that the site owners have not caused the contamination problems on the site. This was inherited from Federal Mogul... If we were to cave in to Jason Addy's uninformed scaremongering and let him have his way, which we most certainly won't, the site would remain a contaminated eyesore on the face of Rochdale in eternity, and all the surrounding houses and properties will be devalued by his badly thought out obsession."

As of 2010, the site remains undeveloped and no significant remediation or decontamination work has been undertaken.

== Implications of the Corby Ruling ==
The ruling in the Corby toxic waste case, delivered in July 2009, found Corby Borough Council liable in negligence, public nuisance and a breach of statutory duty for its reclamation of a steel works and the resulting atmospheric contamination. The case against the council cited: "The Defendant's urban land reclamation programme and the presence of poisonous waste presented a significant risk to health. The poisonous waste was ultra hazardous and various sites contained substantial quantities of contaminated waste and toxic materials that were likely to cause personal injuries to persons in the surrounding area in the event of their escape." While recognising that there was insufficient epidemiological data to establish whether the victims' injuries arose from a "common cause", or from airborne contamination or from the reclamation works, the judge ruled that there was a "statistically significant cluster" of birth defects in Corby which needed "explanation other than chance": it was not the court's purpose to establish whether the victims were individually exposed to contaminants from the reclamation, rather to determine whether any relevant breach of duty had the ability to cause injuries of the type complained of. The judge also ruled that it was "reasonably foreseeable that the local population might be exposed to hazardous or contaminated substances" as a result of the council's clean-up programme.

Matt Townsend, head of the environmental practice at Allen & Overy, says: "One of the important lessons from the case is that because of the rapidly evolving nature of environmental science and advancing knowledge and techniques, it will no longer be possible for developers to hide behind the science. To claim that you didn’t know is now unacceptable.". Stephen Matthew, a partner in the project group at corporate law firm Nabarro, advises: "Councils and regeneration bodies still need to be very open and clear about how they intend to deal with material on brownfield sites. Councils need to take professional advice... Don't leave a gaping hole for any future class actions."

Following the Corby ruling, Jason Addy stated: "The Corby ruling could have huge implications for the actions and responsibilities of Rochdale Council for the Spodden Valley site. Environmental pollution has been a problem at the Rochdale factory with acknowledged cases of asbestos-related cancer caused by environmental exposure." Laurie Kazan Allen, Editor of the British Asbestos Newsletter, said: "This landmark decision has ramifications for Rochdale Council regarding the Spodden Valley asbestos factory site. There is now a clear legal principle that local authorities hold a duty of care to protect communities from the hazardous effects of disturbing contaminated land. Since at least the 1960s there has been clear evidence that the inhalation of asbestos fibres, even in low quantities, can cause terminal cancer decades after initial exposure. Rochdale Council must take heed of this historic decision and act to protect local people."

Hilda Palmer of the Greater Manchester Hazards Centre said: "This has serious implications for Rochdale MBC in its management and control of the ex T&N site. The site is known to be extensively contaminated with the known carcinogen asbestos, which may be released into the air whenever the site is disturbed, and the invisible microscopic fibres spread in the air across the area to be inhaled by people, including children who are especially at risk of developing asbestos related terminal cancers such as mesothelioma years later. These facts are not in dispute and though the owner of the site is the responsible duty holder, the court judgment on Corby Council confirms the duty of care of a council as the planning authority and environmental health authority in terms of managing and controlling the risks to long term health presented by the airborne asbestos fibres from this site."

== See also ==
- Armley asbestos disaster
- Corby toxic waste case
- Agriculture Street Landfill
- Nellie Kershaw
