= Toxic Town =

British television series

- Genre: Drama
- Written by: Jack Thorne; Amy Trigg
- Directed by: Minkie Spiro
- Starring: Jodie Whittaker; Aimee Lou Wood; Robert Carlyle; Rory Kinnear; Brendan Coyle; Claudia Jessie; Joe Dempsie; Michael Socha
- Country of origin: United Kingdom
- Original language: English
- No. of episodes: 4

Production
- Executive producers: Annabel Jones; Jack Thorne; Minkie Spiro
- Producer: Delyth Scudamore
- Running time: 47–65 minutes
- Production companies: Broke & Bones; One Shoe Films

Original release
- Network: Netflix
- Release: 27 February 2025

Toxic Town is a British drama miniseries, written by Jack Thorne. It follows the story of three mothers involved in the Corby toxic waste case.

The four-part series was released worldwide on Netflix on 27 February 2025.

== Synopsis ==
In 1979, the English steel manufacturing town Corby went through massive turmoil when British Steel announced the closure of the steel plant. In 1995, the Corby Council in an effort to revitalise the town started a project to reclaim the land previously occupied by the steel plant and develop it into a new commercial and tourist hub. In digging up the grounds of the former steel plant, contaminated soil was moved and dumped at a separate site, contaminating surrounding residential areas as normal safety and environmental protocols were ignored by the contractors.

Susan and Tracey are Corby residents pregnant during the Wonderworld Theme Park development project. Both women were admitted to the hospital, initially for observations for typical pregnancy related concerns. Ted Jenkins is young government employee auditing the development project. When he discovered protocols weren't being adhered to, he quickly realised pressure from his seniors to turn a blind eye.

Susan and Tracey's newborns have congenital birth defects, with Tracey's daughter Shelby having serious congenital heart and lungs deformities. The series later revealed Pattie Walker and Maggie Mahon also gave birth to babies with birth defects.

An anonymous leak by Ted Jenkins showed hundreds of pounds of government contracts went to the improper bidder, indicating criminal misappropriation of public funds. Years later, a journalist contacts the women of Corby who experienced babies with birth abnormalities around the same time, citing potential toxic contamination as the cause. In the meantime, parts of the Corby council tries to cover up evidence of corruption regarding the reclamation project. Susan McIntyre starts gathering affected mothers to form a legal case.

A fire burned down Bill Martin's office, destroying important paperwork and evidence of impropriety. The police investigation of the fire took more than a year with no progress, while Roy Thomas of the Corby Council continues to allow the contractors responsible to continue development. In 2002, Corby Council denies there were any epidemiological difference between the rates of birth defect in Corby during the window of interests and surrounding areas, and continues to deny wrongdoing. Later, Susan's legal representation were able to prove the RHA report was conducted incorrectly, meaning there is a birth defect cluster in Corby. Susan then goes on TV to report the progress of the investigation.

Sam Hagen, the only council-member on the Corby council accused of corruption and wrongdoing, is forced off of the council by Roy Thomas. In turn, he submits documents to Des Collins, head of Susan's legal team, indicating the Corby council were wilfully negligent. After establishing the legal case and presenting it to Corby council leadership, the council rejected the settlement offer. The case goes to trial. In 2010, after a long trial and several witnesses including Ted Jenkins' testimony, the claimant won the settlement.

== Cast ==
- Jodie Whittaker as Susan McIntyre
- Aimee Lou Wood as Tracey Taylor
- Robert Carlyle as Sam Hagen
- Rory Kinnear as Des Collins
- Brendan Coyle as Roy Thomas
- Claudia Jessie as Maggie Mahon
- Joe Dempsie as Derek Mahon
- Michael Socha as Peter (husband of Susan McIntyre)
- Stephen McMillan as Ted Jenkins
- Karla Crome as Pattie Walker
- Lauren Lyle as Dani Holliday
- Ben Batt as Pat Miller
- Finley Hanson as Daniel McIntyre
- Matthew Durkan as Mark Taylor
- Simon Harrison as Bill Martin
- Jaz Singh Deol as Chief Executive
- Kobi Sadler as Conner McIntyre

== Episodes ==
No.	Title	Directed by	Written by	Original release date
1	"Episode 1"	Minkie Spiro	Jack Thorne	27 February 2025
2	"Episode 2"	Minkie Spiro	Jack Thorne	27 February 2025
3	"Episode 3"	Minkie Spiro	Jack Thorne and Amy Trigg	27 February 2025
4	"Episode 4"	Minkie Spiro	Jack Thorne	27 February 2025

== Production ==
In August 2023, it was announced that Netflix had commissioned a four-part series written by Jack Thorne and based on the 2009 Corby poisonings and the subsequent environmental court case, dubbed in some quarters as "the British Erin Brockovich". Thorne said that Toxic Town would focus on "these funny, brave, incredible women and the way they scrapped for their children". The series is produced by Charlie Brooker and Annabel Jones' production company Broke & Bones with Minkie Spiro as director and Amy Trigg as co-writer of the third episode.

=== Casting ===
In August 2023, Jodie Whittaker, Aimee Lou Wood, Robert Carlyle, Rory Kinnear, Toby Eden, and Brendan Coyle were confirmed in the cast. Claudia Jessie, Joe Dempsie, and Michael Socha joined the cast in September. In December 2023, Lauren Lyle joined the cast. There are also roles for Stephen McMillan, Karla Crome, and Ben Batt.

=== Filming ===
The production began under an Equity union contract so fell outside the 2023 actors' strike. Principal photography on the project started in September 2023. Filming took place in Breightmet, in Bolton that month. Filming also took place in Stockport, Runcorn (The Heath Business and Technical Park), Holmfirth, Liverpool, and Sale.

== Release ==
The series premiered on Netflix on 27 February 2025.

== Reception ==
On the review aggregator website Rotten Tomatoes, 100% of 18 critics' reviews are positive, with an average rating of 7.7/10. The website's consensus reads: "Expertly paced and given a rich emotional core by its outstanding ensemble, Toxic Town dramatizes an inspiring true story with compelling conviction." Metacritic, which uses a weighted average, assigned a score of 84 out of 100 based on 7 critics, indicating "universal acclaim".

== Awards and nominations ==
Year	Award	Category	Nominee	Result	Ref.
2026	BAFTA TV Awards	British Academy Television Award for Best Actress	Jodie Whittaker	Nominated	
