= Annie Jane Duncan =

Australian factory inspector (1858–1943)

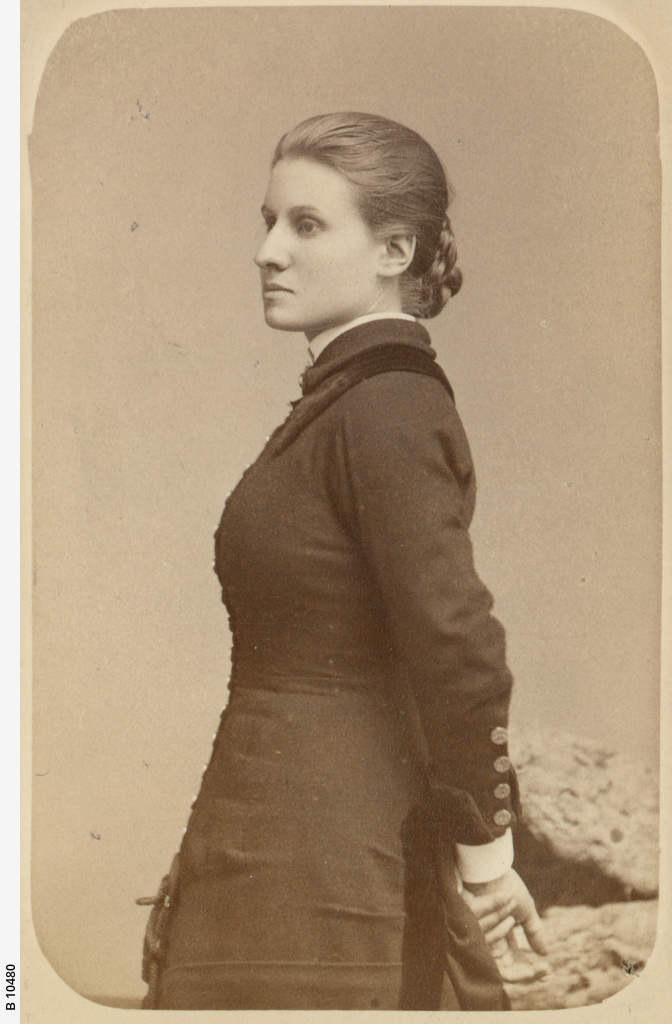
- Duncan, c. 1883
- Born: 25 September 1858; Port Adelaide
- Died: 13 September 1943 (aged 84); College Park
- Education: Sanitary Institute
- Occupation: factory inspector
- Parent(s): Anne (born Williams) and Dr Handasyde Duncan

Annie Jane Duncan (1858 – 1943) was an Australian factory inspector. She trained and worked in England and then brought her qualifications back to Australia. She was the first women appointed to the role in New South Wales and saw herself as a precursor to other women who would follow.

== Life ==
Duncan was born in 1858 in Port Adelaide. Her parents were Anne (born Williams) and Dr Handasyde Duncan. Her mother died in childbirth when she was three. She had a stepmother, Emily Susan Servante, but she too died. When she was sixteen she began to care for her father during the last few years of his life. She was about twenty when she was given an annuity after her father died.

For six years she lived in Dashwood Gully with her aunt, where she lived a carefree life of middle-class pastimes and new dresses. At the end of 1884 her sister, Mary, married Arthur Hammerton Champion who was the assistant master at St. Peter's Adelaide. He became the new headmaster of the Launceston Church Grammar School in Tasmania in 1885.

In 1893 she was in London where she knew that she had to find paid work. Perchance she met Lucy Deane Streatfeild who in 1894 was working for the Home Office as a workshop inspector (factory inspector). Duncan completed her training in April 1894 when she was one of several women, within the sixty, who passed the examination to qualify as an Inspector of Nuisances by the Sanitary Institute. She worked as a factory inspector where she met some leading figures including Beatrice Webb. However that job came to an end and she returned to her European travels.

In 1896 the Factories and Shops Act came into force, and in 1897 she was back in Australia where her qualifications saw her employed by the New South Wales Department of Public Instruction to deal with the 1896 act. She was the first female inspector to be appointed in New South Wales. Her employment was secure and she called on the NSW branch of the National Council of Women of Australia for support. In 1912 she became a senior factory inspector. She was closing down operations where she found that they were unsafe or unhealthy, but she was unhappy with the politics of the Labor Party. She knew that she was breaking glass ceilings but she resigned in 1918.

Duncan died in the Adelaide suburb of College Park in 1943.
