= Corby toxic waste case =

Court case linking atmospheric toxic waste and birth defects

Coordinates: 52°29′25″N 0°42′05″W

Corby Group Litigation
- Court: High Court of Justice of England and Wales, Queen's Bench Division (Technology and Construction Court)
- Full case name: The Claimants appearing on the Register of the Corby Group Litigation v Corby District Council
- Decided: 29 July 2009
- Citation: [2009] EWHC 1944 (TCC)
- Transcript: Full text of Approved Judgment

Court membership
- Judge sitting: The Hon. Mr. Justice Akenhead

Keywords
- public liability; negligence; public nuisance; breach of statutory duty

The Corby toxic waste case was a court case decided by The Hon. Mr. Justice Akenhead at the High Court of Justice, London, on 29 July 2009 in the case of Corby Group Litigation v. Corby Borough Council [2009] EWHC 1944 (TCC). The judge found Corby Borough Council liable in negligence, public nuisance and a breach of statutory duty for its reclamation of a Corby Steelworks in the town of Corby, Northamptonshire, between 1985 and 1997.

The landmark decision was historically significant as the first in the world to establish a link between atmospheric toxic waste and birth defects – all previous cases have involved water pollution – and held implications for other council reclamation programmes and the methods of conducting reclamation in England and Wales.

The case has been described as "the British Erin Brockovich".

== Background ==
Corby became a steelmaking centre through the establishment of the Stewarts & Lloyds production site in the 1930s, and by 1960 had grown to become one of the most heavily industrialised areas in the Midlands. In 1981 the plant had become unprofitable and owners British Steel Corporation closed the site. By then it was one of the largest steelmaking operations in Western Europe, covering 680 acres (280 ha), with four blast furnaces, two coke oven complexes and associated facilities. During its operation a huge quantity of industrial waste, including toxic waste, had been deposited there.

Between 1984 and 1999, Corby Borough Council undertook the demolition, excavation and redevelopment of the site as part of a programme of urban regeneration. This involved transporting the waste through populated areas to a quarry north of the site, utilising up to 200 vehicle movements daily. The toxic waste was carried in open lorries, spilling sludge over the roads and releasing huge amounts of dust into the air.

Subsequently, in the late 1980s and 1990s, the rates of upper-limb differences in babies born in Corby were found to be almost three times higher than those of children born in the surrounding area and ten times higher than a town with a population of 60,000 should expect. In all cases initially referred to the court there were no previous family histories of limb defect.

== Action against Corby Borough Council ==
In November 2005, expert evidence was submitted to the High Court in London by the mothers of 30 children who claimed that during their pregnancies they were exposed to contamination from the waste removal operations and who sought to bring a legal action to try to prove a link between the mismanagement of the toxic waste and the birth defects suffered by their children. The evidence presented included reports detailing the higher rate of birth defects, and alleging that exposure to the toxic waste was the likely cause of the children's deformities. They also presented a report written by Roger Braithwaite, an environmental expert instructed by the families, which concluded that the negligent handling of the waste by Corby Borough Council demonstrated "naivety, arrogance, ignorance, incompetence and a possible serious conflict of interest... At this early stage it would seem to me that these... badly polluted lands have never been effectively or comprehensively assessed, properly permitted, regulated, monitored or adequate records maintained... This is environmental negligence on a grand scale."

After reviewing the evidence presented by all parties to the case, an order approved by the then Lord Chief Justice, Lord Phillips of Worth Matravers, set out the terms of the litigation in relation to the council's management and execution of the "land reclamation contracts" between 1985 and 1999 and any duty they had to the families, and permission was given for the parents to pursue the claim against Corby Borough Council as a group litigation involving children born between 1985 and 1999.

== Claimants ==
The case to be heard at the High Court in 2009 represented 18 young people who alleged that toxic waste dumped by Corby Borough Council between 1984 and 1999 was the cause of their deformities. All had serious disabilities, including missing or underdeveloped fingers and deformities of their feet. They alleged that their mothers ingested or inhaled the toxic substances that affected the development of their limbs while they were still in the womb. All of their mothers either lived in or regularly visited Corby between 1984 and 1999 when the work was carried out across the town.

The case had taken ten years to reach this point, largely because of the difficulties encountered in obtaining disclosure of information from Corby Borough Council.

== 2009 hearing ==
When the case reached the High Court on 16 February 2009, involving 18 families and the culmination of a ten-year legal process, evidence was put forward describing how, between 1985 and 1997, there existed a possibility that expectant mothers could have been affected by toxic waste which could either have travelled by air as a consequence of dust, or could have been ingested after landing on vegetables or other items. The area was constantly coated with a thick, red dust, including an open air market selling vegetables and other produce. The vehicles were uncovered, and there was no adherence to procedures such as the wheel washing of the vehicles. David Wilby, QC, leading counsel for the claimants, stated in court that one expert, in trying to convey the appearance of the minute particles hanging over the town at that time, had described it as an "atmospheric soup of toxic materials".

With regard to the allegations that the council demonstrated a conflict of interest, Wilby stated: "Their motive – to a very considerable degree – was money. They looked to the Government and to the redevelopment organisations for the funds to redevelop the sites. They used that money to pay local contractors and the reality was that many of the contracts were awarded to friends or former work colleagues of members of the council."

The presence and locations of the toxic waste were known before work began, having been stored in purpose-built "pits" around the site by British Steel, "in a form which was of no danger to anyone unless they fell in. But the effect of the works undertaken was to remove the majority of these materials and move them a long distance to other areas of Corby, and this involved vast numbers of vehicle movements."

Professor Louise Parker PhD, Professor of Pediatrics and Community Health and Epidemiology at Dalhousie University, Halifax, Nova Scotia, Canada, testified that between 1989 and 1998 children in Corby were 2.5 times more likely to be born with upper limb defects than in the rest of the Kettering Health Authority area, which was statistically "quite significant".

An internal report prepared by Corby Borough Council was uncovered which had raised the prospect of residents being exposed to high levels of zinc, arsenic, boron and nickel as a result of the reclamation works, and a separate report, from the council's auditor, complained of incompetence and negligence by the council and said there was a "cavalier approach" to the operation. The families' counsel submitted that whether Corby Borough Council knew or should have known that the substances being transported around the town could have been hazardous to health was "hardly rocket science".

Further, Wilby submitted that the council committed a criminal act when they allowed the movement of toxic waste without a licence: in 1986 there was no proper permission in place for moving the contaminated waste, only for moving 'inert' waste. Inspectors were not told the true nature of the substances involved and so took only sporadic samples from the site. Wilby said that the council had deliberately ignored the advice from experts to properly analyse the site because it was going to be an expensive task. He said: "They decided they were going to do this 'dig-and-dump'. They thought 'we have got this great deal of land and all this spoil on this site which must be contaminated, we have got to get it off there because we'll never be able to sell it.'" Records demonstrated that in one test which took place in 1983 only five soil samples were collected to represent a 30-acre (120,000 m^{2}) area.

== Ruling ==
In his ruling, Mr. Justice Akenhead said it was clear that the council had permitted toxic waste to disperse into the atmosphere. He also said that there was a "statistically significant" cluster of birth defects between 1989 and 1999, and that, "toxicologically, there were present on and from the Corby Borough Council sites, over the whole period from 1985 (and possibly before) until 1997, the types of contaminants which could cause the birth defects complained of."

"There was an extended period between 1983 and August 1997 in which Corby Borough Council was extensively negligent in its control and management of the sites which they acquired from British Steel and otherwise used. That negligence and, as from April 1, 1992, breach of statutory duty on the part of CBC permitted and led to the extensive dispersal of contaminated mud and dust over public areas of Corby and into and over private homes, with the result that the contaminants could realistically have caused the types of birth defects of which complaint has been made by the claimants (save in limited respects)... Corby Borough Council is liable in public nuisance, negligence and breach of statutory duty, obviously subject to it being established in later proceedings by individual claimants that their particular conditions were actually caused by the defaults identified in this judgment."

The two youngest claimants, nine-year-old India Harrison and ten-year-old Ashleigh Jane Custance, were unable at that time to proceed with their cases, however, because of the ruling that there were no breaches of duty after August 1997. Their parents indicated that they would appeal this cut-off date.

== Reactions ==
The families' lawyer, Des Collins, said: "Prior to the trial, the council maintained that a thorough investigation had led it to the conclusion that there was no link between the reclamation work and the children's birth defects. It also maintained that had any convincing evidence been shown that the children had good claims then the council would have wanted to compensate them appropriately without going to trial. Today that link has been established and the evidence provided. The children now call upon the council to fulfil their pre-trial promises without delay." Collins said of the legal battle: "I've been made out to be a shyster and an ambulance-chaser. The council has stonewalled, obstructed and prevaricated all the way through this. They didn't need to. If they'd ever said to us, 'Look, we're not admitting liability, but we'll co-operate with you to find out what really happened', I wouldn't have minded. Instead, they tried to shut us out and paint us as the baddies... They've tried at every turn to stop us getting at the truth. Now they claim they can't afford to pay. I'm not impressed."

Corby Borough Council's Chief Executive Chris Mallender said: "We are obviously very disappointed and very surprised at the outcome of this trial. Our position has always been that there was no link between the reclamation work that was carried out in Corby in past decades and these children's birth defects. That is still our position." He also said they were "prepared to apologise for mistakes that had been made but could not apologise until a causal link was proved between the works and the defects... We are not yet at the point of saying sorry because nobody yet is responsible."

The council's legal representatives said they were asked to advise on an appeal but had over 400 pages of judgment to review and also their client had to consider its position. The firm said it would be a few weeks before it has instructions. The statement added: "There are however some clear points to note at this stage. The case involves reclamation work going back to the 1980s. The judge concluded that this contamination affected pregnant women. A child, so affected, has 21 years from birth to make a claim and thus any work since the late 1980s which has not met the standard of care indicated in this judgment could be challenged in this way. For both local authorities and developers alike this is a significant concern because the standard of care has been drawn very highly, and could cause a rethink of the way that reclamation is carried out in the UK even though the facts of the case are historic."

Kelvin Glendenning, Labour leader of Corby Borough Council between 1984 and 1995, said "I don't think that Corby Council has anything to regret... If there was toxic waste – and I am sure there wasn't any toxic waste at all that was floating about in the air – they shouldn't be blaming us."

== Appeal ==
On 1 August 2009, it was announced that the decision by Corby Borough Council regarding whether or not to appeal against the ruling would be taken on 18 August 2009, the day before the deadline for appeal decisions to be submitted to Mr. Justice Akenhead. Unusually, the authority decided that openness and public opinion were required at the extraordinary full council sitting after which councillors would vote on whether to appeal or instead pay the compensation to 16 children who were born with birth defects.

Mallender stated: "The council is doing the right thing by reaching the decision in public. We will be starting the meeting at 6pm so we can give the opportunity for [the public] to speak," a move he said would make sure councillors' decisions reflected public opinion.

The council, which has an annual budget of £12 m, has already spent £1.9 m fighting the case and has now received a bill, as the losing party in the lawsuit, for £4.7 m from the families' solicitor.

At the meeting the council voted to appeal against the ruling but said that they would follow a "twin track" approach, preferring to attend independent mediation sessions to come to an out-of-court settlement with the families. They also stated that any mediation would include the cases of the two youngest claimants, despite these not being covered by the ruling. The chief executive gave a statement that if a causal link between the toxins and the limb deformities was ever proven he would "offer an unreserved apology", however he believed "that the judgement is unsound and will be found wanting on appeal."

== Settlement ==
The settlement was mediated by retired judge Sir Henry Brooke. Before settlement had been reached, Mallender explained: "We have reached a view that there are going to be no outright winners in this. In the circumstances we feel that it's better that we try and find a middle ground, we settle in a way that's fair to the families, but is also fair in terms of the residual burden on the council tax payer."

On 16 April 2010, the council released a joint statement with the families' solicitors announcing it was dropping its appeal and had agreed a financial settlement with 19 families. Mallender said: "The council recognises that it made mistakes in its clean-up of the former British Steel site years ago and extends its deepest sympathy to the children and their families. Although I accept that money cannot properly compensate these young people for their disabilities and for all that they have suffered to date and their problems in the future, the council sincerely hopes that this apology coupled with today's agreement will mean that they can now put their legal battle behind them and proceed with their lives with a greater degree of financial certainty." The financial terms of the settlement remained confidential, and the agreement forbids disclosure of the financial arrangements. On the subject of cost, Mallender said: "Every £1 m of cost involves a payment £5 per household in Corby on average, per year, for the next 20 years. So, simple maths: if the overall bill is £5 m, it's £25 per household for 20 years."

The settlement also encompassed three children not covered by the original ruling, including India Harrison and Ashleigh Custance.

== Implications for industry ==
Paula Jefferson, head of Beachcroft LLP's Disease Group, said: "Any organisation involved in any activity in the future, where there is the potential for release of harmful substances in to the atmosphere, should ensure that they have taken all necessary steps to identify the potential contamination and to then ensure that they either employ, or have themselves the necessary skills, to deal with that contamination. The principles in the judgment apply not just when there is demolition in progress, but to any activity where there is potential for exposure in to the atmosphere. Where there is any known potential for such exposure, then regard should be had to not just the onsite workforce but also to those living and working in the surrounding area. In the Corby case the area of risk was 4 kilometres (2.5 mi) from the demolition site. The area for potential exposure will clearly vary depending on the circumstances of each case. In essence, the message remains the same – proper risk assessment is key and must include identifying the appropriate people to do the job and not cutting corners, which, as has been proved for Corby Borough Council, is likely to be false economy."

== In popular culture ==
A four-part British drama miniseries about the case, Toxic Town, premiered on Netflix on 27 February 2025.

== See also ==
- Ravenscraig
- Spodden Valley asbestos controversy
- Camelford water pollution incident
- Love Canal
- Sydney Tar Ponds
- Toxic Town
