= Washington Works =

Chemical factory in West Virginia, U.S.

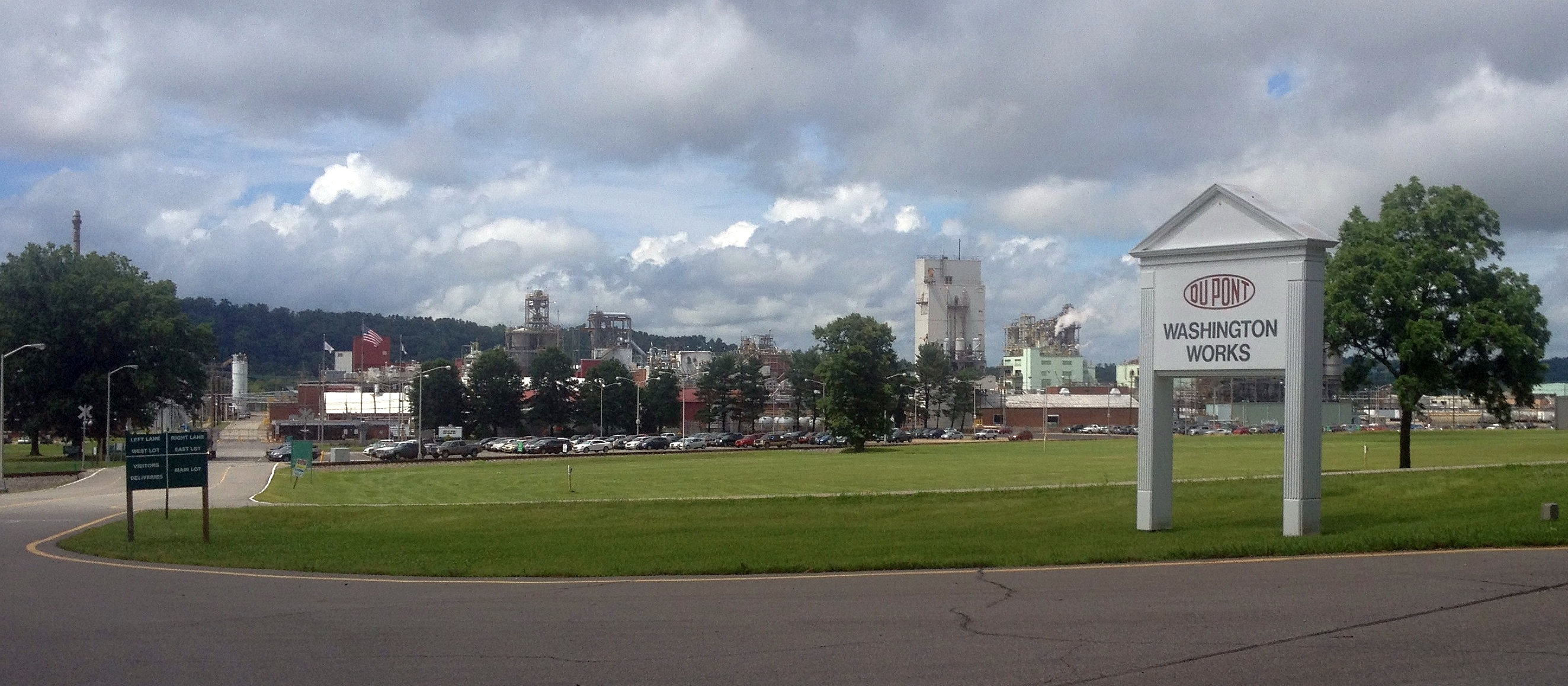
- The factory in 2014

- Location in West Virginia
- Built: 1948
- Location: Washington, West Virginia
- Coordinates: 39.27°N 81.67°W
- Industry: Chemicals
- Employees: 608, plus 432 contractors (in 2019)
- Volume: 150,000 tons per year
- Owner: Chemours

Washington Works, officially named Chemours Washington Works and previously DuPont Washington Works is a plastics factory in West Virginia, United States.

The factory was opened by DuPont chemical company in 1948 and ownership transferred to Chemours in 2015 as DuPont restructured. The factory produces chemicals used in semiconductors, the automotive industry, healthcare and non-stick products like Teflon.

Three thousand and five hundred residents were engaged in litigation against the factory following the contamination of soil and groundwater.

== Description ==
Washington Works is a plastics factory that occupies a 1,200-acre site. It is located on DuPont Road, Washington, six miles from Parkersburg, West Virginia, on the Ohio River.

== Activities ==
The factory manufactures fluoropolymers that are used in semiconductors and perfluorooctanoic acid (commonly known as C8) used to make cookware non-stick coating Teflon. In total, the factory manufactures over 150,000 tons of materials per annum.

== History ==
The factory opened in 1948 and was named after George Washington, who was granted the land in 1772.

In 1984, high levels of C8 were found during secretive tests of community drinking water in Little Hocking, Ohio, located across the Ohio River from the factory. DuPont, who did the tests, did not inform regulators of their findings until 2002.

A 98-acre wildlife habitat was created on the site in 1988. In 1989, the United States Environmental Protection Agency issued DuPont a permit to investigate soil and ground water contamination. The investigation found the four of the five waste management units on site had contaminated soil and/or groundwater. The EPA report on the contamination described the contaminants as primarily "methylene chloride, and trace levels of tetrachloroethene, and 1,1,2-trichloro-1,2,2-trifluoroethane" with lesser quantities of contamination from perfluorooctanoic acid (C8).

In 2005, residents of Parkersburg began finding level of C8 in their bloodstream at a volume that exceeded Environmental Protection Agency guidelines. Residents launched 3,500 compensation claims, blaming the factory for contaminating water, air, and soil. A DuPont-commissioned survey undertaken by ChemRisk stated that DuPont released over 1.7 million pounds of C8, 632,468 pounds of that into the Ohio River system. 394,486 pounds was reported to be buried in unlined landfills and 686,233 pounds was released into the environment via chimneys.

The factory was operated by DuPont until 2015. In 2015, DuPont formed Chemours, transferring the factory's ownership to the company. Despite the name change, the factory remained under the leadership of the same leadership team. As of 2019, Jay Valvo was the plant manager. That year there was 608 full time employees and 432 full time contractors working on site. Also using the site are Kuraray America and Celanese Corporation.

== See also ==
- List of waste disposal incidents
- Robert Bilott
