= Fred Taylor (physicist) =

British physicist and academic

Professor Taylor in March 2016

Fredric William Taylor (24 September 1944 – 16 December 2021) was a British physicist and academic. He was Halley Professor of Physics Emeritus at the University of Oxford, where he lived until his death.

== Early life and education ==
Taylor was born 24 September 1944 in Amble, Northumberland, England. His father, William, was a joiner who had been wounded in World War II, and his mother, Ena, was a teacher. In 1949, the family moved to Howick, Northumberland. He was educated at The Duke's School, then an all-boys school in Alnwick. He studied physics at the University of Liverpool, graduating with a first class Bachelor of Science (BSc) degree. He then undertook postgraduate research in atmospheric physics at Jesus College, Oxford under the supervision of Sir John Houghton, and graduated from the University of Oxford with a Doctor of Philosophy (DPhil) degree.

== Academic career ==
In 1970, Taylor joined the Jet Propulsion Laboratory of the California Institute of Technology. He was principal investigator for the first experiment into the meteorology of the atmosphere of Venus, building an instrument for the Pioneer Venus Orbiter that launched in 1978. Arriving at Venus in December 1978, this included the first British-built hardware to travel to another planet. He was also involved in the mission that sent the unmanned spacecraft Galileo to study Jupiter and its moons.

In 1980, he returned to Oxford University where he became Professor and Head of Department. Under his leadership, the Group was involved in space missions to study the atmospheres of Earth, Venus, Mars, Jupiter, Saturn and Titan, as well as Mercury, the Moon, and a comet. In 1999, one of the Oxford projects placed the first British-built hardware on the surface of Mars, albeit unwittingly.

Taylor was the author of twelve books on atmospheric and planetary physics. In September 2011, he retired from full-time academia and from the Halley Professorship of Physics. He died on 16 December 2021.

== Selected works ==
Academic

- Taylor, Fredric W. (2001). The Cambridge photographic guide to the planets. Cambridge: Cambridge University Press. ISBN 978-0521781831.
- Lopez-Puertas, Manuel; Taylor, Fredric W. (2001). Non-Local Thermodynamic Equilibrium in Atmospheres. Singapore: World Scientific. ISBN 978-9810245665.
- Taylor, F. W. (2005). Elementary climate physics. Oxford: Oxford University Press. ISBN 978-0198567332.
- Coustenis, Athena; Taylor, Fredric W. (2008). Titan: exploring an earthlike world (2nd ed.). Singapore: World Scientific. ISBN 978-9812705013.
- Taylor, Fredric W. (2010). The scientific exploration of Mars. Cambridge: Cambridge University Press. ISBN 978-0521829564.
- Taylor, F. W. (2010). Planetary Atmospheres. Oxford: Oxford University Press. ISBN 978-0199547425.
- Vardavas, Ilias; Taylor, Fredric W. (2011). Radiation and Climate (2nd ed.). Oxford: Oxford University Press. ISBN 978-0199697144.
- Taylor, Fredric W. (2014). The scientific exploration of Venus. Cambridge: Cambridge University Press. ISBN 978-1107023482.

Personal

- Taylor, Fred (2016). Exploring the Planets: A Memoir. Oxford: Oxford University Press. ISBN 978-0199671595.
