= Libby, Montana (film) =

- Directed by: Drury Gunn Carr; Doug Hawes-Davis
- Produced by: Drury Gunn Carr; Doug Hawes-Davis
- Edited by: Drury Gunn Carr; Doug Hawes-Davis
- Music by: Ned Mudd
- Release date: 2004
- Running time: 124 minutes
- Country: United States
- Language: English

Libby, Montana is a 2004 documentary film about the biggest case of community-wide exposure to a toxic substance in U.S. history. The film details the story of the iconic mountainside town of Libby, Montana and the hundreds of residents who have been exposed to asbestos, raising questions of the role of corporate power in American politics.

Libby, Montana was directed, produced, and edited by Drury Gunn Carr and Doug Hawes-Davis and was aired as part of PBS's Point of View series in 2007.

== See also ==
- Alice - A Fight For Life, a 1982 British television documentary about asbestos exposure.
