= Rose Squire =

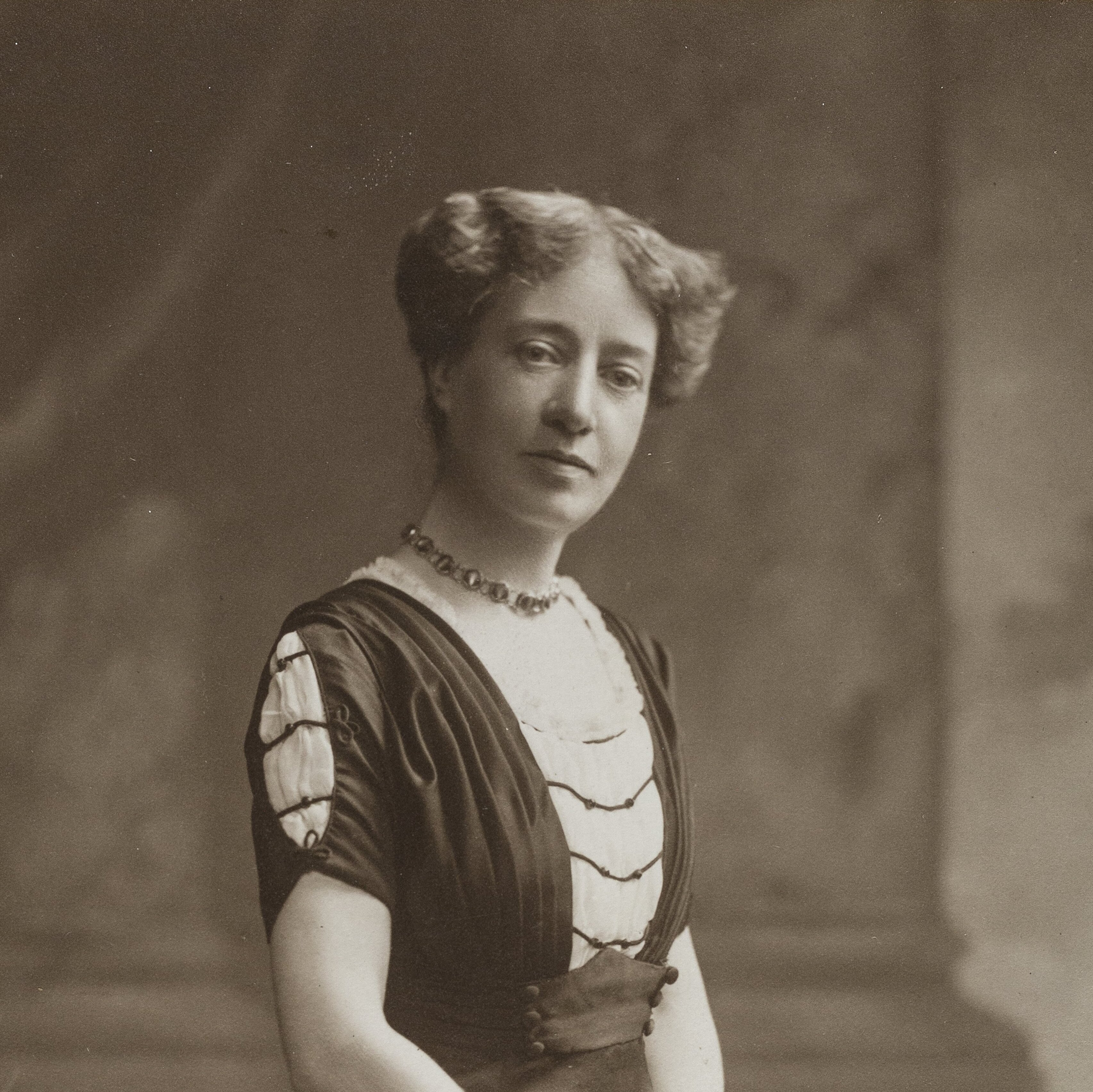
- Born: May 19, 1861; Marylebone
- Died: April 15, 1938 (aged 76); Fryerning
- Occupation: Factory inspector
- Known for: First female factory inspector in Britain

Rose Elizabeth Squire, OBE (1861–1938) was an English factory inspector. She was Britain's first female factory inspector, and later the first woman to hold an administrative position at the Home Office.

== Life ==
Rose Squire was born in London, the daughter of William Squire and his wife Martha Wilkinson. William, a Harley Street surgeon, assisted with Robert Liston's first major operation under general anesthesia and was involved in early developments with and research on thermometers and body temperature variation.

In 1893, aged 32, Squire left home in search of a career. Alongside Lucy Deane, she trained at the National Health Society in public health and nursing with the goal of becoming a lecturer; they were later selected by the Home Office to become the first two female sanitary inspectors of women's workplaces, with Squire beginning work in November 1893 and Deane shortly afterwards.

In 1894, Squire became the first woman to earn a sanitory inspector's certificate, and became a factory inspector in 1895. From 1906 to 1907, she served as a special investigator to the Royal Commission on the Poor Laws, and in that capacity co-authored a report with A. D. Steel-Maitland on the relationship of industrial and sanitary conditions to poverty.

From 1908 to 1912, Squire was based in Manchester, a city she enjoyed: "Nothing could exceed the friendliness my sister and I experienced in that atmospherically gloomy but socially bright and attractive city." Returning to London in 1912, she worked as a member of the Health of Munitions Workers Committee in the First World War, and was appointed director of the women's welfare department of the Ministry of Munitions in 1918. In 1920, she became the first woman to hold an administrative post in the Home Office.

Squire retired in 1926, receiving a message of congratulation from Queen Mary. She died in Fryerning, Essex, on 15 April 1938.

== Works ==
- (with A. D. Steel-Maitland) Report on the relation of industrial and sanitary conditions to pauperism, together with an additional memorandum on certain other points connected with the poor law system and its administration. London, Printed for H.M. Stationery Off. by Wyman and Sons, 1909.
- (with Edgar Leigh Collis and W. Sydney Smith) Report upon the conditions under which bronzing is carried on in factories and workshops, London: Printed for H.M. Stationery Off., by Darling & Son, 1910.
- Thirty years in the public service: an industrial retrospect, London: Nisbet & Co., 1927
