= Alice – A Fight For Life =

- Genre: Documentary film
- Directed by: John Willis
- Narrated by: John Willis
- Country of origin: United Kingdom
- Original language: English

Production
- Producer: John Willis
- Cinematography: Michael Gates
- Editors: John Watts; John Surtees
- Camera setup: Single-camera setup
- Running time: 94.5 minutes
- Production company: Yorkshire Television

Original release
- Network: ITV
- Release: 20 July 1982

Alice – A Fight For Life is a documentary featuring 47-year-old Alice Jefferson, a British woman who developed malignant pleural mesothelioma thirty years after working for nine months at Cape Insulation's Acre Mill asbestos plant in Hebden Bridge, West Yorkshire. The film also explored the health issues surrounding the manufacture and use of asbestos products. Described by The Guardian newspaper as "a momentous film", the programme also explicitly linked asbestos with cancer, and attacked what it perceived as the government's complacency in limiting the manufacture and use of asbestos in Britain.

Alice died of mesothelioma in February 1982, a month after filming for the programme had ended. She left two children: Paul and Patsy aged, 15 and 5 respectively.

== Background ==
John Willis, an investigative journalist described by The Times as "a digger of the first order" and by The Guardian as "one of TV's most courageous documentary writers", had previously produced two critically acclaimed exposés for Yorkshire Television, the BAFTA award winning Johnny Go Home (1975) and Rampton - The Secret Hospital (1979), which received an International Emmy Award. Between 1964-1975 the media in the United Kingdom and the United States had kept asbestos "high on the political agenda" and in the early 1970s ITV and the BBC had broadcast two programmes examining working conditions and occupational health at the Cape plant at Acre Mill. The first was World in Action: The Dust At Acre Mill, produced by Granada TV and broadcast on ITV in June 1971. This was followed in January 1975 by BBC TV's Horizon: The Killer Dust.

As a result West Yorkshire MP Max Madden lodged an official complaint alleging non-enforcement of the Asbestos Industry Regulations 1931, which led to a Parliamentary Ombudsman Report being submitted to the Ombudsman, Sir Alan Marre. The report, which was highly critical of the behaviour of the Factory Inspectors at Acre Mill, found that since the plant's closure in 1970 10% of the work force had developed asbestosis, a figure far in excess of the previously estimated exposure-risk relationship. The government responded by launching a major inquiry, the Advisory Committee on Asbestos, or "Simpson Committee", in 1976. The committee delivered two interim reports and published their final report in October 1979.

The final report "lack[ed] scientific research independent of the industrial sector" which "conditioned some of the final recommendations (e.g. on reducing threshold values and on the search for products that could replace the mineral), which were very reconciling and had very little impact on working conditions." Concerns about the effect restrictions would have on employment figures also played a part in delaying implementation of the recommendations. Dissastisfied with the findings of the report, which appeared to favour the asbestos industry's position and contained "deceptive" statements from medical professionals in the pay of the industry, John Willis, assisted by researchers James Cutler and Peter Moore, began work on Alice... in 1980.

== See also ==
- Libby, Montana (2004) - American television documentary about asbestos exposure.
