= Johore Wooden Railway =

Early railway in British Malaya

Johore Wooden Railway Keretapi Kayu Johor كريتاڤي كايو جوهر

Overview
- Status: Ceased operation
- Owner: Johor government
- Locale: Johor, Malaya
- Termini: Johor Bahru, Johor; Gunung Pulai, Johor
- Stations: 2

Service
- Type: Wooden light rail
- Services: 1
- Operator(s): Johor government
- Rolling stock: 1 steam locomotive; unknown number of railroad cars

History
- Opened: Early to mid-1870s
- Closed: 1880s

Technical
- Line length: 18 miles (29 km) planned; 10 miles (16 km) completed as of 1875
- Number of tracks: 1
- Track gauge: 1,000 mm (3 ft 3 3/8 in)

The Johore Wooden Railway (JWR) (Malay: Keretapi Kayu Johor; Jawi: كريتاڤي كايو جوهر) was an early railroad in Johor, Malaya (now Malaysia), which was intended to link Johor Bahru to an unspecified location "18 miles in the direction of Gunong Pulai". The line, which began construction in 1869 and was partially operational as of 1875, used wooden tracks, and preceded the first modern railway line operated by Perak Railway between Taiping and Port Weld by at least 10 years. By 1889, the JWR was in disuse.

== History ==
The idea of a railway line in Johor was conceived by then Maharaja of Johor, Abu Bakar, following a visit to England in 1866 where he witnessed some of the England's early railways. The new railway was to connect Johor Bahru, the capital of the Johor Sultanate, to Gunung Pulai 20 miles (32 km) away (in modern day Kulai constituency), where a sanatorium and hill resort was planned to capitalise on the location's cooler temperatures. While the line was to later pass estates and plantations, there were no reports of additional stations to be built besides the terminating two in Johor Bahru and Gunung Pulai. A decision was made to use wood for every component of the railway tracks, as such construction had proven to be feasible in the past and abundant sources of quality wood were available close to the site of the railway.

In a July 24, 1869 Singapore Daily Times article, the railway was reported to have been inaugurated by the Maharaja of Johor "in the presence of a small gathering of Europeans and Natives", and a low-powered Chaplin's contractor's locomotive was used in track building. In the years that followed, significant progress was made on track building. By the middle of 1873, 6 miles (9.7 km) of track was completed and a further 2 miles (3.2 km) of track was nearly completed. In 1875, another article indicated that 10 miles (16 km) of track and sidings had been completed with part of the line in use, passing estates and plantations. The deepest cutting was 42 feet (13 m).

The 1875 report was to be the last piece of news on the railway until an article published in 1889 reported that the line had not been in use for an unspecified time, following a train accident in which the railway's locomotive plunged into a hole, as well as damage to the tracks by termites.

== Technical details ==
=== Railway track ===
The Johore Wooden Railway was distinctive in Malaysia's railway history as its track were entirely made of wood, including the rails, sleepers, and wedges used to fasten the rails and sleepers. Although unspecified, Johor teak was suggested to be used in the production of tracks components. An estimated 90 tons of timber was used for each mile of track.

The rails were planned to be fabricated from 10-foot scantlings with a cross-section of 6 inches by 4 inches wide and would be attached to round sleepers measuring 6 3/8 feet in length, with slots the size of the rails' cross-section set on edge and keyed in by two wooden wedges driven against the rails and the sleepers. To facilitate the wheels of a locomotive, the rails projected two inches above the sleepers.

Originally assumed to adopt a 3 ft (914 mm) narrow gauge, a 1,000 mm (3 ft 3 3/8 in) metre gauge was later clarified to be favoured, standardising the railway line's gauge with those of light railways in India slated for construction beginning 1872. The railway also lacked ballasts as the Johor government was unable to afford them. Instead, the sleepers were embedded into the ground.

=== Rolling stock ===
The size and description of Johore Wooden Railway's rolling stock is uncertain. An early proposal involved the use of a Fairlie, double bogie locomotive "successfully used on the Ffestiniog Railway in Wales" and adapted to negotiate steep gradients and sharp curves, but a lack of evidence suggests no such locomotive was delivered to Malaya. In 1875, the Maharaja of Johor purchased a second-hand Indian steam locomotive, an Indian State Railway Class B 0-4-4T number B27 (number 89 on the Rajputana State Railway) manufactured by Dübs (742/1874), suggesting, while unverified, its use in the JWR. The locomotive would later change hands to serve for the Selangor State Railway to be named Lady Clarke and aid in the construction of a railway line between Klang and Kuala Lumpur, and was inherited by the Federated Malay States Railways to be used as a shunter before its scrapping in 1912.

== See also ==
- Rail transport in Malaysia
