= Turner & Newall =

Asbestos manufacturer of Manchester, UK (1871-1998)

- Industry: Building materials
- Founded: 1871
- Defunct: 1998
- Fate: Acquired
- Successor: Federal-Mogul
- Headquarters: Manchester, UK
- Products: Asbestos products

Turner & Newall was a manufacturing business based in Manchester, United Kingdom. At its peak, it was a constituent of the FT 30 index of leading companies on the London Stock Exchange. As part of their business, the company was one of the first to industrialise asbestos, and its eventual demise in 2001 left an aftermath of asbestos litigation.

== History ==
=== 1871–1920 ===
The business was founded in 1871 in Rochdale as Turner Brothers by John, Robert and Samuel Turner to manufacture cotton-cloth-based mechanical packing.

In 1879 it became the first business in the United Kingdom to weave asbestos cloth with power-driven machinery, and the company changed its name to Turner Brothers Asbestos Company.

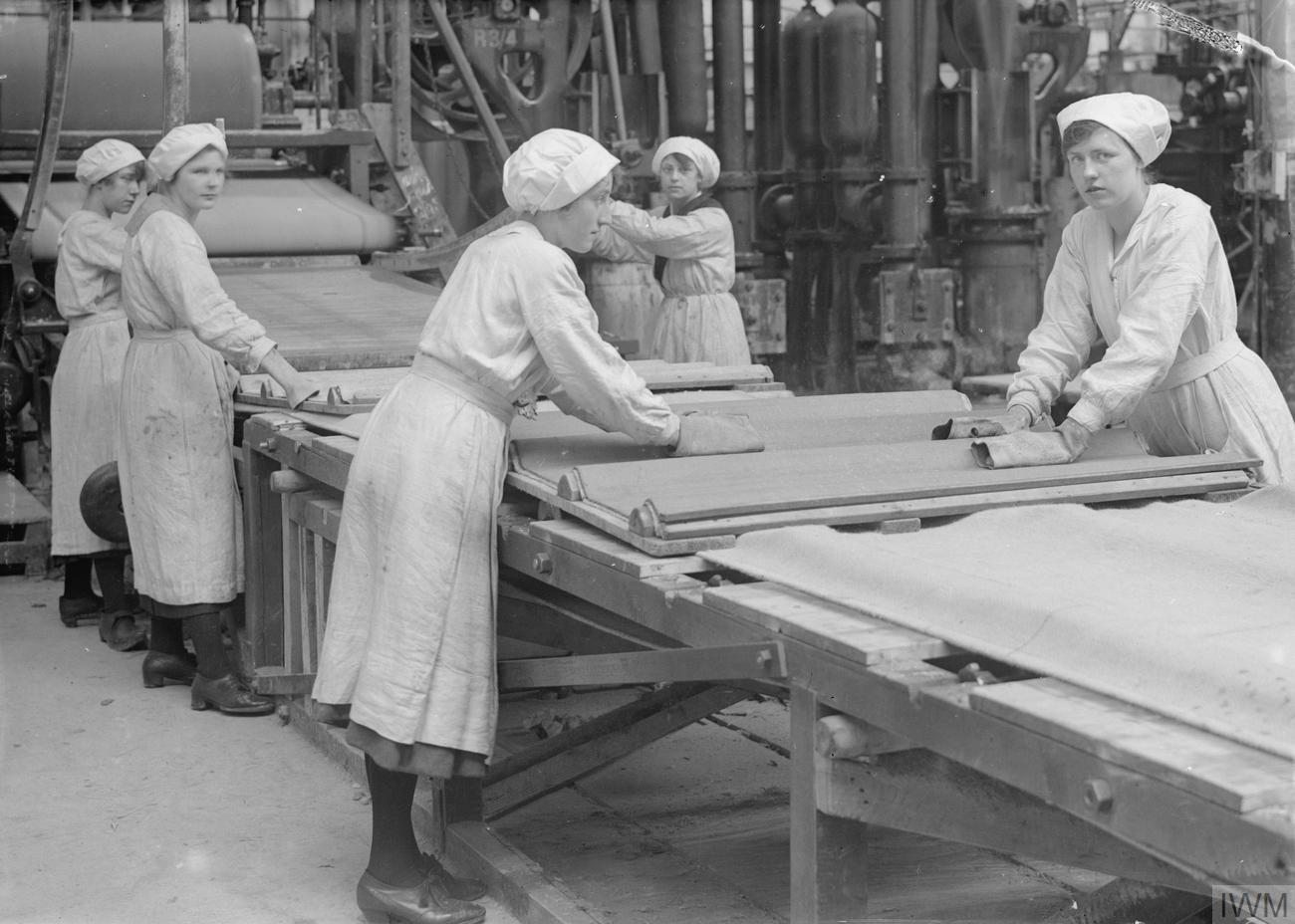
Workers forming wet sheets of asbestos into shape for roofing, Trafford Park, September 1918

Shortly before World War I the business opened an asbestos cement plant at Trafford Park. One of its major products was Trafford Tile asbestos cement sheets, which were widely used for roof and wall construction in industrial and agricultural buildings.

=== 1920–2001 ===
In 1920 it merged with the Washington Chemical Company, Newalls Insulation Company (founded as Magnesia Coverings by Frederick Newall) and J. W. Roberts to become Turner & Newall and became listed on the London Stock Exchange in that year.

The third (Sir) Samuel Turner (1878–1955) was chairman from 1929 to 1944: he endowed a School of Industrial Administration at Manchester Municipal College of Technology as well as a Dental School at the Victoria University of Manchester (the Dental School and Hospital donation was £99,000) The company's development under the third Samuel was rapid: it acquired Bells' United Asbestos Companies and several asbestos insulation companies in the UK.

The company operated a plant in Leeds where the Armley asbestos disaster occurred and which only closed in 1959.

From 1939 until 2001, the company operated an asbestos mine at Havelock in Bulembu in the Kingdom of Eswatini, Southern Africa. Since the company left, former employees have experienced sickness in their lungs because they lacked safety-wear to protect them from the hazardous material. The miners of Havelock have recently failed in their efforts to bring a legal action in Britain against the company. The attitude of management, combined with the absence of trade unions or an effective regulatory authority meant that work conditions at Havelock were harsh.

It moved its Head Office from Rochdale to Manchester in 1949. After World War II it diversified into components for the automotive industry including gaskets.

In 1953, the company bought Porters Cement Industries Ltd, a major producer of chrysotile asbestos products, based in Salisbury and Bulawayo in Southern Rhodesia, and changed its name to Turnall Fibre Cement (Pvt) Ltd. Turnall Fibre Cement Ltd still operates in Zimbabwe but as an independent company, mainly producing asbestos cement sheets and pipes. According to the company, "there is not an industrial, agricultural or residential area of Zimbabwe that does not have one or more of the company's many [asbestos cement] products in use or on display".

== Demise of the business ==
In 1998 the business was acquired by Federal-Mogul which itself got into financial difficulties and filed for Chapter 11 protection as a result of asbestos claims. In the United Kingdom the business went into administration in October 2001 leaving a pension fund deficit estimated at £400 million.

== Asbestos victims and aftermath ==
As part of their business, the company was one of the first to industrialise asbestos, and its eventual demise in 2001 became entangled with issues of asbestos litigation. Asbestos-related disease had itself become recognised due to a coroner's report into the death of Nellie Kershaw, a worker at their factory, in 1924, and various parliamentary inquiries and reports into asbestos-related disease thereafter. The company had directed their lawyers to strongly defend all such claims, due to the risk of litigation.

Following the demise of the business, UK victims of the company's asbestos pollution, such as those near to the former J.W. Roberts factory in Armley, Leeds, were offered a fraction of the compensation to which they were entitled.

The T&N Subfund of the Federal-Mogul Asbestos Trust was organised to process, liquidate, and pay all valid Asbestos Trust claims for which the T&N Entities have legal responsibility. The trust was created 27 December 2007 as a result of the confirmation of The Federal-Mogul Chapter 11 Joint Plan of Reorganization. The purpose of the trust is to provide fair, equitable and substantially similar treatment for all Trust claims that may presently exist or may arise in the future in substantially the same manner.

The Trust Distribution Procedures (TDP) approved by the bankruptcy court provide for resolving all asbestos-related personal injury and death claims caused by conduct of, and/or exposure to products for which Federal-Mogul Entities are responsible in the manner set forth for the specific Federal-Mogul Entity.

For claimants whose principal exposure to asbestos was in the United Kingdom or one of several other non-US countries, a UK Asbestos Trust was established to provide for the payment of asbestos claims in addition to the US-focused Asbestos Trust described above.

== See also ==
- Nellie Kershaw, whose death (resulting from employment at Turner & Newall) led to recognition of asbestosis as a medical condition
- Bulembu
