= Federal-Mogul =

American developer, manufacturer and supplier of industrial products pvt ltd

Federal-Mogul Holdings Corporation
- Type: Subsidiary
- Traded as: Nasdaq: FDML
- Industry: Auto parts
- Founded: 1899; 127 years ago (as the Muzzy-Lyon Company)
- Headquarters: Southfield, Michigan, United States
- Key people: Carl Icahn (chairman of the board); Rainer Jückstock (CEO, Federal-Mogul Powertrain); Brad Norton (CEO, Federal-Mogul Motorparts)
- Products: Pistons, rings, pins, liners, valve seats and guides, ignition, bearings, bushings, heat shields, sealing, systems protection, transmission, brake, chassis, wiper products
- Revenue: ▲US$7.317 billion (2014)
- Net income: ▼US$168 million (2014)
- Total assets: ▼US$7.067 billion (2014)
- Total equity: ▼US$806 million (2014)
- Number of employees: 48,600 (December 31, 2014)
- Parent: Tenneco
- Website: www.federalmogul.com

Federal-Mogul Corporation is an American developer, manufacturer, and supplier of products for automotive, commercial, aerospace, marine, rail, and off-road vehicles, as well as industrial, agricultural, and power-generation applications. It was acquired in February 2022 by Apollo Global Management.

Federal-Mogul operated two independent business divisions, Federal-Mogul Powertrain and Federal-Mogul Motor-Parts. The two divisions each had their own chief executive officer.

== History ==
=== Origins ===
Federal-Mogul was founded in 1899 in Detroit by J. Howard Muzzy and Edward F. Lyon as the Muzzy-Lyon Company. Muzzy and Lyon went into business together, producing mill supplies and rubber goods. In addition, the partners formed a subsidiary called the Mogul Metal Company, where they launched bearing innovations. Muzzy Lyon began producing bearings made from their own Babbitt metal called Mogul, an alloy of tin, antimony and copper. The product was trademarked under the names "Mogul" and "Duro". In addition to Babbitt metal, Muzzy and Lyon invented a process of custom die-casting bearings.

The Muzzy-Lyon Company's bearings business proved successful in the early 1900s and became the pair's main concern, with Buick as one of their earliest customers. In 1924, the Muzzy-Lyon Company and Federal Bearings and Bushing, an engine bearings and bushings manufacturing company founded in 1915 by a group of Detroit businessmen, merged to become the Federal-Mogul Corporation.

Federal Mogul established a research division in 1929, with the help of Battelle Memorial Institute. In 1931, during the Great Depression, Federal-Mogul started its Equi-Poise propeller division.

In 1932, the company developed a new alloy called C-100, one of the first new bearing materials since the discovery of Babbitt metal. The Federal-Mogul research team revamped the C-100 in 1934 to create a C-50 alloy.

=== Post-WWII expansion ===
In 1955, the company acquired National Motor Bearing Company, and the company name was changed to Federal-Mogul Bower.

In the late 1950s, the company opened business operations in Switzerland, and in 1962, the company established an overseas service center in Antwerp, Belgium. In 1963, Federal-Mogul Bower's Arrowhead division manufactured components for NASA's Saturn launch vehicle.

In April 1965, Federal-Mogul Bower merged with Sterling Aluminum Products. The combined company was renamed the Federal-Mogul Corporation.

In 1966, Federal-Mogul Corporation relocated its corporate headquarters from downtown Detroit to Southfield, Michigan.

In 1981, Federal-Mogul Arrowhead parts were implemented in the NASA Space Shuttle launch.

In 1981, the company attempted to patent a process for curing rubber based on the mathematical equation written by Swedish chemist Svante Arrhenius in 1889. The US Patent Office rejected Federal-Mogul's claim, on the basis that neither a formula, as a law of nature, nor a computer program based on such a formula, could be patented.

=== Bankruptcy to being acquired ===
In 1998, the company acquired the Automotive Products division of Cooper Industries, with brands including Anco wiper blades, Champion ignition, MOOG chassis, and Wagner and Blazer lighting. It also acquired Cooper's Abex Friction products business, which included asbestos-containing products. That same year, Federal-Mogul acquired Turner & Newall, a building materials company based in Manchester, UK. Turner & Newall was one of the world's largest manufacturers of asbestos-related products, including those made with blue crocidolite asbestos mined in South Africa. Turner & Newall was responsible for the Armley asbestos disaster in Leeds, UK. After the acquisition, Federal-Mogul set aside approximately $2.1 billion to cover asbestos-related claims but that amount proved insufficient. The large number of products liability claims that came with the Turner & Newall acquisition were largely responsible for Federal-Mogul's federal Chapter 11 bankruptcy filing in October 2001.

During the company's restructuring, Federal-Mogul Corporation acquired multiple companies including Robert G. Evans Co., Hanauer Machine Works, Metalic Inc., Mather Co. and Fel-Pro, Inc. The company emerged from Chapter 11 reorganization in January 2008, and in April 2008, the company listed Class A common stock on NASDAQ under the trading symbol FDML.

In June 2010, Federal-Mogul expanded further into Asia by opening a headquarters and technical center in Shanghai, China. The Asia Pacific headquarters and technical center facility contains powertrain dynamometers and vehicle braking test cells among other processes. The location allows for increased technical support to powertrain and vehicle customers as well as technology development.

Federal-Mogul acquired Daros Group in June 2010, a privately owned supplier of pistons for large bore engines used in industrial energy generation and commercial shipping. The acquisition of the group included operations in China, Sweden and Germany. The purchase of draco added two-stroke and four-stroke piston ring products to Federal-Mogul's portfolio of industrial piston rings.

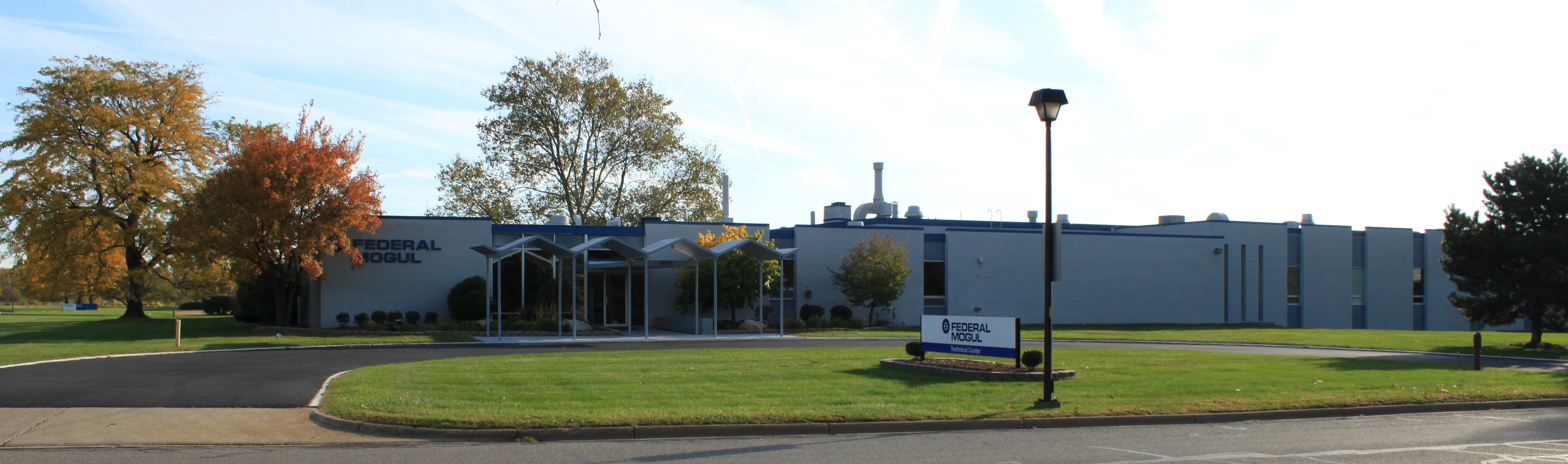
Technical Center, Ann Arbor, Michigan

In March 2012, Federal-Mogul's board of directors modified the company's corporate structure to create separate Powertrain and Vehicle Components segments, each with its own CEO. Rainer Juckstock former senior vice president of the company's Powertrain Energy business, was named CEO for the Powertrain segment effective April 1, 2012. In February 2014, Daniel A. Ninivaggi was appointed CEO of the Federal-Mogul Vehicle Components segment (VCS).

In July 2012, Federal-Mogul announced a definitive agreement to purchase the BERU spark plug business from BorgWarner Inc.

In September 2014, the company formally announced the long-awaited modification to its corporate structure - a split into two separate companies: Federal-Mogul Powertrain and Federal-Mogul Motor-Parts. The Powertrain division will focus on manufacturing and selling OEM auto parts, while the Motor-Parts division will be responsible for selling aftermarket parts. Each company will have its own CEO and corporate-level staff, who will continue to report to the board of directors of Federal-Mogul Holding Corporation. The company expects the split to be completed in the first half of 2015, pending regulatory approval.

In December 2016, Federal-Mogul completed the acquisition of the Beck/Arnley brand and certain associated assets. Based in Smyrna, Tennessee, Beck/Arnley is a provider of parts and fluids for foreign nameplate vehicles in North America.

In January 2017, majority shareholder Carl Icahn completed a $300 million deal for all of Federal-Mogul's stock, after which he changed the company from a public company to a private company.

In April 2018, Tenneco announced that they had purchased Federal-Mogul in a deal worth approximately US$5.4 billion. On October 1, 2018, Tenneco Inc. completed its acquisition.

== Company divisions ==
=== Federal-Mogul Powertrain ===
Federal-Mogul Powertrain designs and manufacturers original equipment powertrain components and system protection products in the United States and internationally, its production line consists of different products, ranging from powdered metal parts to space suits, including engine bearings, pistons, piston pins, piston rings, cylinder liners, valve seats and guides, spark plugs, ignition coils, transmission products, technical textiles and connecting rods. Bower Roller Bearing Division was a major supplier of bearings for missiles and aircraft, and for many other industries – automotive, construction machinery, machine tool and farm equipment.

=== Federal-Mogul Motor-Parts ===
Federal-Mogul Motor-Parts sells and distributes products under more than 20 brands in the global vehicle aftermarket, including ANCO wiper blades; Bentley-Harris protection solutions; Champion spark plugs, wipers and filters, BERU glow plugs; AE, Fel-Pro, Goetze, Nural, Glyco and Payen engine products; MOOG steering and suspension parts; and Ferodo and Wagner brake products.

== Awards ==
Federal-Mogul has received 16 Automotive News PACE Awards. The awards are for automotive suppliers that show innovation, technological advancement and business performance.
