= Howick, Northumberland =

Village in Northumberland, England

Coordinates: 55.451°N 1.598°W

Howick
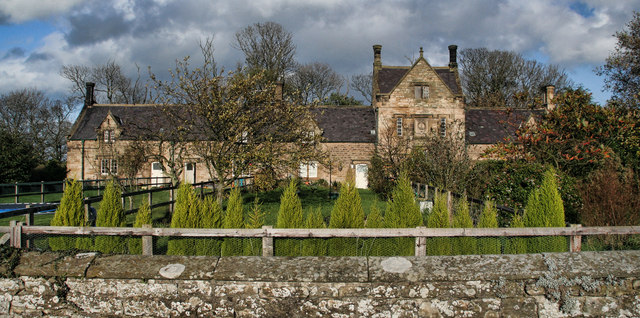
- Howick

- Location within Northumberland
- OS grid reference: NU2551
- Civil parish: Longhoughton
- Unitary authority: Northumberland
- Ceremonial county: Northumberland
- Region: North East
- Country: England
- Sovereign state: United Kingdom
- Post town: ALNWICK
- Postcode district: NE66
- Dialling code: 01665
- Police: Northumbria
- Fire: Northumberland
- Ambulance: North East
- UK Parliament: North Northumberland

Howick (/ˈhoʊɪk/ HOH-ik) (Note: Not, as commonly believed, /hɔɪk/ HOYK, as in Hawick. The pronunciation varies among the inhabitants, depending on social class; the aristocrats in the Hall use "Hoh-ick", but the villagers invariably use "How-ick".) is a village and former civil parish, now in the parish of Longhoughton, in Northumberland, England, between Boulmer and Craster. It is just inland from the North Sea, into which Howick Burn flows from Howick Hall. In 1951, the parish had a population of 246.

== History ==
In 2002 a Mesolithic house on the coast at Howick was excavated and dated to 7,800 BC

== Governance ==
On 1 April 1955 the parish was abolished and merged with Longhoughton.

== Landmarks ==
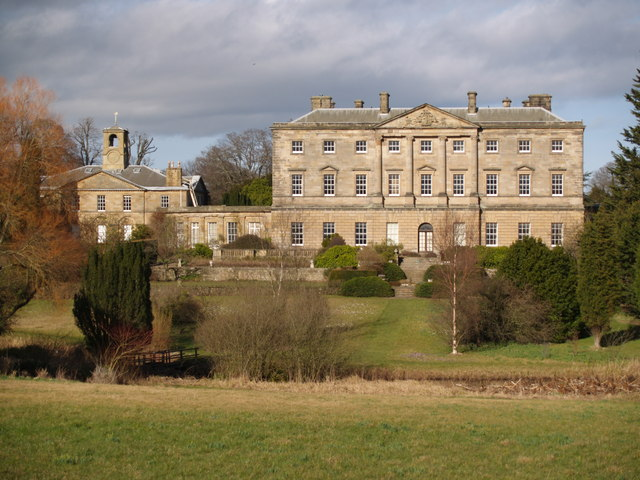
Howick Hall

Howick Hall was the seat of the Prime Minister Charles Grey, 2nd Earl Grey, after whom the famous tea is named. The original Earl Grey tea was specially blended by a Chinese mandarin to suit the water at Howick, and was later marketed by Twinings. Howick Hall Gardens & Arboretum are open to the public.

Howick is the namesake of the nearby Mesolithic Howick house archaeological site.

== Notable people ==
- Charles Grey, 2nd Earl Grey, Prime Minister of the United Kingdom, after whom the tea is named, had his seat at Howick Hall.
- Fred Taylor, Halley Professor of Physics at Oxford University, grew up in the village from age 5.

== Sources ==
- Grundy, John (2022). History of Northumberland. Newcastle upon Tyne: Tyne Bridge Publishing. ISBN 9781838280970.
