= Robert Akenhead =

British judge (born 1949)

Sir Robert Akenhead (born 15 September 1949), styled The Hon. Mr Justice Akenhead, is a British judge. He was previously a QC and Head of Chambers at Atkin Chambers, and has been a specialist in construction law since 1973.

He was educated at Rugby School and Exeter University. Called to the Bar, Inner Temple, in 1972, he later became a Bencher in 1997. He officiated as an Assistant Recorder between 1991 and 1994 and as a Recorder from 1994 until 2007, when he was appointed a Judge of the High Court, Queen's Bench Division. He was knighted in October 2007. He retired in 2015.
