= Nellie Kershaw =

Asbestosis victim (1891–1924)

- Born: 1890; Rochdale, Lancashire, England
- Died: 14 March 1924 (aged 32–33); Rochdale, Lancashire, England
- Monuments: Monument commemorating deaths due to asbestos, Rochdale
- Occupation: Asbestos-textile worker
- Employer: Turner Brothers Asbestos
- Known for: Subject of first published account of death due to asbestosis
- Spouse: Frank Kershaw

Nellie Kershaw (1890 – 14 March 1924) was an English textile worker from Rochdale, Lancashire. Her death due to pulmonary asbestosis was the first such case to be described in medical literature, and the first published account of disease attributed to occupational asbestos exposure. Before his publication of the case in the British Medical Journal, Dr William Edmund Cooke had already testified at Kershaw's inquest that "mineral particles in the lungs originated from asbestos and were, beyond reasonable doubt, the primary cause of the fibrosis of the lungs and therefore of death". Her employers, Turner Brothers Asbestos, accepted no liability for her injuries, paid no compensation to her bereaved family and refused to contribute towards funeral expenses as it "would create a precedent and admit responsibility". She was buried in a family grave at Rochdale Cemetery; this grave is not marked with a headstone. The subsequent inquiries into her death led to the publication of the first Asbestos Industry Regulations in 1931.

== Early life ==
Nellie Kershaw was born to Elizabeth and Arthur Kershaw in Rochdale in 1891. In 1903 she left school, aged 12, to take up employment as a cotton rover in a cotton mill and 5 months later began working at Garsides asbestos mill. She transferred to Turner Brothers Asbestos on 31 December 1917, where she was employed as a rover, spinning raw asbestos fibre into yarn. She was married to Frank Kershaw, a slater's labourer, and had at least one child, a daughter born in about 1920.

== Illness and death ==
She first began to exhibit symptoms in 1920 at the age of 29 but continued to work in the asbestos mill until 22 July 1922, when she was certified unfit to work. Because Kershaw's medical certificate (produced by her local physician Walter Scott Joss) recorded the diagnosis as "asbestos poisoning" she was ineligible for National Health Insurance sickness benefits. As the illness was linked to her occupation, the insurers advised her that she should instead seek sickness benefits from her employers, under the Workmen's Compensation Act, and wrote to Turner Brothers on her behalf on several occasions. However, Turner Brothers refused to pay any benefits because asbestos-related illness was not a recognised occupational disease at that time, and instructed their insurance company to "repudiate the claim" as it would be "exceedingly dangerous" to accept "any liability whatever in such a case." Percy George Kenyon, Turner's works' manager at Rochdale, wrote to Joss demanding that he "inform us what you have said to Miss [sic] Kershaw about suffering from Asbestos poisoning" and then wrote to the medical insurance board stating that "We repudiate the term "Asbestos Poisoning". Asbestos is not poisonous and no definition or knowledge of such a disease exists. Such a description is not to be found amongst the list of industrial diseases in the schedule published with the Workmen's Compensation Act."

She is known to have written to Turner Brothers herself on at least one occasion, asking: "What are you going to do about my case? I have been home 9 weeks now and have not received a penny – I think it's time that there was something from you as the National Health refuses to pay me anything. I am needing nourishment and the money, I should have had 9 weeks wages now through no fault of my own."

There is no record that she received payments of any form from any official source between July 1922 and her death. She died at 6.30 am on 14 March 1924, aged 33.

== Inquest ==
E. N. Molesworth, the coroner for Rochdale, was obliged to investigate all cases of "unnatural" death, and Dr Joss's diagnosis of "asbestos poisoning" led Molesworth to launch a formal inquest on 14 March 1924, which was adjourned awaiting an postmortem, to be conducted by F.W. Mackichan. Mackichan gave the cause of death as "pulmonary tuberculosis and heart failure" but a further adjournment was granted for microscopic examination of the lungs. When the inquest was resumed on 1 April 1924 Turner Brothers instructed a barrister, Mr McCleary, and their solicitor G.L. Collins, of Jackson & Co., to attend in order to represent their interests and to "evade any financial liability for Mrs Kershaw's death."

William Edmund Cooke, a pathologist and bacteriologist at Wigan Infirmary and Leigh Infirmary, testified that his examination of the lungs indicated old scarring indicative of a previously healed tuberculosis infection, and in addition, extensive fibrosis, in which were visible "particles of mineral matter ... of various shapes, but the large majority have sharp angles. The size varies from 393.6 to 3 μm in length." Having compared these particles with samples of asbestos dust provided by S.A. Henry, Medical Inspector of Factories, Cooke concluded that they "originated from asbestos and were, beyond a reasonable doubt, the primary cause of the fibrosis of the lungs and therefore of death".

In his written testimony to the inquest, Walter Joss stated that his diagnosis of "asbestos poisoning" was based upon his "previous experience of such a lung condition for many of his patients who were asbestos workers", and that he personally saw 10 to 12 similar cases each year, all in persons working with asbestos. Nellie's death certificate was issued 2 April 1924, citing "Fibrosis of the lungs due to the inhalation of mineral particles" as the cause of death.

In a fuller version of Kershaw's case published in the BMJ in 1927, Cooke gave the disease the name by which it is still known: "pulmonary asbestosis".

== Parliamentary inquiry ==
As a result of Cooke's paper, Parliament commissioned an inquiry into the effects of asbestos dust by E. R. A. Merewether, Medical Inspector of Factories, and C. W. Price, a factory inspector and pioneer of dust monitoring and control. Their subsequent report, Occurrence of Pulmonary Fibrosis & Other Pulmonary Affections in Asbestos Workers, was presented to parliament on 24 March 1930. It concluded that the development of asbestosis was irrefutably linked to the prolonged inhalation of asbestos dust, and included the first health study of asbestos workers, which found that 66% of those employed for 20 years or more suffered from asbestosis. The report led to the publication of the first Asbestos Industry Regulations in 1931, which came into effect on 1 March 1932.

== Memorial ==
In April 2006, a relative of Kershaw unveiled a memorial stone to asbestos victims worldwide in Rochdale. The memorial service was organised by the Save Spodden Valley campaign, an action group concerned about asbestos contamination on the former Turner's factory site where Kershaw had been employed.
