= List of early Puffin Story Books =

This is a complete list of the 149 Puffin Story Books published for children from 1941 to 1960 by Penguin Books, Harmondsworth, England.

== Introductory remarks ==
- Brief information about the content of the books is contained in the notes, where it is available. However, the content of some books is self-explanatory as in the case of biographies and books of poems by R.L. Stevenson (PS 22), Hilaire Belloc (PS 67) and Walter de la Mare (PS 70).
- The sequence of PS numbers does not always coincide with the sequence of dates of publication. For example, Fell Farm Holiday by Marjorie Lloyd was first published in 1951 but its PS no. is 54 so that it appears among the sequence of books published in 1949. The discrepancy between PS nos and publication dates is presumably because some books take longer than others to prepare for publication. Fell Farm Holiday was in fact commissioned in 1947 though it didn't appear till 1951.

== 1941–1945 ==
No.	Title	Author	Illustrator	Date	Notes
PS 1	Worzel Gummidge	Barbara Euphan Todd	Elizabeth Alldridge	1941	The scarecrow of Scatterbrook who comes alive
PS 2	Cornish Adventure	Derek McCulloch	---	1941	Tale of smugglers in Cornwall
PS 3	The Cuckoo Clock	Mary Louisa Molesworth	C.E. Brock	1941	Lonely Victorian girl's encounters with a cuckoo clock
PS 4	Garram the Hunter	Herbert Best	Erick Berry	1941	A boy of the Hill Tribes
PS 5	Smoky	Will James	Will James	1941	Story of a cowboy's horse
PS 6	The Insect Man	Eleanor Doorly	Robert Gibbings	1941	The story of children's visit to France to find out about Jean-Henri Fabre, who first understood the ways and habits of insects by long and systematic watching. Introduction by Walter de la Mare
PS 7	The Family from One End Street	Eve Garnett	Eve Garnett	1942	The Ruggles live at No. 1 One End Street in the heart of the fictional town of Otwell, located on the Ouse river. Josiah Ruggles works for Otwell council as a dustman, and his wife Rosie takes in washing. They have seven children, so life is hard, but they are a happy family
PS 8	The Microbe Man	Eleanor Doorly	Robert Gibbings	1943	A life of Louis Pasteur for children
PS 9	The Puffin Puzzle Book	W. E. Gladstone	William Grimmond	1944	The first Puffin Story Book to have an illustrated cover unique to itself.
PS 10	Tents in Mongolia	Henning Haslund-Christensen	---	1943	Adventures and experiences among the nomads of Central Asia. A youth edition prepared by Eleanor Graham
PS 11	Carcajou	Rutherford Montgomery	L.D. Cram	1944	Story of the snowy North and of Carcajou, a wolverine or skunk-bear
PS 12	Mourzouk: The Story of a Lynx	Vitaly Valentinovich Bianki	Y. Charushkin & V. Kobelev	1944	Translated by Ivy Low, afterwards Litvinova
PS 13	Jungle John	John Austin Budden	H. J. P. Browne	1944	A book of the Big-Game Jungles
PS 14	Jehan of the Ready Fists	Magdalen King-Hall	A. H. Hall	1944	Thrilling adventures in the Holy Land with the extraordinary, the invincible Good King Richard the Lionheart
PS 15	Gay Neck: The Story of a Pigeon	Dhan Gopal Mukerji	Boris Artzybasheff	1944	The story of the training of a carrier pigeon and its service during the First World War, revealing the bird's courageous and spirited adventures over the housetops of an Indian village, in the Himalayan Mountains, and on the French battlefield
PS 16	My Friend Mr. Leakey	J. B. S. Haldane	---	1944	Stories of a Magician and Magic
PS 17	Afke's Ten	Nienke van Hichtum	J M Kupfer	1945	Translated from the Dutch by Marie Kiersted Pidgeon
PS 18	Palaces on Monday	Marjorie Fischer	Richard Floethe	1945	An amusing account of a brother and sister who travel through the Soviet Union on their way to meet their father, an American engineer employed upon an important project
PS 19	Coconut Island	Robert Gibbings	Robert Gibbings	1945	The adventure of Two Children in the South Seas
PS 20	Flaxen Braids: A Chapter From a Real Swedish Childhood	Annette Turngren	Dorothy Bayley	1945	Cover illustration by Grace W. Gabler
PS 21	We'll Meet in England	Kitty Barne	Steven Spurrier	1945	The scene is conquered Norway, the characters are three young people, brother and two sisters; their mother, an English woman who had married a Norwegian. The story is about their escape from Nazi occupation.
PS 22	A Child's Garden of Verses	Robert Louis Stevenson	Eve Garnett	1947	
PS 23	Ferry the Fearless	Carola Oman	---	1945	Story of the Third Crusade, 1189–1192
PS 24	Greentree Downs	M. I. Ross	---	1945	An unusual story of the adventures of four children who are adopted by an Australian uncle, a miser with a heart of gold. The characters have much more individuality than is usual in books of this kind.

== 1946–1949 ==
No.	Title	Author	Illustrator	Date	Notes
PS 25	David Goes to Zululand	K. Marshall	Gwen White	1946	A London boy's adventures in Africa
PS 26	Starlight	Harry Mortimer Batten	---	1946	A wolf's life in the Canadian wilds
PS 27	Stormalong	Alan Villiers	William Grimmond	1946	The story of a boy's voyage round the world in a full-rigged ship
PS 28	North after Seals	Thames Ross Williamson	Arthur H. Hall	1946	Two boys on a sealing expedition
PS 29	No Other White Men	Julia Davis	John Harwood	1946	A true story of adventure. The first white men sail the Missouri
PS 30	Worzel Gummidge and Saucy Nancy	Barbara Euphan Todd	John Harwood	1947	A ship's figurehead comes to life
PS 31	Jam Tomorrow	Monica Redlich	Jack Matthew	1947	Cover illustration by Grace Gabler. A holiday, a secret passage, and a discovery. An unusual family story, amusing yet realistic
PS 32	Red Ruff	Mortimer Batten	A. H. Hall	1947	The life story of a fox. A first-class story that rings true and tells a great deal about the lives and characteristics of the foxes in the British Isles
PS 33	The Incredible Adventures of Professor Branestawm	Norman Hunter	W. Heath Robinson	1946	The wonderfully nutty, fabulously entertaining mishaps of Professor Branestawm. He's madly sane and cleverly dotty. He is the most absent-minded inventor you'll ever meet and no matter how hard he tries his brilliant ideas never seem to keep him out of crazy scrapes
PS 34	Kidnapped	R. L. Stevenson	Anthony Lake	1946	A classic adventure story in the Scottish Highlands of the 18th century
PS 35	Alice in Wonderland	Lewis Carroll	John Tenniel	1946	With 42 illustrations by Tenniel
PS 36	Treasure Island	R. L. Stevenson	Anthony Lake	1946	A classic treasure seeking story of the 18th century
PS 37	South Country Secrets	Euphan (Barbara Euphan Todd) and Klaxon	William Grimmond	1947	The South Country's secrets are about smugglers, wishing wells, Roman villas, and such strange things as a wall made of bullock horns. "Klaxon" was the pseudonym of Euphan's husband John Graham Bower
PS 38	Cranes Flying South	N. Karazin	N. Karazin	1948	The story of a crane migrating from the Ostashkov swamps to the Upper Nile. The book combines an interesting story, geographic descriptions of the places the crane flew and illustrations by the author. Cover illustration by Sylvia Dyson
PS 39	Columbus Sails	C. Walter Hodges	C. Walter Hodges	1947	A stirring tale of Christopher Columbus's expedition into the Western Seas to discover gold for Spain
PS 40	Discovery or the Spirit and Service of Science	Sir Richard Gregory	John Baynes	1949	The story of scientific discovery written for children
PS 41	Ballet Shoes	Noel Streatfeild	Ruth Gervis	1949	Relates the fortunes of three adopted sisters who take dancing and stage training, one to become an actress, the second a ballerina, and the third an aviatrix
PS 42	The Secret of Dead Man's Cove	R. J. McGregor	Wiliam Grimmond	1948	The Further Adventures of The Young Detectives (See PS 47 below)
PS 43	Tomorrow is a New Day	Jennie Lee	---	1948	The life story of a miner's daughter who, through hard work and ability, became a Member of Parliament
PS 44	Through the Looking Glass	Lewis Carroll	John Tenniel	1948	
PS 45	Mr. Sheridan's Umbrella	L. A. G. Strong	C. Walter Hodges	1948	Smuggling and adventure in Regency times
PS 46	Susannah of the Mounties	Muriel Denison	Marguerite Bryant	1948	An English girl among the Red Coats. Susannah stays with a relative while her parents are posted elsewhere in the British empire of the 1890s. In this case the relative with whom Susannah is sent to stay (with virtually no notice whatsoever) is a bachelor army officer posted in the wilds of Canada. She is not welcome. However, despite a sad habit of disobeying the rules, Susannah soon wins the hearts of minds of those around her, including those of both her uncle and the fort commander.
PS 47	The Young Detectives	R. J. McGregor	William Grimmond	1948	A first rate family story with more than a mere spice of adventure in it. The five Mackie children had the rare good luck to find, in a house taken for the holidays in Devon, a secret passage leading to a smuggler's cave.
PS 48	Golden Island	Denis Clark	---	1948	Though this is a strange tale of adventure long ago, it is also a stirring lively story of elephants
PS 49	Young Walter Scott	E. Janet Gray	A. H. Hall	1948	A rich story of schoolboy life in Edinburgh long ago based loosely on the life of Sir Walter Scott
PS 50	Children of the New Forest	Frederick Marryat	---	1948	A stirring tale of children surviving the English Civil War of the 17th century
PS 51	The Grey Goose of Kilnevin	Patricia Lynch	---	1951	The grey goose sets off to market to see the world and finds Sheila, a young girl working in one of the inns in Kilnevin. Sent to get 3 lbs of butter from Bridgie Swallow, Sheila and the goose embark on an adventure, strange and magical enough to rival Alice in Wonderland.
PS 52	Grimms' Fairy Tales	the Brothers Grimm	George Cruikshank	1948	
PS 53	Street Fair	Marjorie Fischer	S. Dyson	1949	Two American children on holiday in France John and Anna were bored with all the sightseeing on their summer holiday but one night they slipped out by themselves
PS 54	Fell Farm Holiday	Marjorie Lloyd	William Grimmond	1951	The five Brownes and their domestic and holiday adventures in the Lake District.
PS 55	Strangers at the Fair	Patricia Lynch	Eileen Coghlan	1949	Eighteen short stories about Ireland
PS 56	Dickon Among the Indians	M. R. Harrington	Clarence Ellsworth	1949	Dickon was an English boy, sole survivor of a wreck, who was thrown up on the coast of Virginia, country then of the Lenape Indians

== 1950–1955 ==
No.	Title	Author	Illustrator	Date	Notes
PS 57	Ditta's Tree	Jean Gordon Hughes	Mary Willett	1952	A sprite who lives in a tree in an Indian village is upset when the arrival of a red automobile makes the villagers forget to bring him the customary offerings of food and flowers
PS 58	The Hut-man's Book	G. D. Fisher	E. V. Shaw	1950	Living in a hut out in the fields alone with his dog, watching the wild life about him, exploring round about the woods and fields by night as well as by day, in winter as well as in summer – that is what makes this book different from many other story-books of natural history
PS 59	Fairy Tales from the Isle of Man	Dora Broome	John Harwood	1951	
PS 60	Tarka the Otter	Henry Williamson	C. F. Tunnicliffe A.R.A.	1949	This famous story of an otter is as true as long observation and keen insight could make it. It lets you live with Tarka and see at his level the wild life of that stretch of Devon country which runs from Dartmouth to the sea
PS 61	Worzel Gummidge Again	Barbara Euphan Todd	John Harwood	1949	Another book about the scarecrow
PS 62	The Adventures of Tom Sawyer	Mark Twain	A. H. Hall	1950	Tom Sawyer, a young scamp, who used to play truant and find his fun along the shores of the Mississippi. He shared it with Jim, the escaped Negro slave boy, and Huckleberry Finn, who, as son of the village drunkard, was very much of an outcast
PS 63	A Woman Among Savages	Helen Simpson	Faith Jaques	1950	this is the story of Mary Kingsley and her travels in West Africa from 1893 onwards
PS 64	Black Beauty	Anna Sewell	Charlotte Hough	1954	Classic horse tale
PS 65	Elizabeth Fry, A story biography	Kitty Barne	---	1950	
PS 66	Landfall: The Unknown	Evelyn Cheesman	---	1950	The 'landfall' is on Lord Howe Island in 1788
PS 67	Selected Cautionary Verses	Hilaire Belloc	B.T.B. and Nicholas Bentley	1950	
PS 68	The Radium Woman	Eleanor Doorly	Robert Gibbings	1953	The Radium woman was Madame Curie, the great scientist who discovered Radium. This account of her life is inspiring and can be read simply as a magnificent story, as well as to see how a child grew to be one of the modern world's most famous scientists
PS 69	The Secret Garden	Frances Hodgson Burnett	Astrid Walford	1953	Poor Mary! She was a forlorn, unwanted, disagreeable child when, after cholera had carried off her parents, she was brought from India to live at the great lonely house on the bleak Yorkshire moors. Wandering in the gardens, she found one that was walled in. The book tells the story of how she got inside and what happened to her there.
PS 70	Selected Stories and Verses	Walter De La Mare O.M.	R. Kennedy	1952	
PS 71	Bird Watching for Beginners	Bruce Campbell	R. A. Richardson	1952	Cover illustration by James Arnold. This is a sound and practical guide to bird watching for beginners of any age, easy to read and very clearly expressed. There is sensible advice on the elements of the hobby, and on the first need of all – to be able to identify your bird – on useful reference books, local museums and societies. It emphasises that bird watching is the study of the living bird, and has nothing to do with the collection of stuffed birds or blown eggs
PS 72	A Puffin Book of Verse	Eleanor Graham (ed)	Claudia Freedman	?	-
PS 73	King Arthur and His Knights of the Round Table	Roger Lancelyn Green	Lotte Reiniger	1953	The King Arthur stories have been told afresh from the original sources, vividly so that the simple plot emerges plainly and is exciting to follow through all the detail of feasting and jousting and the fearful impact of knights in armour
PS 74	Five Proud Riders	Ann Stafford	Charlotte Hugh	1953	The proud riders were on New Forest ponies, and this is the story of their first riding holiday alone in the New Forest. There were five of them, boys and girls between 10 and 14
PS 75	To School in the Spanish Main	Alice Berry-Hart	Richard Kennedy	1953	School life in Central America
PS 76	Little Women	Louisa M. Alcott	Astrid Walford	1953	Classic 19th century story. The novel follows the lives of four sisters – Meg, Jo, Beth, and Amy March – and is loosely based on the author's childhood experiences with her three sisters
PS 77	The Wanderings of Mumfie	Katharine Tozer	Katharine Tozer	1955	Mumfie is a 'nelifunt', a toy that is put into Tommy's stocking by Father Christmas. On Christmas morning, Mumfie realises that Father Christmas forgot to put his best friend Scarecrow in Tommy's stocking so Mumfie decides to search for Scarecrow. The novel is the subject of an animated movie and television series by Britt Allcroft called Magic Adventures of Mumfie
PS 78	The Moor of Spain	Richard Parker	John Harwood	1953	This is a fine story of adventure, swift moving full of colour, violent action, set in the time of Christopher Columbus. The Moor is fourteen when the tale begins and eventually he sails with Columbus on the Santa Maria to the Americas
PS 79	Melissa Ann	Ethel Parton	Sylvia Dyson	1955	A tale of Regency times
PS 80	The Adventures of Huckleberry Finn	Mark Twain	A. H. Hall	1953	Huck was the disreputable boy in The Adventures of Tom Sawyer. He was 14 when got away from his drunken father and, running for his life, met old Jim, also on the run. Together on a raft they tumbled in and out of fantastic experiences that were part of the life of the great, busy Mississippi which the author knew so well
PS 81	Family Afloat	Aubrey de Sélincourt	Guy de Sélincourt	1954	Elizabeth, Anne, father, mother, and Uncle Bob make up the family party which set out for a sailing holiday in the 'Tessa'. No one could have foreseen all that happened on the eventful cruise or that they would have to rescue two Frenchmen out of the sea at dead of night.
PS 82	The Road to Ticonderoga or, The Long Portage	Herbert Best	Erick Berry	1954	An 18th century tale about the strategic river portage on the La Chute River between Lakes Champlain and George. It was the trade link between British-controlled Hudson River Valley and the French-controlled Saint Lawrence River Valley
PS 83	The Meeting Pool	Mervyn Skipper	Sheila Hawkins	1954	There is a sparkling freshness and humour in these tales of the animals of the Borneo jungle, where no animal was permitted to kill. The animals were worried because the White Man was coming closer and closer to their haunts, chopping down the trees and burning them
PS 84	Enjoying Paintings	A. C. Ward	---	1954	
PS 85	Going to a Concert	Lionel Salter	---	1954	
PS 86	Going to the Ballet	Arnold Haskell	---	1954	
PS 87	Fell Farm for Christmas	Marjorie Lloyd	---	1954	Sequel to Fell Farm Holiday - PS 54 above
PS 88	Long Ears	Patricia Lynch	Sheila Hawkins	1954	The story of a little grey donkey
PS 89	Thimble Summer	Elizabeth Enright	Elizabeth Enright	1955	Garnet Linden, a nine-year-old girl who lives on a farm in Wisconsin with her two brothers. After finding a silver thimble, a drought ends, and she begins to have delightful adventures: being accidentally locked in the town library; hitchhiking to the nearest city, New Conniston; entering her prized pig into a regional fair.
PS 90	Malay Adventure	J. S. Phillips	Stanislaus Brien	1955	A 19th-century tale of pirate war boats and of British sailors rowing up tropical rivers to smoke the pirates from their stockades
PS 91	The Children who lived in a Barn	Eleanor Graham	Mary Gernat	1955	The Dunnet children's parents leave suddenly to see to the ailing grandmother somewhere in Europe. They tell the children that they are old enough to look after themselves - rather that Susan (aged 13) and Bob (aged 11) are quite capable of looking after twins Joseph and Samuel (aged 9) and baby of the family Alice (aged 6). Quickly evicted from their rented cottage, the children set up home in a nearby barn where the adventure rapidly becomes a saga of survival against starvation and the attentions of local busybodies
PS 92	The Puffin Quiz Book	Norman & Margaret Dixon	John Woodcock	1956	
PS 93	Boy of the Indian Frontier	Wray Hunt	Alfred Hackney	1955	The exciting story of the son of a native officer who saves the regiment from annihilation
PS 94	The Heir of Charlecote	Mark Dallow	Arthur Hall	1955	An adventure story, set in 16th century England

== 1956–1960 ==
Number	Title	Author	Illustrator	Date	Notes
PS 95	The White Riders	Monica Edwards	Geoffrey Whittam	1956	More adventures on the Romney Marsh. The characters try to frighten away a property developer by recreating the ghostly White Riders from the past.
PS 96	The Circus Is Coming	Noel Streatfeild	Clarke Hutton	1956	The story of a brother and sister, Peter (aged 12) and Santa (aged 11). When their aunt dies, there are plans to send them to orphanages. They don't want to be separated, so they run away to their Uncle Gus, who works for a circus. During the summer, in travelling with the circus, they mature and find their places in the circus community.
PS 97	Heidi	Johanna Spyri	Cecil Leslie	1956	Translated by Eileen Hall. This is the classic story of the little girl who goes to live with her grandfather who lives in seclusion. She charms and softens her grumpy grandpa and later helps a crippled girl to regain her health and walk again.
PS 98	The Magic Pudding	Norman Lindsay	Norman Lindsay	1957	Being the Adventures of Bunyip Bluegum and His Friends Bill Barnacle and Sam Sawnoff
PS 99	Man-Shy	Frank Dalby Davison	---	1956	The story of a red heifer (a young cow before she has had her first calf) who learned to value freedom above everything
PS 100	The Puffin Song Book	Leslie Woodgate	Heather Standring	1956	Contents include music/lyrics for Curly Locks, Baa, Baa, Black Sheep, Bells of Aberdovey, Heidenröslein, I Saw Three Ships, etc. Well over 100 pieces. Arranged mostly for voice and piano, but also for other instruments. Also includes Cockles and Mussels, Lavender's Blue, and When Johnny Comes Marching Home, as well as carols.
PS 101	Robin Hood	Roger Lancelyn Green	---	1956	
PS 102	Four Mysteries solved by Norman & Henry Bones	Anthony C. Wilson	Elizabeth Andrews	1957	Norman and Henry Bones, the boy detectives, famous in the B.B.C.'s Children's Hour, in four stories of mystery and detection. The boys are cousins, who live the same Norfolk village. Henry is fourteen, Norman two years older. They cycle around, and know everyone within miles of their homes. They are on pleasant terms with the local police - and they always play fair!
PS 103	Redcap Runs Away	Rhoda Power	C. Walter Hodges	1957	It tells the story of a 10-year-old boy who takes up with a band of minstrels in 14th century before the Black Death
PS 104	Savage Gold	Roy Fuller	Robert Medley	1957	A South African tale of adventure
PS 105	The Secret of Smugglers' Wood	R J McGregor	Elizabeth Andrews	1957	
PS 106	Storm Ahead	Monica Edwards	Geoffrey Whittam	1957	Further adventure on the Romney Marsh with the characters dealing with the effects of a severe storm on their village. They must deal with floods, homelessness and other misfortunes.
PS 107	Moon Ahead	Leslie Greener and John Hutchinson	William Pene du Bois	1957	A thriller about a flight to the Moon, a race between the genuinely scientific party and a gang of crooks who need to get there first in order to claim control for the sake of its rich mineral resources. This is a shortened version of the original edition leaving out lengthy technical discussions
PS 108	Magic in my Pocket	Alison Uttley	Judith Brook	1957	A selection of children's tales from Uttley's books
PS 109	The Haunted Reef	Frank Crisp	R. M Powers	1957	A boy's dreams of living in the South Pacific atolls are brought to life in this adventure story about boats, lost ships and treasure-seeking.
PS 110	The Borrowers	Mary Norton	---	1957	
PS 111	King Solomon's Mines	H. Rider Haggard	---	1958	
PS 112	The Second Puffin Puzzle Book	W. E. Gladstone	Nigel Tuckley	1958	
PS 113	The Perilous Descent into a Strange Lost World	Bruce Carter	---	1958	During the Second World War, two airmen are shot down and discover the entrance to an underground world.
PS 114	The Singing Forest	H. Mortimer Batten	Maurice Wilson	1958	Story of birds and animals in the forest
PS 115	Bush Holiday	Stephen Fennimore	Ninon MacKnight	1958	The story of a boy's adventures in the Australian outback
PS 116	The Story of the Treasure Seekers	E. Nesbit	Cecil Leslie	1958	The adventures of the Bastable children as they attempt to retrieve the family fortunes
PS 117	Going into the Past	Gordon J. Copley	---	1958	Basic early history and archaeology with chapters on different periods from the Stone Age to the post Roman period
PS 118	Going to the Opera	Lionel Salter'	---	1958	
PS 119	Tales of the Greek Heroes	Roger Lancelyn Green	Heather Copley and Christopher Chamberlain	1958	Cover illustration by Betty Middleton-Sandford
PS 120	The Tale of Troy	Roger Lancelyn Green	Pauline Baynes	1958	Cover illustration by Betty Middleton-Sandford. A collection of nineteen Greek myths and legends including such tales as The Story of Prometheus, The Wanderings of Heracles, The Quest for the Golden Fleece, and The First Fall of Troy
PS 121	Puffin Quartet of Poets	Eleanor Farjeon, James Reeves, E V Rieu, Ian Serraillier		1958	An anthology of poetry, selected with introductory notes by E. Graham
PS 122	The Wouldbegoods	E. Nesbit	Cecil Leslie	1958	
PS 123	My Naughty Little Sister	Dorothy Edwards	---	1959	
PS 124	Little Pete Stories	Leila Berg	Henrietta Garland	1959	
PS 125	Adventures of the Little Wooden Horse	Ursula Moray Williams	Peggy Fortnum	1959	
PS 126	Emil and the Detectives	Erich Kastner	Walter Trier	1959	
PS 127	The Cave Twins	Lucy Fitch Perkins	Lucy Fitch Perkins	1959	Story about prehistoric cave children
PS 128	Five Children and It	E. Nesbit	---	1959	
PS 129	The Phoenix and the Carpet	E. Nesbit	H. R. Millar	1959	
PS 130	The Story of the Amulet	E. Nesbit	H. R. Millar	1959	
PS 131	Avalanche!	A. Rutgers van der Loeff	Alie Evers	1959	
PS 132	The Lion, the Witch, and the Wardrobe	C. S. Lewis	Pauline Baynes	1959	
PS 133	The Good Master	Kate Seredy	Kate Seredy	1959	The Good Master is set in the Hungarian countryside before World War I and tells the story of wild young Kate, who goes to live with her Uncle's family when her father can't control her.
PS 134	Sabotage at the Forge	Richard Armstrong	L. F. Lupton	1960	
PS 135	The Story of Jesus	Eleanor Graham	Brian Wildsmith	1959	
PS 136	Six Great Englishmen	Aubrey de Selincourt	---	1960	Drake, Dr. Johnson, Nelson, Marlborough, Keats, Churchill
PS137	The Namesake	C. Walter Hodges	---	1960	
PS 138	The Borrowers Afield	Mary Norton	---	1960	
PS 139	The Saga of Asgard	Roger Lancelyn Green	Brian Wildsmith	1960	Also called 'Myths of the Norsemen' ?
PS 140	Fell Farm Campers	Marjorie Lloyd	Shirley Hughes	1960	
PS 141	Eleanor Farjeon's Book: Stories, Verses, Plays	Eleanor Farjeon, James Reeves, E.V. Rieu and Ian Serraillier	Edward Ardizzone	1960	
PS 142	The Second Puffin Quiz Book	Norman and Margaret Dixon	---	1960	
PS 143	A Hundred Million Francs	Paul Berna	---	1960	
PS 144	Snow Cloud Stallion	Gerald Raftery	Barrie Driscoll	1959	A young boy, working on his uncle's farm in Vermont, finds wild horse that had been badly treated first. He slowly tames Snow Cloud which saves a man and becomes a hero
PS 145	The Orphans of Simitra	Paul-Jacques Bonzon	---	1969	
PS146	The Silver Sword	Ian Serraillier	C. Walter Hodges	1960	
PS 147	The Railway Children	E. Nesbit	C. E. Brock	1960	Classic tale of children living by a railway.
PS 148	Four Feet and Two: An Anthology of Verse	Leila Berg (ed.)	Shirley Burke and Marvin Bileck	1960	
PS 149	Lucky Dip	Ruth Ainsworth	Geraldine Spence	1960	A selection of stories and verses

== Sources ==
- Library catalogues such as the British Library, World Catalogue, National Library of Scotland, Open Library etc.
- Bookselling websites such as Amazon, abebooks, ebay
- Phil Baines, Puffin by Design: 70 Years of Imagination 1940–2010, London: Allen Lane, 2010.
- Basic list of Puffin books till the 1960s to be found in this checklist: http://penguinchecklist.wordpress.com/puffin-books-pre-isbn Accessed 2012-06-23
- Richard Williams, PUFFIN STORY BOOKS, PS 1 - PS 148, 1941–1960, British Paperback Checklist No. 33, 2010. This checklist contains valuations, publisher information, names of illustrators, and alphabetic lists of books, authors and illustrators. Available at http://www.abebooks.com/richard-sylvanus-williams-1976-north-lincolnshire/465871/sf Accessed 2014-07-15
