= Havighurst =

Havighurst is a surname. Notable people with the surname include:

- Marion Havighurst (1894–1974), American poet, novelist, and author of children's books
- Robert J. Havighurst (1900–1991), American academic and writer
- Walter Havighurst (1901–1994), American academic and writer, brother of Robert
