= Erick Berry =

American novelist (1892–1974)

- Born: Allena Champlin; January 4, 1892; New Bedford, Massachusetts
- Died: February 1974 (aged 82)
- Occupations: Writer, illustrator
- Spouse: Herbert Best
- Writing career
- Genre: Children's literature
- Notable works: Garram the Hunter: A Boy of the Hill Tribes; The Apprentice of Florence; Winged Girl of Knossos; Song of the Pines

Evangel Allena Champlin Best (January 4, 1892 – February 1974), better known by her pen name Erick Berry, was an American author, illustrator and editor.

== Early and personal life ==
Berry was born on January 4, 1892, in New Bedford, Massachusetts. She was married at least twice, the second time to fellow writer Herbert Best. She derived her pen name from her interest in Eric Pape and the surname of her first husband. Berry died in February 1974 at the age of 82.

== Career ==
Berry published many children's books from the 1930s to the 60s, and worked as an author, illustrator, and editor. Perhaps the most popular book she wrote was 1933's Winged Girl of Knossos, which she also illustrated. It won a Newbery Honor in 1934. In that year, Anne Dempster Kyle's The Apprentice of Florence, illustrated by Berry, won the same award. She also illustrated several of her husband Best's works, one of which, Garram the Hunter: A Boy of the Hill Tribes, also won a Newbery Honor. She also edited at least one publication, Walter and Marion Havighurst's 1949 children's historical novel Song of the Pines.

== Bibliography ==
=== As author ===
==== As sole author ====
- Girls in Africa: 1928 (also illustrated)
- Penny-whistle: 1930 (also illustrated)
- Humbo the Hippo and Little-Boy-Bumbo: 1932 (also illustrated)
- Winged Girl of Knossos: 1933 (also illustrated)
- Cynthia Steps Out: 1937
- Homespun: 1937 (illustrated by Harold von Schmidt)
- Honey of the Nile: 1938 (also illustrated)
- Hudson Frontier: 1942 (also illustrated)
- Sybil Ludington's Ride: 1952 (also illustrated)
- Hay-Foot, Straw-Foot: 1954 (also illustrated)
- Green Door to the Sea: 1955 (also illustrated)
- Horses for the General: 1956 (also illustrated)
- The Land and People of Finland: 1959
- The Land and People of Iceland: 1959
- The Four Londons of William Hogarth: 1964
- You Have Got to Go Out: The Story of the United States Coast Guard: 1964
- Mr. Arctic: An Account of Vilhjalmur Stefansson: 1966
- The Springing of the Rice: A Story of Thailand: 1966 (illustrated by John Kaufmann)
- When Wagon Trains Rolled to Santa Fe: 1966 (illustrated by Charles Waterhouse)
- The Magic Banana and Other Polynesian Tales: 1968 (illustrated by Nicholas Amorosi)
- A World Explorer: Fridtjof Nansen: 1969 (illustrated by William Hutchinson)

==== With Herbert Best ====
- Concertina Farm: 1943
- Men Who Changed the Map: 1968
- The Polynesian Triangle: 1968

=== As illustrator ===
==== Books by Herbert Best ====
- Garram the Hunter: A Boy of the Hill Tribes: 1930
- Tal of the Four Tribes: 1938
- Gunsmith's Boy: 1942
- The Long Portage: A Story of Ticonderoga and Lord Howe: 1948
- Not Without Danger: 1951
- The Columbus Cannon: 1954
- Underwater Warriors: Story of the American Frogmen: 1967

==== Books by other authors ====
- Pinky Pup and The Empty Elephant - Dixie Willson: 1928
- This Side of Jordan - Roark Bradford: 1929 (Harper & Brothers) and 1930 (William Heinemann Ltd)
- Bee of the Cactus Country — Nora Archibald Smith: 1932
- The Apprentice of Florence — Anne Dempster Kyle: 1933
- Araminta — Eva Knox Evans: 1935
- Jerome Anthony — Eva Knox Evans: 1936
- The Polynesian Triangle — Eleanor Weakley Nolen: 1938
- Key Corner — Eva Knox Evans: 1938
- The Pilgrim Goose — Keith Robertson: 1956

=== As editor ===
- Song of the Pines — Walter and Marion Havighurst: 1949
