= Rhoda Power =

English broadcaster and children's writer 1890–1957

Rhoda Dolores Le Poer Power
- Born: May 29, 1890; Altrincham, Cheshire, England
- Died: March 9, 1957 (aged 66); London, England
- Education: University of St Andrews
- Writing career
- Genre: Historical fiction

Rhoda Dolores Le Poer Power (29 May 1890 in Altrincham, Cheshire – 9 March 1957 in London), was a pioneer English broadcaster and children's writer. The highly regarded set of stories that make up Redcap Runs Away (1952) are set in the Middle Ages and told by a runaway minstrel boy.

== Life and career ==
The daughter of Philip Ernest Le Poer Power (born 1860), a stockbroker, and Mabel Grindley, née Clegg (1866–1903), Rhoda Power and her sisters Eileen (1889–1940), who became a historian, and Beryl (1891–1974), who joined the civil service, were raised by their maternal grandfather and three aunts, after their father was convicted of fraud in 1891 and he went to prison for five years. She never saw him again and he went to prison again in 1905. Her mother died in 1903. Rhoda Power attended Oxford High School, run by the Girls' Public Day School Trust. She then read modern languages, economics and political economy at St. Andrews University in Scotland (1911–1913).

After a year in the United States, Power worked as a freelance journalist in several European countries. In 1917, she became governess to the daughter of a business family in Rostov-on-Don, Russia, where she became caught up in the October Revolution. An illness she caught there may have triggered the progressive deafness from which she began to suffer.

Power started to write history books for children in the 1920s, with her sister Eileen and later independently. In 1927 she began a career as a broadcaster with the BBC. She moved with the school broadcasting department to Bristol in 1939 and worked there for the rest of her life, apart from a year spent travelling in the Americas in 1946–1947. In 1950 she was awarded an MBE for her work.

== Redcap Runs Away ==
Power's book of stories Redcap Runs Away, illustrated by C. Walter Hodges, has become a children's classic, although one in danger of being forgotten today. It tells the story of a 10-year-old boy who takes up with a band of minstrels in the 14th century. As an anonymous reviewer in the Melbourne newspaper The Age put it in 1957, Redcap's adventures make "a peg on which to hang the stories the people used to hear in the market places and inns 600 years ago.... Miss Power has collected them from authentic sources and they still make very good reading."

The book joined the prominent UK Puffin Story Books list in that year, as a selection of Eleanor Graham, the senior series editor. Writing in the Puffin fan magazine Junior Bookshelf for 1952–1953, Graham wrote, "I have only praise and the highest praise" for the book, which "stands head and shoulders above its contemporaries." It was "a story which, if I am not mistaken, will set a new standard for us in children's stories." Among addicts were the historians John and Philip Sugden, who described the book as a childhood favorite.

The delineation of the characters and plot drew upon Rhoda's experience in schools' broadcasting, in which her forte was the dramatization of history for younger listeners. Her grasp of the social history of medieval England owes much to her older sister, the historian Eileen Power, who before her early death in 1940 had collaborated with Rhoda in preparing scripts for broadcasting on the BBC. Among these had been a story about life in a medieval village, told from the standpoint of Simon, a serf who had fled from a nearby manor. This story may have suggested the framework for Redcap Runs Away. However, English literary concern with minstrelsy has been continual since the Romantic period: poems such as Sir Walter Scott's The Lay of the Last Minstrel (1805) and John Clare's The Village Minstrel (1821), and novels like Helen Craik's Henry of Northumberland (1800), Sydney Owenson's The Novice of St. Dominick (a girl flees disguised as a minstrel, 1805), and more recently, Christabel Rose Coleridge's Minstrel Dick (a boy minstrel becomes a courtier, 1891) and Howard Spring's Darkie and Co. (a boy runs away from an unhappy home to join a travelling show, 1932).

The inclusion of so many minstrel stories in Redcap adds to the book's authenticity, but not all US critics at the time viewed this favourably. Commenting on the 1954 US edition, The Bulletin of the Children's Book Center wrote that "because of the many stories which have been included (one to each chapter) the plot moves slowly, and reading is further hampered by the extremely poor format, with its small type, crowded lines, and poor paper."

== Partial bibliography ==
- Under Cossack and Bolshevik, London : Methuen & Co. Ltd., 1919; US title: Under the Bolshevik Reign of Terror; In the storm : caught in the chaos of the Russian Revolution 1917-18, London : Marble Hill Publishers, 2025, ISBN ISBN 978-1-0683608-5-5
- Union Jack Saints. Legends Collected and Rewritten, 1920
- Boys and Girls of History, 1926, with Eileen Power. ISBN 0-234-77093-7
- Twenty Centuries of Travel. A Simple Survey of British History, 1926, with Eileen Power.
- Cities and Their Stories. An Introduction to the Study of European History, 1927, with Eileen Power
- The Age of Discovery from Marco Polo to Henry Hudson, 1927
- More Boys and Girls of History, 1928, with Eileen Power. ISBN 0-224-00503-0
- How It Happened. Myths and Folk-Tales, 1930
- Richard the Lionheart and the Third Crusade, 1931
- Stories from Everywhere, 1931. ISBN 0-234-77180-1
- Great People of the Past, 1932
- The Kingsway Histories for Juniors, 4 volumes, 1937-9
- Ten Minute Tales and Dialogue Stories, 1943
- The American Twins of the Revolution, 1943
- The Chinese Twins, 1944
- The Big Book of Stories from Many Lands
- Seven Minute Tales. ISBN 0-237-35135-8
- Tales for the Telling. ISBN 0-237-44813-0
- Here and There Stories, 1945
- The Indian Twins, pre-1950
- The Filipino Twins, 1949
- Redcap Runs Away, children's historical novel, 1952. ISBN 0-224-00503-0
- The Spanish Twins, 1954
- We Were There, imaginary eye-witness accounts of historical events, 1955
- The French Twins, 1955
- We Too Were There. More Stories from History, 1956
- From the Fury of the Northmen: and Other Stories That Shaped Our Destiny in 18th to 19th Century England, 1957

Several other books in the "Twins" series of introductions to foreign countries were written by others and introduced by Rhoda Power.
