= Marion Boyd (disambiguation) =

Marion Boyd may refer to:

- Marion Boyd (1946–2022), Canadian politician
- Marion Speed Boyd (1900–1988), U.S. federal judge
- Marion Boyd (mistress), mistress of James IV of Scotland
- Marion Boyd (writer) (1894–1974), American writer and poet
