= Franz Tieze =

Irish forger (1842–1932)

Franz Tieze (1842–1932) was a late 19th-century Dublin-based forger. An exiled Bohemian glass engraver, he worked in Dublin in the studios of the Pugh Brothers (Thomas and Richard Pugh) at The Potters Alley Glass Works, the only manufacturers of flint-glass in Ireland. Tieze had been recruited, with other Bohemian glass engravers, by the Pugh Brothers, and he arrived in Dublin in 1865 to engrave glass in the 'antique style'.

Cork historian Robert Day and Franz Tieze collaborated in supplying goblets to a ready market of glass collectors. Day researched Irish Volunteer glass designs and Jacobite toasting glasses. Tieze's engraving skills allowed the work to be categorised as "historicist". Thomas Rohan, in his Confessions of a Dealer (London, 1924), noted the flood of Volunteer and Williamite glasses in Dublin. An example of Tieze's work is the Charlemont Jug, regarded as genuine until scrutinised firstly by Mary Boydell and then by Peter Francis, a modern Irish researcher who found compelling evidence in Tieze's own notebooks, showing that the age and style of the engraving had been faked, circa 1900. It was subsequently acquired by the National Museum of Ireland.

Francis' revelations appeared in the Burlington Magazine in 1994. It was disclosed that almost without exception, every single glass piece supposedly engraved in support of the Irish Volunteer regiments of the late 18th century was the work of Franz Tieze. The glass was from the period it purported to be, while the engraving was carried out much later.

While Tieze's ability to have produced 'period' glassware is undeniable, he did not profit substantially from his activities. Tieze was admitted to Simpson's Hospital in Dublin in 1910. Hospital records indicate that he spent his final 22 years there, and that he had been blind when admitted. This conflicts with evidence unearthed by Boydell and Francis, which shows that Tieze had been engraving pieces "after 1913 and possibly as late as 1918".

Initially, the researchers investigated only Williamite glass, which supposedly was made to celebrate the victory of William of Orange (1689–1702) over the Stuarts. It was found that much of this glass was 19th-century, and some the work of Tieze, who had supplied the pieces to Orange Order lodges. It was noticed that some of the individuals who had promoted Volunteer and Williamite glass had also featured in the promotion of Jacobite glass. Major museums in Ireland and England, including the Victoria & Albert and the Museum of London, took a closer look at their collections and re-attributed the offending items. It soon became evident that dealers, collectors, and museums had not been as scrupulous as they might have in checking the provenance of the 18th-century commemorative glass in their collections.

== Bibliography ==
- Franz Tieze 1842-1932 : a Bohemian glass-engraver in Dublin - Mary Boydell, 1992
- Franz Tieze (1842-1932) and the re-invention of history on glass - Peter Francis, 1994
- The engraved glass of Franz Tieze - Mary Boydell, 1995
