= The Apprentice of Florence =

Historical novel by Anne Dempster Kyle

- Author: Anne Dempster Kyle
- Illustrator: Erick Berry
- Genre: Children's historical novel
- Publisher: Houghton Mifflin Company
- Publication date: June 1, 1933
- Awards: Newbery Honor (1934)
- ISBN: 978-9-997-48924-1

The Apprentice of Florence is a children's historical novel by Anne Dempster Kyle set in 15th century Italy and Constantinople. It was published in 1933 and was a Newbery Honor recipient in 1934. The book is illustrated by Erick Berry.

The novel is set principally in 1453, the year when Constantinople fell to the besieging Turks. It follows the adventures of sixteen-year-old Nemo, apprenticed to a silk merchant of Florence, who accompanies the merchant's son to Constantinople on business.
