= Holiday at the Dew Drop Inn =

First edition (publ. Heinemann)

Holiday at the Dew Drop Inn is the third and final book in the series by Eve Garnett which began with the award-winning The Family from One End Street in 1937, and continued with the long-delayed Further Adventures of the Family from One End Street (published in 1956). It describes Kate Ruggles' summer holiday at the Dew Drop Inn in the fictional village of Upper Cassington. It is stated in More Adventures of the Family From One End Street that the village is in Kent. It was first published by Heinemann (publisher) in 1962, and first appeared in Puffin Books in 1966.
