= Robert Day (antiquarian) =

Irish antiquarian & photographer (1836–1914)

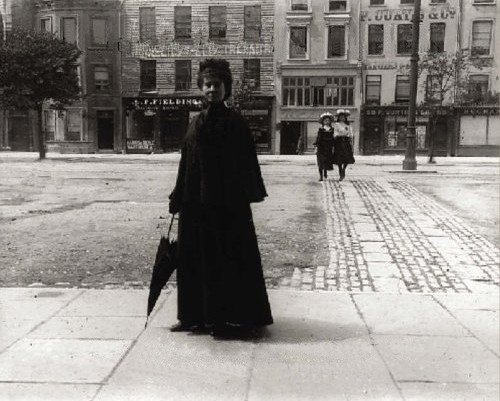
"City of Cork" by Robert Day

Robert Day (1836–1914) was an Irish antiquarian and photographer who collaborated with Franz Tieze in producing imitation Williamite, Jacobite and Irish Volunteer glassware.

== Biography ==
Day was an important and well-travelled antiquarian collector. He was involved in his family's extensive saddlery business together with a sports shop well known to Cork anglers. His wife Rebecca belonged to the Scott family who had an extensive ironmongery business in King Street (now McCurtain Street). They lived at Myrtle Hill outside Cork until 1906 and after at Patrick's Hill.

He was president of the Cork Cuverian Society and its successor the Cork Historical and Archaeological Society from 1894 to 1914. There, he gathered an enormous collection of Irish archaeological artefacts which were auctioned in 1915 and turned up in the collections of John Hunt in Limerick and Walter J. Verschoyle-Campbell, as well as the Birmingham Archaeological Society, the Louth Archaeological Society, the Ulster Museum and the National Museum of Ireland. An ongoing project at the Archaeology Department University College Cork is seeking to trace items from this auction.

His early photographs date from the 1860s and continue until his death. They are atmospheric and depict a Cork which in many ways has disappeared. The pictures are now part of the Day collection which also has photographs by his son William ('Willy')Tottenham Day 1874-1965 and grandson Alec 1902-1980. Another grandson was the noted writer and wood engraver Robert Gibbings.

His daughter was the playwright and novelist Suzanne R. Day. His grandson was Canadian art director Richard Day.
