= The Winged Girl of Knossos =

1933 children's novel by Erick Berry

- Author: Erick Berry
- Illustrator: Erick Berry
- Language: English
- Genre: Children's literature
- Publisher: Appleton
- Publication date: 1932
- Publication place: United States

The Winged Girl of Knossos is a 1932 children's fantasy novel written and illustrated by Erick Berry. Set in Bronze Age Crete, it is based on Greek mythology, Cretan history, and archaeological findings. The central character is Inas, the daughter of the inventor Daidalos. Berry received a Newbery Honor for the book in 1933.
