= The Family from One End Street =

1937 children's novel by Eve Garnett

- First edition
- Author: Eve Garnett
- Illustrator: Eve Garnett
- Language: English
- Series: One End Street
- Genre: Children's realist novel
- Publisher: Frederick Muller
- Publication date: 1937
- Publication place: United Kingdom
- Media type: Print
- Pages: 212 pp (first edition)
- OCLC: 153872836
- LC Class: PZ7.G1843 Fam
- Followed by: Further Adventures of the Family from One End Street

The Family from One End Street is a realistic English children's novel, written and illustrated by Eve Garnett and published by Frederick Muller in 1937. It is "a classic story of life in a big, happy family." set in a small Sussex town in the south east of England. It was regarded as innovative and groundbreaking for its portrayal of a working-class family at a time when children's books were dominated by stories about middle-class children.

In 1938, Garnett won the second annual Carnegie Medal awarded by the Library Association for The Family from One End Street, recognising the best children's book by a British subject for the previous year. On the 70th anniversary of the Medal it was named one of the top ten winning works of the previous seventy years, selected by a panel from a public ballot to propose the all-time favourite.

By the 1960s, some critics viewed the novel as patronizing toward the working class. Author Rosemary Manning captured this sentiment in 1966, describing the book as merely a "perfunctory glance from outside."

It is regarded as a classic, and remains in print, most recently reissued as a Puffin Classic in 2014.

There were two sequels, Further Adventures of the Family from One End Street published in 1956 and Holiday at the Dew Drop Inn published in 1962 and subtitled "A One End Street story" in the United States.

Collectively, the three novels are referred to as the "One End Street" series.

== Setting ==
The Ruggles family lives at No. 1 One End Street in the heart of Otwell, located on the Ouse river. Otwell-on-the-Ouse is a fictional town resembling Lewes, Sussex, where the author lived.

Josiah Ruggles works for Otwell council as a dustman and his wife Rosie takes in washing. They have seven children, so life is hard, but they are a happy family.

CILIP, successor to the Library Association, assigns the subject tags "family large roisterous" and "family working class" in its online presentation of the Carnegie Medal winning books.

== Plot ==
The story begins with Lily Rose, the eldest child, trying to help her mother Rosie with the ironing and ruining a green petticoat. She apologises to its owner, Mrs Beaseley, who forgives her. Mrs Beaseley also gives Kate (the second eldest child) her niece's cast off clothes for her new school, as the government funds to help with this are paid in arrears. Kate loses the school hat, and tries to sell mushrooms to pay for a new one, but the original is eventually found.

Jim, the older and more ambitious of the Ruggles twins, meets and joins the local gang, the Black Hands, led by a twelve-year-old named Henry Oates. Though they consider him too young to join and accuse him of spying, Jim begs to be accepted.

The next Saturday, as a hailstorm begins, Jim follows a dog into a drain pipe around a wharf's barge-loading area for shelter. Once the pipe is loaded on the barge Jim climbs aboard, hides in the pipe and is carried down the river to the seaport Salthaven. He is still in the pipe when it is loaded directly from the barge into a waiting ship. A man on the ship angrily returns him to the land, and the surrounding dock workers help him to get home.

John, the younger twin, is a car fan and regularly visits Otwell Castle's car park. A wealthy couple called the Lawrences arrive at the castle, and allow him to "mind" their car. The same hailstorm which sends Jim into the pipe on the wharf for shelter catches John, and he climbs into the car for shelter. When the Lawrences return, they drive away without checking the back seat, and John does not awaken until they have driven some miles. Instead of turning around and taking him home, they invite him to their son's birthday party, and send a telegram to John's family to let them know that he is safe.

William, the youngest Ruggles child, is entered in the Annual Baby Show, but the family is concerned as he is a late teether. He wins his age category (6–12 months) but an older competitor wins the Grand Challenge Cup as William has no teeth. The Ruggles return home only to find that William now has a tooth.

Jo Ruggles junior, the fifth child, a Mickey Mouse fan, enjoys watching cartoons at the cinema. On Saturday morning he sneaks inside the empty building and hides in the orchestra pit to see the first colour Mickey Mouse film, where he soon falls asleep; several hours later, several cinema musicians find him. Jo explains why he sneaked in, and the men give him sixpence for the show, and a warning not to do it again.

Mr Ruggles receives a reward of £2 for returning some lost money, which he uses to take his family to the Cart Horse Parade in London's Regent's Park, where Mr Ruggles' brother has entered his horse in the competition. The horse, Bernard Shaw, takes first place, and the families climb into the cart to participate in the parade. The Ruggles spend the afternoon at a "posh" tea shop, nearly missing their train home in the excitement.

== Publication history ==
Eve Garnett wrote that The Family From One End Street was rejected as unsuitable by at least eight other publishers before being taken by Muller.

The US Library of Congress gives a longer title, The Family from One End street and some of their adventures, for its oldest holding, a 1939 UK edition.

Recent British editions have been published by Puffin. The Family first appeared as a Puffin Book in 1942, under the editorship of Eleanor Graham, only a year after Penguin Books introduced the imprint.

- ISBN 0-14-030007-4 (Puffin, UK, late 1980s reprint)

== See also ==
Awards
Preceded by Pigeon Post	Carnegie Medal recipient 1937	Succeeded by The Circus Is Coming
