= Beryl Power =

- Born: Beryl Millicent Le Poer Power; September 17, 1891; Dunham Massey
- Died: November 4, 1974 (aged 83); Kensington
- Education: Oxford High School
- Occupation: civil servant
- Employer: United Nations Relief and Rehabilitation Administration

Beryl Millicent Le Poer Power (September 17, 1891 – November 4, 1974) was a British civil servant. She ran a number of programmes during the second world war and worked in China for the United Nations Relief and Rehabilitation Administration after the war.

== Life ==
Power was born in Dunham Massey in 1891. She was the daughter of Philip Ernest Le Poer Power (born 1860), a stockbroker, and Mabel Grindley, née Clegg (1866–1903). Her elder sister was the broadcaster Rhoda Power and her eldest sister was Eileen Power who became a notable historian. The three sisters were raised by their maternal grandfather and their aunts, after their father was convicted of fraud in 1891 and he went to prison for five years. She never saw him again and he went to prison again in 1905. Her mother died in 1903. Beryl Power attended Bournemouth Church High School, Bournemouth high school and Oxford High School which was run by the Girls' Public Day School Trust. She went to Cambridge in 1910 to begin a history degree at Girton College. When she left Girton she devoted her time to the National Union of Women's Suffrage Societies becoming a speaker and an organiser of their non-militant protests. This work ended in 1914 when many suffragists and suffragettes stopped their activism for the duration of the war.

In 1909 the government had passed the first of the Trade Boards Acts which established minimum wages in a number of trades. Power was employed as a (third class) inspector in 1915 by the Board of Trade as she was tasked with enforcing this unpopular legislation. As a woman she was only investigating the jobs of women but women were employed in several types of sweated labour. She found her training as a suffragist dealing with unpopular ideas as useful training and by 1920 she had risen to be a deputy chief inspector in the Ministry of Labour.

In 1925 her promise was recognised when she was funded by the Laura Spelman Rockefeller Memorial fund to travel to America. She was tasked with looking at the working conditions of women and children although there was no requirement to create a report. However she did create reports for her superiors, but she resisted their publication as she did not want to reveal the severity of some of her comments about her American hosts.

In 1938 she was in a key position where she was organising the list of thousands of people who might have skills that may be useful to the government. When war was declared in 1939 this list became of critical importance. The Central Register for Persons with Scientific, Technical, Professional and Higher Administrative Qualifications identified scientists who could be used for war work. The names on the list were proposed by universities and the Royal Society. Many could remember that in the first world war some very clever scientists were lost on the front when they had more important skills to be exploited. This new list helped avoid that mistake being repeated. The following year she was organising the emigration of children to avoid enemy bombing but this was halted when a ship carrying 70 children was torpedoed and lost at sea in September 1940.

In 1945 she went to work for the United Nations Relief and Rehabilitation Administration in China. She was very successful and it was requested that she stay there until 1949.

She retired in 1951.

Power died in Kensington in 1974 after writing her own death notice for The Times. She died after taking a poisonous amount of alcohol and barbiturates. She left instructions that her death should not be announced until after her private cremation.
