= Viola Bayley =

British children's writer

- Born: Viola Clare Wingfield Powles; 8 January 1911; Rye, England
- Died: 11 January 1997 (aged 86); Rye, England
- Citizenship: British
- Occupations: Novelist, teacher
- Writing career
- Language: English
- Genres: Adventure, Mystery, Fantasy
- Subject: Children's literature

Viola Clare Bayley (8 January 1911 – 11 January 1997) was a British children's writer of adventure stories.

== Life ==
Viola Clare Wingfield Powles was born on 8 January 1911, in Rye, Sussex. Her parents were Isabel Grace Wingfield and Lewis Charles Powles. She was educated at Effingham House, Behnke Drama School, and Licenciate of the Guildhall School of Music.

In the winter of 1933 she visited her uncle, a high Court Judge, in Lahore in India. There she met Vernon Thomas Bayley (C.M.G., O.B.E.) of the Indian Police and got engaged. She returned to England to be married and subsequently returned to Hangu in India with her husband in 1934. In 1935 they moved to Delhi. Over the years frequent trips to places such as Simla and Gulmarg took place. After the war, they returned to England in 1946.

The couple has two sons, two daughters.

1975/76: short memoir of the first year in India, and One Woman's Raj about her time in India .

Death: 11 January 1997

== Works ==
- The Wings of the Morning. Tales (1936)*
- The Ways of Wonderland (1938)
- The Dark Lantern (1951)
- White Holiday (1953)*. On holiday in Switzerland, Rosamund and her brother help their skiing instructor to uncover a mystery which threatens his life
- Storm on the Marsh (1953)
- April Gold (1954)
- Paris Adventure (1954)
- Little Mallows (1955)
- Lebanon Adventure (1955)
- Kashmir Adventure (1956)
- Turkish Adventure (1957)
- Corsican Adventure (1957)
- Shadow on the Wall (1958)
- Swedish Adventure (1959)
- Mission on the Moor (1960)*
- London Adventure (1962)
- Italian Adventure (1964)
- Scottish Adventure (1965)
- Welsh Adventure (1966)
- Austrian Adventure (1968)*
- Jersey Adventure (1969)
- Adriatic Adventure (1970)*
- Caribbean Adventure (1971)*. Tricia and her friends the Hamilton's go to stay with their cousin Derek who has inherited an estate on the island of Grenada.
- Greek Adventure (1972)
- Shadows on the Cape (1985)*

* date of first edition. Other dates of first edition not verified

Shorter stories in collections:

"Turn of the Tide" in Collins Girl's Annual 1955
"Walls of Snow" in Collins Girl's Annual (1953 ?) 128 pages
... in Stirring Stories for Girls, 1960, Duthie, Eric. Editor
... in The Favourite Book for Girls
... in Girls' Story Omnibus
"Walls of Snow" in The Splendid Book for Girls (about 1956)

A number of these works were illustrated by Marcia Lane Foster

== Other languages ==
A number of her works were translated into other languages

=== German ===
- Die Schwarze Laterne (The Dark Lantern)
- Abenteuer in Paris (Paris Adventure)
- So tüchtig wie Tissie or Eine Überraschung jagt die andere (Little Mallows)
- Abenteuer im Libanon (Lebanon Adventure)
- Abenteuer in Kaschmir (Kashmir Adventure)
- Schatten über Penderwick (Shadow on the Wall)
- Abenteuer in Italien (Italian Adventure)
- Abenteuer in Schottland (Scottish Adventure)
- Abenteuer in Wales (Welsh Adventure)
- Abenteuer auf Jersey (Jersey Adventure)
- Karibisches Abenteuer (Caribbean Adventure)
- Abenteuer in Griechenland (Greek Adventure)
- Flammen über dem Tafelberg (Shadows on the Cape)

=== French ===
- Une ombre sur le mur (Shadow on the Wall)
- Aventure aux Caraïbes (Caribbean Adventure)
- Au-dessus du gouffre in 15 histoires d'aventure pour Filles

=== Dutch ===
- De schaduw op de muur (Shadow on the Wall)
- Het raadsel van het heidehuis (Mission on the Moor)

=== Swedish ===
- Äventyr i Paris (Paris Adventure)

== Sources ==
- Bayley, Viola (1975–76), One Woman's Raj., (134 pp.) Unpublished memoir of life in India, 1933-46. Bayley (V) Papers. CSAS (Centre of South Asian Studies, U of Cambridge), archived from the original on 16 April 2015
- Legg, Stephen (2007). Spaces of colonialism: Delhi's urban governmentalities. Malden, Massachusetts: Blackwell Publishing. ISBN 9781405156332.
- Collingham, Elizabeth M. (2006). Curry: a tale of cooks and conquerors. London: Vintage. ISBN 9780099437864.
- Procida, Mary (2002), "Re-writing the mutiny", in Procida, Mary (ed.), Married to the empire: gender, politics and imperialism in India, 1883-1947, Manchester England New York New York: Manchester University Press Distributed exclusively in the USA by Palgrave, p. 131, ISBN 9780719060731.
- Gowans, Georgina (January–February 2006). "Travelling home: British women sailing from India, 1940–1947". Women's Studies International Forum. 29 (1): 81–95. doi:10.1016/j.wsif.2005.10.008.
- Thatcher, Mary (2008), "Viola Bayley", in Thatcher, Mary (ed.), Respected Memsahibs: an anthology, Aylesbeare, Devon: Hardinge Simpole, pp. 225–237, OCLC 319534828. ISBN 978-1-84382-214-1 Introduction by Sir Christopher Bayly
