= The Radium Woman =

1939 biography by Eleanor Doorly

- Cover of the first edition
- Author: Eleanor Doorly
- Illustrator: Robert Gibbings
- Cover artist: Gibbings
- Language: English
- Subject: Marie Curie
- Genre: Biography for children
- Publisher: Heinemann
- Publication date: 1939
- Publication place: United Kingdom
- Media type: Print (hardcover)
- Pages: 181 pp (first edition)
- ISBN: 0435120077 (1970?)
- OCLC: 558179914
- LC Class: QD22.C8 D6 1940

The Radium Woman: A youth edition of the life of Madame Curie is a biography of the scientist Marie Curie adapted for children by Eleanor Doorly from the 1937 biography by Ève Curie. It was published by Heinemann in 1939 with woodcuts by Robert Gibbings as chapter headings.

Doorly and The Radium Woman won the fourth annual Carnegie Medal from the Library Association, recognising the year's best children's book by a British subject. Only a handful of nonfiction books have been so honoured.

Hesperides Press republished the biography in 2006.

== Origin ==
The Radium Woman was based on Ève Curie's biography of her mother, which had been simultaneously published in France, Britain, Italy, Spain, the United States and other countries in 1937. Doorly explained in the foreword:

"The life of Madame Curie has been written by her daughter with a charm and beauty never surpassed. It is therefore with the deepest humility that I have ventured to make out of that lovely book a shorter tale for young people. People ought not to wait till they are over sixteen to make the acquaintance of the greatest and most delightful human beings and to hear of the world's greatest deeds."

== Contents ==
The first seven chapters concern Marie Curie's early life, which was spent in a Poland unwillingly incorporated into the Russian Empire. The book begins with the five-year-old Manya Sklodovski in her family home in Warsaw, already aware of the power of the Russian officials, and later describes the ten-year-old schoolgirl's experience of secretly learning forbidden Polish history with her class. Her surroundings and the incidents of her life are vividly described and her early brilliance unforcedly exhibited. Other chapters concern the fourteen-year-old Manya learning that a friend's brother is to be executed as a rebel, and her year's holiday after finishing High School at sixteen, time spent in the country and the mountains.

The biography continues through the early difficult days of making a living by teaching, supporting her sister who was studying medicine in Paris, starting an illegal Polish school for peasant children in the country, and an unhappy love affair. Then after a brief sojourn in Belgium come her own days of study both in Paris and in Warsaw. "That was the part of Marie's life she loved best, her hard student days, when, working in poverty and alone, with all the power of her youth, she was most herself."

Her meeting with Pierre Curie which led to marriage and the flowering of her career, and the great discoveries which changed the face of science and earned the Nobel Prize, occupy the central chapters of the book. At each step the text is peppered with descriptions of her daily life and small significant incidents to make the story come alive for the young reader.

== Carnegie Medal ==
According to one history of the Library Association Carnegie Medal, the committee decided to make no 1939 award, early in 1940, affected both by recent criticism and by the coming of war. The award to Doorly and The Radium Woman was made over the heads of the committee.

== See also ==
Awards
Preceded by The Circus Is Coming	Carnegie Medal recipient 1939	Succeeded by Visitors from London
