= Ian Serraillier =

English novelist and poet (1912–1994)

Ian Serraillier (24 September 1912 – 28 November 1994) was an English novelist and poet. He retold legends from England, Greece and Rome and was best known for his children's books, especially The Silver Sword (1956), a wartime adventure story that the BBC adapted for television in 1957 and again in 1971.

== Early life and education ==
Serraillier, born in London on 24 September 1912, was the eldest of the four children of Lucien Serraillier (1886–1919) and Mary Kirkland Rodger (1883–1940). His father died in the 1918 Spanish flu pandemic.

Serraillier was educated at Brighton College, a public school, and at St Edmund Hall, Oxford. He then taught English at Wycliffe College, Gloucestershire in 1936–1939, Dudley Boys Grammar School, Worcestershire, in 1939–1946, and Midhurst Grammar School, West Sussex, in 1946–1961.

As a Quaker Serraillier was granted conscientious objector status in World War II, and served as an air raid warden during the conflict. He was a member of the pacifist Peace Pledge Union.

== Career ==
In 1946, Serraillier published his first three children's books: They Raced for Treasure, a story of sailing, treasure and spies, and Thomas and the Sparrow.

In 1948, he and his wife, Anne Margaret Rogers, founded the New Windmill Series for Heinemann Educational Books, to provide inexpensive editions of worthwhile fiction, travel and biography for older readers. He continued to co-edit the series until the early 1990s.

He wrote more adventure stories, including his best-known one, The Silver Sword (1956), which follows the story of four refugee children, three of them siblings: Ruth, Edek, and Bronia. The fourth, Jan, is another of the many Warsaw war orphans, and has somehow met their father. The four children search for the siblings' parents in the chaos of Europe just after the Second World War. The book appeared in the United States under the title Escape from Warsaw.

The Ivory Horn (1960), a retelling of the Roland legend, was a runner-up for the Carnegie Medal, as had been The Silver Sword.

From 1961, Serraillier spent most of his time writing fiction and non-fiction, poems, and educational programmes for television. He also retold classic and ancient legends for children, in prose and verse, including Beowulf, works by Chaucer, English folklore, and Greek and Roman myths.

As a popular children's author, Serraillier was invited to Children's Literature Summer Camps for members of the Puffin Book Club, run by Colony Holidays (predecessor to ATE Superweeks), along with other popular children's authors such as Joan Aiken and Clive King.

=== Later life ===
Serraillier and his wife lived and worked in an old flint cottage at Singleton near Chichester, in West Sussex. He was diagnosed with Alzheimer's disease in the early 1990s, and the illness contributed to his death on 28 November 1994, at the age of 82. He had three daughters and a son.

== Papers ==
The Papers of Ian Serraillier held at the University of Reading largely comprise manuscripts, typescripts, and galley proofs, including Fight for Freedom, The Clashing Rocks, The Cave of Death, Havelock the Dane, They Raced for Treasure, Flight to Adventure, and The Silver Sword. They also contain correspondence with publishers, other business and literary correspondence, notebooks with poems, ideas and story outlines, rejection letters, publishers' agreements, press cuttings, research material, lecture notes and typescripts, obituaries, etc.

== Bibliography ==
=== Poetry ===
- Three New Poets: Roy McFadden, Alex Comfort, Ian Serraillier (1942, Grey Walls Press)
- The Weaver Birds (1944, Macmillan) — illustrated by Serraillier
- Thomas and the Sparrow (1946, Oxford University Press)
- The Monster Horse (1950, Oxford University Press)
- The Ballad of Kon-Tiki and Other Verses (1952, Oxford University Press)
- Everest Climbed (1955, Oxford University Press)
- Poems and Pictures (1958, Heinemann)
- A Puffin Quartet of Poets: Eleanor Farjeon, James Reeves, E. V. Rieu, Ian Serraillier (1958, Penguin) — edited by Eleanor Graham
- The Windmill Book of Ballads: Beowulf the Warrior and Other Poems (1962, Heinemann)
- I'll Tell You a Tale: A Collection of Poems and Ballads (1973, Longman) — illustrated by Charles Keeping and Renate Meyer
- How Happily She Laughs and Other Poems (1976, Longman)
- The Visitor

=== Fiction ===
- They Raced for Treasure (1946, Cape) — later issued in a "simplified education edition" as Treasure Ahead (1954, Heinemann)
- Flight to Adventure (1947, Cape) — later issued in a "simplified education edition" as Mountain Rescue (1955, Heinemann)
- Captain Bounsaboard and the Pirates (1949, Cape)
- There’s No Escape (1950, Cape) — later issued in an "education edition" (1952, Heinemann)
- Belinda and the Swans (1952, Cape)
- Jungle Adventure (1953, Heinemann) — based on story by R. M. Ballantyne
- The Adventures of Dick Varley (1954, Heinemann) — based on a story by R. M. Ballantyne
- Making Good (1955, Heinemann)
- The Silver Sword (1956, Cape) — also published as Escape from Warsaw (1963, Scholastic), and as an "educational edition" (1957, Heinemann)
- Guns in the Wild (1956, Heinemann) — based on a story by R. M. Ballantyne
- Katy at Home (1957, Heinemann) — based on a story by Susan Coolidge
- Katy at School (1959, Heinemann) — based on a story by Susan Coolidge
- The Ivory Horn (1960, Oxford University Press) — adaptation of The Song of Roland
- The Gorgon’s Head: The Story of Perseus (1961, Oxford University Press)
- The Way of Danger: The Story of Theseus (1962, Oxford University Press)
- Happily Ever After (1963, Oxford University Press)
- The Clashing Rocks: The Story of Jason (1963, Oxford University Press)
- The Midnight Thief: A Musical Story (1963, BBC Publications) — music by Richard Rodney Bennett, illustrations by Tellosa
- The Enchanted Island: Stories from Shakespeare (1964, Walck) — republished in an "education edition" as Murder at Dunsinane (1967, Scholastic)
- The Cave of Death (1965, Heinemann)
- Fight for Freedom (1965, Heinemann)
- Ahmet the Woodseller: A Musical Story (1965, Oxford University Press) — music by Gordon Crosse, illustrations by John Griffiths
- A Fall from the Sky: The Story of Daedalus (1966, Nelson)
- The Challenge of the Green Knight (1966, Oxford University Press)
- Robin in the Greenwood (1967, Oxford University Press)
- The Turtle Drum: A Musical Story (1967, BBC Publications) — music by Malcolm Arnold, illustrated by Charles Pickard
- Havelock the Dane (1967, Walck) — published in the UK as Havelock the Warrior (1968, Hamish Hamilton)
- Robin and His Merry Men (1969, Oxford University Press)
- The Tale of Three Landlubbers (1970, Hamish Hamilton) — illustrated by Raymond Briggs
- Heracles the Strong (1970, Walck)
- The Ballad of St Simeon (1970, Walck)
- A Pride of Lions: A Musical Story (1971, Oxford University Press) — music by Phyllis Tate
- The Bishop and the Devil (1971, Kaye and Ward)
- Have You Got Your Ticket? (1972, Longman)
- Marko’s Wedding (1972, Deutsch)
- The Franklin’s Tale, Retold (1972, Warne)
- Suppose You Met a Witch (1973, Little, Brown)
- The Robin and the Wren (1974, Longman)
- The Road to Canterbury (1979, Kestrel Books)

=== Non-fiction ===
- Chaucer and His World (1967, Lutterworth)
- All Change at Singleton: For Charlton, Goodwood, East and West Dean (1979, Phillimore) — local history
- Goodwood Country in Old Photographs (1987, Sutton) — with Richard Pailthorpe

=== Translations ===
- Florina and the Wild Bird by Selina Choenz (1952, Oxford University Press) — co-translated with his wife, Anne Serraillier
- Beowulf the Warrior (1954, Oxford University Press)

=== As editor ===
- Wide Horizon Reading Scheme (1953–1955, Heinemann) 4 volumes – edited, with Ronald Ridout
