= Lewis Charles Powles =

British artist (1860–1942)

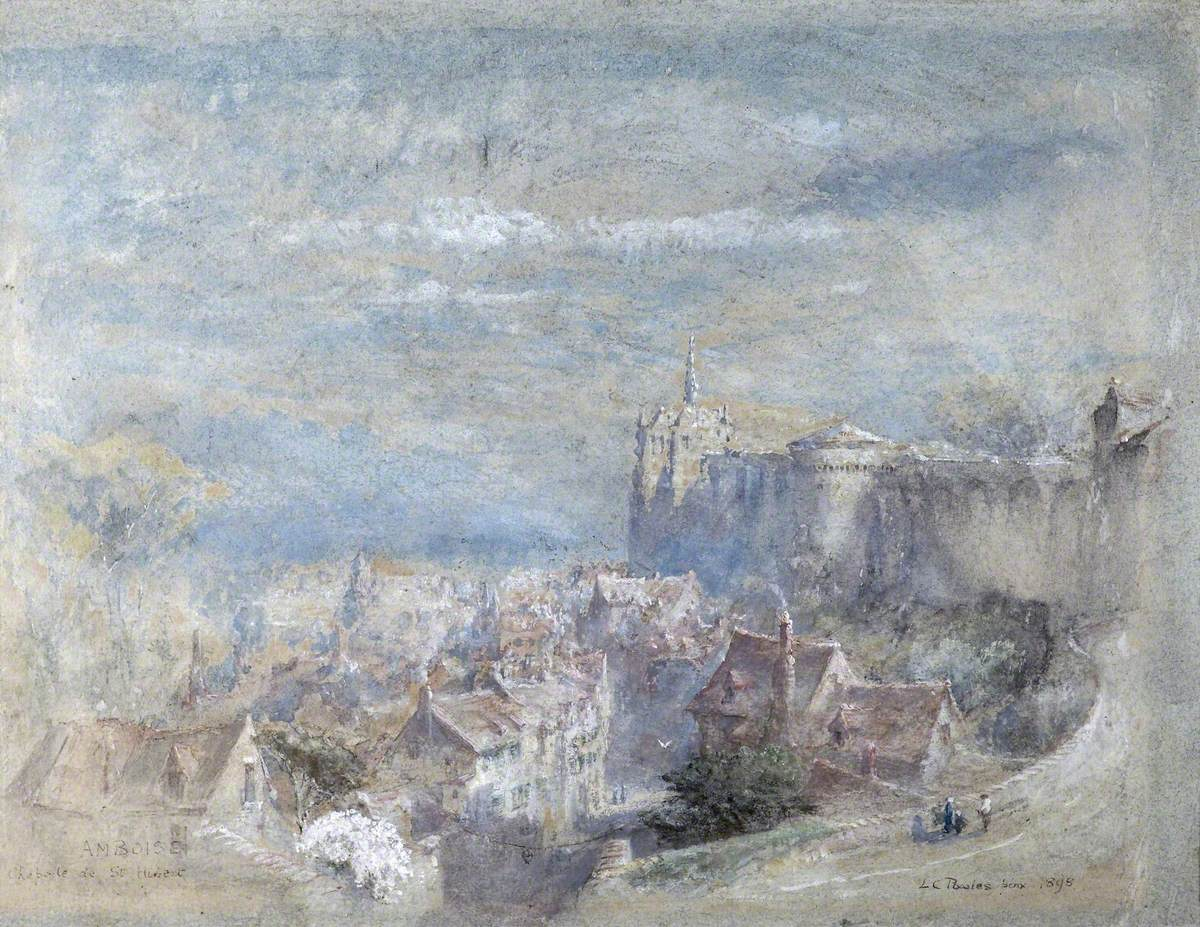
- Chapelle Saint-Hubert by Lewis Charles Powles (1898)
- Born: January 29, 1860; Cirencester, England
- Died: July 6, 1942 (aged 82); East Sussex
- Education: Hubert von Herkomer followed by further studies in Munich.

Lewis Charles Powles (29 January 1860 – 6 July 1942) was a British artist.

== Early life and education ==
Powles was born in Cirencester, England, in January 1860, one of six children. His father was Rev. Henry C. Powles. Powles attended Oxford, where he studied Mathematics under Charles Lutwidge Dodgson, better known as Lewis Carroll, author of Alice in Wonderland. Powles gained his MA from there in 1898. Powles had formal art studies under Hubert von Herkomer, followed by studies in Munich.

== Career ==
Powles was elected a member of the Royal Society of British Artists in 1903. Powles travelled extensively throughout Europe, as well as to Canada. His works are in the Bushey Museum and Art Gallery, the Ferens Art Gallery, the National Trust, Lamb House, the Royal Welch Fusiliers Regimental Museum, the Victoria & Albert Museum, and the Royal Collection Trust. Powles is most well known for his watercolour landscapes, although he painted a number of oil portraits. Two of his watercolours were commissioned for the Library in Queen Mary's Doll House. In 1910, he painted English writer Henry James, who was Powles' neighbour and friend in Rye. Powles was also an Associate Member of the Society for Psychical Research, and was very interested in paranormal events. In a letter, he once said that he was "somewhat easily impressed by the thoughts of others".

== Personal life ==
He married Isabel Grace Wingfield on 21 January 1905. Their daughter, writer Viola Bayley, was born in 1911. Powles died in East Sussex in 1942.
