= Marcia Lane Foster =

British artist (1897-1983)

- Born: Nellie Marcia Lane Foster; 1897; Seaton, Devon, England
- Died: 1983 (aged 85–86); Wincanton, Somerset
- Education: St John's Wood School of Art; Royal Academy Schools; Central School of Arts and Crafts
- Known for: Painting, book illustration
- Spouse(s): Howard Dudley Jarrett, m.1925-1980, his death

Nellie Marcia Lane Foster later Marcia Jarrett, (1897–1983), was a British artist notable as a printmaker, portrait painter and book illustrator.

== Biography ==
Foster was born at Seaton in Devon but raised in Manchester before she moved to London. There she studied at the St John's Wood School of Art then at the Royal Academy Schools before enrolling at the Central School of Arts and Crafts where she was taught printmaking by Noel Rooke. At the Central School she was awarded a silver medal for figure painting in 1921.

After graduating Foster created a career that combined portrait painting with illustrating books and the production of advertising material. For almost twenty years Foster designed promotional material for William Hollins & Co and their various brands which included Viyella and Clydella. She also created illustrations for Cadbury, Nestlé, Clarks Shoes, Kodak and other brand names. Throughout her career Foster illustrated several dozen books. For a 1923 edition of The Merrie Tales of Jacques Tournebroche by Anatole France she created a set of sixteen wood engravings that were acquired for the British Museum print collection while the Metropolitan Museum of Art in New York holds a set of her prints for Canadian Fairy Tales from 1922.

Foster exhibited paintings and drawings in group exhibitions throughout her career, notably at the Royal Academy in London between 1952 and 1964 and with the Society of Women Artists from 1923 to 1935. She also exhibited works with the New English Art Club, at the Paris Salon and at the Art Institute of Chicago. Foster was an elected member of the Arts and Crafts Exhibition Society and was an associate member of the Royal Society of Painter-Etchers and Engravers. Foster married the artist and writer Howard Dudley Jarrett in 1925 and died at Wincanton in Somerset.

== Selected books illustrated ==
- The Golden Journey of Mr Paradyne by William John Locke
- The Headswoman, 1921, by Kenneth Grahame
- Canadian Fairy Tales, c. 1922, by Cyrus Macmillan
- The Merrie Tales of Jacques Tournebroche, 1923. by Anatole France
- Little Sea Dogs and Other Tales, 1925, by Anatole France
- Lets Do It, 1938, by Marcia Lane Foster
- Dusty's Windmill, 1949, by Kitty Barne
- Paris Adventure, 1954, by Viola Bayley
- Scottish Adventure, 1965, by Viola Bayley
