= Further Adventures of the Family from One End Street =

Novel by Eve Garnett

First edition

Further Adventures of the Family from One End Street is an English children's book by Eve Garnett which was first published by Heinemann in 1956. It is the first of two sequels to Garnett's Carnegie Prize-winning book, The Family from One End Street, which was published by Muller in 1937.

Eve Garnett originally wrote The Further Adventures of the Family from One End Street shortly after The Family from One End Street had been published to general acclaim in 1937. Part of the manuscript was published in Junior Bookshelf in 1940 with a note that the war was holding up publication. However, before The Further Adventures could be published the manuscript was badly damaged in an accidental fire at her parents' home in 1941 in which she lost nearly all her possessions. By 1950 some of the chapters had been deciphered and were published in Collins Magazine, but Garnett then abandoned the work of recovering the rest of the manuscript. Eventually she deciphered most of the burned pages. That part of the manuscript which remained completely legible had already been published in Junior Bookshelf magazine.

The two elements were combined and Heinemann published the book in hardback in 1956. Its setting is the late 1930s; earlier than its publication date. It first appeared in Puffin Books in 1963.

This is the story of the Ruggles siblings Kate, Peg and Jo — three of the seven children of Mr Ruggles the dustman and Mrs Ruggles the washerwoman — who go on holiday to the Dew Drop Inn, in the fictional rural village of Upper Cassington, while Peg and Jo convalesce from the measles and Kate takes the opportunity to learn about agriculture, her planned future career.

Garnett subsequently wrote a final book in the series, Holiday at the Dew Drop Inn, which details Kate's return visit to Upper Cassington alone the following summer, with the setting remaining as the late 1930s. This was first published by Heinemann in 1962.

== Reviews ==
When the book was published one reviewer wrote that there was a fairy tale quality about the family. The gentle detailed stories would satisfy the youngest readers over and over again.
