= Eileen Power =

British historian (1889–1940)

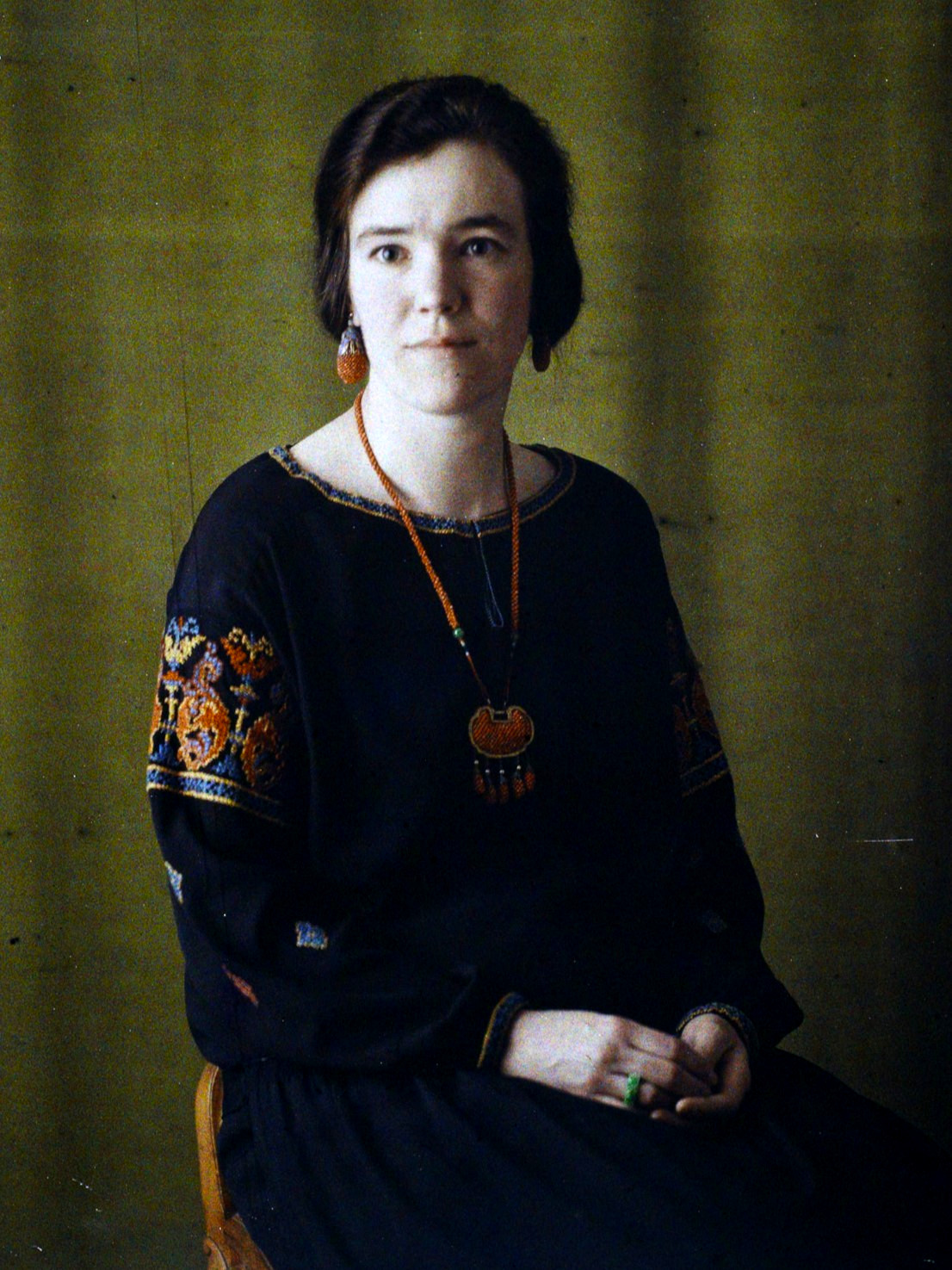
- 1926 Autochrome by Auguste Léon
- Born: 9 January 1889; Altrincham, England
- Died: 8 August 1940 (aged 51); London, England
- Education: Girton College, Cambridge; University of Paris
- Occupation: Historian
- Spouse: M. M. Postan (m. 1937)

Eileen Edna Le Poer Power (9 January 1889 – 8 August 1940) was a British economic historian and medievalist.

== Early life and education ==
Eileen Power was the eldest daughter of Philip Ernest Le Poer Power (born 1860), a stockbroker, and Mabel Grindley, née Clegg (1866–1903). and was born at Altrincham, Cheshire (now part of Greater Manchester) in 1889. She was a sister of Rhoda Power, the children's writer and broadcaster, and Beryl Millicent Le Poer Power, a civil servant (1891–1974). When she was three her father was arrested for fraud and the family moved to Bournemouth to live with Benson Clegg (Power's grandfather). After her mother died of tuberculosis when Power was only 14, she moved to Oxford with her two sisters to live with her aunt. Power was educated at the Oxford High School for Girls, then matriculated at Girton College, Cambridge, and the Sorbonne.

Power was a granddaughter of the Rev. Philip Bennett Power. Philip Power, a prolific writer of evangelical tracts, was originally from Waterford, Ireland.

== Career ==
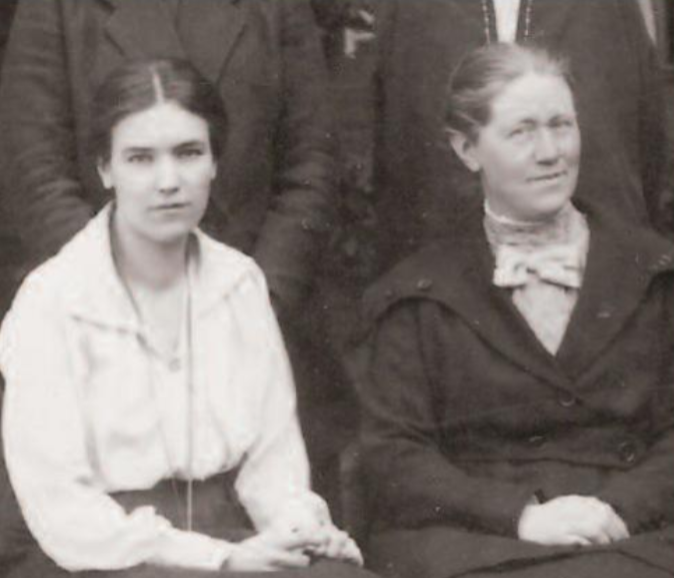
Eileen Power in 1919 with Frances Cave-Brown-Cave

Power was Director of Studies in History at Girton College, University of Cambridge (1913–1921), Lecturer in Political Science at the London School of Economics (1921–1924), and Reader of the University of London (1924–1931). In 1910, she was awarded the Gilchrist research fellowship and studied at the University of Paris and the École des Chartes. From 1922 until her death in 1940 she lived in Mecklenburgh Square, on the fringes of Bloomsbury.

In 1931, she became the second woman to be appointed to the Chair of Economic History at the London School of Economics (LSE).

When she was appointed, three specific reasons were mentioned: "(1) Her contributions by research to the advancement of social and economic history; (2) her known powers as a teacher; and (3) her high standing as a social and economic historian".

Power was the first woman to be awarded the Albert Kahn travelling scholarship in 1920, despite the panel's concern that ladies 'might commit matrimony' defeating the 'objects of the trust'. The Albert Kahn travelling scholarship was founded to "enable persons of proved intellectual attainments to enjoy a year's travel round the world, free from all professional pursuits, with a view to an unprejudiced survey of various civilizations, a comparison of other human values with those already known, and the acquisition of a more generous and philosophic outlook on human life." She travelled to India, China and Japan. She fell in love with China and returned several times during her lifetime. She produced a report on her travels during 1921 entitled Report to the Trustees of the Albert Kahn Travelling Fellowship, September 1920 – September 1921.

A specialist in medieval history, when broadcasting the BBC schools programmes (with Rhoda Power), she was determined to emphasise social history over dates and battles. Power also believed that history reaching could promote a sense of world citizenship by extending people's feeling of solidarity beyond their own country.

Her most famous book, Medieval People, was published in 1924. In 1927, Power founded the Economic History Review. In 1933, she joined the head of LSE, William Beveridge, in establishing the Academic Freedom Committee, an organization that helped academics fleeing from Nazi Germany. A critic of Britain's foreign policy, Power was an active member of the Union of Democratic Control.

From 1926 onward, she and Edward Denison Ross edited The Broadway Travellers, a book series of 26 works which was published by George Routledge & Sons. At LSE, she mentored Eleanora Carus-Wilson.

She was made corresponding fellow of the Medieval Academy of America in 1936, she received an honorary DLitt from Mount Holyoke College in 1937.

In 1937, Power married her pupil and colleague, the historian Michael Postan, Professor of Economic History at the University of Cambridge, having previously been engaged to Reginald Johnston, tutor to the last Emperor of China, Puyi. She died of heart failure in 1940.

Her book, The Wool Trade in English Medieval History (1941), was published posthumously. Medieval Women was reissued in 1975. In the 1940s, her sister endowed a "Power Feast" in Eileen's memory for some of the world's eminent historians to gather in honour of her immense contribution to historical scholarship. This is still celebrated at Girton College to this day.

In 2017, she was featured in a conference, London's Women Historians, held at the Institute of Historical Research.

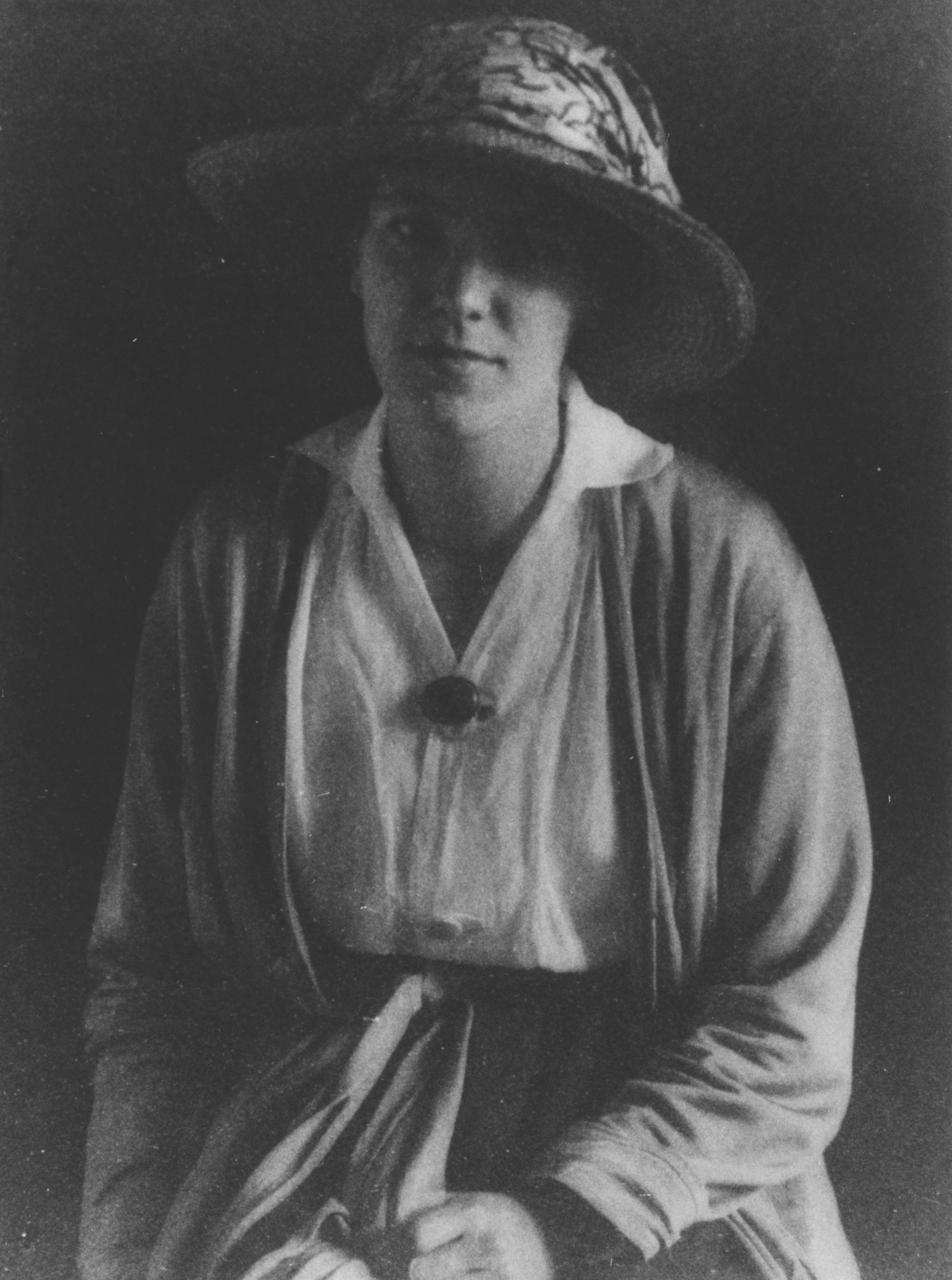
Portrait taken in 1922

== Works ==
- The Paycockes of Coggeshall (1919)
- The Unconquered Knight. A Chronicle of the Deeds of Don Pero Nino, Count of Buelna de Gamez (1920) editor
- Medieval English Nunneries (1922)
- Medieval People (1924)
- Tudor Economic Documents (1924, three volumes) editor with R. H. Tawney
- Don Juan of Persia: A Shiah Catholic (1926) editor with E. Denison Ross
- Pero Tafur travels and adventures 1435–1439 (1926) editor with E. Denison Ross
- Boys & Girls of History (1926) with Rhoda Power
- The Diary of Henry Teonge, Chaplain on Board H.M.'s Ships Assistance, Bristol, and Royal Oak, 1675–1679, editor with E. Denison Ross
- John Macdonald Travels (1745–1779) (1927) editor with E. Denison Ross
- Cities and Their Stories, an Introduction to the Study Of European History (1927) with Rhoda Power
- Hans Staden. The True History of His Captivity – 1557 (1928) editor with E. Denison Ross
- Hernando Cortes – Five Letters 1519–1526 (1928) editor with E. Denison Ross
- Huc & Gabet. Travels in Tartary, Thibet and China 1844–46, George Routledge (1928, 2 volumes) ed. Eileen Power and E. Denison Ross
- The Goodman of Paris (Le Ménagier de Paris): A Treatise on Moral and Domestic Economy by a Citizen of Paris c. 1393 (1928) translator
- More Boys & Girls of History (1928) with Rhoda Power
- Memoirs of Lorenzo Da Ponte : Mozart's Librettist (1929) editor with Elizabeth Drew
- Sir Lancelot of the Lake : a French Prose Romance of the Thirteenth Century (1929) editor with G. G. Coulton
- The Autobiography of Ousama (1929) editor with G. G. Coulton
- Jahangir and the Jesuits by Fernao Guerreiro, ed. Eileen Power and E. Denison Ross (1930); Routledge (2004) ISBN 0-415-34482-4
- The Works of Liudprand of Cremona (1930) editor with G. C. Coulton
- Madame D'Aulnoy: Travels into Spain (1930) editor with E. Denison Ross
- English Trade in 15th Century (1933) with Michael Postan
- Bernal Diaz Del Castillo, the Discovery and Conquest of Mexico 1517–1521 (1936) editor with E. Denison Ross
- The Wool Trade in English Medieval History (1941) The Ford Lectures for 1939.
- Cambridge Economic History of Europe, Vol. 1: The Agrarian Life of the Middle Ages (1942) editor with J. H. Clapham
- Medieval Women (1975)
- Thomas Gage The English-American A New Survey of the West Indies 1648 editor with E. Denison Ross
