= Visitors from London =

1940 children's novel by Kitty Barne

- Front cover of first edition
- Author: Kitty Barne
- Illustrator: Ruth Gervis
- Language: English
- Genre: Children's war novel (home front)
- Publisher: J. M. Dent
- Publication date: 1940
- Publication place: United Kingdom
- Media type: Print (hardcover)
- Pages: 262 pp (first edition)
- OCLC: 152406848
- LC Class: PZ7.B2593 Vi

Visitors from London is a children's novel written by Kitty Barne, illustrated with 40 drawings by Ruth Gervis, published by Dent in 1940. Set in Sussex, it is a story of World War II on the home front; it features preparing for and hosting children evacuated from London. Barne and Visitors won the annual Carnegie Medal for British children's books.

Dodd, Mead published a U.S. edition within the calendar year.

== Plot summary ==
The setting is the Sussex countryside during the summer holidays of 1939. The four Farrar children are spending the holidays with their eccentric Aunt Myra. War seems far away, but is soon to impinge on their lives. Seventeen young Cockney evacuees who have never been out of London are coming to stay at Steadings, a nearby farmhouse which has been standing empty. The Farrars help with the preparations, finding staff and generally organizing everything. Then the evacuees arrive, and the Farrars find themselves out of their depth.

== Origins ==
The author knew the subject first hand, being involved in Operation Pied Piper, the initial phase of the evacuation of children from the cities to the English countryside during the Second World War. As a member of the Women's Voluntary Service she was responsible for the reception of evacuees in Sussex.

== Literary significance and reception ==
Visitors from London reflected a real-life situation with serious intent and was important in its day. Kitty Barne was a popular and prolific writer of the time but her books have dated. Visitors from London was the first of the Carnegie Medal winners to go out of print. That may have been partly because of its topicality, but it has been criticized as being "patronising in its attitude to evacuees and nowhere near the author's best work".

When the book was published in America in 1941, the New York Times was enthusiastic: "This is the first story for boys and girls of their contemporaries in wartime England and one which may be unreservedly recommended, for they will find in it much of the gay courage and matter-of-fact acceptance of conditions which their parents have found in Mrs. Miniver and Letter from England." Again it is the social context which is considered the main point.

The humour of the book is praised by Marcus Crouch, who says: "Kitty Barne sought out, with characteristic sincerity and sharp observation, the comic, as well as the pathetic, elements in the strange social experiment of the Evacuation... [exploring] with good-humoured shrewdness the dilemmas of the visitors and the visited."

== See also ==
Awards
| Preceded by The Radium Woman | Carnegie Medal recipient 1940 | Succeeded by We Couldn't Leave Dinah |
