= Herbert Best =

American novelist (1894–1980)

- Best c. 1944
- Born: Oswald Herbert Best; March 25, 1894
- Died: July 1980 (aged 86)
- Occupation: Writer
- Spouse: Erick Berry
- Writing career
- Genres: Children's literature Science fiction
- Notable work: Garram the Hunter: A Boy of the Hill Tribes

Oswald Herbert Best (March 25, 1894 – July 1980) was a British-American author of children's literature and science fiction.

== Early and personal life ==
Best was born on March 25, 1894. He married fellow author Allena Champlin, better known by her pen name Erick Berry. He held bachelor's degrees in arts and laws from Queens' College, Cambridge. He died in July 1980, at the age of 86.

== Career ==
Best published a number of books between the 1930s and '60s. Many of his works were for children, and illustrated by Berry. One of these was perhaps his most lauded work, Garram the Hunter: A Boy of the Hill Tribes, published in 1930. It won a Newbery Honor in 1931. He also wrote at least one work of science fiction, 1940's The Twenty-Fifth Hour.

Outside of his writing career, he fought in World War I and spent time working for the British Civil Service in Nigeria as an administrative officer. His experiences in Africa were significant influences on some of his works. He was a Fellow of the Royal Geographical Society.

== Bibliography ==
- Garram the Hunter: A Boy of the Hill Tribes: 1930
- Flag of the Desert: 1936
- Tal of the Four Tribes: 1938
- The Twenty-Fifth Hour: 1940
- Gunsmith's Boy: 1942
- Young'Un: 1944
- Border Iron: 1945
- Whistle, Daughter, Whistle: 1947
- The Long Portage: A Story of Ticonderoga and Lord Howe: 1948
- Not Without Danger: A Story of the Colony of Jamaica in Revolutionary Days: 1951
- Watergate: A Story of the Irish on the Erie Canal: 1951
- Ranger's Ransom: 1953
- The Columbus Cannon: 1954
- Diane: 1954
- The Sea Warriors: 1959
- The Webfoot Warriors: The story of UDT, U.S. Navy's Underwater Demolition Team: 1962
- Underwater Warriors: Story of the American Frogmen: 1967

=== Desmond the Dog Detective series ===
- Desmond's First Case: 1961
- Desmond the Dog Detective: The Case of the Lone Stranger: 1962
- Desmond and the Peppermint Ghost: 1965
- Desmond and Dog Friday: 1968

=== With Erick Berry ===
- Concertina Farm: 1943
- Men Who Changed the Map: 1968
- The Polynesian Triangle: 1968
