= Garram the Hunter: A Boy of the Hill Tribes =

Award winning children's novel first published in 1930

- Author: Herbert Best
- Illustrator: Erick Berry
- Language: English
- Genre: Children's literature
- Publisher: Doubleday
- Publication date: 1930
- Publication place: United States

Garram the Hunter: A Boy of the Hill Tribes is a 1930 children's novel written by Herbert Best and illustrated by Erick Berry. Inspired by Best's time in Africa pre-colonization as a civil servant, it follows the adventures of Garram, the son of a village chieftain in the Nigerian hills. The novel was a Newbery Honor recipient in 1931.
