= Anne Dempster Kyle =

American children's author

- Born: October 18, 1896; Frankford, Pennsylvania, US
- Died: September 21, 1966; Winter Park, Florida, US
- Occupation: Author
- Writing career
- Genre: Children's literature

Anne Dempster Kyle (October 18, 1896 – September 21, 1966) was an American children's author. Her book The Apprentice of Florence was a Newbery Honor recipient in 1934.

== Biography ==
Anne Dempster Kyle was born in Frankford, Pennsylvania. Her father, Melvin Grove Kyle, was a noted theologian and archeologist.

Kyle wrote four novels for children: Crusaders' Gold (1928), Prince of the Pale Mountains (1929), The Apprentice of Florence (1933), and Red Sky over Rome (1938).

Kyle died in Winter Park, Florida, in 1966. She is buried in Palm Cemetery in Winter Park.
