= Eve Garnett =

English writer and illustrator (1900–1991)

- Born: 9 January 1900; Worcestershire, England
- Died: 5 April 1991 (aged 91); Lewes, East Sussex
- Occupations: writer and illustrator
- Writing career
- Language: English
- Genre: novels
- Notable work: The Family from One End Street

Eve Garnett (9 January 1900 – 5 April 1991) was an English writer and illustrator. She is best known for The Family from One End Street, a 1937 children's novel that features a large, small-town, working-class family.

== Early life ==
Eve Cynthia Ruth Garnett was born in Worcestershire and educated at Bideford Convent school in Devon and Gardenhurst girls' school in Burnham-on-Sea, Somerset. She then went to the Chelsea Polytechnic School of Art and the Royal Academy Schools, and eventually exhibited at the Tate Gallery, the Lefevre Gallery and the New English Art Club.

== Career ==
Garnett was commissioned to illustrate Evelyn Sharp's 1927 book The London Child and the work left her "appalled by conditions prevailing in the poorer quarters of the world's richest city". She determined to show up some of the evils of poverty and extreme class division in the United Kingdom, especially in contemporary London. To that end she worked on a 40-foot mural at the Children's House in Bow, founded by sisters Doris and Muriel Lester. Garnett also completed a book of drawings with commentary called Is It Well With The Child? (1938).

She remains best known for her work of the previous year: writing and illustrating a story book that dealt with the social conditions of the English working class, which was exceptional in children's literature. That book, The Family from One End Street, was rejected by several publishers who deemed it "not suitable for the young", but eventually published by Frederick Muller in 1937. It won the second annual Carnegie Medal from the Library Association, recognising the year's outstanding children's book by a British subject. (It beat Tolkien's The Hobbit among others.) The medal was among her possessions in a fire in 1941. It was salvaged, but ruined with all the gold having been burned off. For the 70th anniversary of the Medal, it was named one of the top ten Medal-winning works, selected by a panel to compose the ballot for a public election of the all-time favourite. It is regarded as a classic, having remained in print to the present day.

The manuscript of a sequel, Further Adventures of the Family from One End Street, was damaged in a fire in 1941, and thought to be destroyed, but it was partly deciphered and partly assembled from a magazine and finally published by Heinemann in 1956. A third book in the series, Holiday at the Dew Drop Inn, was published by Heinemann in 1962.

She was also an enthusiastic traveller, and spent much of her time in northern latitudes, claiming to have crossed the Arctic Circle 16 times. She was particularly interested in the Dano-Norwegian explorer and missionary Hans Egede, and made many visits to Norway to study his life. Out of this research came a radio play, The Doll's House in the Arctic, and the 1968 book To Greenland's Icy Mountains.

== Later life and death ==
Garnett lived in and around Lewes, East Sussex for many years and the town provided inspiration for her best-known books. In later life she lived at 12 Keere Street, which now has a plaque recording her life and work. She moved to a nursing home in nearby Ringmer, then died in Lewes hospital on 5 April 1991.

== Works ==
Garnett wrote seven books which were all self-illustrated.

- The Family from One End Street: And Some of Their Adventures (Frederick Muller, 1937)
- In and Out and Roundabout: Stories of a Little Town (Muller, 1948)
- Further Adventures of the Family from One End Street (Heinemann, 1956)
- Holiday at the Dew Drop Inn (Heinemann, 1962)
- To Greenland's Icy Mountains: The Story of Hans Egede, Explorer, Coloniser, Missionary (Heinemann, 1968), illustrated with photographs and drawings by Garnett
- Lost and Found: Four Stories (Muller, 1974)
- First Affections: Some Autobiographical Chapters of Early Childhood (Muller, 1982)

As illustrator

- The London Child (John Lane, 1927), by Evelyn Sharp
- The Bad Barons of Crashbania: Vol. 42, Continuous Stories, Jolly Books (Blackwell, 1932), by Norman Hunter
- Is it Well With the Child? (Muller, 1938), "drawings by Eve Garnett ... with an introduction by Marjorie Bowen and a foreword by Walter de la Mare"
- A Child's Garden of Verses (Penguin, 1948), Robert Louis Stevenson (1870)
- A Book of the Seasons: An Anthology (Oxford University Press, 1952), "made and decorated by Eve Garnett"
- A Golden Land (Constable, 1958), edited by James Reeves
