= Kitty Barne =

British screenwriter and author (1882–1961)

- Born: Marion Catherine Barne; 17 November 1882; Petersham, Surrey
- Died: 3 February 1961 (aged 78); Darenth, Dartford, Kent
- Other name: Kitty Streatfeild
- Citizenship: British
- Education: Royal College of Music
- Occupations: Author, screenwriter
- Spouse: Eric Streatfeild
- Relatives: Noel Streatfeild (cousin-in-law)

Marion Catherine "Kitty" Barne (17 November 1882 – 3 February 1961) (also known as Kitty Streatfeild) was a British screenwriter and author of children's books, especially on music and musical themes. She won the 1940 Carnegie Medal for British children's books.

== Biography ==
Barne was born in Petersham, Surrey, but was brought up in Somerset and Sussex, and later studied at the Royal College of Music. On 12 April 1912, in Eastbourne, she married Eric Streatfeild, thus becoming the cousin-in-law of another popular children's writer Noel Streatfeild. Eric Streatfeild was the first cousin of Noel Streatfeild's father.

Barne was a member of the Women's Voluntary Service, responsible for the reception of children evacuated to Sussex. During the war years, she published six novels, most notably Visitors from London about evacuees (J. M. Dent, 1940). For that work she won the annual Carnegie Medal from the Library Association, recognising the year's best children's book by a British subject.

She is possibly best known now for her pony books Rosina Copper and its sequel Rosina and Son, about the true story of an Argentine polo pony mare that was rescued from neglect after being ordered to be killed. They were illustrated by Alfons Purtscher and Marcia Lane Foster respectively.

Apart from her novels, she wrote some non-fiction books, including a biography of Elizabeth Fry (who was her husband's great-grandmother) in 1950, a book about the orchestra, a history of the Girl Guides and a book of Camp Fire Songs (1944). She was Commissioner for Music and Drama for the Girl Guides for some years where she was assisted by Mary Chater. Ruth Gervis, the illustrator of a number of her books, said of her:

To an illustrator, Kitty Barne was a most delightful author, not because she gave one a free hand, far from it, but because she knew exactly what she wanted and was so delighted when one caught her visual images. It was a true collaboration of author and artist. We would meet and then, her good ear towards me, her eyes shining, her face alive with interest, she would discuss her characters. I used to make dozens of quick sketches until I got them as she pictured them, helped by her interjections, 'Oh, rather a higher forehead and even deeper set eyes' or 'oh, no you've made her far too nice, I think she is a horrid little girl.' We would laugh together over her amusing adults as she suggested incidents for me to sketch which would bring out their characteristics.

Chosen for Children, 1977.

She died on 3 February 1961 after a long illness.

== Selected works ==
- The Easter Holidays aka Secret of the Sandhills (1935)
- She Shall Have Music (1938)
- Family Footlights (1939)
- Visitors from London (1940)
- Listening to the Orchestra (1941)
- May I Keep Dogs? aka Bracken, My Dog (1941)
- We'll Meet in England (1942)
- The Amber Gate (1942)
- Three and a Pigeon (1944)
- In the Same Boat (1945)
- Here Come the Girl Guides (1946)
- Musical Honours (1947)
- Bracken My Dog (1949)
- Dusty's Windmill (1949)
- Roly's Dog (1950)
- Elizabeth Fry: a story biography (1950)
- The Windmill Mystery (1950)
- Barbie (1952)
- Admiral's Walk (1953)
- Music Perhaps (1953)
- Rosina Copper (1954)
- Tann's Boarders (1955)
- Rosina and Son (1956)
