= Marion Havighurst =

American children's author

Marion Margaret Boyd Havighurst
- Born: Marion Margaret Boyd; January 6, 1894; Marietta, Ohio, US
- Died: February 24, 1974 (aged 80); Oxford, Ohio, US
- Occupation: Author
- Writing career
- Genres: Poetry, children's literature

Marion Havighurst (née Boyd, January 6, 1894 – February 24, 1974) was an American poet, novelist, and author of children's books. Her book Song of the Pines: A Story of Norwegian Lumbering in Wisconsin, co-written with her husband, Walter Havighurst, was a Newbery Honor recipient in 1950.

== Biography ==
Marion Margaret Boyd was born in Marietta, Ohio and lived there until the age of four; most of her life was spent in Oxford, Ohio. Her father, William Waddell Boyd, was president of the Western College for Women from 1914 to 1931. Marion Boyd attended Western herself as well as Smith College, and later earned a master's degree from Yale University. Later she would teach English at Western and at adjacent Miami University.

Boyd's first book, Silver Wands, was published in 1923 as part of the Yale Younger Poets series.

Boyd met Walter Havighurst while teaching at Miami; they had both been assigned the same office. They married in 1930, and Boyd would use her married name of Havighurst for most of her future publications.

Havighurst's books included Murder in the Stacks (1934, as Marion Boyd), the first modern mystery novel to use an academic library as its setting; Strange Island (1957), a book for young people about the Burr conspiracy; and The Sycamore Tree (1960), a book set during the American Civil War that Kirkus Reviews described as written "with grace and feeling."

Havighurst also collaborated with her husband on three children's books: High Prairie (1944), Song of the Pines (1949), and Climb a Lofty Ladder (1952). Song of the Pines was one of five Newbery Honor titles named in 1950.

Havighurst died on February 24, 1974, at the McCullough-Hyde Memorial Hospital in Oxford, Ohio. She was survived by her husband; her remains were cremated.
