= Robert Gibbings =

Irish artist and author (1889–1958)

Robert John Gibbings
- Born: 23 March 1889; Cork, Ireland
- Died: 19 January 1958 (aged 68); Long Wittenham, Berkshire (now Oxfordshire), England
- Education: University College Cork; Slade School of Art; Central School of Art and Design
- Known for: Wood Engraving, Sculpture, Writing
- Spouse: Moira Pennefather (m. 1919)
- Relatives: Robert Day (grandfather)
- Military career
- Allegiance: United Kingdom
- Branch: British Army
- Unit: Royal Munster Fusiliers
- Conflicts: World War I; Gallipoli campaign

Robert John Gibbings (23 March 1889 – 19 January 1958) was an Irish artist and author who was most noted for his work as a wood engraver and sculptor, and for his books on travel and natural history. Along with Noel Rooke, he was one of the founder members of the Society of Wood Engravers in 1920, and was a major influence in the revival of wood engraving in the twentieth century.

== Early life ==
Gibbings was born in Cork into a middle-class family. His father, the Reverend Edward Gibbings, was a Church of Ireland minister. His mother, Caroline, was the daughter of Robert Day, Fellow of the Royal Society of Antiquaries of Ireland and president of The Cork Historical and Archaeological Society. He grew up in the town of Kinsale where his father was the rector of St Multose Church.

He studied medicine for three years at University College Cork before deciding to persuade his parents to allow him to take up art. He studied under the painter Harry Scully in Cork and later at the Slade School of Art and the Central School of Art and Design.

During the First World War he served in the Royal Munster Fusiliers and was wounded at Gallipoli in the Dardanelles, was invalided out and resumed his studies in London.

In 1919 he married Moira Pennefather, daughter of Lieutenant Colonel Edward Graham Pennefather from Tipperary, with whom he had four children, Patrick (1920), Brigid (1923) and Lawrence and Finnbar (1927).

Poster issued by the Underground Electric Railways Company of London Ltd (1922)

== Founding of the Society of Wood Engravers ==
Gibbings's early contact with Noel Rooke at the Central School set the course of the rest of his artistic career when he asked Rooke: "Is it very foolish of me to try to be an artist?" and received the reply: "What else could you do?". Life as an artist meant life as a wood engraver, and a life where Gibbings often struggled financially whilst, at the same time, receiving critical acclaim.

This was the case at this stage of his life. The critical acclaim came with an article in the Studio in February 1919, which reproduced a number of engravings, including two colour wood engravings. Commissioned work was more of a problem. Joseph Thorp obtained commercial commissions for Eno's Fruit Salts, Matinée cigarettes and Findlater's Port. For the London Underground he produced a poster for Wisley and a publicity booklet for London Zoo (1922), now considered to be the first of his published works, and the rarest.

In 1922 Gibbings produced a wood engraving for the dust jacket of The Oppidan by Shane Leslie and in 1923 he illustrated Erewhon by Samuel Butler.

He was very much at the centre of developments in wood engraving. He was a founder member and leading light of the Society of Wood Engravers, which he set up with Noel Rooke in 1920. In 1922 he contributed two wood engravings to Contemporary English Woodcuts, an anthology of wood engravings produced by Thomas Balston, a director at Duckworth and an enthusiast for the new style of wood engravings. Campbell Dodgson, Keeper of Prints and Drawings at the British Museum, wrote about him in his introduction to the book: "The 'Cubist' or 'Post-Impressionist' element is represented by Mr. Gibbings". The two engravings by Gibbings were 'Clear Waters', a strikingly modern nude, and 'Hamrun', both examples of his 'vanishing line' technique.

In 1923 Gibbings received a commission for a set of wood engravings for The Lives of Gallant Ladies for the Golden Cockerel Press, his most important commission to date at 100 guineas.

== Running the Golden Cockerel Press ==
Gibbings was working on the wood engravings The Lives of Gallant Ladies when Hal Taylor, the owner of the press, became very ill with tuberculosis and had to put it up for sale. He sought a loan from a friend, Hubert Pike, a director of Bentley Motors, to buy the press. He took over in February 1924, paying £850 for the huts housing the business, the plant, and goodwill. For the partially completed Gallant Ladies a further sum of £200 was paid. He also leased the house and land for £40 per annum. Gallant Ladies sold well with receipts of over £1,800, and saw the start of a golden period for the press and Gibbings and his family.

The printing staff – Frank Young, Albert Cooper, and Harry Gibbs – were skilled and capable of very fine work. Moira Gibbings helped her husband in the business, and Gibbings kept close links with A.E. Coppard, who had helped Taylor with the business side of the press and who was to become a close friend. Gibbings knew all the leading wood engravers of the day and a number of authors, which enabled him to publish modern texts as well as classic ones.

The first book for which Gibbings was entirely responsible was Moral Maxims by Rochefoucault (1924). Eric Gill was brought into the fold when he quarrelled with Hilary Pepler over the publication of Enid Clay's Sonnets and Verses (1925) and transferred the book to Gibbings. In 1925 he went on to commission engravings from John Nash, Noel Rooke, David Jones, John Farleigh and Mabel Annesley among others.

Gibbings published some 71 titles at the press and printed a number of books for others. The size of a run was normally between 250 and 750, and the books were mostly bound in leather by bookbinders Sangorski & Sutcliffe. The major titles were the four volume Canterbury Tales (1929 to 1931) and the Four Gospels (1931), both illustrated by Gill. Gibbings printed 15 copies of the Canterbury Tales on vellum, and 12 copies of the Four Gospels. Printing the Canterbury Tales dominated work at the press for two and a half years, and relatively few other books were printed during that period. However, the book was a considerable critical and financial success and grossed £14,000. Four Gospels was equally successful, and sold out shortly after publication in November 1931.

Gibbings produced a number of books with his own wood engravings at the press, the high points being The True History of Lucian (1927) and Lamia by John Keats (1928).

Sales were strong during most of this period. Gibbings had established links with a number of booksellers, notably Bumpus in London, and negotiated a very favourable deal with Random House in the USA. He bought out Pike with finance from another Irish friend, Mary Wiggin, and later bought her out, borrowing the money from Barclays Bank.

The Gibbings family had moved to Waltham Saint Lawrence when they bought the press. Gibbings and Moira indulged in a rather unconventional and hedonistic lifestyle (neither had any inhibitions about nudity), and saw a good deal of Gill, with whom they had a very easy-going relationship. Gibbings never settled into family life, and this became an issue for Moira as time passed.

Although much of his time was taken up by running the press, Gibbings did work for other publishers. He illustrated The Charm of Birds by Viscount Grey of Falloden (1927) for Hodder & Stoughton, and A Mirror for Witches by Esther Forbes (1928) for Houghton Mifflin. When he sent the blocks to Houghton he added in his letter: "Next time you give me a job, for God's sake send me to the South Seas – I'm sick of English fogs". They were so impressed by the success of this book that they commissioned Gibbings to illustrate with wood engravings a book set in Tahiti that would be written by James Norman Hall, the author of Mutiny on the Bounty. Gibbings leapt at the chance and in 1929 he set out for Tahiti. He completed the wood engravings, but Hall did not complete the text. However, two books did emerge from this visit, The Seventh Man (1930), written, illustrated and published at the Golden Cockerel Press by Gibbings, and Iorana (1932), a semi-fictitious account by Gibbings of his time in Tahiti. Houghton published a bowdlerised version, and Duckworth the full version.

In February 1932 Gibbings wrote to the owners of the Orient Line suggesting that he produce wood engravings for their publicity in return for a free cruise. They agreed, and he produced XIV Engravings on Wood for them, one of which was also used as a poster.

Moira was less than delighted that Gibbings had twice left her in charge of the business and their family on her own and with very little consultation. Lawrence had tuberculosis and she decided to leave for South Africa to join her mother, taking the three youngest children. She returned in 1936 to finalise her divorce from Gibbings.

In the early 1930s the business climate had changed, and, as American sales had faltered, Gibbings had struggled on as the depression became more severe. The press was now moribund and Gibbings eventually sold up in 1933. The last book that he produced was Lord Adrian by Lord Dunsany (1933), illustrated with his own wood engravings.

== Lecturing at Reading University ==
Gibbings had lost his livelihood and his family, though not his home. He did not sell the grounds and buildings of the press, as the new owners moved the press to London. To save money he moved out of the cottage into one of the huts in the grounds, and his son Patrick, who was at St Piran's Independent School in Maidenhead, stayed in another one when he was at home at the weekend. He did not seem deeply distressed about the loss of his family, although he did build up a close relationship with Patrick. The money from the sale of the press was enough to clear his debts, and a cloud seemed to lift. He wrote: "But what peace of mind when standing in the wooden hut to which I had moved, I could look about me and see not one thing that was worth five shillings to anyone else!"

In 1934 he completed the two books that he considered to be his best, Beasts and Saints by Helen Waddell and Glory of Life by Llewelyn Powys. Glory of Life was produced by Gibbings, but published by the new owners of the Golden Cockerel Press.

This was the beginning of a sustained period as an author illustrator. In 1935 he produced A True Tale of Love in Tonga, another picture book along the lines of The Seventh Man, followed in 1936 by Coconut Island, a book for children. Both of these were based on his experiences in the South Seas, and were followed by John Graham, Convict (1937), a version of a true account set in Australia.

His reputation was growing and he was commissioned by Penguin Books to write a travel book. He went to Bermuda and the Red Sea, and wrote and illustrated Blue Angels and Whales (1938). This was the first original writing commissioned by Penguin. The book led to Gibbings's appointment as art director of a new series of Penguin Illustrated Classics. The first ten titles, launched in May 1938, were illustrated by Gibbings (he illustrated Herman Melville's Typee) and other wood engravers. The series was not a success and was discontinued after the issue of the first ten titles. Penguin did, however, publish Coconut Island in 1945 as a Puffin Story Book, as well as his wood engravings to books by Eleanor Doorly – The Insect Man (1942), The Microbe Man (1943) and The Radium Woman (1953).

As well as writing his own books, he continued to produce wood engravings for other commissions, such as George Scott-Moncrieff's A Book of Uncommon Prayer (1937) for Methuen, where each short poem such as "The Cormorant" faced one of his images. The cormorant prays "Give me the green wave force, / Show me where / The sweetest fishes swim". He continued to illustrate books for the Golden Cockerel Press and other publishers, designed a greetings telegram for the GPO, became involved with the Sun Bathing review and produced adverts for Shell Oil.

There were two major changes in his life. He had numbers of visitors from Reading University, one of whom was Elisabeth Empson. Early in 1934 she discovered that she was pregnant. This came as something of a shock to her parents. There was a twenty-year age difference between her and Gibbings, and he was unable to marry her as he was still married to Moira. The couple moved down to Cornwall, where their daughter Vahine was born in November 1934 – they had two more children, another daughter Tiare (1937) and Shaun (1946). Elisabeth's parents came to accept the relationship, and gave the couple the money to build a cottage in the grounds at Waltham Saint Lawrence in 1935. Elisabeth and Gibbings were married in 1937 after Moira finally agreed to a divorce. The relationship was always strained, for much the same reasons that Gibbings's relationship with Moira was strained. He went off, for example, on two trips to Bermuda and the Red Sea, leaving Elisabeth with two young children to look after.

A more positive change in his life was his appointment in 1936 as sessional lecturer in typography, book production and illustration at Reading University for one day a week. He was a very good teacher, and encouraged his students by producing a number of books illustrated with their wood engravings, including Fatherless Oberlus (1936), Loftur (1939) and The Diary of W. Lashly (1939), the diary of William Lashly, a survivor of Captain Scott's expedition to the South Pole.

== The river books ==
Wood engraving from Sweet Thames Run Softly

In 1940 Elisabeth and the two children were evacuated to Canada. They returned in summer 1945, a few weeks before Gibbings set off to the South Seas for well over a year.

While Elisabeth was away Gibbings moved into St Patrick's Hall, an all-male hall of residence at the university, and settled into a bachelor life that he found very congenial. The teaching and the extra-curricular life were very much to his liking, and there was one factor that led him inexorably into this next phase of his artistic life.

Gibbings had begun to take part in natural history trips to the Thames organised by the university. He later wrote: "In the early days of 1939 there arose in me a great desire to find peace beside a river". Along with Patrick and two other helpers he built himself a boat, the Willow, and floated down the Thames. The result was Sweet Thames Run Softly (1940). He took the title from Edmund Spenser's Prothalamion: "Sweete Themmes! runne softly, till I end my Song". His observations and wood engravings of the countryside, the river and its natural history, were the fruits of gentle months spent on the Thames, accompanied by sketch pad and microscope. Written at a time of great insecurity, the book captivated readers, acutely aware that the world it portrayed was in imminent danger of being wiped out. Thomas Balston wrote of Gibbings: "Few readers in these harassing days escape the longing for a simpler life, and Gibbings is very much a modern Thyrsis." He had captured a moment shared by many other people at the time, and over 140,000 copies of the book were printed.

Coming Down the Wye (1942) and Lovely is the Lee (1944) followed, based on the familiar pattern of personal encounter and anecdote, and historical and cultural research, all illustrated by his wood engravings. In August 1945 he set out for Polynesia again. He visited many of the islands and spent six months in New Zealand (including Dunedin and Napier), returning in late 1947. He recounted his travels and experiences in Over the Reefs (1948). He returned to Ireland for Sweet Cork of Thee (1951), and then crossed the English Channel to write Coming down the Seine (1953). Trumpets from Montparnasse (1955) was based on his travels in France and Italy. His final book, based on the area around Long Wittenham, was Till I end my Song (1957). The somewhat prophetic title is the second half of the couplet from Spenser's Prothalamion that begins: "Sweet Thames run softly ...".

Writing his own books and producing the wood engravings for them kept him busy, but he did illustrate other books too, the most notable being an edition of The Voyage of the Beagle by Charles Darwin (1956).

The bearded figure of Gibbings became as familiar on British television as was his voice to radio listeners. David Attenborough remembers Gibbings as being one of the inspiring influences at the start of his career.

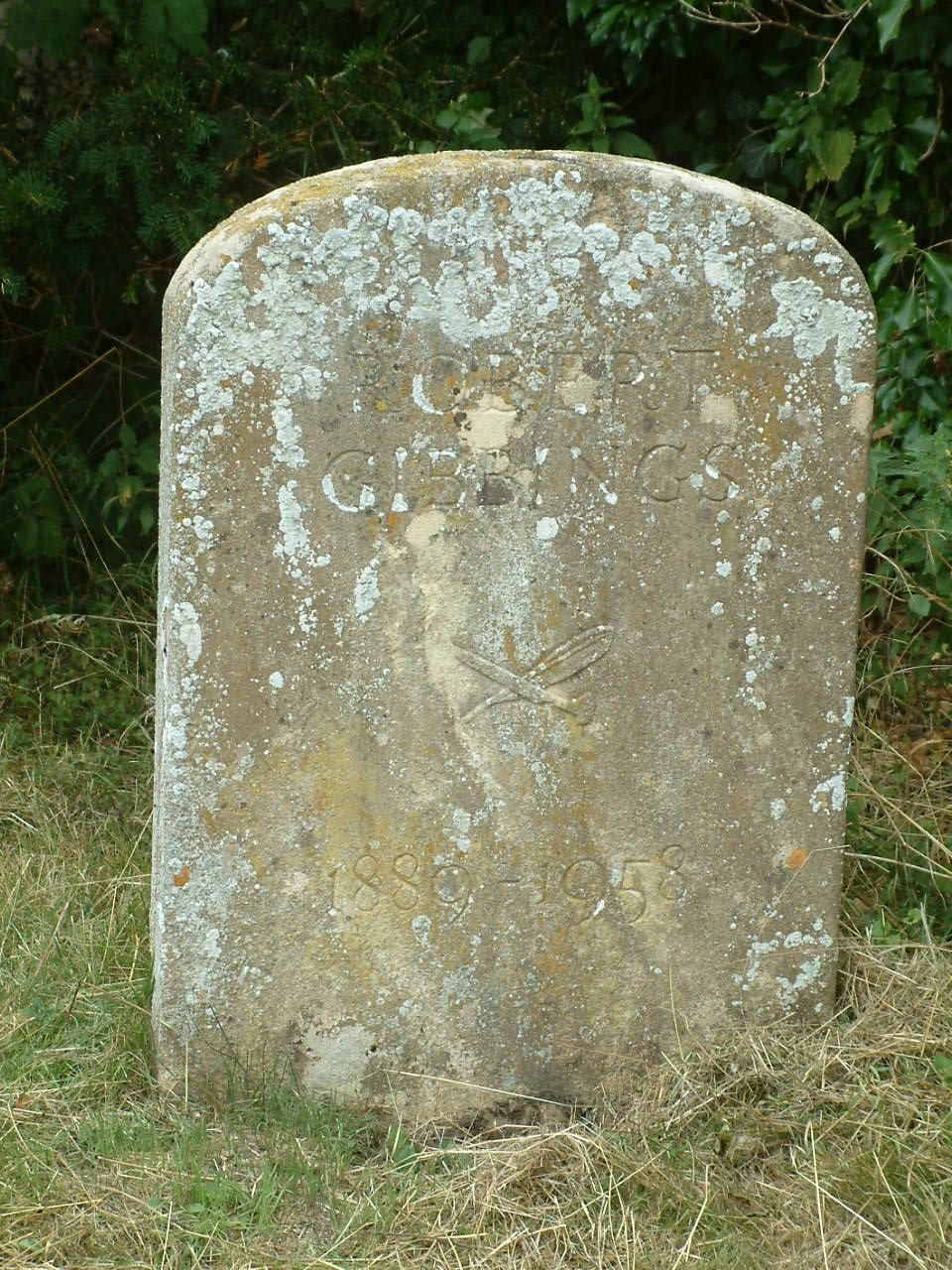
Gibbings's headstone in the churchyard at Long Wittenham

Gibbings's private life retained the turbulent nature that it had always had. Elisabeth came back to Waltham Saint Lawrence with the two girls in summer 1945, keen to have another child. Gibbings left for the South Seas after a very few weeks, leaving Elisabeth, who was by now pregnant, with their children. Their third child, Shaun, was born in April 1946. Gibbings's life at the time was complicated by his relationship with Patience Empson, Elisabeth's sister. The relationship had started when Patience typed up the manuscript for Coming Down the Wye and had since developed to the extent that she flew out to join him in Fiji in May 1946. She went mostly to help him with his writing, and partly at Elisabeth's suggestion. When Gibbings returned to England late in 1947 she stayed in New Zealand and then went to South Africa as Mrs. Empson felt that it would be improper for her to return with Gibbings. By April 1951 Elisabeth and Gibbings were divorced, and his relationship with Patience became more relaxed.

In September 1955 Patience and Gibbings bought Footbridge Cottage, a tiny beehive of a cottage in Gibbings's words, in Long Wittenham on the banks of the Thames. Life there suited Gibbings, and he had a period of tranquility that he had not known previously. They lived there until Gibbings died of cancer in hospital at Oxford on 19 January 1958. He is buried in the churchyard at Long Wittenham. The grave is marked by a simple headstone featuring his device of a crossed quill and graver, carved by Michael Black, a young sculptor who was a friend of Gibbings.

== An overview of his life and work ==
Gibbings dominates the period of the modern wood engraving revival in Britain, both by the longevity of his artistic career, and its significance. His is the most cited name in Joanna Selborne's monumental survey. He was at the centre of all the developments in wood engraving, from the cubist engravings of his vanishing line period to the traditional landscape based engravings of the river books. He ran the Golden Cockerel Press at the period when it shaped the concept of the wood engraved book.

He was gripped by the possibilities of wood engravings, by the possibilities of expression within the very formal constraints of the medium: "But slowly a love of the wood came upon me. I began to enjoy the crisp purr of the graver as it furrowed the polished surface. I began to appreciate the cleanness of the white line that it incised: even the simplest silhouettes had an austere quality, a dignity, that could not be achieved by other means. Clear, precise statement, that was what it amounted to. Near enough wouldn't do: it had to be just right".
