= The Silver Sword =

1956 children's novel by Ian Serraillier

The Silver Sword (also known as Escape from Warsaw)
- First edition
- Author: Ian Serraillier
- Illustrator: C. Walter Hodges
- Genre: Children's novel
- Publisher: Jonathan Cape
- Publication date: 1956
- Publication place: United Kingdom
- Pages: 192 (1956)
- OCLC: 154290268

The Silver Sword is a children's novel written by Ian Serraillier, originally illustrated by C. Walter Hodges, published in the United Kingdom by Jonathan Cape in 1956 and then by Puffin Books in 1960. It has also been published in the United States under the title Escape From Warsaw.

The story is of a Polish family in the Second World War. It is based on fact, although fictional names are given to a few of the places mentioned. The account of the Red Army on the march is derived from eyewitness accounts in Jan Stransky's East Wind over Prague. In an afterword to the 2003 edition Jane Serraillier Grossfeld, the author's daughter, identifies a Picture Post article about the Pestalozzi children's village as a source. The Silver Sword has been adapted for television and radio.

== Plot summary ==
The story begins in 1940 when Joseph Balicki, the headmaster of a school in Warsaw, is arrested by German soldiers for disrespecting a portrait of Hitler. Shortly after Joseph is taken, German soldiers break into the family house and take his Swiss wife, Margrit, to Germany as a forced labourer. Their 11-year-old son Edek shoots at the soldiers in a bid to save his mother and narrowly escapes the house with his 12-year-old sister Ruth and three-year-old sister Bronia before it is blown up by the soldiers. The three children begin living in a bombed-out house and Ruth starts a school for children living nearby. Edek becomes involved in the black market, smuggling food and clothes for his sisters and children living with them, and is captured by Germans searching for hoarded goods.

Joseph spends more than a year in prison before escaping and travelling back to Warsaw. He finds the ruins of his house and a paper knife – the 'silver sword' – that he gave to Margrit as a present. Joseph meets a pickpocket, Jan, and gives him the sword on the condition that Jan tells his children to meet Joseph in Switzerland if he meets them. Jan helps Joseph find a goods train going towards Germany, on which he escapes to Switzerland.

In 1944, Ruth and Bronia meet Jan, who chooses to live with them. Ruth befriends a Russian soldier who informs them that Edek is in Posen, having escaped from a German labour camp. During the soldier's visit, Jan attacks him and in the melee, Jan’s box of belongings is broken. Ruth recognises the silver sword in the box and Jan tells them Joseph’s message. Ruth, Bronia and Jan make their way to Posen and find Edek at a refugee feeding station, suffering from tuberculosis. Ruth, Bronia, Edek and Jan travel by train to Berlin in search of their parents, and arrive in the city during May 1945, just as the war in Europe ends.

The children continue south through Germany and Jan gets caught stealing food from American supply trains and sentenced to a week's detention. On his release, the children continue south and are taken in by a Bavarian farmer called Kurt. They spend several weeks working and recuperating at the farm. The Americans decree that foreigners in the area must return to their home country. Kurt helps the children escape in canoes via the local river, a tributary of the River Danube. Kurt's dog hides inside one of the canoes and joins them.

After their journey, Jan notices that they left the silver sword at Kurt's house. Jan and the dog go missing, but Ruth, Edek and Bronia continue south towards Switzerland, with Edek getting weaker. They meet an American G.I. lorry driver who gives them a lift to a Red Cross camp on the north bank of Lake Constance and reunite with Jan and the dog.

The children speak to the camp superintendent, who refuses to let them cross the lake without authority from the Swiss side. He changes his mind when he learns that their father is in Switzerland. They receive a letter from Kurt via the International Tracing Service containing the silver sword. Joseph talks to Ruth on the telephone and tells her that he will come over on the ferry to collect them.

The children walk along the shore of the lake to see the boat coming across. Edek stops to rest in an old rowing boat next to a stream and is swept out onto the lake by a sudden storm. Ruth, Bronia, and Jan find another boat and rescue Edek. They reunite with Joseph and Margrit in Switzerland and Jan's parents are never found, so the Balickis adopt him.

== Adaptations ==
In 1957, the BBC produced an eight-part children's television series, with Melvyn Hayes, then aged 22, as Edek. A further BBC television version was broadcast in 1971. In 2011, a radio adaptation was produced for BBC Radio 4 Extra.

== Legacy ==
John Boyne, author of The Boy in the Striped Pyjamas (2006), has acknowledged a debt to Serraillier's novel: "the book stands out for me as a great children's classic – [it] was my first introduction to the Second World War in fiction, to the horrors of the Nazi era, and the fear that capture could instill in the minds of its young heroes Ruth, Edek and Bronia."

== See also ==
- Occupation of Poland (1939–1945)
- Aftermath of World War II
