= Walter Havighurst =

American journalist (1901–1994)

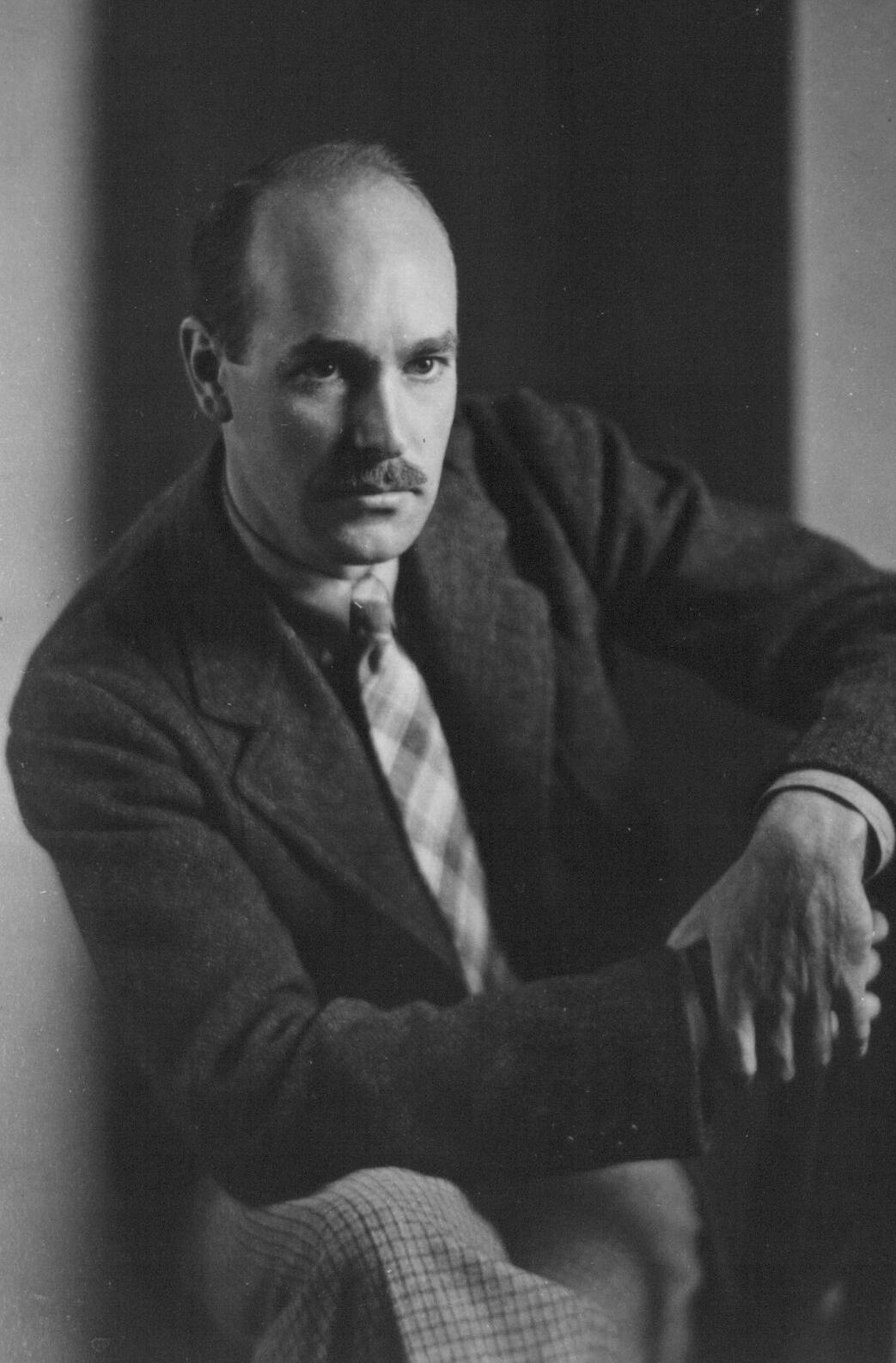
Walter Havighurst

Walter Havighurst, 1994

Walter Edwin Havighurst (November 28, 1901 – February 3, 1994) was an American critic, novelist, and literary and social historian of the Midwest. He was a professor of English at Miami University.

== History ==
The son of Lawrence College professors Freeman Alfred Havighurst and Winifred Weter, Havighurst was born in Appleton, Wisconsin and grew up in the Fox River Valley. Havighurst attended Ohio Wesleyan University, where he earned a bachelor of arts degree, and the University of Denver (1924). He attended King's College London from 1925 to 1926, obtained a bachelor of sacred theology from Boston University in 1928 and a master's degree from Columbia University in 1928. Havighurst was awarded honorary degrees from Lawrence College, Ohio Wesleyan University, Marietta College, and Miami University.

Havighurst joined the faculty of Miami University in Oxford, Ohio in 1928 and served interim terms on the faculties of Connecticut College, the University of Colorado Boulder and the University of British Columbia. In 1968, Miami named him Regents Professor of English Emeritus. He retired as research professor emeritus in 1969. In 1970, the Walter Havighurst Special Collections at Miami University was established and named in his honor.

== Personal life ==
Havighurst married Marion Boyd, a poet and writer, in 1930 and resided in Oxford, Ohio. She died in 1974. He remained in Oxford until the last few years of his life when he moved to Richmond, Indiana to live with relatives, where he died of heart disease.

Havighurst's brother, Robert J. Havighurst, was a professor at the University of Chicago.

== Works ==
Havighurst was the author of over 30 books, including Pier 17 and Annie Oakley of the Wild West. His writing earned awards from the Friends of American Writers, the American Association for State and Local History and the Rockefeller Foundation. River Road to the West received the American History Prize of the Society of Midland Authors.

A major bequest from Havighurst created the Havighurst Center for Russian and Post-Soviet Studies at Miami University upon his death.

== Published books ==
- Pier 17 (Macmillan Co.) (1935)
- The Quiet Shore (Macmillan Co.) (1937)
- The Upper Mississippi (Farrar & Rinehart) (1937) (Volume 2 of the Rivers of America Series)
- The Winds of Spring (Macmillan Co.) (1940)
- No Homeward Course Doubleday, Doran) (1940)
- The Long Ships Passing: The Story of the Great Lakes (Macmillan Co.) (1942)
- High Prairie, Walter and Marion Havighurst, illustrated by Gertrude Howe (Farrar & Rinehart, 1944)
- Land of Promise: The Story of the Northwest Territory (Macmillan Co.) (1946)
- Signature of Time (Macmillan Co.) (1949)
- Song of the Pines: A Story of Norwegian Lumbering in Wisconsin, Walter and Marion Havighurst, illus. Richard Floethe (John C. Winston Co., 1949)
- George Rogers Clark Soldier in the West McGraw Hill) (1952)
- Climb a Lofty Ladder: A Story of Swedish Settlement in Minnesota, Walter and Marion Havighurst, illus. Jill Elgin (Winston, 1952), LCCN 52-5500
- Annie Oakley of the Wild West Macmillan Co.) (1954)
- Wilderness for Sale: The Story of the First Western Land Rush (Hastings House) (1956)
- Buffalo Bill's Great Wild West Show (Random House) (1957)
- Vein of Iron: The Picklands Mather Story (The World Publishing Co.) (1958)
- The Miami Years: 1809-1959] (G. P. Putnam) (1958)
- The First Book of Pioneers: Northwest Territory (Franklin Watts, Inc.)(1959)
- Land of Long Horizons (Coward-McCann, Inc.) (1960)
- The First Book of the Oregon Trail (Franklin Watts, Inc.) (1960)
- The Heartland (Harper) (1962)
- The First Book of The California Gold Rush (Franklin Watts, Inc.) (1962)
- Voices on the River: The Story of the Mississippi Waterways Macmillan Co.) (1964)
- Proud Prisoner: Sir Henry Hamilton (Holt, Rinehart, Winston) (1964)
- Three Flags at the Straits: Forts of Mackinac (Prentice Hall) (1966) (Forts of America Series)
- The Great Lakes Reader (Collier Macmillan) (1966) (Editor)
- Alexander Spotswood: Portrait of a Governor ()Holt, Rinehart, Winston) (1967)
- River to the West: Three Centuries on the Ohio (G.P. Putnam) (1970)
- Men of Old Miami 1809-1873: A Book of Portraits (G. P. Putnam) (1974)
- From Six at First: A History of Phi Delta Theta 1848–1973 (George Banta Co., Inc.) (1975)
- Ohio: A Bicentennial Portrait (Norton) (1976)
- The Dolibois Years (Miami University Alumni Association)(1982)

== References and sources ==
- Eulogy by Phillip R. Shriver
- Dictionary of Midwestern Literature Volume One: General Editor, Philip A. Greasley
