= Song of the Pines =

1949 children's historical novel by Walter and Marion Havighurst

Song of the Pines: A Story of Norwegian Lumbering in Wisconsin
- First edition
- Author: Walter and Marion Havighurst
- Illustrator: Richard Floethe
- Cover artist: Winston
- Language: English
- Genre: Children's literature Adventure
- Publication date: 1949
- Publication place: United States
- Pages: 205

Song of the Pines: A Story of Norwegian Lumbering in Wisconsin is a 1949 children's historical novel written by Walter and Marion Havighurst and illustrated by Richard Floethe. The book was part of the "Land of the Free" series of children's books and highlights the contribution of Norwegian immigrants to the Wisconsin logging industry. The book focuses on 15-year-old orphan Nils, who emigrates to America in the 1850s. Nils is a trained knife sharpener who sets up a business making and selling cant hooks, a traditional logging tool. The novel became a Newbery Honor recipient in 1950.

== Other sources ==
- Schmidt, Gary D. (2013) Making Americans: Children's Literature from 1930 to 1960 (University of Iowa Press) ISBN 9781609382216
- Silvey, Anita (ed) (2002) The Essential Guide to Children's Books and Their Creators (Houghton Mifflin) ISBN 061819083X
