= Eleanor Doorly =

British children's writer (1880–1950)

Victoria Eleanor Louise Doorly (11 January 1880 – 2 May 1950) was a British writer of children's books. For her biography of Marie Curie, The Radium Woman she won the 1939 Carnegie Medal from the Library Association, recognising the year's best children's book by a British subject.

She was born in Richmond Hill, Port Antonio, Jamaica, the daughter of British Army Captain William Anton Doorly and Sarah Louise Brown. She moved to England upon the premature death of her father in 1887. She was raised by a great-aunt in Leamington Spa, Rebecca Boughton, and studied in a French lycée for a while.

Doorly had an enduring love for France, which was reflected in her literary output. She wrote three popular biographies of French scientists –Fabre, Pasteur, and Curie. She also wrote a couple of history books.

She was headmistress of the King's High School For Girls in Warwick from 1922 to 1944. She died 2 May 1950 in Dartmouth, Devon, aged 70.

== Selected works ==
- England in Her Days of Peace (1920)
- The Insect Man (1936), a life of Jean Henri Fabre
- The Microbe Man (1938), on Louis Pasteur
- The Radium Woman (1939), on Marie Curie
- The Story of France (1944)
- Ragamuffin King (1951), a life of Henry of Navarre
