= Eleanor Graham =

British book editor and children's book author

- Born: 9 January 1896; Walthamstow, United Kingdom
- Died: 8 March 1984 (aged 88); London, United Kingdom
- Occupations: writer, book editor
- Writing career
- Genre: children's literature
- Notable work: The Children Who Lived in a Barn
- Notable awards: Eleanor Farjeon Award est. 1966

Eleanor Graham (9 January 1896, in Walthamstow, England – 8 March 1984, in London) was a book editor and children's book author.

She worked for Lady Muriel Paget's aid mission in Czechoslovakia before becoming an editor for publishers Heinemann and Methuen Publishing and a reviewer of children's books at The Sunday Times, among others. During the Second World War, she became editor of Penguin's children's imprint Puffin Books.

After her retirement in 1961, she received the Eleanor Farjeon Award from the Children's Book Circle.

== Early life ==
Graham's father was the editor of Country Life. She moved with her family from Scotland to Essex in 1900. She attended North London Collegiate School.

== Works ==
- The Children Who Lived in a Barn (1938) Reprinted by Persephone Books in 2001
- The Story of Charles Dickens (1952), as part of the Story Biography series
- A Puffin Book of Verse (1953) (anthology)
- The Story of Jesus (1960)
- J. M. Barrie's Peter Pan: The Story of the Play, illustrated by Edward Ardizzone (Brockhampton Press, 1962)
