= Shoestring (disambiguation) =

A shoestring is used to fasten a shoe.

Shoestring may also refer to:

In biology:

- Prairie shoestring, a shrub
- Armillaria ostoyae or shoestring rot, a fungus

In entertainment:

- Shoe String Symphonettes, an album of film music
- Shoestring (TV series)
- Shoestring Radio Theatre

In geography:

- Shoestring annexation, the incorporation of new territory connected to existing territory by only a thin strip of land
- Shoestring Bay, Massachusetts, US
- Shoestring Falls, Washington, US
- Shoestring Glacier, Washington, US
- Shoestring Gorge or Boom Gorge, Kyrgyzstan

In other uses:

- Condor Shoestring, a racing aircraft
- Shoestring necktie, also known as a bolo tie
- Shoestring potatoes, thinly-cut french fries

== See also ==
- Shoe (disambiguation)
- String (disambiguation)
