= Aunt Clara =

Aunt Clara may refer to:

- Aunt Clara (novel), a 1952 novel by Noel Streatfeild
- Aunt Clara (film), a 1954 film starring Margaret Rutherford, based on the Streatfeild novel
- Aunt Clara, fictional character in the John Steinbeck novel Of Mice and Men
- Aunt Clara, fictional character on the American TV show Bewitched played by Marion Lorne
