= A Rush and a Push and the Land Is Ours =

1987 song by The Smiths

Song by The Smiths

from the album Strangeways, Here We Come
- Released: 28 September 1987
- Recorded: March–April 1987
- Studio: The Wool Hall, Beckington, Somerset, UK
- Genre: Alternative rock
- Length: 3:00
- Label: Rough Trade
- Composer: Johnny Marr
- Lyricist: Morrissey
- Producers: Morrissey; Johnny Marr; Stephen Street

"A Rush and a Push and the Land Is Ours" is a 1987 song by English rock band the Smiths, which appeared as the opening track for the band's 1987 final album, Strangeways, Here We Come. Written by Morrissey and Johnny Marr, the song features no guitar and was inspired musically by Reparata's "Shoes" and lyrically by Oscar Wilde's mother, Jane Wilde.

Since its release, "A Rush and a Push and the Land Is Ours" has seen praise from music writers for its enigmatic lyrics, whose meaning is debated, and for its melody. It has also been covered by American progressive metal band Coheed and Cambria.

== Background ==
"A Rush and a Push and the Land Is Ours" represented a conscious decision by Johnny Marr to deviate from the band's recognisable jangle pop sound, in that it featured no guitars at all. Bassist Andy Rourke, reflecting on the song, noted the moment as a "first" for the band. Marr explained:

Before Strangeways was done, for a few months before I really wanted to open the album, however, I was going to do it, with a song with no guitar parts on it…as a challenge and also I was kinda very bored of the whole 'jingle jangle' thing, it seemed like we were being put in that box…so I thought I'd try and sneak on the first track onto the album and see if anyone noticed. And nobody noticed until I told everybody.

Musically, it was inspired by Reparata's song "Shoes", which both Marr and Morrissey were fans of. Marr said, "It was inspired by ['Shoes'], yeah—the bulk of that tune I kind of remembered from being a kid while it was on the English charts. I liked the electric piano—it stuck in my subconscious. It's funny how these things come out."

The song's title is adapted from a line in an editorial, "Jacta Alea Est", written by Oscar Wilde's mother, Jane Wilde, which discussed a republican takeover of Ireland's government. Morrissey took inspiration from his experience as the son of Irish immigrants on the track's lyrics.

== Reception ==
"A Rush and a Push and the Land Is Ours" has seen positive critical reception since its release. Consequence of Sound praised the song's "Vintage, Grade-A, insulting lyrics," while The Vinyl District noted the song's "lovely melody and lots of neat percussion."

PopMatters named the song as the band's ninth best, noting, "the Smiths sound actually menacing" on the song. Rolling Stone ranked the song as the Smiths' 36th best song, while Consequence of Sound named it as the band's 53rd best track.

Comedian Stephen Merchant praised the song, stating that the song "has this electrifying opening; it sort of eases in slowly with this fade and then the guitars [sic] come crashing in. That had the same impact on me as the opening chord to 'A Hard Day's Night.' It just gets into your bones immediately. You hear it and you think, 'This is so incredible. Why have I been deprived of this for so long?'"

== Cover versions ==
American progressive metal band Coheed and Cambria covered the song in 2010, as part of The A.V. Club's A.V. Undercover web series, where bands covered songs off of a list of 25 selected by The A.V. Club. Lead singer Claudio Sanchez reportedly did not know the song well before covering it. Consequence of Sound described their version as "a song that is of equal ferocity as any from their own catalog and an eerily joyous ode to the legendary UK outfit."

American punk rock band Broadway Calls covered the song on their self-titled debut album in 2007.
