= Shoe (disambiguation) =

A shoe is a piece of outerwear worn on one's foot.

Shoe(s) or The Shoe may also refer to:

== Places ==
- The Shoe, a hamlet in Wiltshire, England
- "The Shoe", the nickname for Ohio Stadium, at Ohio State University

== People ==
- "Shoe", nickname of Dan Hsu, former editor-in-chief of the video game magazine Electronic Gaming Monthly
- "Shoe", nickname of Niels Shoe Meulman, visual artist and graffiti writer based in Amsterdam
- "The Shoe", Bill Shoemaker (1931–2003), American jockey

== Art and entertainment ==
=== Films ===
- Shoes (1916 film), directed by Lois Weber
- The Shoe (film), a 1998 German-Latvian drama
- Shoes (2012 film), dedicated to the memory of Holocaust victims

=== Music ===
==== Groups ====
- Shoes (American band), a power pop band active in the 1970s, 1980s, and 1990s
- The Shoes (Dutch band), 1960s
- The Shoes (French band), 2007

==== Works ====
- Shoes (album), by Liam Kyle Sullivan
- "Shoes" (Kelly song), 2006 song and video
- "Shoes" (Reparata song), 1975 single
- "Shoes" (Shania Twain song), 2005 song, originally for Desperate Housewives
- "Shoes", a 1972 song by Brook Benton

=== Television ===
- "Shoe" (Robot Chicken episode)
- "Shoes", an episode of the television show Elmo's World
- "The Shoes" (Seinfeld), a television episode

=== Other uses in art and entertainment ===
- Shoe (cards), a device used to hold multiple decks of playing cards
- Shoe (comic strip)
- "Shoes", a 1907 O Henry short story

== Technology ==
- Shoes (GUI toolkit)
- SHOE, Simple HTML Ontology Extensions, a small set of HTML extensions in the semantic net
- SHOE, Simple Harmonic Oscillator Equation, the basic equation with which repetitive motion can be described
- Brake shoe, a vehicle part
- Contact shoe, a device used on trains to pick up electricity from a third rail

== See also ==
- Ballet shoes (disambiguation)
- Dancing Shoes (disambiguation)
- Shu (disambiguation) (sounds the same)
- Shue (sounds the same), a surname
