= Ballet Shoes =

A ballet shoe is a lightweight shoe designed specifically for ballet dancing.

Ballet Shoes may also refer to:

- Ballet Shoes (film), a 2007 television movie
- Ballet Shoes (novel), a book by Noel Streatfeild
- Ballet Shoes (1975 serial), a 1975 television serial
- "The Ballet Shoe", a 1974 episode of Bagpuss
- Pointe shoes, worn by ballet dancers while performing en pointe
