= Wintle =

Wintle may refer to:

People

- Alfred Wintle (1897–1966), British Army officer
- Frank Wintle (1929–2005), English footballer
- Francis Edward Wintle (known by pen-name Edward Rutherfurd) (born 1948), British novelist
- Jack William Wintle (1908–1942), US Navy officer
- Justin Wintle (born 1939), English writer
- Mary Harriet Wintle (1834–1876), birth name of Australian watercolourist Mary Gedye
- Ryan Wintle (born 1997), English footballer
- Trevor Wintle (born 1940), English rugby union player
- Walter Wintle, American poet

Other

- Characters in Wintle's Wonders (aka Dancing Shoes) by Noel Streatfeild
- USS Wintle (DE-25), US Navy destroyer in World War II
