= Curtain Up (novel) =

1944 novel by Noel Streatfeild

- First edition
- Author: Noel Streatfeild
- Illustrator: D. L. Mays
- Language: English
- Genre: Theatre-fiction
- Publisher: J. M. Dent & Sons
- Publication date: 1944
- Publication place: United Kingdom
- Media type: Print
- Pages: 288 pp

Curtain Up is a children's novel about a theatrical family by British author Noel Streatfeild. It was first published in 1944. To remind potential readers of Streatfeild's highly successful first novel, Ballet Shoes, it is often retitled Theatre Shoes, or Theater Shoes in the US. A number of Streatfeild's children's novels have undergone similar retitling.

== Plot introduction ==
Curtain Up recounts the story of three siblings: Sorrel, Mark, and Holly Forbes. After their widowed father is reported missing during the war, and his father (their grandfather) dies, the children go to live in London with their grandmother on their mother's side, a retired actress. She sends them to the Children's Academy for Dancing and Stage Training, much against their will.

However, it is clear that the stage is in their blood, as they discover talents they never knew they had: Sorrel shines at acting, Mark at singing, and Holly at dancing and impressions.

The book also involves the Fossil sisters from Streatfeild's Ballet Shoes, as each Fossil girl provides each of the Forbes children with a scholarship to cover school expenses. Pauline sponsors Sorrel, Petrova, Mark, and Posy, Holly. The Fossil girls also exchange letters with the Forbes children, although when Miriam, the Forbes' cousin and another student at the school, shows herself to be an exceptionally talented dancer, Posy decides to sponsor her, as well, and to communicate with Miriam instead of with Holly. From these letters we learn that Pauline and Posy have made careers for themselves in Hollywood, after Posy and her teacher had to leave Czechoslovakia due to the war.

== Main Characters ==
Sorrel Forbes - Sorrel is the eldest and has the Warren talent for acting. She normally has her hair in plaits and is determined for Mark to become an admiral. Pauline writes to her after she is given her scholarship. She is a responsible character portraying this throughout looking after her siblings. She did not know she was good at acting but aspires to become an actress by the end of the book. Throughout the story, she often has to compete for parts with her cousin Miranda.

Mark Forbes - Mark is originally reluctant to become a stage performer but shines at singing. He doesn't like it when his family are called "Warren" and defends the Forbes name. By the end of the book, he is heading back to his old boarding school, Wilton House. Petrova writes to him after his sisters are given Fossil scholarships. He aspires to be a sailor as he says that's what his father wanted, he hates singing, in spite his talent, and often asks for money from people if they want him to sing.

Holly Forbes - Holly is the youngest and most childish, and was watched in the hope that she might shine at dancing but it's soon discovered she does not have the talent Posy Fossil was looking for. However, she does have a talent for impressions (something Posy was known for in Ballet Shoes). For part of the book she is jealous of her cousin Miriam's attaché case and goes as far to take one belonging to Miranda, her other cousin, and persuades herself that it was lent. At first Posy writes to her, but stops after Miriam's talent is discovered, though she still gives her a scholarship after Madame asks so she does not hurt Holly's feelings.

== Allusions to other works ==
Although not a true sequel, this novel contains references to the now-adult Fossil girls from Ballet Shoes, and the Forbes children attend the same school.

One of Sorrel's acting roles is Ariel in The Tempest.
