= Captain of Your Ship =

Single by Reparata and the Delrons
- B-side: "Toom Toom (Is a Little Boy)"
- Released: 1968
- Genre: Psychedelic pop
- Length: 2:29
- Label: Bell Records
- Songwriter(s): Kenny Young, Ben Yardley

Performance video
- "Captain of Your Ship" on Beat Club on YouTube

"Captain of Your Ship" is a pop song, first recorded by the US girl group Reparata and the Delrons and released as a single in 1968 by Bell Records. It was written by Kenny Young and Ben Yardley and reached No. 13 on the UK singles chart.

== Background ==
The song is unusual in its atmospheric use of sound effects (foghorn, ship's bell, Morse code) and features psychedelic instrumentation and treatments including electric sitar, backward piano, filtered vocals and phasing. Lead singer Mary Aiese O'Leary told Mojo magazine in May 2008, "I thought it was horrible — the foghorn, the way they had changed my voice with effects. But I grew to like it, and it afforded the opportunity to go over to London ... In America, it fizzled. People in England liked quirkier stuff, and 'Captain of Your Ship' was quirky."

Some sources wrongly credit Lorraine Mazzola with the lead vocal on the recording of "Captain of Your Ship". A filmed live performance from German television, widely available on video sharing websites, shows Mary Aiese singing lead. The confusion may have arisen because Mazzola did become lead singer of the live group the following year, when Mary Aiese took a break from performing live. The filmed performance, with an introduction in German by Dave Lee Travis, appears to be the only existing archive television footage of the group from their 1960s heyday.

The song only made No. 127 in the U.S. national chart, but it became the group's biggest hit when it made No. 13 in the UK singles chart. Following the success of the single, the group toured the United Kingdom, with the backing group Clouds.

Young said of this period: "I accompanied them to Top of the Pops ...[and]...attended the reception for their hit single "Captain of Your Ship", along with John Lennon and Ringo at the Revolution Club in London. I met half the Beatles at our own reception..."

The single had releases in many European countries, as well as Australia and Rhodesia.

The B-side "Toom-Toom is a Little Boy" appears on a rare EP released in pre-revolutionary Iran in 1968, alongside tracks by Dave Dee, Dozy, Beaky, Mick & Tich, Otis Redding and Tommy James.

"Captain of Your Ship" remains a popular oldie in the UK, and it has been re-released there three times. It was first re-released on Bell Records in 1972 to coincide with the release of a new cover version by Reparata of "Octopus's Garden", then again as B-side in January 1985 on the Old Gold label as OG 9504, with the A-side, "Keep On", by Bruce Channel. Most recently, it was included as the B-side on a March 2016 UK re-release of Reparata and the Delrons' "Panic" on the Outta Sight label, which specialises in Northern soul reissues.

== Versions ==
Also in 1968, the JSO (John Schroeder Orchestra) released a version of the song.

The song appeared in the 1990s in an advert for Müller Rice with changed lyrics. In the same year it was sampled in Betty Boo's single, "Doin' the Do".

== Charts ==
Chart (1968)	Peak position
Netherlands (Single Top 100)	17
UK Singles (OCC)	13
