= The Circus Is Coming =

1938 children's novel by Noel Streatfeild

- First edition, 1938
- Author: Noel Streatfeild
- Illustrator: Steven Spurrier
- Language: English
- Genre: Children's novel
- Publisher: J M Dent & Sons
- Publication date: 1938
- Publication place: United Kingdom
- Media type: Print
- Pages: 314 pp
- ISBN: 9990310726

The Circus Is Coming is a children's novel by Noel Streatfeild, about the working life of a travelling circus. It was first published in 1938 with illustrations by Steven Spurrier. For this novel, Streatfeild was awarded the annual Carnegie Medal from the Library Association, recognising the year's outstanding children's book by a British subject. American editions and some later British editions are titled Circus Shoes.

== Plot summary ==
After an unusually sheltered upbringing by their old-fashioned and snobbish aunt, 11-year-old Santa and her 12-year-old brother Peter are faced with the prospect of separate orphanages when she dies. They set out to find their unknown Uncle Gus, who travels with Cob's Circus. They are surprised to find out that he is a clown and a trapeze artist. Gus is taken aback by their sudden appearance and is inclined to send them to the orphanages after all, but he is persuaded to let them stay with the circus for the season. They are fascinated by the life and work hard to fit in, Peter being drawn to the horses and Santa taking up acrobatics. They learn the truth about their family's origins in domestic service, and while it is a shock at first, soon they are glad not to have to live up to their aunt's aristocratic pretensions. They hear many tales of circus life as they travel around the country. At the end of the season, Gus agrees that they have earned a chance to stay with the circus.

== The characters ==
=== The children ===
- Santa and Peter Possit
- Sasha, Olga and Alexsis Petoff
- Fifi Moulin
- Hans and Fritzi Schmidt

=== The adults ===
- Rev Stebbings, Peter's Latin tutor
- Bill, a helpful Londoner

At the circus

- Gus Possit, Auguste and trapezist
- Ted Kenet, Clown and trapezist
- Ben Willis, Master of the Horse (stablemaster)
- Mr Cob, Ringmaster and owner of the circus
- The Petoffs (Liberty horses)
- The Moulins (performing poodles)
- The Schmidts (sea lions)
- Kundra (elephants)
- Satan (lions)

== Illustrations ==
The illustrator Steven Spurrier accompanied Noel Streatfeild in quest of material for the book, travelling with Bertram Mills' Circus. Before the drawings were finalised, Spurrier fell ill, and the book was issued with reproductions of the original sketches, "full of swift and lively observation". The first American edition (1939) was illustrated by Richard Floethe in a striking but more conventional style. Another notable illustrator was Clarke Hutton whose illustrations for the 1947 edition also appeared in the 1956 Puffin Books edition.

== Literary significance and reception ==
John Rowe Townsend describes The Circus Is Coming as Noel Streatfeild's best-known and possibly her best pre-war book. Townsend commends the detailed personal research which gives the book so much authenticity and compares it with Streatfeild's perceptive writing on family, suggesting that the circus is a "super-family". Roger Lancelyn Green mentions the novelistic skill and meticulous accuracy typical of Streatfeild's exceptional career books.

In her biography of the author, Angela Bull notes that while "most reviewers praised it warmly", the Time and Tide reviewer thoroughly disliked Peter and Santa, wishing that Noel had "killed them off, instead of trailing them through the book and nearly spoiling her excellent material".

Noel Streatfeild received the Carnegie Medal for The Circus Is Coming in the award's third year. Her Ballet Shoes had been considered for the medal in the first year, as had Howard Spring's Sampson's Circus. The Circus Is Coming combines the circus setting of Spring's adventure story (which also had illustrations by Spurrier) with the artiste training of Ballet Shoes. It also has main characters of both sexes, like the winner of that first year's medal, Pigeon Post.

Awards
Preceded by The Family from One End Street	Carnegie Medal recipient 1938	Succeeded by The Radium Woman
