= Dancing Shoes =

Dancing Shoes may refer to:

== Music ==
- Dancing Shoes (album), an album by Swedish singer September
- "Dancin' Shoes", a 1978 song by Nigel Olsson
- "Dancing Shoes" (Cliff Richard and the Shadows song), 1963
- "Dancing Shoes", 1921 George and Ira Gershwin song they wrote for A Dangerous Maid
- "Dancing Shoes", a 1977 song by Dan Fogelberg from the album Nether Lands
- "Dancing Shoes", a 1985 song by Seiko Matsuda
- "Dancing Shoes", a 2012 song by Monika Brodka
- "Dancing Shoes", a song by Arctic Monkeys from the 2006 album Whatever People Say I Am, That's What I'm Not
- "Dancing Shoes", a song by Dev from the album The Night the Sun Came Up
- "Dancing Shoes", a song by Gavin DeGraw from Free

== Other uses ==
- Dance shoes, footwear worn by dancers
- Bernard Hartze, a retired South African footballer known as "Dancing Shoes"
- Dancing Shoes (novel), a children's novel by Noel Streatfeild first published as Wintle's Wonders
