= Saplings (novel) =

1945 novel by Noel Streatfeild

- First edition
- Author: Noel Streatfeild
- Language: English
- Publisher: Collins
- Publication date: 1945
- Publication place: United Kingdom
- Media type: Print
- ISBN: 978-1-906462-08-6
- OCLC: 317752268

Saplings is a 1945 adult novel by Noel Streatfeild, published by Collins. It is about a Wiltshire middle-class family living in Regent's Park in pre-Second World War London. With the breakdown of society under German attack, the family undergoes its own rapid disintegration. The novel is written from the perspective of four children – Laurel, Tony, Tuesday, and Kim, as well as from the perspective of their mother, Lena.

Streatfeild mixes fantasy themes of children's books and a more mature psychological realism to show the total damage caused by war.

In 2004, Saplings was adapted into a ten-part radio series on BBC Radio 4. It was also featured on BBC Radio 4's A Good Read in October 2009.

Saplings was republished by Persephone Books in 2000.
