= Reparata and the Delrons =

American girl group (1962–2000)

- Classic line-up, 1965–1969: (l-r) Lorraine Mazzola, Nanette Licari, Mary "Reparata" Aiese

Background information
- Origin: New York City, United States
- Genre: Pop
- Years active: 1962–2000
- Labels: Laurie; World Artists; Stateside; RCA; Mala; Bell; Kapp; Avco Embassy; Big Tree; Dart; North American Music Industries; Polydor; Perfection Sound; Mo-Banana; Ace
- Past members: Reparata (Mary Aiese O'Leary); Nanette Licari; Regina Gallagher; Anne Fitzgerald; Sheila Reilly; Carol Drobnicki (deceased); Kathy Romeo; Marge McGuire; Lorraine Mazzola; Cooky Sirico; Lauren Stich; Judy Jae

Reparata and the Delrons were an American girl group. They are best known for their 1965 recordings "Whenever a Teenager Cries" and "Tommy", for the 1968 European hit "Captain of Your Ship" and for Reparata's 1975 solo hit "Shoes".

== History ==
=== 1962–1965: Early years ===
The group started out as a high-school harmony group formed in 1962 at St. Brendan's Catholic School in Brooklyn, New York by lead singer Mary Aiese. The other original members were Nanette Licari, Regina Gallagher, and Ann Fitzgerald, and the first line up as the Del-Rons featured Mary Aiese, Sheila Reilly, Carol Drobnicki and Kathy Romeo. Romeo was replaced by Marge McGuire, who herself then left the group. All eight girls graduated from St. Brendan's in the class of 1964.

As a trio, Aiese, Reilly, and Drobnicki were spotted by record producers Bill and Steve Jerome. They asked Mary Aiese to choose a stage name to make the group name more interesting and marketable. She chose Reparata, her confirmation name, which she had taken from one of her favorite teachers at Good Shepherd Catholic grammar school.

The Jeromes recorded them in 1964 first for Laurie Records, then on the Pittsburgh-based World Artists label with Ernie Maresca's song "Whenever a Teenager Cries". The song became a regional hit and reached number 60 on the Billboard Hot 100, and it reached the Top 5 in Canada (where it was distributed by Arc). The follow-up, "Tommy", co-written by Chip Taylor, reached number 92. Writing about "Tommy" in her memoir A Misfit's Manifesto: The Spiritual Journey of a Rock-and-Roll Heart (2003), journalist and sociologist Donna Gaines comments:

What better focus for saintly feminine devotion than the sullen "Tommy", who once treated our girl with consideration, respect, and tenderness? But then Tommy starts acting like a dick. Still, she won't give up on him. Her response to his callous indifference is to love him even more. I ached to love a boy like that, only in dreams."

''He's not so sweet and he's far from polite,
Hardly ever calls me

And comes to pick me up late every night.''

The album Whenever a Teenager Cries (1965) showcased the singles, and included covers of popular hits by British Invasion groups including The Beatles' "If I Fell" and Manfred Mann's "Doo Wah Diddy Diddy".

The group opened for The Rolling Stones at the Philadelphia Convention Hall and Civic Center on their Spring 1965 North American tour.

The group became more widely known when they were invited to tour nationally with Dick Clark's Caravan of Stars on two occasions during 1965. Reilly and Drobnicki left the group just before the second tour began, and Reparata performed solo on the tour, with backing vocals from the wings. The next two singles were credited only to Reparata: "A Summer Thought" and "I Found My Place".

=== 1965–1969: Classic line-up, success in Europe ===
When Reparata and the Delrons signed with RCA in 1965, new members were needed. Original member Nanette Licari was brought back. "I Can Tell", the first single for RCA needed a third vocalist, and although it has been reported that Lesley Gore sang on the track, it was actually session singer Lesley Miller, while Gore recorded her own version of the song. 18-year-old Lorraine Mazzola was soon recruited to join the group.

This line-up of Aiese, Licari, and Mazzola became the group's best-known and most prolific, although ironically they never released an album and none of their dozen singles ever made the US national charts. Their 1967 release "It's Waiting There For You" became a minor hit in Colorado Springs, Colorado, with airplay on KYSN, 1460-AM. After several unsuccessful releases in a style similar to the Shangri-Las, including Jeff Barry's "I'm Nobody's Baby Now," and "I Can Hear the Rain" which featured the then-unknown Melba Moore, the group moved again to Mala Records.

In 1968, they released the up-tempo "Captain of Your Ship", co-written by Kenny Young. Although the song missed the U.S. national charts, it became their biggest ever hit when it made number 13 in the UK Singles Chart, and the group toured there. The trio's backing group on this tour was Clouds. "Saturday Night Didn't Happen" and "Weather Forecast" were also issued as singles, but did not repeat the success of "Captain of Your Ship". Young said of this period: '"They were responsible for me moving to England. I accompanied them to Top of the Pops...[and]...attended the reception for their hit single "Captain of Your Ship", along with John Lennon and Ringo at the Revolution Club in London. I met half the Beatles at our own reception...".

"Captain of Your Ship" was popular in many European countries, and was released in Australia and Rhodesia. Footage of the group performing the song live on the Beat-Club show on German television, introduced by Dave Lee Travis is available on video sharing websites. The Beat Club clip shows that Reparata sings lead on the song, not Lorraine Mazzola as reported in some histories of the group. The record's success in Europe led to the group being invited to perform at the Interfestival in Poland in August 1968 alongside British act Julie Driscoll with the Brian Auger Trinity, and Austrian Udo Jürgens as well as acts from Poland, USSR, Yugoslavia and Czechoslovakia.

The B-side "Toom Toom is a Little Boy" gave the group the unusual accolade of a release in pre-revolutionary Iran in 1968, on an EP alongside tracks by Dave Dee, Dozy, Beaky, Mick and Tich, Otis Redding, and Tommy James.

In 1969, the group provided backing vocals for The Rolling Stones' single "Honky Tonk Women", recorded at Olympic Studios in London, and for the Ox-Bow Incident cover of The Four Tops' "Reach Out".

The group filmed a lip-sync performance of their May 1969 single "San Juan" for Hy Lit's show syndicated by WKBS-TV in Philadelphia. A recording of the performance was available on YouTube in March 2021, but it was later removed.

The group's 18th and final single was released in September 1969. A cover of The Ronettes' "Walking in the Rain", its potential to be a hit was challenged when Jay and the Americans released their own version the following month, which reached number 19 in the Billboard charts. The latter group acknowledged the issue by having "Sorry Reparata" etched into the record's vinyl.

=== 1969–1973: Delrons without Reparata ===
Mary Aiese married in 1969. She took her husband's name and became Mary O'Leary. She decided to stop doing live shows and to concentrate on starting a family and on her separate career as a schoolteacher.

Mary O'Leary agreed that Lorraine Mazzola and Nanette Licari would carry on without her doing live shows as The Delrons. They recruited Helaine Tobias, who performed as Cooky, and with Lorraine Mazzola on lead vocals they performed Reparata and the Delrons' back catalogue. The musicians who played with the live group from this time included Dave Camacho (keyboard), Augie Ciulla (drums), Frank Franco (guitar), Frankie Pelligrino (sax) and Cooky's future husband Joe Sirico (bass).

O'Leary had already recorded some lead vocals for the group's second LP, 1970 Rock'n'Roll Revolution, which is a collection of covers of pop standards songs of the 1950s and 1960s, and these tracks were included on the album. The album cover artwork shows the new line-up without Mary O'Leary, and the other band members also took some lead vocals on the album. The vocal arrangements on the album are credited to Lorraine Mazzola.

During her time as lead singer, Lorraine Mazzola began to introduce herself as Reparata. The live shows stopped in 1973 when Mazzola joined Barry Manilow's back-up singers Lady Flash. In Lady Flash, Mazzola began to use the stage name "Reparata Mazzola", and has done so ever since.

Cooky Sirico and Nanette Licari did not continue with the group after Lorraine Mazzola left, and Reparata and the Delrons went on hiatus as a live act in 1973.

=== 1971–1976: Reparata's solo career ===
While The Delrons played live shows without her, Mary O'Leary continued to release new Reparata solo singles produced by Steve and Bill Jerome, who had worked on all the group's records since 1964.

"There's So Little Time" was released as Big Tree 114 in 1971, written by Rupert Holmes and Danny Jordan. The B-side is "Just You" written by the Jeromes and K. Stella.

In February 1972, Mary O'Leary signed a three-year contract with Dart Records, a UK-based label. Dart quickly released "Octopus's Garden" (Dart ART 2006), a cover version of The Beatles song. The recording is credited to Reparata and the Delrons, although only Mary O'Leary is on the recording, not any of the Delrons who were still playing live in the United States at that time. The B-side is "Your Life is Gone", a dramatic story song similar to The Shangri-La's' "Leader of the Pack". In the United States, it was released on Laurie Records, who had released the Delrons first single back in 1964. The production of "Octopus's Garden" uses some vocal effects and sound effects to recapture the quirky mood and sound of the groups' earlier recordings like "Captain of Your Ship" and "Weather Report", and "Your Life is Gone" includes some car-crash and ambulance sound effects like "Leader of the Pack". References to the Beatles and the Shangri-Las, and allusions to the group's own previous hits, seemed dated in 1972, and the record was not a hit.

To capitalize on Reparata's new material for Dart, the group's 1968 UK hit "Captain of Your Ship" / "Toom Toom Is a Little Boy" (Bell Records BL 1252) was rereleased there in July 1972, but it did not make the charts this time.

In 1974, a remake of the group's 1964 hit "Whenever a Teenager Cries" was released as on the North American Music Industries label as NAMI 2024. As ever, it was produced by the Jeromes and arranged by John Abbott. It has a mono recording on one side and a stereo recording on the other. It featured only Reparata, although credited to the group. It may have been the original vocal with an overdubbed country guitar.

On 18 October 1974, Mary O'Leary released a Reparata solo single "Shoes", backed with "A Song for All", as a UK-only promo on Surrey International Records as SIT 5013. Reparata's contract with Dart Records ended in February 1975, and "Shoes" was then given a commercial release on her new label Polydor in the summer of that year. While the single was drawing praise for its catchy and unique sound, promotion and distribution were hampered by two legal disputes.

First, there was a dispute over the name Reparata. Mary O'Leary had used the name since her confirmation as a teenager, and as her stage name since 1964, first as lead singer of Reparata and the Delrons until 1969, then afterwards as a solo performer. Former bandmate Lorraine Mazzola was now also using the name, having taken over from O'Leary as lead singer at live shows between 1969 and 1973. After this line-up disbanded, Mazzola continued to use the name when working as Barry Manilow's back-up singer, benefiting from the impression that Mazzola had been the lead voice of the still fondly-remembered girl group Reparata and the Delrons.

When Mary O'Leary released "Shoes" in 1975, with Mazzola now also singing with as Reparata with Barry Manilow, this caused a problem. In a 2005 radio interview, Mary O'Leary explained that this seriously affected the success of "Shoes" because the record had to be removed from sale during the case: "When the record came out, being done by Reparata, the record was squashed because, quote unquote, Reparata was with Barry Manilow. Believe me, it's a whole big megillah...". O'Leary won the case when Mazzola did not come to the hearing.

Second, and separate from the dispute over the name Reparata, Dart Records disputed Polydor's right to the master tapes of "Shoes", which had been recorded during O'Leary's contract with Dart. This dispute was settled out of court and the single was eventually released on 8 August 1975 on both Dart and Polydor with one catalogue number.

"Shoes" did become a "turntable hit" in both the United States and the United Kingdom. In August 1975 it reached number 92 in the Billboard Hot 100, while in the United Kingdom, it reached number 43 in October 1975. The record's biggest chart success was in South Africa, where it made the Top 10 in early 1976.

After Mary O'Leary won the right to perform as Reparata, Lorraine Mazzola changed her legal given name from Lorraine to Reparata and therefore she could also continue to use the name. This has continued to cause confusion down the years, with Lorraine Mazzola often assumed to be the person who led the group Reparata and the Delrons throughout its recording career, when in fact all recordings feature Mary O'Leary's lead vocal, except for some tracks on "1970 Rock and Roll Revolution" when all group members took turns singing lead.

Some examples of the confusion:

- The Bubblegum Timemachine website says that Mazzola recorded "Shoes" (it was Mary O'Leary).
- An otherwise comprehensive review of the 2005 Best of Reparata and the Delrons compilation says that O'Leary joined Lady Flash (it was Mazzola).

Billboard reported in November 1975 that Mary O'Leary was making a Reparata solo album with the Jeromes and Lou Guarino, for release in early 1976. The album was not released but the version of Bob B. Soxx & the Blue Jeans 1963 hit "Why Do Lovers Break Each Others Hearts" was included on the 2004 Ace Records compilation, Where The Girls Are Volume 6.

From the recordings, the single "Jesabee Lancer (The Belly Dancer)" was released in 1976 on Polydor, number 2058688, in the United Kingdom only. Like "Shoes", it is an Eric Beam song originally recorded by his group Felix Harp in the early 1970s. Their original was called "Savait", and was about Jessica Lancer, not Jesabee Lancer. Also like "Shoes", it has a Middle Eastern or Turkish pop sound which echoes the song's lyrics about a belly dancer. In contrast, the B-side is a religious ballad called "We Need You". The record did not make the UK singles chart, and it has been rarely heard since.

Meanwhile, in March 1976, following the success of "Shoes" in the United Kingdom and capitalising on recent success of a reissue of The Shangri-Las' "Leader of the Pack", Dart Records re-packaged the 1972 single which had featured the Beatles cover "Octopus's Garden" on the A-side, and the Shangri-Las-like "Your Life Is Gone" on the B-side. Dart reversed the A- and B-sides, changed the credit from Reparata and the Delrons to simply Reparata, and assigned a new catalogue number ART 2057.

=== 1978–2000: Reformation, live shows and rereleases ===
The group's album Whenever a Teenager Cries (1965) continued to be sold throughout the 1970s and 1980s. The group's biography on the MTV website comments that the album was

... a low-level collectable piece that was easily found in record store used bins (especially in the northeast) well into the '80s and, in contrast to most other original girl group LPs, only cost $15 to $20. Thus, for 20 years after that album's release, Reparata & the Delrons' music, easier to find and less expensive than, say, originals by the Crystals or Darlene Love, was frequently a first-purchase by lots of people getting into the girl group sound.

In the late 1970s, several of the group's 1960s singles including "Panic" and "It's Waiting There for You" became favourites on the Northern soul scene in England. "Panic" was rereleased in the United Kingdom in 1978 on an EP of Northern Soul classics which also featured tracks by Gerri Granger and James & Bobby Purify.

That same year, Mary O'Leary asked Nanette Licari and Cooky Sirico to reform the group with her. All three were now in their mid-30s, with jobs outside the music industry: O'Leary was a schoolteacher, Licari a cashier at a Brooklyn department store, and Sirico a secretary at a brokerage stock cage. The group became a part-time project for the trio, and they performed approximately once a month on the oldies circuit, and at club gigs and private functions in the New York City and New England areas for over twenty years.

In 1979, the group contributed vocals to Gary Private's EP Private, on the songs "Caught Up In Los Angeles" and "Rumor Has It". Private commented that "my producer Fred Munao knew them from other sessions so we brought them in. I was thrilled as I grew up to their voices.".

In 1981, they released a privately pressed LP called On the Road Again on the Perfection Sound label, and they appeared on Don K. Reed's radio show Doo Wop Shop in 1982 singing a cappella "The Book of Love", "So Young" and "Brooklyn".

"Captain of Your Ship" remained a popular oldie in the United Kingdom, and it was rereleased as a B-side in January 1985 on the Old Gold label as OG 9504, with the A-side "Keep On" by Bruce Channel.

In June 1985, the group joined James Brown and many other 1950s and 1960s artists to record the Roots of Rock 'n' Roll Against Famine charity single "Our Message to the People (For the Children)". It was released in November 1986 and sales benefited the UNICEF World Hunger campaign.

Nanette Licari left the group in 1987 and Lauren Stich took her place. With this line-up, the group made a second appearance on Don K. Reed's Doo Wop Shop in 1988, performing "Boogie Woogie Bugle Boy" and performed as part of the Solid Gold Super Show at Nassau Coliseum in 1987 alongside many recording artists of the 1950s and 1960s.

Mary O'Leary says in a 2016 interview that the live performances of this period were the group's best, especially compared to the hops and club gigs of their early career, when they would either lip sync or work with a house band that was not familiar with their material:

When we started singing again in the 80s and the 90s, we really had a good act.... We rehearsed religiously, we had our own band, we kept with the times in terms of technology and so on, with sound equipment and amplification, and we really put on a really good show.

"Captain of Your Ship" was adapted for a 1990 UK TV commercial for Müllerice, and the same year it was sampled by Betty Boo on her single "Doin' the Do".

In the early 1990s, Lauren Stich left the group and returned to her main careers as a horse-racing journalist and handicapper, and as a talent scout. Judy Jae joined Reparata and Cooky Sirico in what would be the group's final line-up.

A budget Best Of compilation, called Whenever a Teenager Cries like the group's original 1965 LP, was released in 1993 on the Collectable label.

During the 1990s, the group was managed first by Mary O'Leary's husband Jon, then by Vito Picone. The group joined other doo wop groups to record songs for a Christmas compilation. Their version of "Winter Wonderland" is included on the 2010 CD "Christmas Harmonies", and is available via SoundCloud.

In 1996, the group performed on Art Loria's "Twilight Time" cable show on Long Island's TCI cable. Loria was a former member of The Belmonts and The Earls and his variety show featured many groups from the doo-wop era. The clip is available on YouTube. The following year, Ace Records included an unreleased track "Look in My Diary" on the compilation Where the Girls Are, vol. 1.

In 2000, Mary O'Leary retired from teaching and decided it was time to also disband the group for good, almost 40 years after she formed the group as a high school student.

== Legacy ==
Reparata and the Delrons' recordings are regularly featured on compilations of songs by girl groups, 1960s records and Northern Soul favourites. Since 2000, they have been featured on at least 16 such anthologies (see Discography).

In May 2003, Mary O'Leary was a guest speaker at "Italian Americans and Early Rock and Roll", a symposium presented at Queens College, City University of New York by the John D. Calandra Italian American Institute and the university's Newman Center.

Licensing tracks for a Best Of compilation was always going to be logistically difficult. In their twelve-year recording career, Reparata and the Delrons recorded for more than twelve different labels. There had been an unauthorised Best Of compilation in 2001, but it was not until 2005 that an authorised Ace Records compilation The Best of Reparata and the Delrons was released. The compilation included most of the singles, and some rarities, B-sides and unreleased material. It was accompanied by a comprehensive illustrated booklet, with some new commentary by Mary O'Leary.

Also released in 2005, the Rhino Records box set One Kiss Can Lead to Another: Girl Group Sounds - Lost & Found (Rhino R2 74615) featured "I'm Nobody's Baby Now" and "Saturday Night Didn't Happen". Mary O'Leary and Nanette Licari were guests at the album launch at The Cutting Room in New York City. The same month, Mary O'Leary gave an extended radio interview about her career to Alex McNeil, host of the Lost and Found show on the MIT college radio station WMBR.

A Facebook page launched in 2008 as a community for group members, musicians, friends, family and fans. Mary O'Leary was an active participant as are Cooky Sirico, Lauren Stich, Judy Jae and some of the group's musicians. There is also an unofficial MySpace page (/reparatathedelrons).

In summer 2011, Nanette Licari was invited to perform some of the group's songs at the event "She's Got the Power", a celebration of the girl group sound at New York City's Lincoln Center. The supergroup formed for the event continues to perform occasionally as the Super Girls Group in New York and Connecticut, with members of The Chantels, The Toys, The Jaynetts, The Exciters and The Cookies forming a changing line-up at different shows.

The UK Northern Soul record label Outta Sight released "Panic" and "Captain of Your Ship" as a vinyl 45 in March 2016.

Mary O'Leary gave an interview in June 2016 to Arnie Amber on the WMBS show "Oldies Unlimited", where she spoke about her career, her theories about why the group did not make it bigger, and current interest in the group on social media. On their lack of commercial success, she said

"I believe that our follow-up songs in each case were misguided. We had "Whenever a Teenager Cries" and followed it up with "Tommy", which was a very different kind of song. I believe if you have a hit, you have to stick with that feel, that style of song. You can't go off in a completely different direction and expect to have any staying power. At least your second song has to mirror the first. And it was the same thing with "Captain of Your Ship" ... The follow-up should have been a song called "Weather Forecast", which was similar, but instead we came out with "Saturday Night Didn't Happen" ... At the time, we had very little say on what was going to be released."

Mary O'Leary died on 30 November 2024, at the age of 76.

== Discography ==
=== Singles ===
| Year | A-side | B-side | Artist | Label and number | Chart position |
|---|---|---|---|---|---|
| May 64 | Your Big Mistake | Leave Us Alone | The Delrons | (United States) Laurie 3252 | -- |
| (United States) Dec 64 (United Kingdom) (Australia) 29 Jan 65 | Whenever a Teenager Cries | He's My Guy | Reparata and the Delrons with Hash Brown and his Orchestra | (United States) World Artists 1036 (United Kingdom) Stateside SS382 (Australia) Stateside OSS-162 | (United States) number 60 (United Kingdom) (Canada) number 5 |
| (United States) Mar 65 (United Kingdom) (Australia) May /65 | Tommy | Mama Don't Allow | Reparata and the Delrons with Hash Brown and his Orchestra | (United States) World Artists 1051 (United Kingdom) Stateside SS414 (Australia) Stateside OSS-175 | (United States) number 92 (Canada) number 27 |
| 1965 | A Summer Thought | He's the Greatest | Reparata with Hash Brown and his Orchestra | (United States) World Artists 1057 | -- |
| 1965 | I Found My Place | The Boy I Love | Reparata | (United States) World Artists 1062 | -- |
| Dec 65 | I Can Tell | Take a Look Around You | Reparata and the Delrons | (United States) RCA 47-8721 | -- |
| Apr 66 | I'm Nobody's Baby Now | Loneliest Girl in Town | Reparata and the Delrons with Hash Brown and his Orchestra | (United States) RCA 47-8820 | -- |
| Aug 66 | He Don't Want You | Mama's Little Girl | Reparata and the Delrons with Hash Brown and his Orchestra | (United States) RCA 47-8921 | -- |
| Feb 67 | The Kind of Trouble That I Love | Boys and Girls | Reparata and the Delrons | (United States) RCA 47-9123 | -- |
| 1967 | I Can Hear the Rain | Always Waiting | Reparata and the Delrons | (United States) RCA 47-9185, Kapp 1691 (United Kingdom) RCA 1691 | -- |
| Sep 67 | I Believe | It's Waiting There for You | Reparata and the Delrons | (United States) Mala 573 | -- |
| Jan 68 (Australia) May 68 | Captain of Your Ship | Toom Toom (Is a Little Boy) | Reparata and the Delrons | (United States) (Germany) Mala 589 (United Kingdom) (Norway) Bell BLL1002 1 (Netherlands) Stateside HSS-1265 (Australia) Stateside OSS-8333 (Belgium) Stateside RSS-124 (France) Stateside FSS-567 (Netherlands) Stateside HSS 1265 (Sweden) Stateside KSS-1044 (Zimbabwe) Stateside JSS-1172 | (United Kingdom) number 13 (United States) number 127 |
| (United States) May 68 (United Kingdom) 31 May 68 | Saturday Night Didn't Happen | Panic | Reparata and the Delrons | (United Kingdom) Bell BLL 1014 (United States) Mala 12000 (United Kingdom) Bell BLL 1014 (Germany) Bell 12000 | -- |
| (United Kingdom) (France) Jul 68 (United States) 8/68 | Weather Forecast | You Can't Change a Young Boy's Mind | Reparata and the Delrons | (United Kingdom) Bell BLL 1021 (United States) Mala 12016 (France) Stateside FSS 598 (Sweden) Stateside KSS-1048 (Zimbabwe) Stateside JSS-1184 | -- |
| 1968 (Australia) Nov 1968 | Heaven Only Knows | Summer Laughter | Reparata and the Delrons | (United States) Mala 12026 (Australia) Stateside OSS-8558 (Netherlands) Stateside HSS 1315 | -- |
| Apr 69 | (That's What Sends) Men to the Bowery | I've Got An Awful Lot of Losing You to Do | Reparata and the Delrons | (United States) Kapp 989 | -- |
| May 69 | San Juan | Hold the Night | Reparata and the Delrons | (United States) Kapp 2010 | -- |
| Sep 69 | Walking in the Rain | I've Got An Awful Lot of Losing You to Do | Reparata and the Delrons | (United States) Kapp K2050 | -- |
| Apr 71 | There's So Little Time | Just You | Reparata | (United States) Big Tree 114 | -- |
| 28 Apr 72 | Octopus's Garden | Your Life is Gone | Reparata and the Delrons | (United Kingdom) (Netherlands) Dart ART 2006 (New Zealand) Family 1006 (Germany) Odeon/Electrola 1C 006-93 451 (France) Spotlite 40017 (United States) Laurie 3589 (Norway) Philips 6015-056 (France) Spot ST-40017 | -- |
| 21 Jul 72 | Captain of Your Ship | Toom Toom (Is a Little Boy) | Reparata and the Delrons | (United Kingdom) Bell BL1252 | -- |
| 1974 | Whenever a Teenager Cries | Whenever a Teenager Cries | Reparata and the Delrons | (United States) NAMI 2024 | -- |
| 8 Aug 75 | Shoes | A Song for All | Reparata | (United Kingdom) Dart / Polydor; 2066 652 (United States) Polydor 14271 | (United Kingdom) number 43 (United States) number 92 (South Africa) number 6 |
| 27 Feb 76 | Jesabee Lancer (The Belly Dancer) | We Need You | Reparata | (United Kingdom) Polydor 2058688 | -- |
| 6 Feb 76 | Your Life is Gone | Octopus's Garden | Reparata | (United Kingdom) Dart ART 2057 | -- |
| 1976 | Panic | Saturday Night Didn't Happen | Reparata and the Delrons | (United States) Eric Records 5010 | -- |
| 1978 | I Go to Pieces | Panic / Shake a Tail Feather | Gerri Granger, Reparata and the Delrons, James and Bobby Purify | (United Kingdom) Casino Classics CC3 | -- |
| 1980s | Whenever a Teenager Cries | Tommy | Reparata and the Delrons | (United States) Collectables COL 3187 | -- |
| Jan 1985 | Keep On | Captain of Your Ship | Bruce Channel / Reparata and the Delrons | (United Kingdom) Old Gold 9504 | -- |
| Nov 1986 | Our Message to the People (For the Children) (vocal) | Our Message to the People (For the Children) (instrumental) | Roots of Rock'n'Roll Against Famine | (United States) Downtown Records 1003 | -- |
| Mar 2016 | Panic | Captain of Your Ship | Reparata and the Delrons | (United Kingdom) Outta Sight OSV153 | -- |

=== EPs ===
| 1970 | 1971 Rock & Roll Revolution | Reparata and the Delrons | (Mexico) Avco Embassy/Tizoc ED 385 | -- |

The EP includes four tracks from the LP 1970 Rock & Roll Revolution: Please Love Me Forever, To Know Him is to Love Him, Be My Baby and He's So Fine.

=== Albums ===
| Year | Title | Label |
|---|---|---|
| 1965 | Whenever a Teenager Cries | World Artists WAM 2006 |
| 1970 | 1970 Rock and Roll Revolution | Avco Embassy |
| 1981 | On the Road Again | Perfection Sound |
| 1993 | Whenever a Teenager Cries [anthology] | Collectables |
| 2001 | Magical Musical History Tour [anthology] | Mo-Banana 1001 |
| 2005 | Best of Reparata and the Delrons [anthology] | Ace Records |
| 2012 | The Best of Reparata and the Delrons [anthology] | Masters Classics |
| 2023 | Stereo Singles Collection [anthology] | RD(6) (Switzerland) |

=== Compilations ===
This is an incomplete selection of compilation albums and CDs which feature tracks by Reparata and the Delrons, or Reparata solo.

| Year | Title | Track | Label and number |
|---|---|---|---|
| 1969? | Top 4 sampler (Iran) | "Captain of Your Ship" | Top 4 EX-4261 |
| 1975 | 20 Blazing Bullets | "Shoes" | Ronco RTL2012 |
| 1976 | Super Disco | "Shoes" | Polydor 2413 805 |
| 1976 | Disco Explosion Vol. 1 | "Shoes" | Pickwick SHM 903 |
| 1976 | 20 Original Hits. | "Shoes" | Polydor 2413 804 |
| 1976 | Hit Action | "Jesabee Lancer (The Belly Dancer)" | Polydor 2413 306 |
| 1980 | Star Power | "Captain of Your Ship" | Pickwick SSD 8036 |
| 1985 | Stop Look Listen | "Your Big Mistake" | ACT001 |
| 1989 | 20 Collector's Records of the 50s and 60s, Vol. 2 | "Your Big Mistake" | LCD4094 |
| 1991 | The Spirit of the 60s: 1968 - The Hits Don't Stop | "Captain of Your Ship" | TL531/18 |
| 1995 | Early Girls Vol. 1 | "Whenever a Teenager Cries" | CDCHD 608 |
| 1997 | Where the Girls Are Vol 1 | "Look in My Diary" | CDCHD 648 |
| 2000 | Hits Hits Hits 60s 70s | "Captain of Your Ship" | 74321793042 |
| 2000 | The Original Wanderer | "Your Big Mistake" | CDCHD 762 |
| 2004 | 1968 The Soundtrack | "Captain of Your Ship" | |
| 2004 | Where the Girls Are Vol. 6 | "Why Do Lovers Break Each Others Hearts" | CDCHD1032 |
| 2005 | Phil's Spectre II: Another Wall of Soundalikes | "I'm Nobody's Baby Now" | CDCHD 1059 |
| 2005 | One Kiss Can Lead to Another: Girl Group Sounds Lost and Found" | "Saturday Night Didn't Happen", "I'm Nobody's Baby Now" | CDCHD 1229 |
| 14/9/2007 | Testament van den 60s | "Captain of Your Ship" | USM 984 812-8 |
| 15/10/2007 | 100 Hits 60s | "Captain of Your Ship" | Demon DMG 100 001 |
| 2009 | Wild Thing: The Songs of Chip Taylor | "Tommy" | CDCHD 1229 |
| 2009 | The Laurie Records Story Vol. 3: Girls and Girl Groups | "Your Big Mistake", "Your Life is Gone" | CDCHD 1231 |
| 2009 | Northern Soul Movers Vol. 3 | "Panic" | Vintage Saint Records |
| 2009 | 100 Hits: Northern Soul | "Panic" | 100 Hits |
| 2010 | Holiday Harmonies | "Winter Wonderland" | Landlord Records |
| 2011 | The Best of the Northern Soul Story | "Panic" | 88697816382 |
| 2011 | Mad Men | "Doo Wah Diddy" | Golden Lane Records |
| 2011 | Sugar Sugar: The Birth of Bubblegum Pop | "Captain of Your Ship" | Sony TV |
| 2011 | Sounds of the Sixties | "Captain of Your Ship" | EMI TV |
| 2012 | Be My Baby: The Girls of the Sixties | "Captain of Your Ship" | |
| 2015 | Girl Crazy! | "Panic" | Ace Records HIQLP 038 |
| | Rock 'n' Roll | "Lollipop", "Be My Baby" | 86 913 XBT |

== Group member biographies ==
Several of the group's former members and musicians, as well as fans, friends and family, are active on the Reparata and the Delrons Facebook page.

Mary Catherine Aiese (December 31, 1946 – November 30, 2024) formed the group as a high school student in 1962. She led the group throughout its existence, except for 1969–1973 when she stopped performing live, although she continued to record. She married Jonathan (Jon) O'Leary on 29 November 1969 and took his name. The couple had two children Nicole and Jonathan Jr (1973–2022) and they have four grandchildren Analiese, Nicholas, Jonathan III and Ava. Mary taught fifth and sixth grade for 32 years. In 1975, she had a solo hit in the United Kingdom and South Africa with "Shoes". Around this time, she also won a legal dispute with former bandmate Lorraine Mazzola over the right to perform as Reparata. O'Leary reformed the group in 1978 as a part-time project, finally disbanding the group in 2000 when she retired from teaching. She lived in Neponsit, Queens and worked as an estate agent and a personal tutor. On November 29, 2019, she and Jon celebrated their golden wedding anniversary. Jon died on 17 March 2024 and Mary died on 30 November the same year.

Nanette Rosemary Licari, born May 24, 1947, was in the earliest iteration of the group at high school from 1962 to 1963, then she rejoined in 1965. Nanette continued to perform with the group until the late 1980s. During the five-year period when the group was inactive from 1973, she worked as a cashier at a Brooklyn department store. She later became an elementary school teacher and worked at a Catholic school in Brooklyn, from where she is now retired. In summer 2011, she performed at the event "She's Got the Power", a celebration of the girl group sound at New York City's Lincoln Centre. She continues to perform occasionally in the Long Island area as a member of oldies group the Tercels and at nostalgia gigs with other former members of 1960s girl groups. Nanette lives in Ozone Park, Queens with her husband Robert Salerno, where she occasionally makes the local news as a high-profile animal lover and rescuer of stray cats.

Lorraine Marie Mazzola, born February 25, 1947, joined the group in 1965. She became lead singer in 1969 when Mary Aiese decided to stop doing live shows, and informally called herself Reparata. Mazzola left the group in 1973 to form Barry Manilow's backing group Lady Flash, staying with them until 1979. After losing the 1975 court case to Mary O'Leary over the sole right to the stage name Reparata, Mazzola formally changed her given name to Reparata. She co-wrote the book Mafia Kingpin: the True Story of Sonny Gibson (1981), and she wrote and acted in a film with Gibson called Dark Before Dawn (1988). More recently, she has been developing the book into a movie. She was nominated for an Emmy Award as writer-producer of an informational series for WCBS-TV in New York. In May 2001 she pleaded guilty to being involved in a fraudulent investment scheme with Gibson. Mazzola contributed an essay to the book Women's Poker Night (2007), and for five years she was a contributing editor for Poker Pro magazine. She was Events and Operations director for WriteGirl, a programme in creative writing for at-risk young women in Los Angeles She and her partner Chef Gordon Smith published Save the Males: A Kitchen Survival Cookbook in 2013. She lives in Los Angeles and works as a freelance writer, event manager and social media manager.

Cooky Sirico was born Helaine F. Tobias on February 2, 1948 She first became a Delron in 1969 when Mary O'Leary stopped performing live. Originally known by the mononym Cooky, in November 1971 she married the group's bass player Joe Sirico (born 29 November 1946) and took his name. When the live group became inactive in 1973, Cooky became a secretary at a brokerage stock cage. Cooky rejoined the group when they reformed as a part-time project in 1978 and performed with them for the next 22 years until they disbanded in 2000. Cooky and Joe continue to perform in the tri-state area in the oldies groups The BeBops, Johnny and the Raybands, and Just Friends. Cooky also performs with The Remnants and with Witness, and Joe plays with the Brooklyn Keys. Cooky and Joe have two adult daughters, Jackie and Stephanie.

Carol Dorothy Drobnicki (February 13, 1947 - c19 December 1980) was in the group 1962–1964. She married Frank Barsh in September 1965, and later remarried and was known as Carol Scordilis. She died from cancer at the age of 33.

Sheila Anne Reilly was a Delron from 1963 to 1965. She became a teacher, and taught at St. Thomas Aquinas School in Brooklyn. She later moved to Seattle, Washington and became a school principal.

Judy Jae was in the final line-up from 1992 to 2000. She went on to record four CDs of original country-crossover material in Nashville, and continues to perform in Manhattan and on Long Island, and to write music under the name Judy Rae Jae.

Lauren S. Stich was born on December 25, 1951. She joined the group for a year in the late 1980s. Lauren continues to sing occasionally, but works more behind the scenes as the founder and director of a talent agency. Lauren also has a separate career as a respected writer on horse racing, and she also breeds horses. She wrote a weekly column for the Daily Racing Form and is now a racing handicapper and analyst for the Racing Digest. Lauren lives in Las Vegas.

Katherine Ann Romeo (b. 14 October 1946) was in the group from 1962 to 1963. She still lives in Brooklyn. She is a widow with two grandchildren.

Regina Marie Gallagher (April 24, 1947 - September 24, 2024) was in the group from 1962 to 1963. She subsequently had a 30-year career as a nurse. Her married name was McGowan.

Anne Frances Fitzgerald was in the group from 1962 to 1963, and Marguerite Frances McGuire was a member from 1963 to 1965.

Drummer Augie Ciulla recorded with his nephews' band The Infinite Staircase, and was featured on their debut album The Road Less Taken, which was released in early 2009. Keyboard player Dave Camacho performs with the Borinquen Blues Band.

== Bibliography ==
- Clemente, John (2000). Girl Groups—Fabulous Females That Rocked The World. Iola, Wisc. Krause Publications. pp. 276. ISBN 0-87341-816-6.
- Clemente, John (2013). Girl Groups—Fabulous Females Who Rocked The World. Bloomington, IN Authorhouse Publications. pp. 623. ISBN 978-1-4772-7633-4 (sc); ISBN 978-1-4772-8128-4 (e).
