= The Painted Garden =

1949 novel by Noel Streatfeild

- First hardback edition, 1949
- Author: Noel Streatfeild
- Illustrator: Ley Kenyon
- Language: English
- Genre: Children's novel
- Publisher: Collins
- Publication date: 1949
- Publication place: United Kingdom
- Media type: Print
- Pages: 320
- ISBN: 0-00-710020-5 (2000 edition)

The Painted Garden is a children's novel by British author Noel Streatfeild. It was first published in serial form in 1948, and as a book (subtitled The Story of a Holiday in Hollywood) in 1949. The abridged US edition was entitled Movie Shoes. The novel is now out of print, the most recent publication being the 2000 Collins paperback.

== Plot summary ==
Crabby Jane Winter is furious when her family plans to spend the winter in California, leaving her dog in London. However, her father really needs a holiday to get over his writer's block. In California, Jane meets a movie producer who realises that her disposition makes her perfect to play Mary in a film version of The Secret Garden. The novel shows the process of filmmaking from a child actor's perspective. The novel also involves Jane's siblings: Rachel the budding ballerina and Tim the promising pianist, who have their own adventures in California. But the plain and unnoticed Jane is the one who makes it to fame.

== Background ==
Noel Streatfeild visited America in 1947, travelling by sea to New York, then overland to California, as the Winters did in the novel. She visited film studios in Hollywood, and spent several weeks observing the making of The Secret Garden, paying particular attention to the child stars Margaret O'Brien, Dean Stockwell and Brian Roper.

== Publication history ==
The novel first appeared in 1948 in Collins Magazine for Boys & Girls, with illustrations by Marcia Lane Foster, and the serial was republished in Collins Magazine Annual for Boys & Girls in 1953. The novel was published as a hardback book in 1949, illustrated by Ley Kenyon. An abridged version illustrated by Susanne Suba was published in the US by Random House also in 1949, under the title Movie Shoes. The first UK paperback edition was published in 1961, somewhat revised and with illustrations by Shirley Hughes.
