= White Boots =

1951 novel by Noel Streatfeild

- First edition
- Author: Noel Streatfeild
- Illustrator: Milein Cosman
- Language: English
- Genre: Children's novel
- Publisher: Collins
- Publication date: 1951
- Publication place: United Kingdom
- Media type: Print
- Pages: 249 pp

White Boots is a children's novel by Noel Streatfeild. It was first published by Collins publishers in 1951. The book was published under the title Skating Shoes in the US, also in 1951. White Boots tells the story of a poor girl and a rich girl who meet as a result of figure skating and is the tale of their unlikely friendship.

== Plot summary ==
Harriet Johnson has been ill and her doctor arranges for her to take up ice skating in order to build strength in her legs. When she gets to the rink Harriet meets Lalla Moore, a young skater who has been training since she was three years old; Lalla's parents were killed in a skating accident, and her Aunt Claudia is determined that Lalla will be the greatest figure skater in the world. Harriet and Lalla soon become friends and as Harriet is still not well enough for school, it is arranged that she will share Lalla's governess and her various dance and fencing lessons.

Harriet soon shows herself to be a talented skater, and she starts to take, and pass, the same skating tests that Lalla does. Lalla, on the other hand, is much more of a performer than a figure skater and starts to have trouble with various figures she needs to learn for tests. Lalla becomes jealous of Harriet and tells her that if she takes and passes her next skating test, Lalla will tell her aunt that she does not want Harriet to have lessons with her any more. Distraught, Harriet pretends to once again be ill while she decides what to do. But when Lalla hears that Harriet is seriously ill, she faints and later explains how nervous, miserable and guilty she feels. Lalla and Harriet go for a holiday together with their families and they talk about their futures. Lalla's coach tells her that she will never be a good enough figure skater to succeed in competitions, but that she could be a fantastic show skater and performer; whereas Harriet has potential to be a great skater one day, as she is better at the figures required to do well.

== Short stories ==
There are more short stories that Noel Streatfeild wrote including the characters from White Boots:

- "The Skaters" is a short story about Harriet and Lalla, set three years after the conclusion of White Boots. It appeared in the 1955 BBC Children's Annual.
- Another short story, "Ordinary Me", features Harriet and Lalla, and Max Lindblom makes a brief appearance. It appeared in Noel Streatfeild's Ballet Annual of 1959. This story was re-printed as part of a collection, titled Noel Streatfeild's Holiday Stories, published by Virago Press in 2019.
- Max Lindblom is also mentioned in the short story "Skating to the Stars", which appeared in the 1952 Daily Mail Annual for Boys and Girls.

== Character list ==
- Harriet Johnson
- Mr. George Johnson
- Mrs. Olivia Johnson
- Toby Johnson
- Alec Johnson
- Edward Johnson
- Lalla Moore
- Aunt Claudia
- Uncle David
- Nana (Lalla's Nurse)
- Miss "Goldie" Goldthorpe (Lalla's Governess)
- Max Lindblom (ice skating teacher)
