= Ruth Gervis =

British illustrator

- Born: Ruth Streatfield; 13 August 1894; Frant, United Kingdom
- Died: 26 October 1988 (aged 94); Oxford, United Kingdom
- Known for: Illustration
- Spouse: Shorland Gervis
- Father: William Streatfeild
- Relatives: Noel Streatfeild (sister)

Ruth Gervis (13 August 1894 – 26 October 1988) was a British illustrator. Together with her sister Noel Streatfeild she illustrated the 1936 book Ballet Shoes. Her other book illustrations include The Buttercup Farm Family, The Pole Star Family, The Saucy Jane Family and The Very Big Secret.

== Biography ==
Gervis was born to William Streatfeild and Janet Venn and was the eldest sister of Noel Streatfeild. Ruth suffered from asthma and was sent to live for four years with her Streatfeild grandparents where she was looked after by a nurse, rather than stay in the damp Amberley Vicarage. In 1902 when her parents moved to St Leonards-on-Sea, she was able to return to the family home. There, she also attended the Hastings College and St Leonard's College and Laleham school in Eastbourne. Before World War I, in 1911 her family relocated again while she herself was hired as a nurse during the war and also helped produce two plays called Vingt-en-Un and When Daydreams End with her sister Noel in 1915.

After the war Gervis continued teaching and exhibited widely and then took over the studio and pupils of her original teacher, Miss McMunn. She married Shorland Gervis (known as Shor) who a science master at the Boys' School in Sherborne, where they lived together at Nortons, The Avenue. She continued children's art classes at home and also took ladies sketching. Ruth became more widely known as a successful illustrator of children's books such as those by Paula Harris, Mary Treadgold, Kitty Barne and the Caravan Family series by Enid Blyton. She seized the chance of illustrating Noel Streatfeild's book Ballet Shoes in 1936 when Mabel Carey, children's editor for Dent and Sons Publishers, suggested she might be suitable without realising she was in fact Noel's older sister. The book is still in print although Gervis's drawings now appear only in the Puffin paperback; the originals are held by the Centre for the Children's Book. She is also known for her other book illustrations such as The Buttercup Farm Family, The Pole Star Family, The Saucy Jane Family and The Very Big Secret.

In 1931 Gervis became a founder member of Sherborne art club and later its Chairman and President. In 1941 she was asked to teach the art at Sherborne School as the art master was ill; he subsequently died and by 1941 she was in charge of the art department where she remained until 1953. She moved to a similar post at Lord Digby's school in 1953 until she retired in 1966.

After her husband Shor died in 1968, Gervis became a founder member of the Museum at Sherborne, participating on its Council and taking a supporting role for twenty years. In 1988 when ill health became a problem, she moved to Oxford to be near her daughter, but died only a few days after moving into St. Luke's nursing home.

The museum in Sherborne still holds a variety of examples of her artwork, both in the public gallery and the reserve collection. One box of archive materials for Gervis's work is held by Seven Stories Archive.
