= Aunt Clara (novel) =

1952 novel

- Author: Noel Streatfeild
- Language: English
- Genre: Comedy drama
- Publisher: Collins
- Publication date: 1952
- Publication place: United Kingdom
- Media type: Print

Aunt Clara is a 1952 comedy novel by the British writer Noel Streatfeild. It concerns a respectable elderly woman who inherits her relative's estate which proves to include a greyhound and a brothel. Although her more worldly relatives expect her to struggle, she proves equal to the task.

== Film adaptation ==
In 1954, it was adapted into a British film of the same title directed by Anthony Kimmins and starring Ronald Shiner, Margaret Rutherford and A. E. Matthews.

== Bibliography ==
- Goble, Alan. The Complete Index to Literary Sources in Film. Walter de Gruyter, 1999.
- Hettinga, Donald R. & Schmidt, Gary D. British Children's Writers, 1914–1960. Gale Research, 1996.
