= USS Wintle (DE-25) =

Evarts-class destroyer escort

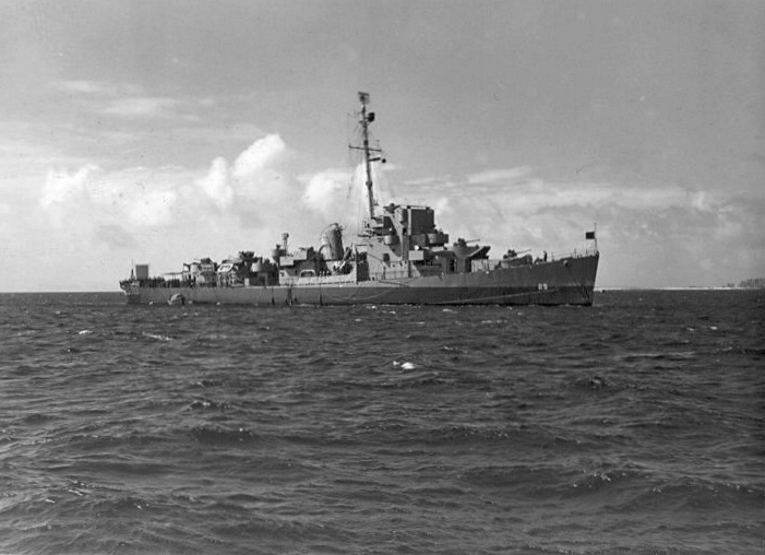
- Wintle c. 1945

History

United States
- Name: USS Wintle
- Builder: Mare Island Navy Yard
- Laid down: 1 October 1942
- Launched: 18 February 1943
- Commissioned: 10 July 1943
- Decommissioned: 14 November 1945
- Stricken: 28 November 1945
- Honors and awards: 3 battle stars (World War II)
- Fate: Sold for scrapping, 25 August 1947

General characteristics
- Type: Evarts-class destroyer escort
- Displacement: 1,140 long tons (1,158 t) standard; 1,430 long tons (1,453 t) full
- Length: 289 ft 5 in (88.21 m) o/a; 283 ft 6 in (86.41 m) w/l
- Beam: 35 ft (11 m)
- Draft: 11 ft (3.4 m) (max)
- Propulsion: 4 × General Motors Model 16-278A diesel engines with electric drive, 6,000 shp (4,474 kW); 2 screws
- Speed: 19 knots (35 km/h; 22 mph)
- Range: 4,150 nmi (7,690 km)
- Complement: 15 officers and 183 enlisted
- Armament: 3 × single 3"/50 Mk.22 dual-purpose guns; 1 × quad 1.1"/75 Mk.2 AA gun; 9 × 20 mm Mk.4 AA guns; 1 × Hedgehog Projector Mk.10 (144 rounds); 8 × Mk.6 depth charge projectors; 2 × Mk.9 depth charge tracks

USS Wintle (DE-25) was an Evarts-class destroyer escort constructed for the United States Navy during World War II. The ship was promptly sent off into the Pacific Ocean to protect convoys and other ships from Japanese submarines and fighter aircraft. By the time she returned to the United States at the end of the war she had been awarded three battle stars.

== Design ==
The Evarts-class destroyer escorts were 289 ft 5 in (88.21 m) long overall, and they had a beam of 35 ft 2 in (10.72 m). They had an average draft of 10 ft 1 in (3.07 m) at their full load displacement of 1,416 long tons (1,439 t). Each ship had a normal crew numbered 156 officers and sailors.

Wintle was propelled by a pair of diesel motors manufactured by General Motors, which drove a pair of screw propellers. Her propulsion system was rated to produce 6,000 brake horsepower (4,500 kW) for a top speed of 19.5 knots (36.1 km/h; 22.4 mph). Oil storage amounted to between 131 and 197 long tons (133 and 200 t), which allowed a cruising radius of up to 6,000 nautical miles (11,000 km; 6,900 mi) at an economical pace of 10 knots (19 km/h; 12 mph).

The ship's armament consisted of a main battery of three 3-inch (76 mm) /50-caliber guns in individual pivot mounts, which could be used against air or surface targets. These were supported by a light anti-aircraft battery that initially consisted of four 1.1 in (28 mm) /75-caliber guns in a quadruple mount and nine 20 mm (0.79 in) Oerlikon guns. For attacks against submarines, the ship was equipped with a Hedgehog mortar, eight depth charge throwers, and two depth charge racks.

== Construction and commissioning ==
Wintle was laid down on 1 October 1942 at the Mare Island Navy Yard as BDE-25, one of the destroyer escorts allocated to the Royal Navy under the lend-lease program. The ship was launched on 18 February 1943. She was reallocated to the United States Navy on 4 June 1943 and was named Wintle on 14 June 1943 after Jack Wintle, a naval officer killed aboard USS San Francisco at the Battle of Savo Island. The ship was commissioned on 10 July 1943.

== World War II Pacific Theater operations ==
Wintle completed shakedown training in late July and early August and returned to the Mare Island Navy Yard for post-shakedown repairs. On 21 September, she put to sea with a Hawaii-bound convoy and arrived at Pearl Harbor on 8 October. She departed Oahu, Hawaii, almost immediately to return home in the screen of another convoy on 17 October. On the 25th, the destroyer escort stood out of San Francisco Bay in the screen, built around Breton (CVE-23), for a convoy bound, via Pearl Harbor, to Viti Levu in the Fiji Islands. She delivered her charges at Nandi Harbor on 14 November and, after a three-day stopover, departed Viti Levu on 17 November to escort Neshanic (AO-71) to Funafuti in the Ellice Islands. She stopped there for two days before returning to sea on the 21st to escort Tallulah (AO-50) to a fueling rendezvous. When she returned to Funafuti the following day, "Operation Galvanic", the Gilbert Islands invasion, was well underway. All the destroyer escort's recent movements and those she made over the following fortnight were undertaken to support the warships participating in that campaign. On 8 December, Wintle completed her labors in behalf of "Galvanic" and set a course for Funafuti where she stopped between 9 and 12 December before continuing on toward Oahu in the screen for a convoy.

== Wintle involved in collision ==
The warship arrived in Pearl Harbor on 21 December. After several days in port, she began battle practice training in the Hawaiian operating area. On 3 January 1944, Wintle and Dempsey (DE-26) came alongside one another to practice fueling at sea. After transferring about 1,000 gallons of fuel to Wintle, Dempsey prepared to leave. Suddenly, she rammed Wintle on her starboard side. Her anchor ripped open Wintle's starboard side from the lower platform deck to the main deck at frame 40. Dempsey's anchor also broke Wintle's degaussing coil and severed her return steam line. In her haste to change course, Dempsey swerved sharply, colliding with Wintle again, this time stern to stern, crushing Wintle's propeller guard against her hull. The damaged destroyer escort's repair party quickly stuffed mattresses into the breach in her hull and shored them up as best they could to prevent serious flooding. Wintle was able to make 10 knots without shipping too much water and reached Pearl Harbor the following morning to begin repairs. She completed repairs rapidly and returned to sea to resume exercises on 11 January.

== Supporting the invasion of the Marshall Islands ==
Ten days later, Wintle received orders assigning her to the 5th Amphibious Force for "Operation Flintlock", the invasion of the Marshall Islands. She departed Pearl Harbor that same day escorting four tank landing ships to Majuro. Wintle and her charges reached that atoll on 1 February to find that the American force had taken it without opposition the previous day. The destroyer escort led the patrol of the entrance of the lagoon on the 2nd, then met Caliente (AO-53) at sea, and escorted her into the lagoon on the 3rd. She then resumed anti-submarine warfare (ASW) patrol off Majuro and continued the task for the next six days. On the 9th and 10th, she escorted Sangay (AE-10) to Kwajalein, then headed back to Pearl Harbor, where she arrived on the 23rd. Wintle remained in the Hawaiian Islands until 2 March, when she got underway with Stadtfeld (DE-29) to escort a three-ship convoy to the Gilberts. They saw their charges safely to the Gilberts on 11 March and got underway the following day for the Solomons. Proceeding via Funafuti, the two destroyer escorts arrived off Lunga Point, Guadalcanal, on 18 March and reported for duty with the 3rd Fleet. For the next six months, Wintle crisscrossed the Southwest Pacific escorting tankers, transports, and cargo-men to and from various American bases, most frequently between the Solomons and the Admiralty Islands. When not engaged in escort missions, she honed her ASW skills during exercises with American submarines.

On 19 September, she arrived at Manus Island concluding her last Solomons-Admiralties run. On the 22d, she headed out of Seeadler Harbor for a new theater, the Palau Islands in the Central Pacific. The warship arrived in the anchorage at Kossol Passage three days later. Her stay proved brief because she set course back to Manus that same day. She reached Seeadler Harbor on 5 October and, after a brief availability alongside Piedmont (AD-17), headed back to the Palaus where she arrived on 15 October. During the following month, Wintle performed patrol and escort duties in the Palaus. On 10 November, she relieved Buchanan (DD-484) off Denges Passage and fired star shells over the passage and nearby Ngeregong Island in support of troops embarked in landing craft patrolling against the possibility of enemy reinforcements reaching Peleliu from Ngeregong. That duty lasted until 12 November when she left station to assist PC-1260, damaged in a collision with Kenmore (AK-221).

== Operating on the Saipan Patrol ==
The destroyer escort exited Kossol Passage on 18 November and steamed via Ulithi to the Marianas. She entered Apra Harbor, Guam, on the 28th and became a unit of the Saipan Patrol and Escort Force. For about 12 weeks, the warship patrolled the Marianas, primarily between Guam and Saipan. On Christmas night, she helped to repulse a Japanese air raid on U.S. Army Air Force installations ashore on Saipan. Two days later, she rescued three survivors from a B-29 bomber that crashed near Nafutan Point. After the excitement of late December, January 1945 was uneventful except for two round-trip voyages to Eniwetok and back.

On 5 February 1945, she received orders transferring her to the Marshalls-Gilberts Escort Force. She arrived at Eniwetok on 10 February and began duty escorting convoys from bases in the Marshalls and Gilberts to forward areas. She made frequent voyages between Guam, Kwajalein, and Eniwetok and cruised with a hunter-killer group in search of Japanese submarines reportedly operating in the Marshalls. On the night of 2 April, Wintle exchanged gunfire with Japanese shore batteries on bypassed Wotje Atoll after they opened fire on her while she hunted for a midget submarine. During American air strikes on enemy-held Mili, Jaluit, and Wotje in late April and early May, Wintle provided air-sea rescue services; but, fortunately, no aviator needed her assistance. On the night of 5 and 6 May, she covered the evacuation of natives from Japanese-held Jaluit Atoll. On 13 May, Wintle departed Eniwetok to screen two merchant ships on a voyage to the Palaus.

Wintle arrived in Kossol Passage on the 18th and, two days later, headed for Ulithi. There, she joined two ships damaged at Okinawa, Hazelwood (DD-531) and Rathburne (APD-25), and escorted them on the Ulithi-to-Eniwetok leg of their voyage home. The ships departed Ulithi on 25 May and made Eniwetok on the 29th. There, the destroyer escort resumed patrol and escort duties with the Marshalls-Gilberts Escort Force which she continued to perform until mid-June.

== Antisubmarine patrol operations ==
On 17 June, Wintle and Levy (DE-162) stood out of Eniwetok to take up ASW station on the shipping lanes between Eniwetok and the Marianas. The next day, she responded to a report that Endymion (ARL-9) had been torpedoed but, upon reaching the repair ship, found no submarine to attack. After an unsuccessful search, she headed back to Eniwetok. The warship continued intermittent patrols until 1 July when she put to sea from Eniwetok lagoon to rendezvous with a hunter-killer group built around Kassan Bay (CVE-69). She searched for Japanese submarines along the Eniwetok-Marianas shipping lanes until relieved by Snyder (DE-745) on 8 July. Wintle returned to Eniwetok where she took on fuel and supplies in preparation for the long voyage back to the United States. The destroyer escort exited the lagoon on 12 July, visited Pearl Harbor on the 18th and 19th, and entered San Francisco Bay on the 26th.

== Post-War activity ==
The ship unloaded ammunition at the Mare Island Navy Yard and entered Hunters Point, California, for repairs that same day. She was in drydock on 15 August when news of the Japanese capitulation arrived; and, on the 18th, most work ceased. Finally, on 15 November 1945, Wintle was placed out of commission and was berthed at Mare Island, California. On 28 November 1945, her name was struck from the Navy List. The former warship was sold for scrap to the Union Minerals & Alloys Corporation on 25 August 1947.

== Awards ==
- Combat Action Ribbon (retroactive)
- American Campaign Medal
- Asiatic–Pacific Campaign Medal (with three service stars)
- World War II Victory Medal
