= Wintle's Wonders =

1957 children's novel by Noel Streatfeild

- First edition cover
- Author: Noel Streatfeild
- Illustrator: Richard Kennedy (UK); Richard Floethe (US)
- Language: English
- Genre: Children's novel
- Publisher: Collins
- Publication date: 1957
- Publication place: United Kingdom
- Pages: 256 pp
- ISBN: 978-0-340-62663-4

Wintle's Wonders is a children's novel about a theatrical troupe by Noel Streatfeild. It was first published in 1957, and in 1958 was published in the US as Dancing Shoes, a title which has also been used in more recent UK editions. A number of Streatfeild's children's novels have undergone similar retitling, linking them to her most successful book, Ballet Shoes. Wintle's Wonders draws on the author's own acting experience, and revisits the type of theatrical establishment seen in her adult novels The Whicharts and It Pays to be Good.

== Plot summary ==
As the book begins, Rachel Lennox and her adopted sister Hilary are living with Rachel's mother. Rachel's father, George Lennox, was a budding film star, but died just as his career was taking off, when the children were seven. As a result, the family is not well off; they must take in boarders to make ends meet. Hilary's mother was a dancer, and so Rachel and her mother are determined that Hilary will also become a ballerina. Hilary does have a talent for ballet, but is not at all interested in it.

Their mother dies when the girls are ten, just before Hilary's audition for the Royal Ballet School, and the girls go to live with their Uncle Tom (their father's brother), his wife Cora Wintle, and their daughter, Dulcie. Aunt Cora runs a dancing school to teach girls how to perform in troupes for pantomimes, musicals and reviews; the troupes are referred to as "Mrs Wintle's Little Wonders". Dulcie, who is almost a year older than Rachel and Hilary, is very attractive and a talented dancer, but also very spoiled by her mother.

Mrs Wintle originally intends to take only Rachel, as she is a blood relative, but she decides to keep Hilary also, when she realises how talented a dancer Hilary is. Rachel is horrified by the type of dancing taught at Mrs Wintle's school, which includes tap, musical comedy, and acrobatics, and remains determined that Hilary will continue with her ballet. Rachel must also train as a Little Wonder, and though she works hard, she has no talent for the dancing required of the "Wonders". However she does excel in ordinary lessons, and at their additional elocution and acting lessons, which puts her in competition with her cousin Dulcie without it coming to light for most of the book. Mrs Storm, their tutor, decides to teach Rachel extra elocution, because it makes her happy. Hilary continues dancing and throughout the book enjoys acrobatics in particular. Although Rachel bribes her with money to finish ballet, which seems to work Hilary also continues to excel at acrobatics. This continually makes Rachel upset.

Rachel discovers that when she is fifteen, she may be allowed to train for something else; this excites her, and she vows to send Hilary to the Royal Ballet School as soon as she can. In the meantime she works hard in her own dancing, but she is still disliked by her aunt as she is not enthusiastic and even her best efforts do not make her, though competent, a good dancer. Dulcie, meanwhile, gains a license to work as soon as she is twelve and immediately stars in a continuous line of pantomime, television and musicals. This gives her an air of unbearable conceit, and she goes through a phase of thinking nobody can dance, act or sing better than she can. Rachel soon follows, and is very much the opposite; she hates being onstage and is happy to be an understudy, and detests her uncomfortable Wonder uniform. Hilary gains a job as Dulcie's understudy, and it is clear that she rivals Dulcie as both an actress and dancer and outshines her completely in comedic value. This begins to scare Dulcie, who wonders if her position as a star is as stable as she believed. However, Hilary is unlike Dulcie in that although she loves dancing, she is lazy and dislikes putting great effort into anything.

Contributing to Dulcie's worries, for a while she is out of work, having previously been in high demand in the showbusiness world. However, an offer for a film soon comes up, and Dulcie is immediately put forward for the role; she desperately wants a film contract as hit would secure her a reputation as a star of stage and screen while still a child. Mrs Wintle is sure that her daughter will get it, saying that she sees her name in big electric lights. Dulcie goes for her film test, but clearly is not what the director is looking for. He is at a loss, as Dulcie is a pretty child and a talented actress, but cannot feel a role, as is required for the film. As it happens, Rachel has come to the film test, having had nothing better to do, and is reading when the director sees her and realising that she has the face he has been searching for, and her talent for acting, nurtured by Mrs Storm, comes to light: Rachel walks out with a film contract, and Dulcie with nothing, leaving Mrs Wintle furious with Mrs Storm for giving Rachel acting lessons behind her back; however she can do nothing. As a final attempt, Rachel considers spending the money she will make on sending Hilary to the Royal Ballet school straight away instead of when she turns fifteen, as Hilary tells her that she won't go near the place, and gently adds that it would be pointless to make her do something that does not inspire her at all, Rachel gives up on Hilary as she looks forward to her own, glittering future.

== Main characters ==
Rachel Lennox is the daughter of actor George Lennox and his wife. A serious-minded child, she tries to take responsibility for herself and her adopted sister Hilary after they are orphaned.

Hilary Lennox is Rachel's adopted sister; the two are very close. Though Rachel wants Hilary to become a ballerina like Hilary's birth mother, Hilary prefers tap dance, acrobatics, and musical comedy.

=== The Wintles ===
Cora Wintle is Rachel and Hilary's aunt, a former dancer who now runs a dance academy.

Tom Lennox is Cora's husband, a painter who does not take much interest in dance. He becomes Rachel's friend and protector.

Dulcie Wintle is Cora and Tom's daughter, a talented but proud and snobbish dancer. She is jealous of Hilary, and detests Rachel.

=== People in school ===
Mrs Purser, known as Pursie, is the costumer and housekeeper at Mrs Wintle's school.

Mrs Storm is Dulcie, Rachel, and Hilary's schoolteacher, who introduces Rachel to elocution and acting.

Pat and Ena are dance teachers at Mrs Wintle's school.

Yolanda and Wanda are chefs at Mrs Wintle's school.
