= Aunt Clara (film) =

1954 British film by Anthony Kimmins

- UK theatrical poster
- Directed by: Anthony Kimmins
- Written by: Kenneth Horne
- Based on: Aunt Clara by Noel Streatfeild
- Produced by: Colin Lesslie; Anthony Kimmins
- Starring: Ronald Shiner; Margaret Rutherford; A. E. Matthews; Fay Compton
- Cinematography: C. M. Pennington-Richards
- Edited by: Gerald Turney Smith
- Music by: Benjamin Frankel
- Production company: London Films
- Distributed by: British Lion Films
- Release date: 22 November 1954
- Running time: 84 minutes
- Country: United Kingdom
- Language: English

Aunt Clara is a 1954 British comedy film directed by Anthony Kimmins and starring Margaret Rutherford, Ronald Shiner, A. E. Matthews and Fay Compton. It was written by Kenneth Horne based on the 1952 novel of the same name by Noel Streatfeild, and was produced by London Films at Shepperton Studios near London with sets designed by the art director Paul Sheriff.

A woman inherits a number of shady businesses from a relative.

== Plot ==
Clara Hilton is a shrewd older lady mostly ignored by the rest of her family. When her uncle Simon dies, he unexpectedly leaves her the bulk of his considerable estate – his house, six racing greyhounds, a crooked game, a pub and a brothel – because she alone would see to the well-being of those dependent on him. Clara keeps Simon's valet Henry Martin on to assist her.

Henry and Cyril and Maggie Mason, who run the pub, try to keep her from seeing what kind of business they are running, but she quickly finds out. She also discovers that Simon's "natural daughter" Julie Mason, to whom he left £20 a month for life, has disappeared. Clara decides to have her solicitor Charles Willis try to find her, only to discover he met Julie at the funeral and is dining with her that very evening.

Then she learns that Fosdick, the man operating the crooked Gambler's Luck wheel of fortune, will be at Epsom Downs, so she goes to meet him. With the police closing in, Fosdick hastily departs, leaving Clara in charge of the game. She and Henry are taken into custody. Charles clears up the matter.

Next, Alfie and Lily Pearce deceive Clara into believing that the greyhounds they are training for her are champions, the furthest thing from the truth.

When Charles finds out the Masons have not given Julie her monthly allowance, they all go to give the Masons the opportunity to explain themselves. In private, Cyril Mason tells Charles that they kept the money because Julie has no morals. Charles punches him. Later, he and Julie marry.

Clara puts on a fundraiser for a children's holiday fund, but the donations are meagre. Henry unexpectedly presents the patrons the opportunity to play Gambler's Luck. Afterward, Clara gives the game to Fosdick, on the understanding that he send half the winnings to her charity.

At the greyhound races, Alfie substitutes a champion for his perennial loser, but Clara feeds the animal hot dogs beforehand, causing him to fade, and costing Alfie and Henry £25 each, plus a £20 cup. Clara, on the other hand, wins her bet, as she had placed it on another dog. Later, she reimburses the pair for their losses and anticipates that Alfie will play fairly from now on.

Finally, Clara goes to see brothel-owner Gladys Smith. She and her girls are getting on in years and will not be able to ply their trade for very much longer. Clara reveals that she does not have much longer to live, and they are the last responsibility Uncle Simon left her. After Clara dies, her will leaves the women the house and funds to support them, and the pub goes to Henry.

== Cast ==
- Ronald Shiner as Henry Martin
- Margaret Rutherford as Clara Hilton
- A. E. Matthews as Simon Hilton
- Fay Compton as Gladys Smith
- Nigel Stock as Charles Willis
- Jill Bennett as Julie
- Reginald Beckwith as Alfie Pearce
- Raymond Huntley as Maurice Hilton
- Eddie Byrne as Fosdick
- Sid James as Honest Sid
- Diana Beaumont as Dorrie
- Garry Marsh as Arthur Cole
- Gillian Lind as Doris Hilton
- Ronald Ward as Cyril Mason
- Eileen Way as Maggie Mason
- Jessie Evans as Lily Pearce
- Jean St. Clair as Alice Cole
- Fanny Rowe as Maggie Mason
- Stringer Davis as Dr. Graham
- Joss Ambler asPaul Levington
- Ambrosine Phillpotts as Sylvia Levington
- Vivienne Martin as maid
- Bruce Beeby as detective
- Tom Walls Jr. as bookmaker
- Prince Monolulu as black bookmaker
- Jack McNaughton as coach driver in pub
- Charles Lloyd Pack as Simon's doctor
- Johnnie Schofield as barman (uncredited)
- George Benson as photographer (uncredited)

== Reception ==
The Monthly Film Bulletin wrote: "The story of this little film is an old joke, and normally quite a good one. That it does not here succeed is due in part to the excessive whimsy attached to the character of Aunt Clara; in part to Margaret Rutherford's being quite unsuited to the intention of gentle sentimentality of the character – even if she were not frilled and bonneted up like a pantomime dame. The rest of the cast seems to include almost every minor English character player, including Ras Prince Monolulu. Ronald Shiner gives a sympathetic performance; Fay Compton is briefly effective as a conventional Madame."

Kine Weekly wrote: "Fruit, comedy with compelling sentimental overtones. ... Margaret Rutherford is the centre, but Ronald Shiner, seen in his best role ever, closely shadows her, and the pair, generously supported, give point to its smart lines and tender and hilarious situations."

TV Guide wrote: "a charming film dotted with cameos by noted British comics."
