= Ballet Shoes (film) =

2007 British television film

- Promotional poster
- Based on: Ballet Shoes by Noel Streatfeild
- Screenplay by: Heidi Thomas
- Directed by: Sandra Goldbacher
- Starring: Emilia Fox; Victoria Wood; Emma Watson; Yasmin Paige; Lucy Boynton; Richard Griffiths; Marc Warren; Lucy Cohu; Gemma Jones; Harriet Walter; Eileen Atkins; Peter Boyles; Adrian Lester
- Music by: Kevin Sargent
- Country of origin: United Kingdom
- Original language: English

Production
- Producer: Piers Wenger
- Cinematography: Peter Greenhalgh
- Editor: Adam Recht
- Running time: 85 minutes
- Production companies: British Broadcasting Company; Granada Television

Original release
- Network: BBC One
- Release: 26 December 2007

Ballet Shoes is a 2007 British television film, adapted by Heidi Thomas from Noel Streatfeild's 1936 novel by the same name. It was produced by Granada Productions (formerly Granada Television) and premiered on BBC One on 26 December 2007. It is directed by Sandra Goldbacher.

The novel was previously adapted by the BBC as a television series in 1975 and directed by Timothy Combe.

== Plot ==
A young orphan, Sylvia Brown, and her nurse, Nana, come to live at Great Uncle Matthew's, nicknamed Gum, house in London. He is initially reluctant to take them in, but relents as he is her only living relative. As a palaeontologist, he is frequently away on expeditions to collect fossils.

In 1919, Gum brings home an orphaned baby girl whose parents died on the RMS Titanic. He adopts her, names her Pauline Fossil, and leaves her in the care of Sylvia and Nana in London. Two years later, he adopts Petrova. In 1923, he adopts Posy, whom he ships to the house with her mother's ballet shoes and necklaces for the three girls. He explains that Posy's father died, and her mother is unable to care for her. He also leaves sufficient funds in the bank for five years before disappearing.

As Gum's money runs out during The Great Depression, Sylvia withdraws Pauline and Petrova from Cromwell House and homeschools them with Posy. To generate income, she also takes in four boarders: Theo Dane, a dance teacher, John Simpson, a repair garage owner, and Dr. Smith and Dr. Jakes, retired professors. Inspired by the latter, the Fossil sisters vow to "put their names in the history books" through service to their country, renewing it on birthdays and Christmas.

After watching the girls dance, Theo encourages Sylvia to enrol them at the Children's Academy of Dancing and Stage Training. Despite having reservations, she and Nana reluctantly agree, hoping that the training will help them earn a living in the future. Madam Fidolia, the school's owner, quickly notices Posy's proficiency in ballet and offers to privately teach her. Meanwhile, Dr. Smith and Dr. Jakes also tutor the sister for free.

Once Pauline is old enough to perform on stage, she auditions for the role of Alice in Alice's Adventures in Wonderland. To help her afford a frock for the same, John offers her an interest-free loan, using Gum's necklaces as collateral, on the condition that she pays him back with her wages. Upon getting the part, she also gives Sylvia thirty shillings a week as housekeeping money. The role, however, inflates her ego, causing her to behave rudely. Upon losing her temper at Mr. French, the director, she is replaced by her understudy, Winifred.

Over time, Sylvia's health worsens, causing the sisters, particularly Petrova, to worry. In order to afford a holiday in the countryside to help her lungs recover, Pauline and Petrova audition for fairies in A Midsummer Night's Dream. Despite performing poorly, Petrova is hired as she is the only applicant for the role. Mr. French, recognising Pauline, employs her as well.

Petrova, who dislikes acting and would rather fly planes, acts badly and is nearly fired. She does, however, see it through for the money, despite it being extended due to its success.

While camping, John drives down to Sylvia and the sisters to inform them that Pauline was offered an audition for the movie, Charles in Exile. She gets the role, but struggles with film acting and initially dislikes it. Soon after, Pauline and Petrova act in a pantomime of Cinderella. Even with this money, Sylvia is unable to afford their house's upkeep. Having not heard from Gum in twelve years, she has the solicitors declare him dead and sells the house.

Madam Fidolia takes Posy to see Valentine Manoff's adaptation of Swan Lake. There, she has a stroke and is paralysed, leaving Posy devastated as she believes her future as a ballerina is in peril. After being scolded by Sylvia for her selfish ambition, she runs away to audition for Manoff’s ballet school in Prague and is accepted.

Charles in Exile is a hit, and Pauline is offered a five-year contract in Hollywood with a talent agency. Despite being unsure, she signs the contract to afford to send Posy to the ballet school with Nana, while she plans to move to America with Sylvia. Gum, who unexpectedly returns to London, offers to teach Petrova to fly planes.

Pauline and Posy then amend their vow to get Petrova's name into the history books, rather than their own. The movie ends with her flying over Sylvia and John's wedding.

== Cast ==
- Emilia Fox as Sylvia Brown
- Victoria Wood as Nana
- Emma Watson as Pauline Fossil
- Yasmin Paige as Petrova Fossil
- Lucy Boynton as Posy Fossil
- Richard Griffiths as Great Uncle Matthew
- Marc Warren as Mr. John Simpson
- Lucy Cohu as Theodora "Theo" Dane
- Gemma Jones as Dr. Jakes
- Harriet Walter as Dr. Smith
- Eileen Atkins as Madame Fidolia
- Heather Nicol as Winifred Bagnall
- Mary Stockley as Miss Jay
- Theresa Churcher as Clara
- Skye Bennett as a Young Sylvia
- Peter Bowles as Sir Donald Houghton
- Don Gallagher as Mr. French
- Emma Darwall-Smith as Titania
- Isabella Parriss as Cobweb
- Jade Longley as Moth
- Adrian Lester as Mr. Sholsky
- Tim Wallers as Mr. Montague
- Gresby Nash as Leopold Neville
- Ebe Sievwright as Valentin Manoff

== Production ==
In a press release dated July 2007 it was announced that the film would begin shooting that August. Screenwriter and producer Heidi Thomas called the schedule "murderous".

Both Victoria Wood and Thomas described Streatfeild's novel as a book they have long treasured. Producer Piers Wenger, who said the film has a "strong rites-of-passage story", related the film to the current "cult of the TV talent shows", and said that it "is also a great antidote to the notion of fame for fame's sake".

=== Casting ===
A July 2007 report from Digital Spy written by Kimberley Dadds announced the involvement of Woods, Griffiths and Warren; the BBC announced that open casting for the roles of the sisters would be a week later. Emilia Fox plays the part of Sylvia Brown in this adaptation; her mother, Joanna David, played the part of Theo Dane in the 1975 BBC adaptation of the same story. Emma Watson, Richard Griffiths and Gemma Jones have all starred in films in the Harry Potter franchise, playing Hermione Granger, Uncle Vernon Dursley and Madam Poppy Pomfrey respectively. In addition, Gemma Jones starred in the 1995 adaptation of Sense and Sensibility as Mrs. Dashwood, while Lucy Boynton (Posy) played Margaret Dashwood in the 2008 BBC adaptation of the same novel. Louise Keller of Urban Cinefile notes that this is Emma Watson's first role other than that of Hermione, though her voice would later be heard in The Tale of Despereaux. Identical twin girls Lucy and Nina Watson, who take turns playing a younger Pauline in this film, are Emma Watson's younger half-sisters and only appear in the uncut DVD version of the film.

== Broadcast and commercial releases ==
The film was released on DVD in Europe in Region 2 on 7 January 2008. The film had a limited release in U.S. theaters on 26 August 2008; this can be seen as part of Screenvision's initiative to expand its venue. According to a press release on Screenvision's website, KOCH Vision bought the North American Home Entertainment rights from Granada International and partnered with Screenvision; KOCH Vision President Michael Rosenberg said that the theatrical run would help promote the DVD. Participating theaters promoted the film with a trailer and a poster earlier that August, and Random House promoted the "Shoe Books", in association with the film. Ballet Shoes was released on DVD in North America, Region 1, on 2 September 2008. The film premiered on Christmas Eve on TV ONE in New Zealand. It was broadcast in Canada on CBC. It was aired in Australia on 7 June 2009.

== Reception ==
On Rotten Tomatoes, the film has an approval rating of 100% based on reviews from 6 critics, with an average rating of 7.7/10.

Wayne Myers of The Oneida Daily Dispatch called it an "embraceable film of the sort that emerges more frequently from elsewhere nowadays than Hollywood", and praised the performances of Paige, Watson, Boynton and Nicol. Brian Orndorf wrote that Emilia Fox as Sylvia "forms the spine of the story" and that Goldbacher "is cautious to silently weave the performance throughout the film to undercut any saccharine temptations." Betty Joe Tucker of ReelTalk Movie Reviews praised the way film evokes the 1930s. Gina Catanzarite, in a review for Parents' Choice, suggested that there may be too much plot material for the film's relatively short running time.
