= Noel Streatfeild =

English author (1895–1986)

Mary Noel Streatfeild OBE
- Noel Streatfeild, 1936
- Born: 24 December 1895; Frant, Sussex
- Died: 11 November 1986 (aged 90)
- Parent: William Streatfeild (father)
- Relatives: Ruth Gervis (sister)
- Writing career
- Pen name: Susan Scarlett
- Genre: Children's literature
- Notable awards: Carnegie Medal

Mary Noel Streatfeild /ˈnoʊəl ˈstrɛtfiːld/ (24 December 1895 – 11 September 1986) was an English author, best known for children's books including the "Shoes" books, which were not a series (though some books made references to others). Random House, the US publisher of the 1936 novel Ballet Shoes (1936), published some of Streatfeild's subsequent children's books using the word "Shoes" in their titles, to capitalise on the popularity of Ballet Shoes; thus Circus Shoes (originally called The Circus Is Coming), Party Shoes (originally called Party Frock), Skating Shoes (originally called White Boots) and many more. She won the third annual Carnegie Medal for The Circus Is Coming.

Streatfeild also wrote 12 romance novels under the pen name Susan Scarlett. She was a member of the historic Streatfeild family. Several of her novels have been adapted for film or television.

== Early life ==
Mary Noel Streatfeild was born in Frant, Sussex, the second of five surviving children of William Champion Streatfeild, later the Bishop of Lewes, and Janet Mary Venn. Her life is described in three semi-autobiographical novels: A Vicarage Family, Away from the Vicarage and Beyond the Vicarage. Her elder sister Ruth Gervis illustrated Ballet Shoes. Noel was considered the "plain" sister in her family, but she shone in performances with her sisters for charity. Upon reaching adulthood she sought a career in theatre, and gained ten years of experience as an actress, working for the Charles Doran and Arthur Bourchier companies. Her familiarity with the stage was the basis for many of her popular books for children, which are often about children struggling with careers in the arts.

== Writing career ==
Her first children's book was Ballet Shoes, published by J. M. Dent in 1936. She recalled, "The story poured off my pen, more or less telling itself ... I distrusted what came easily and so despised the book." It was a commended runner-up for the inaugural Carnegie Medal from the Library Association, recognising the year's best British children's book, (Note: Today there are usually eight books on the Carnegie shortlist. According to CCSU there were about 160 commended runners up for 1936 and the 49 years from 1954 to 2002, including Streatfeild and Howard Spring for 1936.) and it launched a successful career in writing for children. For her third book and third "Shoes" novel, The Circus Is Coming (later published as Circus Shoes), she won the 1938 Carnegie Medal.

Her first novel for adults, The Whicharts (1931), is the progenitor of Ballet Shoes. Three illegitimate babies are dropped in turn by their father on his lovelorn ex-mistress. When he dies in the war, she goes to work in a munitions factory and sends the girls to a rather seedy theatrical school from where two emerge as actress and good time girl (Mamie), and one as a dancer (Daisy). The third, Tania, becomes interested in motorcars and 'planes. Unlike Ballet Shoes, the book extends into the adulthood of the three girls.

Streatfeild spoke about her early life and career in an interview for the BBC's Desert Island Discs on 19 January 1976.

She was appointed an Officer of the Order of the British Empire (OBE) in the 1983 New Year Honours.

Several of her children's novels, including Ballet Shoes and Dennis the Dragon, were illustrated by her sister Ruth Gervis.

== Adaptations ==
Aunt Clara was filmed in 1954 with Margaret Rutherford in the title role.

In 1968 London Weekend Television produced a six-episode serial of The Growing Summer, with Wendy Hiller as Aunt Dymphna. It was filmed in Bantry (Bantry House), in Ahakista and near Kilcrohane on the Sheep's Head Peninsula in County Cork, Ireland.

Thursday's Child was adapted for television by the BBC in 1972.

Ballet Shoes was made into a 6-episode television series by the BBC in 1975. In 2007 it was made into a feature-length film for BBC One. A Granada production film, Ballet Shoes, was adapted by the screenwriter Heidi Thomas and starred Emilia Fox as Sylvia Brown, Victoria Wood as Nana, Emma Watson as Pauline Fossil, Yasmin Paige as Petrova Fossil, Lucy Boynton as Posy Fossil and Richard Griffiths as Great Uncle Matthew.

Ballet Shoes was adapted by Kendall Feaver for the stage in 2024, opening at the National Theatre in London and returning for a second run in 2025.

== Allusions in other works ==
Noel Streatfeild was recommended by Meg Ryan's character in the 1998 film You've Got Mail. "Noel Streatfeild wrote Ballet Shoes and Skating Shoes and Theatre Shoes and Dancing Shoes and...I'd start with Ballet Shoes first. It's my favorite ... although Skating Shoes is completely wonderful. But it's out of print."

== Works discovered posthumously ==
In 2018, several previously unpublished stories were discovered in the papers of Noel Streatfeild, which were in the possession of her nephew, William Streatfeild.These were published in two collections from Virago Press, Noel Streatfeild's Christmas Stories and Noel Streatfeild's Holiday Stories, in 2018 and 2019 respectively. The original copies of the stories are now stored at the Seven Stories Museum in Newcastle, England.

== Selected works ==
Children's fiction

- Ballet Shoes (1936)
- Tennis Shoes (1937)
- The Circus Is Coming (1938), also published as Circus Shoes
- Dennis the Dragon (1939)
- The House in Cornwall (1940), also published in the US as The Secret of the Lodge
- The Children of Primrose Lane (1941), also published as The Stranger in Primrose Lane
- Curtain Up (1944), also published as Theater Shoes
- Party Frock (1946), also published as Party Shoes
- The Painted Garden (1949), significantly abridged and published in the U.S. as Movie Shoes
- White Boots (1951), also published as Skating Shoes
- The Theatre Cat (1951)
- The Fearless Treasure (1953)
- The Bell Family (1954), also published as Family Shoes
- Wintle's Wonders (1957), also published as Dancing Shoes
- Bertram (1959)
- New Town (1961)
- Apple Bough (1962), also published as Traveling Shoes
- A Vicarage Family (1963)
- The First Book of the Ballet (1963)
- Lisa Goes to Russia (1963)
- The Children on the Top Floor (1964)
- Away from the Vicarage (1965)
- The Growing Summer (1966), also published as The Magic Summer
- Caldicott Place (1967), also published as The Family at Caldicott Place
- The Grey Family (1967)
- The "Gemma" series (1968–69) - consists of Gemma (1968), Gemma and Sisters (1968), Gemma Alone (1969), Good-bye Gemma (1969).
- Thursday's Child (1970)
- Beyond the Vicarage (1971)
- Ballet Shoes for Anna (1972)
- When the Siren Wailed (1974)
- Far to Go (1976), sequel to Thursday's Child
- Gran-Nannie (1976), also published as Tea by the Nursery Fire
- Meet the Maitlands (1978)
- The Maitlands: All Change at Cuckley Place (1979), sequel to the above

Collections

- Noel Streatfeild's Christmas Stories (2018 Virago Press) - consists of "The Audition" (1949), "The Bells Keep Twelfth Night" (1951), "The Moss Rose" (1950), "Thimble" (1951), "The Princess" (1962), "The Chain" (1950), "Christmas at Collers" (1960), "The Pantomime Goose" (1951), "Skating to the Stars" (1952)
- Noel Streatfeild's Holiday Stories (2019 Virago Press) - consists of "The Plain One: A note from the author" (1976), "Devon Mettle" (1933), "Chicken for Supper" (1951), "Flag's Circus" (1954), "The Secret" (1959), "Coralie" (1959), "Ordinary Me" (1959), "Cows Eat Flowers" (1965), "Andrew's Trout" (1964), "The Old Fool", "Let's Go Coaching" (1964), "Howard" (1966), "The Quiet Holiday" (1968), "Roberta", "Green Silk" (1977).

Adult fiction

- The Whicharts (1931)
- Parson's Nine (1932)
- Tops and Bottoms (1933)
- A Shepherdess of Sheep (1934)
- It Pays to Be Good (1936)
- Caroline England (1937)
- Luke (1939)
- The Winter is Past (1940)
- I Ordered a Table for Six (1942)
- Myra Carroll (1944)
- Saplings (1945)
- Grass in Piccadilly (1947)
- Mothering Sunday (1950)
- Aunt Clara (1952), made into a 1954 film of the same title
- Judith (1956)
- The Silent Speaker (1961)

Adult fiction under the pseudonym Susan Scarlett

- Clothes-Pegs (1939)
- Sally-Ann (1939)
- Peter and Paul (1940)
- Ten Way Street (1940)
- The Man in the Dark (1940)
- Babbacombe (1941)
- Under the Rainbow (1941)
- Summer Pudding (1943)
- Murder While You Work (1944)
- Poppies for England (1947)
- Pirouette (1948)
- Love in a Mist (1951)

Nonfiction

- The Years of Grace (1950)
- Queen Victoria (1958)
- Magic and the Magician: E. Nesbit and her Children's Books (1958)
- The Boy Pharaoh, Tutankhamen (1972)
- Gran-Nannie (1976), also published as Tea by the Nursery Fire

Edited

- Growing up Gracefully (1955), illustrated by John Dugan
- The Day Before Yesterday: Firsthand Stories of Fifty Years Ago (1956), illustrated by Dick Hart
- To the Garden of Delights (1960)
