= Ballet Shoes (1975 serial) =

1975 British TV children's drama series

- DVD cover
- Genre: Children's drama
- Based on: Ballet Shoes by Noel Streatfeild
- Written by: John Wiles
- Directed by: Timothy Combe
- Starring: Elizabeth Morgan; Sarah Prince; Jane Slaughter; Angela Thorne; Joanna David; Barbara Lott; Mary Morris
- Country of origin: United Kingdom
- Original language: English
- No. of episodes: 6

Production
- Producer: John McRae
- Editor: Sheila S. Tomlinson
- Running time: 25 minutes
- Production company: BBC

Original release
- Network: BBC One
- Release: 5 October – 9 November 1975

Related
- Ballet Shoes (2007)

Ballet Shoes is British six-part television adaptation of Noel Streatfeild's novel Ballet Shoes first broadcast on BBC One in 1975. Adapted by John Wiles and directed by Timothy Combe, the series was aired in six parts on Sunday evenings. It was aired by PBS in the United States on 27 December 1976.

== Cast ==
- Elizabeth Morgan as Pauline Fossil
- Sarah Prince as Posy Fossil
- Jane Slaughter as Petrova Fossil
- Barbara Lott as Nana
- Angela Thorne as Sylvia Brown
- Mary Morris as Madame Fidolia
- Patrick Godfrey as Sir Donald Houghton
- Terence Skelton as Mr Simpson
- Sheila Keith as Dr Jakes
- Joanna David as Theo Danes
- Samantha Clogg as Winifred Bagnall

== Awards ==
Ballet Shoes was awarded a BAFTA for Light Entertainment for producer John McRae in 1976. In 1977, Ballet Shoes was awarded an Emmy for Outstanding Children's Special.
