= Shoestring Falls =

Waterfall in Washington (state), United States

Shoestring Falls (also called Siah Falls) is a waterfall, about 1,000 feet (300 m) high, fed by an unnamed stream coming from Malachite Glacier in the Alpine Lakes Wilderness Area, King County, Washington, United States. It is 20 feet (6.1 m) in breadth and flows year-round, but is at peak flow May to July. It drops down the mountainside in five distinct tiers, with the two main tiers totaling about 700 feet (210 m). It is at .

Nearby Sunray Falls, at, about 400 feet (120 m) high, shares the same cliff as Shoestring Falls and most likely shares the same creek, making the two falls count as a double drop.

== Notes ==
47.63127°N 121.31881°W 47°37′48″N 121°19′12″W
