= Shoestring Radio Theatre =

American radio theatre company

Shoestring Radio Theatre is a non-profit radio theatre company based in San Francisco, California, that produces two weekly radio shows, "Shoestring Radio Theatre," which features originally produced radio plays, and the movie-review program "Movie Magazine".

Founded in 1988 by producer Monica Sullivan, and co-produced by Steve Rubenstein, Shoestring is one of the few radio theatre companies left in America. They broadcast weekly on flagship radio station KUSF 90.3FM in San Francisco, as well as on 111 public radio stations across the U.S. (as well as Montreal, Canada), and on the World Wide Web. With their Bay Area-based troupe of local actors and playwrights, they create 24 new half-hour radio plays a year. Their repertoire includes comedies, dramas, thrillers, science-fiction and murder mysteries, as well as radio adaptations of classic stories.
