= Shoes (Reparata song) =

- UK picture sleeve

Single by Reparata
- A-side: "Shoes"
- B-side: "A Song for All"
- Released: 1975
- Recorded: 1975
- Length: 3:01
- Label: Polydor and Dart
- Songwriter: Eric Beam
- Producers: Steve and Bill Jerome, Lou Guarino for Nami Records

Reparata singles chronology
"Whenever a Teenager Cries" (1974)	"Shoes" (1975)	"Jesabee Lancer (The Belly Dancer)" (1976)

French picture sleeve

Italian picture sleeve

"Shoes" is a 1975 single by Reparata.

== Earlier recordings ==
The song "Shoes" was first recorded by Felix Harp, a band from Trafford and Level Green, Pennsylvania, with music and lyrics by bandmember Eric Beam. It was released as a single in 1973, renamed "She Didn't Forget Her Shoes (Johnny and Louise)" on Lou Guarino's NAMI label as NAMI 2011, produced by Guarino himself.

In 1974 the German group, Love Generation recorded the song as "Johnny and Louise (She Didn't Forget Her Shoes)", and it was released as a single. They also recorded a German-language version called "Johnny und Louise", released on United Artists as UA 35685. The Love Generation versions of the song wrongly give the songwriting credit to "Harp".

Also in 1974, the British folk group The (New) Settlers released a version on York Records as YR218 with a different title again, "She Didn't Forget Her Shoes".

== Recording ==
In 1974, Lou Guarino produced the recording by Reparata, using a remix of the original Felix Harp backing track. The co-producers were Steve and Bill Jerome.

Personnel:

- David Adomites - bass guitar, keyboards
- Michael Ardisson - drums, percussion
- Eric Beam - keyboards
- Billy Hricsina - lead guitar
- David Lenart - lead guitar, slide guitar, mandolin)
- Mary "Reparata" O'Leary - vocals

== Music and lyrics ==
"Shoes" is described by one critic as a "bizarre wedding song". The lyrics tell the story of Johnny and Louise's wedding day, and the contributions of various relatives and friends to the wedding. The song is not about shoes, although it does include the line "Mother didn't give her abuse / she didn't forget her shoes". A family wedding is an unusual subject for a pop song, although not unique: the 10,000 Maniacs' song "My Sister Rose" on their In My Tribe album has a similar subject and similar bittersweet mood.

In its musical style, "Shoes" has what one commentator calls "a Middle Eastern feel". The recording uses an eclectic range of instruments including harpsichord, Jew's harp, bouzouki (which is namechecked in the line "Tom brings his band / bouzouki in his hand") and tambourine and adds some vocal shouts and cheers. There is also an electric guitar solo, and some children's backing vocals, which have been wrongly (and perhaps facetiously) credited to Reparata's sixth grade students (she was a schoolteacher). One blogger describes the song as "Boney M meets Dusty Springfield". Another blogger comments that "This is one weird '70s song. It sounds like “Gypsy Wine” meets “Gypsies, Tramps and Thieves” meets “Bohemian Rhapsody” meets “Hair” meets “Another Brick in the Wall” ... meets some dude playing the harmonica/harpsichord meets a bunch of frogs on helium."

This mixture of styles creates an "absurdly catchy" and unique record, which has been variously described as "discoish" and "Spooky bouzouki" and as sounding like it was written by the maverick US pop and rock group Sparks.

The celebratory lyrics of "Shoes" are undercut by Reparata's understated vocal delivery. She sings in a much lower register than she had used on previous recordings as lead singer of the Reparata and the Delrons, and some listeners have believed they were listening to a male vocal. This ambiguity of the singer's gender adds to the strange mood of the record.

Summarising the sound and mood of "Shoes", one blogger comments that

... despite the surface bonhomie, the music's thrust is slightly threatening and more than slightly unreal, particularly in the middle section when the beat cuts out to let through an ethereal cloud of dishevelled angel choirs ... [While] Reparata's voice strolls as serenely as Carole Bayer Sager's, [it] cannot dispel the feeling that something isn't quite right with the scenario.

== Reparata ==
Reparata was the stage name of Mary Katherine O'Leary (née Aiese), born in Brooklyn in 1945. She formed The Delrons as a high-school student in 1962. When signed and encouraged to use a more interesting or catchy name than Mary or Katherine, she chose her confirmation name of Reparata.

Delrons member Lorraine Mazzola also used the name Reparata during her short period as lead singer, and subsequently changed her given name from Lorraine to Reparata.

The original Reparata released two more singles after "Shoes". She reformed Reparata and the Delrons in 1978 and they performed regularly until 2000. She is now retired from teaching and from performing, and lives in Queens, New York.

== Release, distribution problems ==
The single was released in the UK for promotional purposes only, with "Reperata" misspelled on the label, on 25 October or 5 December 1974 on Surrey International Records as SIT 5013, with "A Song for All" as the B-side.

It was then released commercially on Polydor in the Spring of 1975. By May 1975 it was gaining airplay in the US and continued to be popular in June and July. By August it had entered the Hot 100 at number 92. Then just as "Shoes" was poised to become a bigger hit, two legal problems affected distribution and sales.

First, there was a dispute over the name "Reparata". Mary O'Leary had chosen it as her stage name in 1964, and she had been performing and recording as Reparata ever since. She gave up live shows in 1969, but continued to record occasional singles as Reparata and the Delrons, or as Reparata, including "Shoes". From 1969 to 1973 the Delrons continued doing live shows without her, with bandmate Lorraine Mazzola on lead vocals and calling herself Reparata. By 1975 the live group had disbanded, and Lorraine Mazzola was performing with Barry Manilow in the group Lady Flash, still billed as Reparata. When "Shoes" started gaining attention, radio play and positive reviews in 1975, Mazzola launched a lawsuit over the name. Mary O'Leary explained in a 2005 radio interview that the record had to be removed from sale during the case: "When the record came out, being done by Reparata, the record was squashed because, quote unquote, Reparata was with Barry Manilow. Believe me, it's a whole big megillah..."

Furthermore, a second legal issue affected sales in the UK when a High Court injunction was brought by Reparata's former record label, Dart Records. Billboard magazine reported the matter at the time:

Dart claims that it has sole UK rights in master tapes of recordings made by Reparata under a 3-year contract signed in 1972. Although it is true the agreement expired in February [1975], the opinion of Dart managing director Clive Stanhope is that the master tapes of "Shoes", and the flipside "A Song For All", must have been made before then, and were therefore covered by the agreement.

Clive Stanhope of Dart Records has explained that

When "Shoes" was released by Polydor and became Tony Blackburn's Record of the Week [on BBC Radio One], we approached Polydor but as we had nil response we slapped on the injunction...

The judge, Mr Justice Oliver, later decided that no-one would benefit from an injunction, so he lifted it. In the end, Polydor and Dart settled out of court.

With the separate legal dispute over the name Reparata now ended, the single could now be formally released. Polydor pressed and distributed two identical versions of "Shoes" in August 1975: one had a Dart label (although in the Polydor format), and the other had a regular Polydor label. Both releases had the same catalogue number, 2066 652, and the same picture sleeve, which used the logos of both labels.

Sales were combined for chart purposes, but "Shoes" had now missed its moment in the US. In the UK, Clive Stanhope reflects that

The [...] result of the injunction was that BBC Radio One ceased playing Shoes and what would almost certainly have been a Top Ten record languished in the lower regions of the Top Fifty for a week before dropping out.

"Shoes" did eventually reach number 43 in the UK Singles Chart in October 1975. The record had its best chart success in South Africa, where it reached number 6 in January 1976. In April 1976, Billboard magazine reported that "Shoes" was "a big hit" in Athens, Greece.

"Shoes" was included on the 1975 Ronco compilation 20 Blazing Bullets and on the 1976 Polydor compilation Super Disco, also released as 20 Original Top Hits.

== Cult classic ==
"Shoes" is included on all three of the Reparata and the Delrons "Best of" compilations, despite being a solo single that was recorded some years after the group's other material. Until becoming available again on the compilations in the 2000s, and via music- and video-sharing websites, it had rarely been heard in the media since the mid-1970s.

Consequently, comments about the record on websites and blogs show that it had become something of a cult hit in the decades since its original release, with an unusual sound that had stuck in people's minds for over 30 years, sometimes without them knowing the identity of the song or singer. People from a range of countries comment that although they had not heard the song in many years, they remembered the tune or a specific lyric, and went searching for it online.

== Influence on the Smiths ==
Johnny Marr of the Smiths confirmed that he and singer Morrissey were fans of the record. In a 1989 interview with the NME, Morrissey listed "Shoes" as one of his 14 favourite "Singles to be Cremated With". "Shoes" was the most recent record on Morrissey's list by five years, with all the others dating from between 1959 and 1970.

In a 2013 interview, Johnny Marr confirmed the specific influence of "Shoes" on the group's 1987 song "A Rush and a Push and This Land is Ours":

It was inspired by ["Shoes"], yeah — the bulk of that tune I kind of remembered from being a kid while it was on the English charts. I liked the electric piano—it stuck in my subconscious. It's funny how these things come out.

== Later recordings ==
The British band Sparrow recorded the song for the debut album in 1975. The album was not released until 2020.

Finnish singer Frederik recorded a version renamed "Kunnon maalaishäät".

After Reparata's version, in 1976 a French-language version of the song, called "Le Mariage" was recorded by Sylvie Vartan.

In 2011, the Greek group Trifono added their own lyrics to Eric Beam's music, calling the song "I Agapi Zei" ("Love Lives").
