= Octopus's Garden =

1969 song by the Beatles

- Cover of the song's sheet music

Song by the Beatles

from the album Abbey Road
- Released: 26 September 1969
- Recorded: 26, 29 April, 17–18 July 1969
- Studio: EMI, London
- Genre: Pop rock; country rock
- Length: 2:48
- Label: Apple
- Songwriter: Richard Starkey
- Producer: George Martin

"Octopus's Garden" is a song by the English rock band the Beatles, written and sung by Ringo Starr (credited to his real name Richard Starkey), from their 1969 album Abbey Road. George Harrison, who assisted Starr with the song, commented: "'Octopus's Garden' is Ringo's song. It's only the second song Ringo wrote, and it's lovely." He added that the song gets very deep into the listener's consciousness "because it's so peaceful. I suppose Ringo is writing cosmic songs these days without even realising it." It was the last song released by the Beatles featuring Starr on lead vocals.

== Composition ==
The idea for the song came about when Starr was on a boat belonging to comedian Peter Sellers in Sardinia in 1968. He ordered fish and chips for lunch, but instead of fish, he got squid (it was the first time he had eaten squid, and he said, "It was OK. A bit rubbery. Tasted like chicken.") The boat's captain then told Starr about how octopuses travel along the sea bed picking up stones and shiny objects with which to build gardens. Starr's songwriting was further inspired by his desire to escape mounting hostility among the Beatles; he would later admit that he had "just wanted to be under the sea, too".

Uncredited assistance in developing the song's chord changes was provided by Harrison, who can be seen helping Starr work the song out on piano, with John Lennon later joining in with drums, in the documentaries Let It Be (1970) and The Beatles: Get Back (2021), both using the same footage.

== Recording ==
The basic instrumental track was recorded on 26 April 1969, with the Beatles lineup of two electric guitars (Harrison and Lennon), bass guitar (McCartney) and drums (Starr). Starr also provided a temporary guide vocal on this date. (Take 2 of the recording, featuring this guide vocal, Starr singing the first verse three times, is Track 14 on Disc 2 of Anthology 3.) In the absence of George Martin, the Beatles themselves were listed as producer, with Martin's apprentice Chris Thomas present in the control room to assist. Thirty-two takes were required before the Beatles were satisfied with the track.

According to Mark Lewisohn, the backing vocals by McCartney and Harrison during the guitar solo were put through compressors and limiters to create a gurgling sound. However, since dynamic signal processing does not produce such a modulation effect, Alan Parsons suggests that the effect was probably achieved using the tremolo effect produced by a guitar amplifier. At Starr's request, Harrison added the sound of bubbles by blowing through a straw into a glass of milk.

== Personnel ==
According to Kevin Howlett, Brooke Halpin:

- Ringo Starr – double-tracked lead vocals, drums, percussion
- John Lennon – rhythm guitar
- Paul McCartney – backing vocals, bass guitar, piano
- George Harrison – backing vocals, lead guitar, bubbling effects

== Certifications ==
Region	Certification	Certified units/sales
United Kingdom (BPI)	Silver	200,000^{‡}
^{‡} Sales+streaming figures based on certification alone.

== Love remix ==
The song was remixed in 2006 for the Beatles album Love, which contained remixes of classic Beatles songs. The remix begins with Starr's vocals over the orchestration from "Good Night", then transitions into the original instrumental backing track on the line "I'd ask my friends...", with snippets from "Yellow Submarine" added in the background. During the guitar solo, the drum track is replaced with that of "Lovely Rita" and ends with the beginning guitar riff from "Sun King".

== Other versions ==
Jim Henson's Muppets made three video cover versions of the song, on Sesame Street, Episode 19 in 1969, The Ed Sullivan Show in March 1970, and The Muppet Show Episode 312 in 1978, which was performed by Kermit the Frog, his nephew Robin the Frog, and Miss Piggy.

Oasis and Noel Gallagher have used lyrics from "Octopus's Garden": the phrase "I'd like to be under the sea" is in the refrain of one of Oasis' most popular B-sides, "Take Me Away".

The refrain from the chorus of "Octopus's Garden" can be heard about forty seconds from the end of Oasis's "The Masterplan". The band also frequently use the same refrain at the end of live performances of their 1994 single "Whatever".
