= Ballet Shoes (novel) =

1936 children's novel by Noel Streatfeild

- First edition
- Author: Noel Streatfeild
- Illustrator: Ruth Gervis
- Language: English
- Series: Ballet
- Subject: Three Children on Stage
- Genre: Children's novel, Theatre-fiction
- Publisher: J. M. Dent & Sons
- Publication date: 1936
- Publication place: United Kingdom
- Media type: Print
- Pages: 303 pp (first edition)
- OCLC: 222639171
- LC Class: PZ7.S914 Bal
- Followed by: Tennis Shoes

Ballet Shoes: A Story of Three Children on the Stage is a children's novel by Noel Streatfeild, published by Dent in 1936. Her first book for children, it was illustrated by the author's sister, Ruth Gervis.

Ballet Shoes was a runner up for the inaugural Carnegie Medal from the Library Association, recognising the year's best British children's book by a British subject. (Note: Today there are usually eight books on the Carnegie shortlist. According to CCSU there were about 160 commended runners up for 1936 and the 49 years from 1954 to 2002, including Streatfeild and Howard Spring for 1936.) (Streatfeild won the award later for The Circus Is Coming. (Note: She won the Medal for her third novel, The Circus Is Coming, published as Circus Shoes in the US. The 'Shoes' titles, used by the authors US publishers, do not indicate that the books are a narrative series, but rather just that the books are of a similar style/genre.))

== Plot summary ==
The book concerns three adopted sisters, Pauline, Petrova and Posy Fossil. Each of the girls is discovered as a baby by Matthew Brown (Great-Uncle-Matthew, known as "Gum"), an elderly, absentminded palaeontologist and professor, during his world travels, and sent home to his practical great niece, Sylvia, and her childhood nanny Nana who live in London, England.

Gum embarks upon an expedition of many years and arranges for money to support the family while he is gone. Gum does not return in the promised five years and the money is almost gone. As they have no way to contact or track him down, Sylvia and Nana take in boarders to make ends meet, including Mr. Simpson and his wife, Dr. Jakes and Dr. Smith, a pair of tutors who take over the children's education after Sylvia can no longer afford their school fees. Boarder Theo Dane, a dance teacher, arranges for the children to begin classes at the Children's Academy of Dancing and Stage Training.

Pauline finds she has a talent and passion for acting while Petrova hates acting and dancing. Posy has a real talent for dancing. When she is about six, Madame Fidolia, a famous and retired Russian dancer, gives Posy private lessons, something she has never done before. As the children mature, they take on some of the responsibility of supporting the household. Much of the drama comes from the friction between the sisters and from balancing their desire to help support the family financially against the laws limiting the amount of time they may spend on stage. When Pauline is picked for a lead part in Alice's Adventures in Wonderland after performing in The Blue Bird, the early success goes to her head, because of which the producer replaces her with her understudy (although only for a single performance, not permanently as portrayed in the 2007 film). Through this, Pauline learns enough humility to balance her talent, and goes on to play many successful lead parts.

Posy is developing into a brilliant ballet dancer. She also clashes with her sisters, as she is so focused on dancing that she is insensitive about anything that gets in her way. Petrova is not interested in the performing arts and has little talent for it but must keep attending classes and performing to help support the family. However, she holds onto her own dream of flying aircraft.

The book ends with Pauline going off to Hollywood to make a film, accompanied by Sylvia. Posy is going to a ballet school in Prague, accompanied by Nana. Petrova wonders what will become of her, as she is still too young to live on her own and doesn't want to dance or act. At this moment, Gum arrives. He has been away so long that he doesn't realize who the three girls are at first, but after recognising that they are the three babies he left all those years ago, he decides he will take Petrova under his wing and help her achieve her dream.

== Characters ==
- Gum Great-Uncle Matthew Brown, an elderly geologist and professor, who finds the three sisters during his travels. Gum is Sylvia's great uncle and later guardian after her parents die.
- Sylvia Brown Gum's great-niece, known to the girls as "Garnie", short for Guardian. Sylvia is a practical and caring woman. Sylvia's father died at the beginning of the book and she and her mother moved in with Gum. When Sylvia was 16 her mother died.
- Nana Alice Gutheridge, Sylvia's stern nurse. Called "Nana" by family and friends alike.
- Pauline Fossil The eldest sister by two years, rescued from a shipwreck. Pauline lives in London, England. She begins attending school when she is six years old, but is forced to leave when Sylvia, as her guardian, can no longer pay the school fees. She is then tutored for free by Dr. Jakes and Dr. Smith, who are boarders in the house of her guardian. Another boarder, Miss Theo Dane, suggests that all three girls go to the Children's Academy of Dancing and Stage Training, in order to earn an income when they become old enough to work. Pauline is enrolled with her sisters. When she is ten, she shows some promise in dancing. However, it is her acting ability that set her apart, soon becoming the best actress in her class.
- Petrova Fossil The middle sister, adopted from a young couple who died in Russia. Petrova is a tomboy, hardworking and diligent, but interested only in engines and airplanes and cars.
- Posy Fossil The youngest sister by two years, whom Gum sends to the house by district messenger in a basket with a pair of ballet shoes. Her mother, a dancer, may well be alive, as it is said she 'has no time for babies' at the time of Posy's adoption. Posy is considered a child dance prodigy, though she was still too young to perform on stage at the book's conclusion.
- Dr. Jakes and Dr. Smith Boarders. A pair of retired professors of literature and maths, respectively, who offer to teach the girls. Dr. Jakes first inspires the girls to think of their adoptive state as being full of potential and individuality, without any chance of their achievements being attributed to family connections.
- Mr. and Mrs. Simpson Boarders. Mr. Simpson is particularly friendly with Petrova, on account of his Citroën car and auto-repair garage. In the 2007 film adaptation Mrs. Simpson's character was abandoned so that Mr. Simpson could serve as a love interest for Sylvia.
- Miss Theodora "Theo" Dane The last boarder. A dance teacher at the Children's Academy of Classical Ballet.
- Madame Fidolia A retired Russian prima ballerina of the old Russian empire. Now head of the Children's Academy of Dancing and Stage Training. Posy's teacher and mentor.
- Winifred A fellow student at the Children's Academy. Though considered the best all-round pupil at the academy, she often loses major roles on account of her plain looks and inadequate clothing, the latter a result of her large family's poverty. Winifred is both a particular friend and rival of Pauline.

== Television adaptations ==
Ballet Shoes has twice been adapted for the screen, both by the BBC:

- Ballet Shoes in 1975, starring Elizabeth Morgan, Sarah Prince, and Jane Slaughter as the sisters.
- Ballet Shoes in 2007, starring Emma Watson, Yasmin Paige, and Lucy Boynton as the sisters.

== Stage adaptation ==
The novel was adapted by Kendall Fever into a play which premiered at the National Theatre, London in November 2024 for a limited run, directed by Katy Rudd. The play will return in autumn 2025.

== In popular culture ==
- The Shoes books are mentioned in the film You've Got Mail by Meg Ryan's character, a bookstore owner, who highlights Ballet Shoes as her favourite and the best of the Shoe books to read first.
- In Anne Raverat's debut novel "Lover", the main character mentions how she first fell in love with reading at age "seven with Ballet Shoes" and that she "didn't know" who she wanted to be more out of the three sisters (p. 267, Farrar, Straus and Giroux, 2017).

== Critical reception ==
On 5 November 2019 BBC News included Ballet Shoes on its list of the 100 most influential novels.
