= Richard Streatfeild =

English ironmaster (1559–1601)

Richard Streatfeild (1 October 1559 – 18 September 1601) of Chiddingstone, Kent was an ironmaster who established the financial base for this significant Kentish family.

== Origins ==
Richard Streatfeild was born (or baptised) on 16 October 1559. He lived all his life, as far as is known, in the village of Chiddingstone, in the Weald of Kent. He was the son of Henry Streatfeild (1535-1598) and Alice Moody (1535-1575) and grandson of Robert Streatfeild the patriarch of the family.

== Occupation ==
Richard was an ironmaster which means he ran a foundry and forges. He is recorded as leasing Canserns (also spelt Canserne or Cansiron) Forge in Hartfield, Sussex, in 1589 and Pilbeams (Ashurst) Forge in Chiddingstone and Withyham on the borders of Kent and Sussex in 1592, and he died in possession of the latter in 1601. A tilt hammer shaft and wooden anvil base found at Cansiron Forge are in the Anne of Cleaves Museum in Lewes.

The details of the lease of Pilbeams Forge in 1592 reflect some of what was involved in the work. The lease included: “A forge or ironwork called Pilbeames Forge with buildings, cottages, coalhouses, coal-places, ground to lay sows of raw iron and all ponds, dikes, bays, floodgates, tools as shown in the schedule, access to the forge through the lands of John Pylcock and Richard Hart all in Chiddingstone and Withyham and two parcels of land on the south side of the forge in Withyham containing 6a. called Cleyes in the occupation of John Tantos; George Stace of Mereworth, yeoman, to Richard Streatfeild of Chiddingstone, yeoman, for a year at £25.”

Richard was certainly the one who established the strong economic foundation for the Streatfeild family. In his will he was still termed a yeoman, though by this time he had become a lord of a manor, and thus a gentleman, the manor of Cowden Leighton having been purchased in 1591 by himself and his father from a neighbouring noble family in decline, the Burgh family of Starborough Castle in Lingfield, Surrey. Further lands of the Burgh family were purchased in the same year and in 1596 the manors of Chiddingstone Cobham and Tyehurst were mortgaged by Thomas, Lord Burgh, to Richard Streatfeild's trustees. The mortgage was never repaid and the manors remained in the possession of members of the Streatfeild family.

There is an article about Richard displayed in an oak frame on the north side of the west wall of St. Mary’s church in Chiddingstone. The source and date of it are not shown, but it refers to the memorial of Richard Streatfeild, which is an iron slab on the nave floor of the Church.

== Family ==
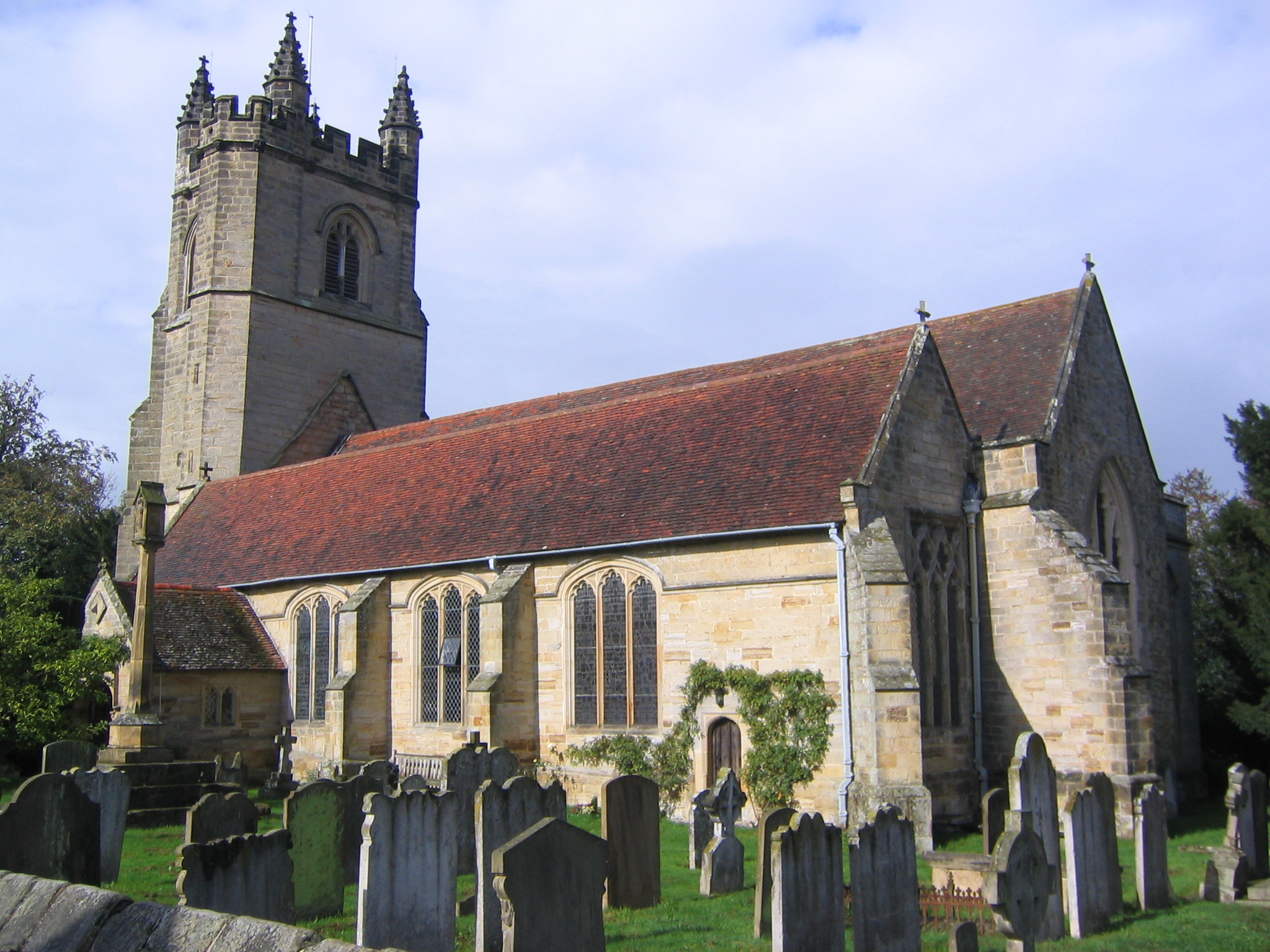
St Mary's Church, Chiddingstone where Richard Streatfeild and many of his descendants were baptised and buried - there are many Streatfeild memorials in the church

Richard married Anne Fremlyn on 15 November 1583 in Kemsing, Kent. Anne was born about 1560. After Richard’s death in 1601 Anne married William Birsty of Hever, Kent in 1602. Some documents say Anne died about 1630, but it seems to be after 1636. Anne was the daughter and co-heir (with her sister Catherine, wife of Silvester Page, Esq.) of John Fremlyn of Kemsing.

William Birsty, Anne’s second husband was buried in the nave at Chidingstone, where there is a brass to his memory, inscribed:- "Guilemus filius Tho de Birchensty Com. Sussex ex Anna una cohaeredum Johannis Fremling duas relinquens filias, Annam et Catharinam obiit XX°., die mensis, Maij Ao Dni MDCXXXVII, Aetatis LXVIII." Above are the Birsty arms, incorrectly differenced by a crescent instead of a star, impaling Fremling, namely "Gules, a chevron between three helmets argent plumed and vizored or." Administration of his estate was granted on 15 June 1637 to Anna Birsty, relict, out of Shoreham Peculiars. This brass points to Anne’s father being John, but also points to her death date being after 1637, as she was stated as William’s widow.

Richard died on 18 September 1601 and was buried at St Mary's Church, Chiddingstone. There cast iron grave slab in Richard's memory in Chiddingstone Church which is one of the earliest known, made locally when iron making was an important industry in the Weald.

Richard and Anne had three sons and a daughter:

1. Henry, his heir, baptised on 11 December 1586 in Chiddingstone, married Suan Lambe of Staplehurst Kent, and died in 1647.
2. Margaret, married 4 October 1608, to Edward Moody.
3. Silvester, of the Inner Temple, filacer of Kent, Sussex, and Surrey, baptised 25 January 1589, died unmarried.
4. Thomas, of Shoreham, Kent, baptised 11 June 1592, buried at Chiddingstone, 27 March 1627, married in 1614, Frances, daughter of John Reeves, of London, and by her (who married secondly, John Seyliard, and died in 1650) left four daughters, his coheirs.

== Posterity ==
Richard Streatfeild is recognised as the one who established the financial base of the Streatfeild family in Chiddingstone. His descendants include:

- Henry Streatfeild (1706–1762), substantial British landowner
- Thomas Streatfeild (1777–1848), renowned antiquarian and churchman in the early 19th century
- Richard Streatfeild (cricketer) (1833–1877), English cricketer
- Rev. William Champion Streatfeild (1839-1912), 19th century clergyman
- Alexander Streatfeild-Moore (1863–1940), English cricketer
- William Champion Streatfeild (1865–1929), Anglican Bishop of Lewes for a brief period in the second quarter of the 20th century
- Richard Alexander Streatfeild (1866-1919), English musicologist and critic
- Edward Champion Streatfeild (1870-1932), English cricketer
- Philip Streatfeild (1879–1915), English painter and bohemian
- Sidney Streatfeild (1894–1966), Scottish Unionist Party politician
- Ruth Gervis (1894–1988), artist, art teacher and illustrator of children's books
- Noel Streatfeild (1895–1986), author, most famous for her children's books
- Geoffrey Streatfeild (born 1975), English actor

His great grandson Henry Streatfeild (1639-1719) converted the family home High Street House from a house in the High Street to the Restoration style that it is now.
