= Streatfeild =

Streatfeild or Streatfield is a surname originating from the name of a lost village near Robertsbridge, East Sussex.

- Robert Streatfeild (1514–1599), from Chiddingstone, Kent and earliest known ancestor of many lines of Streatfeild and Streatfield from Kent, Surrey and Sussex
- Alexander Streatfeild-Moore (1863–1940), English cricketer
- David Streatfield, historian of landscape architecture, professor in the Department of Landscape Architecture at the University of Washington
- Geoffrey Streatfeild (judge) (1897–1979), English High Court judge
- Geoffrey Streatfeild (born 1975), English actor
- Henry Streatfeild (landowner) (1706–1762), substantial British landowner
- Noel Streatfeild (1895–1986), British author, known for her children's books
- Ruth Gervis (née Streatfeild) (1894-19??), sister to Noel, British illustrator
- Philip Streatfeild (1879–1915), English painter and bohemian
- Richard Streatfeild (1559–1601), British iron master from Kent
- Richard Streatfeild (cricketer) (1833–1877), English cricketer
- R. A. Streatfeild (1866–1919), English musicologist and critic
- Sidney Streatfeild (1894–1966), Scottish Unionist Party politician
- Simon Streatfeild (1929–2019), British-Canadian violist and conductor
- Thomas Streatfeild (1777–1848), British antiquarian and churchman
- William Champion Streatfeild (1865–1929), briefly Anglican Bishop of Lewes, father of Ruth and Noel
