= Robert Streatfeild =

English ironmaster (1514–1599)

Robert Streatfeild (1514 - March 1599) of Chiddingstone, Kent is the earliest known ancestor to which most known Streatfeilds and Streatfields can trace their ancestry, and the progenitor of the Streatfeild family.

== Origins ==
Robert Streatfeild was born in 1514. He lived all his life, as far as is known, in the village of Chiddingstone, in the Weald of Kent. He therefore grew up at the height of Henry VIII’s reign when Anne Boleyn was living at nearby Hever Castle. There is no record of his parents, though it is probable that his ancestors had been in the area for several generations.

== Occupation ==
Robert was known as an ironmaster. The Weald was the centre of the medieval iron industry, which seems to have been the economic base of both the village as a whole and the Streatfeild family. He laid the foundation for the family's involvement in the iron industry in which his grandson, Richard, made his fortune.

== Family ==
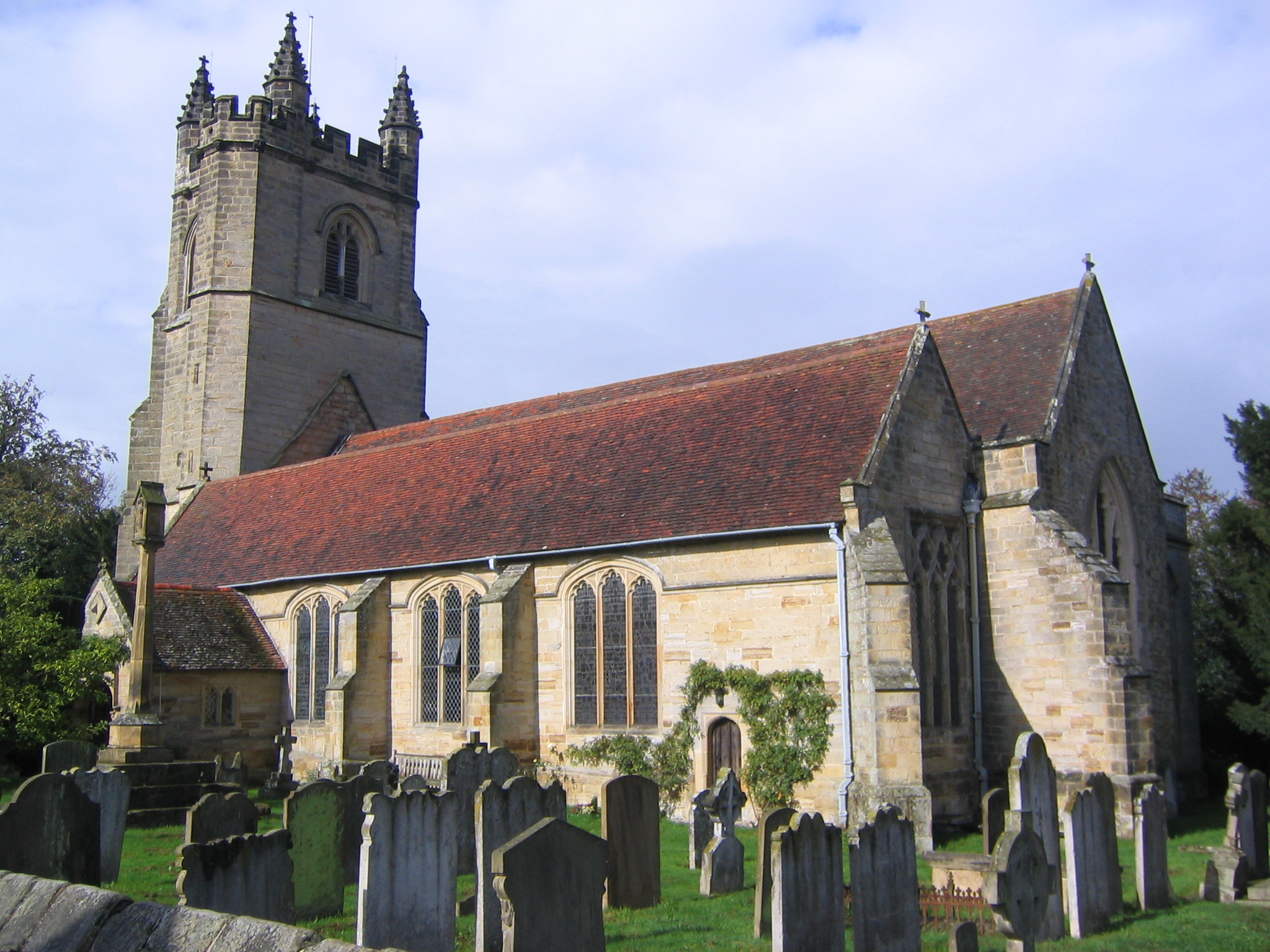
St Mary's Church, Chiddingstone where Robert Streatfeild and many of his descendants were buried - there are many Streatfeild memorials in the church

Robert married a daughter of Richard Rivers, steward of Edward Stafford, 3rd Duke of Buckingham, possibly called Joan. Most records only talk of her as the sister of Sir John Rivers, who was Lord Mayor of London in 1573. She was born in 1520 in Penshurst, Kent. This marriage probably reflects that Robert was already upwardly mobile. Robert died in March 1559 and was buried in Chiddingstone on 16 March.

Robert and Joan had two sons, Henry and Richard.

Henry Streatfeild was born in 1535 in Chiddingstone. He died on 29 December 1598 in Chiddingstone. He married Alice Moody about 1535 in Chiddingstone.

Richard Streatfeild was a yeoman of Cransted in Chiddingstone and of Chested in Penshurst. He was born about 1540 in Chiddingstone and died on 4 December 1584, and was buried in Chiddingstone.

== Posterity ==
Robert Streatfeild is recognised as the common ancestor of most living Streatfeilds and Streatfields. There are still direct descendants of his living in Chiddingstone.

Robert Streatfeild's descendants include:

- Richard Streatfeild (1559–1601), who established the financial basis for the family
- Henry Streatfeild (1706–1762), substantial British landowner
- Richard Streatfeild (cricketer) (1833–1877), English cricketer
- Alexander Streatfeild-Moore (1863–1940), English cricketer
- Edward Champion Streatfeild (1870–1932), English cricketer
- Geoffrey Streatfeild (born 1975), English actor
- Noel Streatfeild (1895–1986), author, most famous for her children's books
- Philip Streatfeild (1879–1915), English painter and bohemian
- Richard Streatfeild (cricketer) (1833–1877), English cricketer
- Sidney Streatfeild (1894–1966), Scottish Unionist Party politician
- Thomas Streatfeild (1777–1848), renowned antiquarian and churchman in the early 19th century
- Rev. William Champion Streatfeild (1839–1912), 19th century clergyman
- William Champion Streatfeild (1865–1929), Anglican Bishop of Lewes for a brief period in the second quarter of the 20th century

All his known descendants to the end of World War 1 are listed on the website "The Streatfeilds of Kent"

In July 2014 a significant group of his direct descendants met for a memorial service in St Mary's Church, Chiddingstone, followed by a get together at Chiddingstone Castle, which was the home of many generations of Streatfeilds, having been expanded by Henry Streatfeild (1639–1709) from a house in the High Street to the Restoration style that it is now.
