= Streatfeild family =

Family

Streatfeild
- Minor nobility and landed gentry
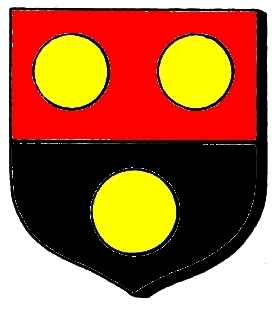
- Arms of the Streatfeild family: Per fess gules and sable, three bezants
- Country: Kingdom of England, Kingdom of Great Britain, United Kingdom
- Origin: Chiddingstone
- Founded: Early 16th century
- Founder: Robert Streatfeild
- Seat: Hoath House, Chiddingstone Hoath
- Historic seat: Chiddingstone Castle

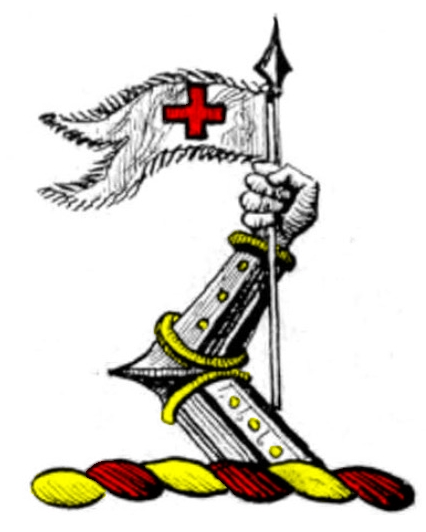
One version of the Streatfeild crest

The Streatfeilds, Streatfields or Stretfields are an aristocratic English family of the landed gentry, from Chiddingstone, Kent. The family are traceable to the early 16th century and are a possible cadet branch of the Noble House of Stratford. They were significant landowners in Sussex, Surrey and Kent, and instrumental in shaping those counties throughout the 17th and 18th centuries. From the early 16th century until 1900 the family seat was Chiddingstone Castle, the family later sold the castle to Lord Astor in 1938. The family moved to Hoath House in Chiddingstone Hoath (a hamlet in the parish of Chiddingstone) in 1910.

== History ==
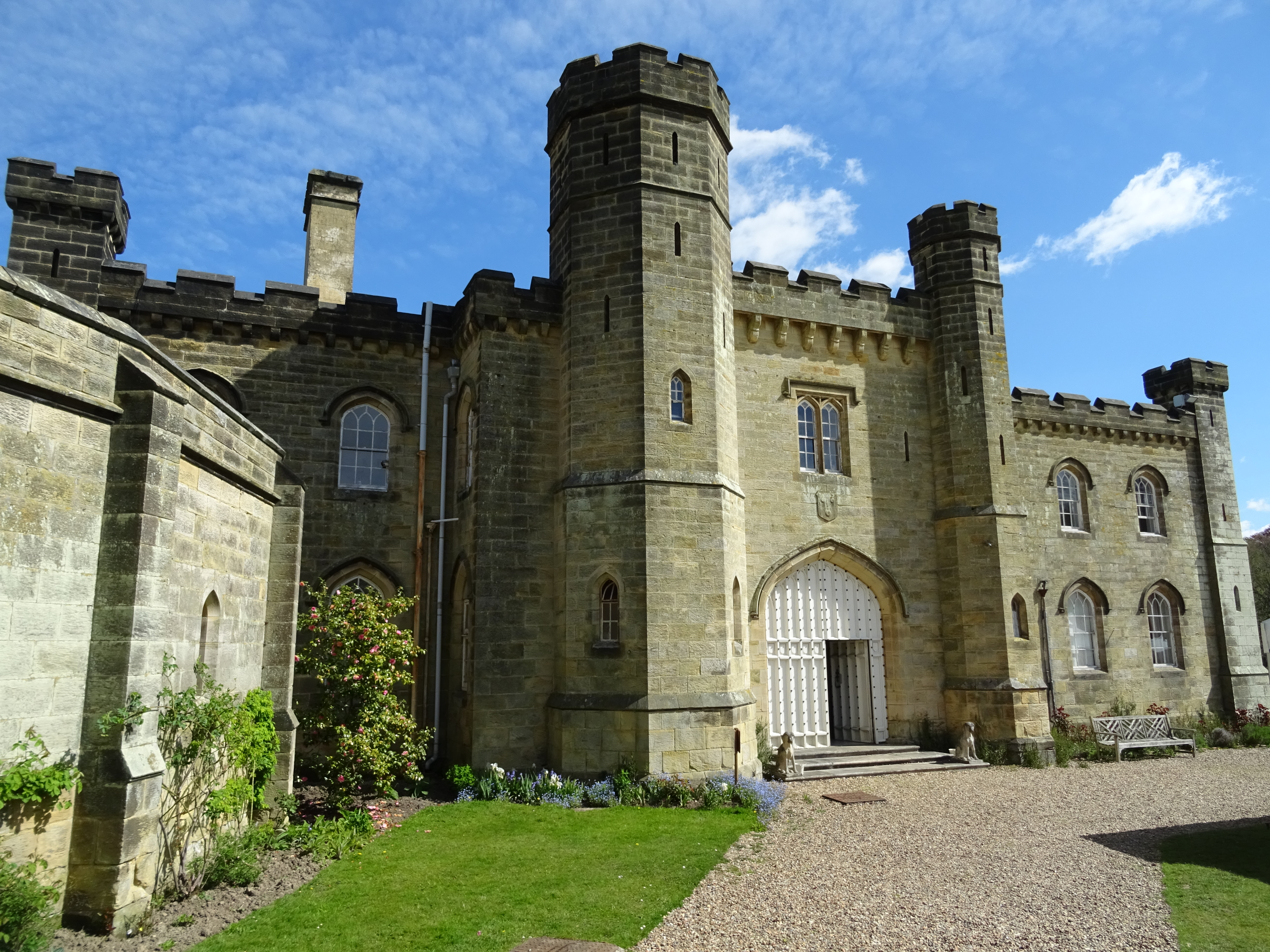
Chiddingstone Castle

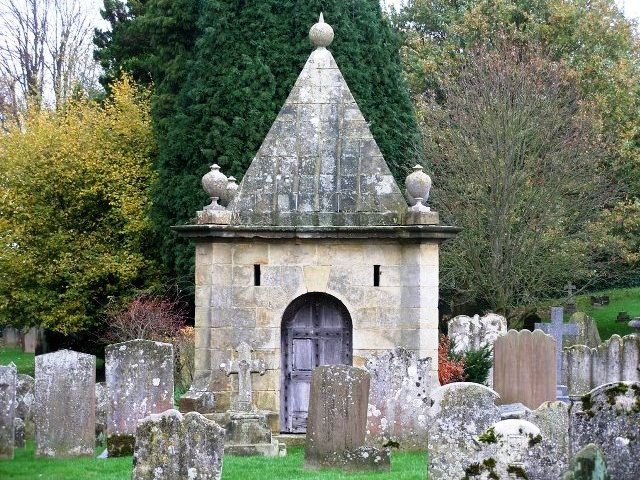
The Streatfeild Family Vault at St Mary's Church in Chiddingstone

The Streatfeild family were major landowners in the area surrounding Chiddingstone, starting in 1584. The Streatfields grew their holdings in Chiddingstone until they owned much of land in and around the village. Their seat was at Chiddingstone Castle which was in their possession from the 16th century until the family sold the castle to Lord Astor in 1938, though they had vacated the castle by 1900. In the early 1800s Henry Streatfeild (son of Henry Streatfeild) changed the village significantly, diverting the road to prevent access on to his estate, demolishing some buildings and in their place redeveloped the land into the formal gardens and ponds that remain today as well as remodeling the family owned red brick manor house (High Street House) into Chiddingstone Castle.

== Notable members ==
Robert Streatfeild (1514 – March 1599) is claimed as the common ancestor of most living Streatfeilds and Streatfields.

- Henry Streatfeild (1706–1762), substantial British landowner
- Alexander Streatfeild-Moore (1863–1940), English cricketer
- Edward Champion Streatfeild (1870–1932), English cricketer
- Philip Streatfeild (1879–1915), English painter and bohemian
- Richard Streatfeild (1559–1601), iron master who established the financial basis for the family
- Richard Streatfeild (1833–1877), English cricketer
- Sidney Streatfeild (1894–1966), Scottish Unionist Party politician
- Thomas Streatfeild (1777–1848), renowned antiquarian and churchman
- Rev. William Champion Streatfeild (1839–1912), clergyman
- Sir Henry Streatfeild (1857–1938), British Army officer and courtier who served as the commanding officer of the Grenadier Guards, and was Equerry to Edward VII from 1908 until the King's death in 1910, he was then Private Secretary and Equerry to Queen Alexandra from 1910 until her death in 1925
- William Champion Streatfeild (1865–1929), Anglican Bishop of Lewes
- Noel Streatfeild (1895–1986), author, most famous for her children's books
- Ruth Gervis (1894–1988), artist, art teacher and illustrator of children's books, most famously Ballet Shoes, written by her sister, Noel Streatfeild. She was also a founding member of Sherborne Museum, Dorset.
- Geoffrey Streatfeild (1975-), actor in film, television, stage and radio.

== Possible Stratford descent ==
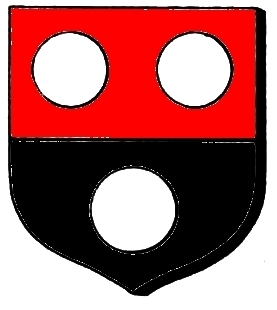
Stratford
Per fess gules and sable, three plates

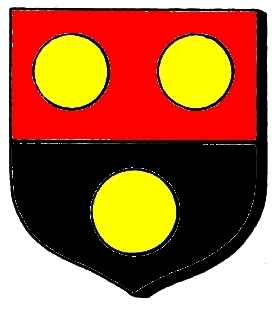
Streatfield
Per fess gules and sable, three bezants

The House of Stratford has a remarkably similar coat of arms attributed to them in the former half of the 14th century. This could be seen as evidence that the Streatfields, though their line cannot be traced beyond the 1500s, are in fact a cadet branch of the Stratford family, the name having been corrupted at some point prior to the 16th century.

== Reunion ==
In July 2014 a significant number of direct descendants of Robert Streatfeild met for a memorial service in St Mary's Church, Chiddingstone, followed by a gathering at Chiddingstone Castle, home of many generations of Streatfeilds (having been expanded by Henry Streatfeild (1639–1709) from a house in the High Street to the Restoration style that it is now).
