= Henry Streatfeild =

Henry Streatfeild may refer to:

- Henry Streatfeild (landowner) (1706–1762), substantial British landowner
- Henry Streatfeild (courtier) (1857–1938), British Army officer and courtier
