= The Way of All Flesh =

1903 semi-autobiographical novel by Samuel Butler

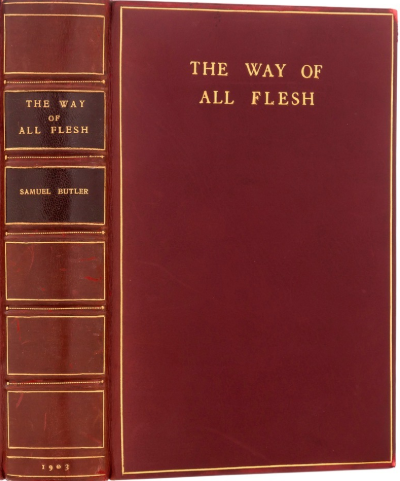
- Spine and front cover of the 1903 first edition
- Author: Samuel Butler
- Language: English
- Genre: Semi-autobiographical novel Social criticism
- Set in: England, c. 1765–1863
- Publisher: Grant Richards
- Publication date: 1903
- Publication place: United Kingdom
- Media type: Print (hardback & paperback)
- Pages: 423
- OCLC: 8742883
- Dewey Decimal: 823.8
- LC Class: PR4349 .B7
- Text: The Way of All Flesh at Wikisource

The Way of All Flesh (originally titled Ernest Pontifex or the Way of All Flesh) is a semi-autobiographical novel by Samuel Butler that attacks Victorian-era hypocrisy. Written between 1873 and 1884, it traces four generations of the Pontifex family. Butler dared not publish it during his lifetime, but when it was published posthumously in 1903 as The Way of All Flesh it was accepted as part of the general reaction against Victorianism. Butler's first literary executor, R. A. Streatfeild, made substantial changes to Butler's manuscript. The original manuscript was first published in 1964 as Ernest Pontifex or the Way of All Flesh by Houghton Mifflin Company, Boston, edited by Daniel F. Howard.

The title is a quotation from the Douay–Rheims Bible's translation of a Biblical Hebrew expression that is literally translated "to go the way of all the earth" and which signifies "to die". It is found in the First Book of Kings: "I am going the way of all flesh: take thou courage and shew thyself a man." (1 Kings 2.2).

In 1998, the Modern Library ranked The Way of All Flesh twelfth on its list of the 100 best English-language novels of the 20th century.

== Main characters ==
=== Pontifex family ===
==== First generation ====
- "Old" John Pontifex (16 August 1727 – 8 February 1812)
  - Ruth Pontifex (13 October 1727 – 10 January 1811; wife of Old Pontifex; married 1750).

==== Second generation ====
- George Pontifex (c. 1765–1838; son of Old John and Ruth Pontifex; married c. 1797 to unnamed woman who died 1805)

==== Third generation ====
- Eliza (1798–18??; George Pontifex's eldest child; never marries)
- Maria (1799–18??; George's second child; never marries)
- John (c. 1801–18??; George's third child; marries and has unnamed son early 1837)
- Theobald (1802–1881; George's fourth child; marries Christina Allaby July 1831; has 3 children)
  - Christina Pontifex, née Allaby (wife of Theobald Pontifex; married July 1831; died c. 1863)
- Alethea (1805–1850; George's fifth child; loves Overton but never marries him)

==== Fourth generation ====
- Ernest, the central character (born 6 September 1835; eldest child of Theobald and Christina Pontifex)
  - Ellen, Ernest's wife (born c. 1831; housemaid of Theobald and Christina; likely pregnant by John the coachman, whom she wed in 1851; separated; married bigamously to Ernest late 1850s; annulled 1862)
- Joseph (born 1836; second child of Theobald and Christina; married between 1875 and 1876)
- Charlotte (born 1837; third child of Theobald and Christina; married between 1876 and 1882)

==== Fifth generation ====
- Alice (born September 1860; illegitimate daughter of Ellen and Ernest; married Jack Rollings (born 1855) at age 38 and has son)
- Georgie (born late 1861; illegitimate son of Ernest and Ellen; marries and has children)

=== Others ===
- Dr Skinner (Ernest's teacher)
- John (Theobald & Christina's family coachman; impregnates Ellen and marries her 15 August 1851, but later separates due to her drunkenness)
- Mr Edward Overton, the narrator (born 1802, loves Alethea Pontifex but never marries her; trustee of her estate; godfather to Ernest)

== Plot summary ==
The story is narrated by Overton, godfather to the central character.

The novel takes its beginnings in the late eighteenth and early nineteenth centuries to trace Ernest's emergence from previous generations of the Pontifex family. John Pontifex was a carpenter; his son George rises in the world to become a publisher; George's son Theobald, pressed by his father to become a minister, is manipulated into marrying Christina, the daughter of a clergyman; the main character Ernest Pontifex is the eldest son of Theobald and Christina.

The author depicts an antagonistic relationship between Ernest and his hypocritical and domineering parents. His aunt Alethea is aware of this relationship, but dies before she can fulfil her aim of counteracting the parents' malign influence on the boy. However, shortly before her death she secretly passes a small fortune into Overton's keeping, with the agreement that once Ernest is twenty-eight, he can receive it.

As Ernest develops into a young man, he travels a bumpy theological road, reflecting the divisions and controversies in the Church of England in the Victorian era. Easily influenced by others at university, he starts out as an Evangelical Christian, and soon becomes a clergyman. He then falls for the lures of the High Church (and is duped out of much of his own money by a fellow clergyman). He decides that the way to regenerate the Church of England is to live among the poor, but the results are, first, that his faith in the integrity of the Bible is severely damaged by a conversation with one of the poor he was hoping to convert, and, second, that under the pressures of poverty and theological doubt, he attempts a sexual assault on a woman he has incorrectly believed to be of loose morals.

This assault leads to a prison term. His parents disown him. His health deteriorates.

As he recovers he learns how to tailor and decides to make this his profession once out of prison. He rejects Christianity as superstition. He marries Ellen, a former housemaid of his parents; they have two children and set up shop together in the second-hand clothing industry. However, in due course he discovers that Ellen is both a bigamist and an alcoholic. Overton at this point intervenes and pays Ellen a stipend, and she happily leaves with another for America. He gives Ernest a job, and takes him on a trip to Continental Europe.

When Ernest reaches the age of 28 he receives his aunt Alethea's gift. He returns to the family home until his mother's death; his father's influence over him wanes as Theobald's own position as a clergyman is reduced in relative stature, though to the end Theobald deliberately finds small ways to annoy him. Ernest becomes the author of controversial literature.

== Critical reputation ==
The writer George Orwell praised the novel and called it "a great book because it gives an honest picture of the relationship between father and son, and it could do that because Butler was a truly independent observer, and above all because he was courageous. He would say things that other people knew but didn't dare to say. And finally there was his clear, simple, straightforward way of writing, never using a long word where a short one will do."

A. A. Milne, author of Winnie-the-Pooh, wrote about it in his essay "A Household Book", published in a collection of his essays, Not That It Matters: "Once upon a time I discovered Samuel Butler; not the other two, but the one who wrote The Way of All Flesh, the second-best novel in the English language. I say the second-best, so that, if you remind me of Tom Jones, or The Mayor of Casterbridge, or any other that you fancy, I can say, of course, that one is the best."
