= Chiddingstone Hoath =

Hamlet in Kent, England

Coordinates: 51.162°N 0.141°E

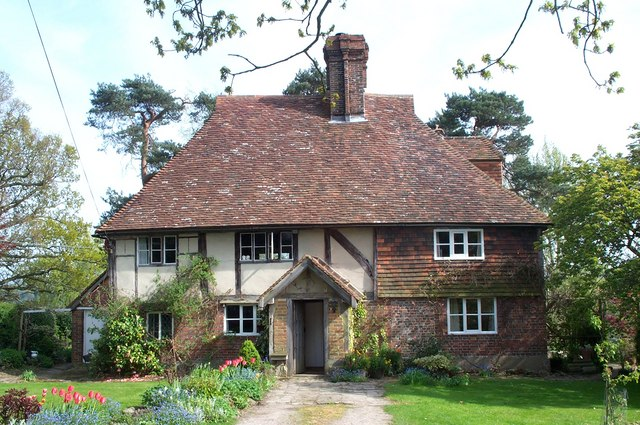
- Oakenden Farmhouse, Chiddingstone Hoath

- Location within Kent
- Civil parish: Chiddingstone
- District: Sevenoaks
- Shire county: Kent
- Region: South East
- Country: England
- Sovereign state: United Kingdom
- Post town: EDENBRIDGE
- Postcode district: TN8
- Police: Kent
- Fire: Kent
- Ambulance: South East Coast
- UK Parliament: Tonbridge

Chiddingstone Hoath is a hamlet in the Sevenoaks District of Kent, England. Notable buildings include Hoath House, and Stonewall Park, for some time home of the Meade-Waldo family. It lies within the High Weald Area of Outstanding Natural Beauty. It is included in the civil parish of Chiddingstone.

It was visited by Charles Rennie Mackintosh in 1910.
