= Henry Streatfeild (courtier) =

British landowner and secretary to Queen Alexandra

Colonel Sir Henry Streatfeild GCVO CB CMG JP DL
- Colonel Sir Henry Streatfeild
- Born: 4 January 1857
- Died: 25 July 1938 (aged 81)
- Military career
- Allegiance: United Kingdom
- Branch: British Army
- Service years: 1876–1904; 1914–1919
- Rank: Colonel
- Unit: Grenadier Guards
- Commands: Grenadier Guards
- Conflicts: Second Boer War; First World War
- Awards: Knight Grand Cross of the Royal Victorian Order; Companion of the Order of the Bath; Companion of the Order of St Michael and St George

Colonel Sir Henry Streatfeild, GCVO, CB, CMG, JP, DL (1857–1938) was a British Army officer and courtier who served as the commanding officer of the Grenadier Guards, and was Equerry to Edward VII from 1908 until the King's death in 1910. He was then Private Secretary and Equerry to Queen Alexandra from 1910 until her death in 1925.

== Early life ==
Born on 4 January 1857, he was the son of Colonel Henry Dorrien Streatfeild, JP, DL (1825–1889), of Chiddingstone, Kent, and his wife Marion Henrietta, daughter of Oswald Smith, of Blendon Hall, Kent. Henry was born into the Streatfeild family, part of the landed gentry, the family had lived at Chiddingstone since the 16th century; his father had served as High Sheriff of Kent in 1882. Streatfeild attended Eton College before entering the Grenadier Guards in 1876.

== Career ==
=== Military ===
In 1883, he was appointed an aide-de-camp to the Governor-General of Canada, the 5th Marquess of Landsdowne, and in 1885 he was appointed Landsdowne's military secretary when the marquess became Viceroy of India. That year, he was also promoted to the rank of captain. Leaving Landsdowne's service in 1891, he was appointed aide-de-camp to he Lord Lieutenant of Ireland, the 2nd Baron Houghton, in 1892. From 1895 to 1899, he was appointed assistant military secretary to Field Marshal Lord Roberts (who had been the Commander-in-Chief, Ireland, for the latter part of Houghton's lieutenancy). On the outbreak of the Second Boer War in 1899, Streatfeild was appointed aide-de-camp to Lieutenant-General Lord Methuen. He then returned to Lord Roberts's service as his private secretary between 1901 and 1904 (when Roberts was Commander-in-Chief of the Forces). Promoted to the rank of Lieutenant-Colonel during the war, he was made a brevet Colonel in 1904 and retired that year from the army. During the First World War, he was appointed Lieutenant-Colonel commanding the Grenadier Guards (1914–1919).

=== Royal service ===
In 1908, Streatfeild was appointed Equerry to the King. When George V succeeded to the throne in 1910, he made Streatfeild an Extra Equerry and appointed Private Secretary and Equerry to his mother, Queen Alexandra. He served in that office until 1925. Having been appointed a Member of the Royal Victorian Order in 1902, he was promoted Commander in 1912, Knight Commander in 1916 and Knight Grand Cross in the 1926 New Year Honours. He was also appointed a Companion of the Order of the Bath in 1911 and a Companion of the Order of St Michael and St George in 1918.

=== Other appointments and retirement ===
Streatfeild also held other public appointments. He chaired the Kent County Territorial Association, was a governor of Wellington College and, from 1901, served as a deputy lieutenant and a magistrate of Kent. He died on 25 July 1938; he was survived by his wife, Lady Florence Anson (daughter of the 2nd Earl of Lichfield) and their only child, Colonel Henry Sidney John Streatfeild, DSO.
