= Bore Place =

Country seat

Coordinates: 51°13′13.4″N 0°9′20″E

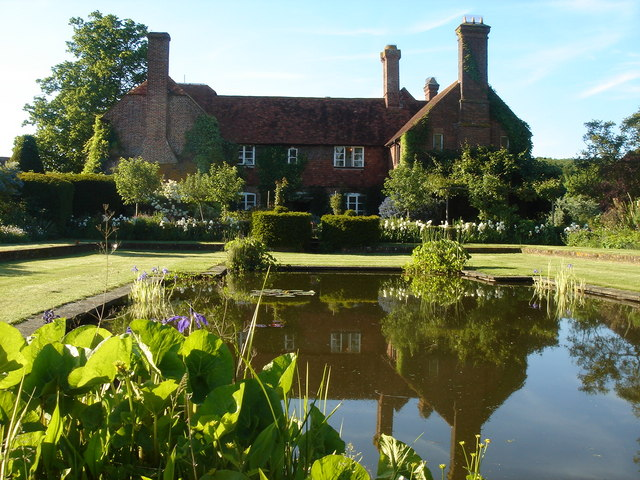

Bore Place (also Boar Place) was the country seat of the manor of Milbroke in Kent. The manor house was constructed in around 1745.

It was originally named after the Bore family who owned the estate in the reign of Henry III. It subsequently passed through the Alphew, Read, Willoughby, Hyde and Streatfield families. It is now owned by the Commonwork Trust – a charity which runs the estate as a dairy farm, market garden, conference centre and education facility.
