= Richard Streatfeild (cricketer) =

English cricketer

Richard John Streatfeild (7 November 1833 – 22 March 1877) was an English amateur cricketer who played in six first-class cricket matches during the mid-19th century.

Streatfeild was born at Chiddingstone in Kent in 1833, part of the influential Streatfeild family which was established in the village by Robert Streatfeild in the 16th century. He was the fourth son of Lieutenant-colonel Henry Streatfeild and Maria Dorrien-Magens.

Streatfeild matriculated at Christ Church, Oxford in 1853. He is known then to have been in business as farmer, and worked as the secretary to William Nevill, 1st Marquess of Abergavenny. Whilst a student he played cricket for the college team and for the University team in minor matches and made his first-class debut for the Gentlemen of Kent in 1854, playing against the Gentlemen of England at Lord's. He played in a total of six first-class matches between his debut and 1862, four for the Gentlemen of Kent, generally during Canterbury Cricket Week matches, and once for both Kent County Cricket Club, in 1856, and for the North in the North v South match in 1855. He played minor matches for the Gentlemen and for teams such as West Kent, Sevenoaks Vine and I Zingari.

Streatfeild married Harriet Elizabeth Armytage in 1858 and the couple had two children. They lived at Chested House in Penshurst in Kent. Streatfeild died in March 1877 at Eastbourne in Sussex at the age of 43.

== Bibliography ==
- Carlaw, Derek (2020). Kent County Cricketers, A to Z: Part One (1806–1914) (PDF). Cardiff: ACS.
