= Edward Streatfeild =

English cricketer

Edward Champion Streatfeild (16 June 1870 – 22 August 1932) was an English cricketer who played 38 matches of first-class cricket between 1890 and 1893.

Streatfeild was born in Nutfield, Surrey, son of Alexander Streatfeild (1837–1887) and Helen McNeill (1838–1902). He was a member of the Streatfeild family, a well known family in Kent. He was the first cousin of William Streatfeild, bishop of Lewes, and his grandmother, Hannah Fry, was the daughter of the prison reformer, Elizabeth Fry. He was educated at Charterhouse School and Pembroke College, Cambridge.

In all, Streatfeild played in nine first-class cricket matches for Surrey County Cricket Club between 1890 and 1892, scoring 185 runs at an average of 15.41. He also played first-class cricket for Cambridge University and Marylebone Cricket Club. His highest score in first-class cricket was 145 for Cambridge University (Past and Present) against the Australian team of 1890; he hit so brilliantly that he made the runs in 110 minutes.

His brother Alexander Streatfeild-Moore (1863–1940), who was born in Kent, also played first-class cricket for Kent County Cricket Club between 1885 and 1888.

After some years as a teacher, he worked as an Inspector of schools from 1898 to 1919.

Edward Streatfeild died on 22 August 1932 at Esperance, Eastbourne, Sussex, aged 62.
