= Sophia Streatfeild =

English woman known from Hester Thrale's diary (c. 1755–1835)

Sophia Streatfeild (c. 1755–1835) was an English woman best known from the diary of Hester Thrale.

She was baptised on 9 May 1755 in Soho, the elder daughter of Henry Streatfeild and his wife Anne, née Sidney, the illegitimate daughter of Jocelyn Signey, 7th Earl of Leicester. She was tutored in Latin and Greek by Arthur Collier, the same tutor as Hester Thrale. Streatfeild owned a collection of Greek literature and her knowledge of Greek was acknowledged by Samuel Johnson. Thrale and Streatfeild became reacquainted in 1777 on a holiday to Brighton.

In 1779, Thrale wrote that her husband, Henry Thrale, had fallen 'really and seriously' in love with Streatfeild. Thrale also reported that other men, including Beilby Portus, bishop of Chester, and Fanny Burney’s father Charles Burney were in love with her.

Despite this, Streatfeild never married, and died on 30 November 1835.

Edward Burney’s drawings for Burney’s novel Evelina is thought to depict Sophia Streatfeild as Evelina.
