= Chiddingstone Castle =

Historic property in Kent, England

Coordinates: 51°11′09″N 0°08′33″E

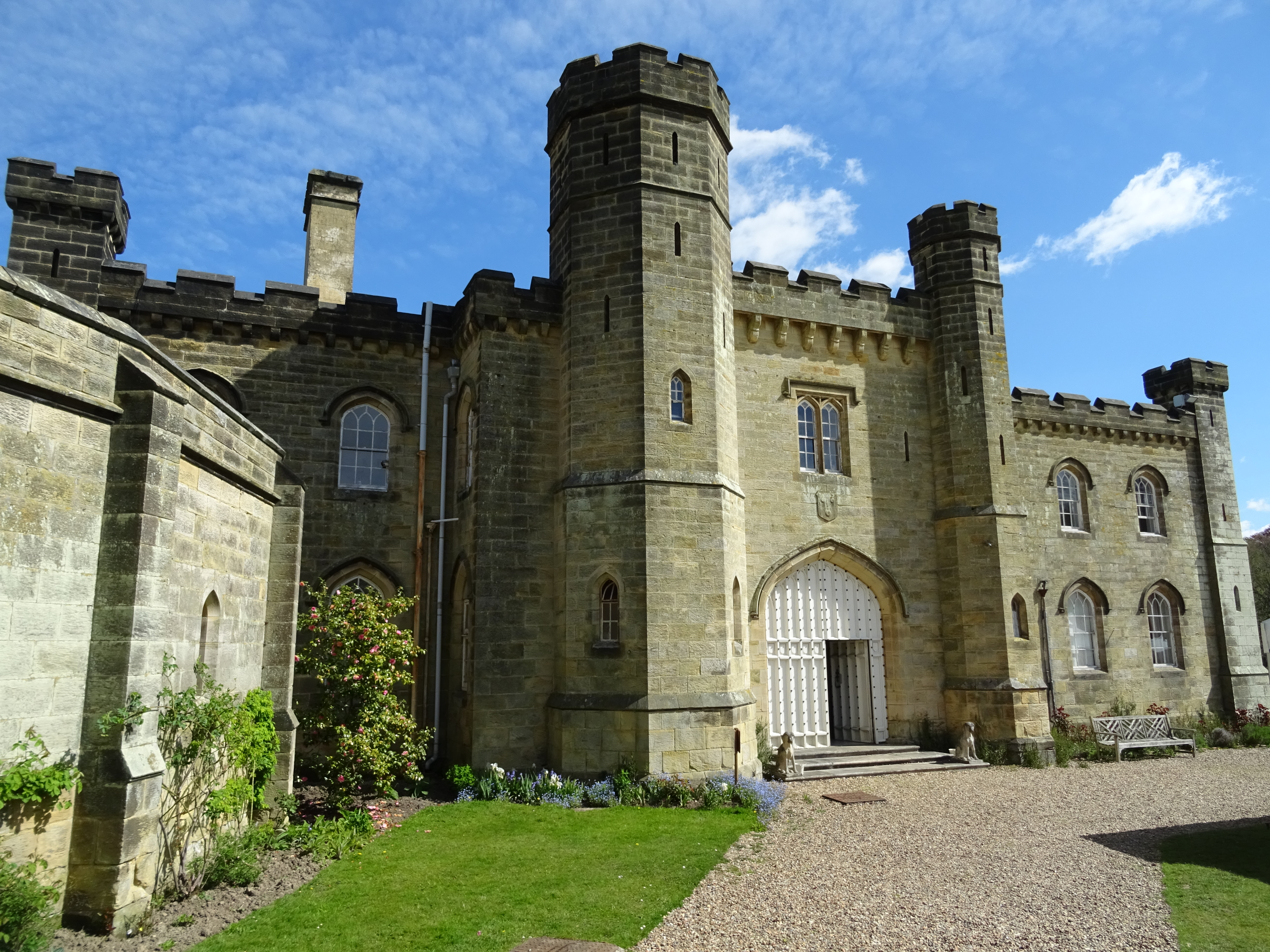
- Chiddingstone Castle gate
- Interactive map of the Chiddingstone Castle area

General information
- Architectural style: Neo-Gothic
- Year built: 16th century (original structure)
- Client: Streatfeild family

Technical details
- Grounds: 35 acres (14 hectares)

Design and construction
- Architect: Henry Edward Kendall (1829)

Listed Building – Grade II*
- Official name: Chiddingstone Castle
- Designated: 16 January 1975
- Reference no.: 1252483

National Register of Historic Parks and Gardens
- Official name: Chiddingstone Castle
- Designated: 20 December 1988
- Reference no.: 1000399

Chiddingstone Castle is situated in the village of Chiddingstone, near Edenbridge, Kent, England, 35 miles (56 kilometres) south-southeast of London and in the upper valley of the River Medway. The castle was built by the Streatfeild family and served as their seat from the early 16th century until the beginning of the 20th century when the family left the castle. The Streatfeilds sold the castle to Lord Astor in 1938.

Since 1977, the castle and its 35 acres (14 hectares) of grounds have been held in trust for the nation by the Denys Eyre Bower Bequest, and both are open to the public. Much of the current structure dates from the early 19th century, but incorporates elements of the earlier buildings on the same site.

== History ==
=== High Street House ===
The first significant building to occupy the site of the castle was a timber-framed dwelling, inhabited from the early 16th century by Richard Streatfeild, an iron master and wool merchant. Little remains of this first structure as, in 1679, Henry Streatfeild (1639–1719) had the house rebuilt in red brick in the Restoration style. The building was known as High Street House or High Street Mansion since it fronted the village high street. Remodelling of the house's grounds in the 19th century resulted in the current diversion of the road through the village.

=== Chiddingstone Castle ===
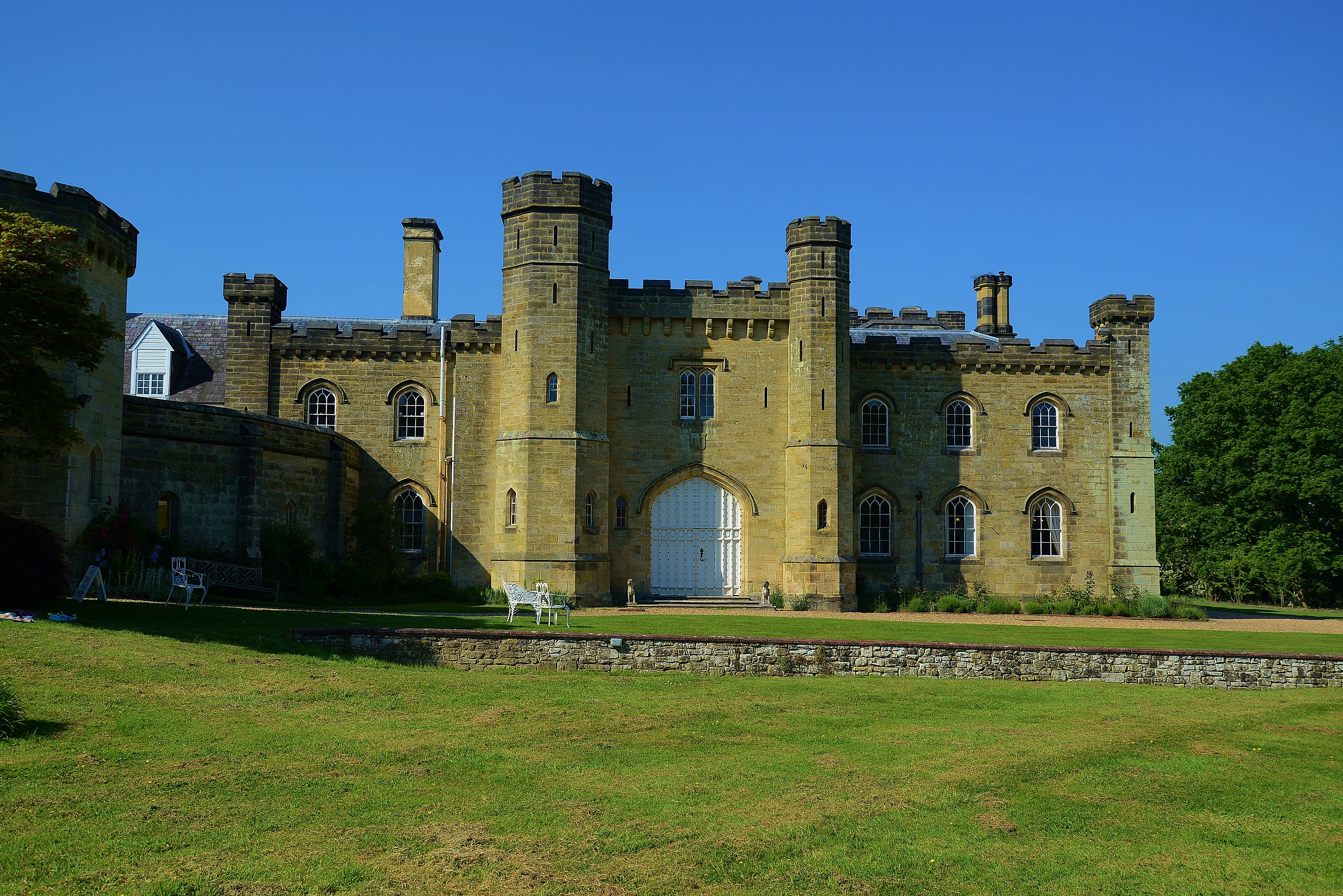
Chiddingstone Castle

In the early 19th century, Henry Streatfeild (1757–1829), the son of Henry Streatfeild (1706–1762) and Lady Anne Sidney, commissioned William Atkinson to rebuild the house in the Gothic style however Atkinson's design was not completed and, in 1835, Streatfeild's son, also Henry Streatfeild (1784–1852), engaged the architect Henry Kendal to carry out further work. Although the Streatfields owned the house, now renamed Chiddingstone Castle, until it was sold to Lord Astor in 1938, the family did not live there after 1900. During the Second World War, the castle hosted members of the Canadian Forces before becoming Long Dene School until 1954.

=== Denys Eyre Bower ===
In 1955, the castle was purchased by Denys Eyre Bower (1905–1977), a former bank clerk and antiques dealer, in order to display his collections. Bower was born in Crich, Derbyshire and started collecting at a young age. Bower initially worked as a bank clerk before taking over Cavendish Hood antiques dealers in Baker Street, London in 1943. The redevelopment of Baker Street led to Bower moving to Chiddingstone Castle where he intended to show his collections to the public.

However, in 1957 Bower was convicted of attempted murder of his mistress, whom he shot, and attempted suicide and sentenced to life imprisonment. Released in 1962 after successful efforts by solicitor Ruth Eldridge to prove a miscarriage of justice, Bower returned to Chiddingstone Castle which, with the help of Eldridge and her sister Mary, he continued to open to visitors until his death in 1977.

=== Today ===
Bower left the castle and his collection to the nation and so upon his death the Denys Eyre Bower Bequest was formed. This trust continues to care for the castle and its collection, opening it to the public and providing a venue for weddings, and the current trustees include descendants of the Streatfeild family. The castle is a Grade II* listed building and the grounds, which contain further listed buildings including an orangery, are themselves included on the National Register of Historic Parks and Gardens. The Castle is an accredited museum, contains a tea-room serving refreshments and hosts a variety of events and activities throughout the year.

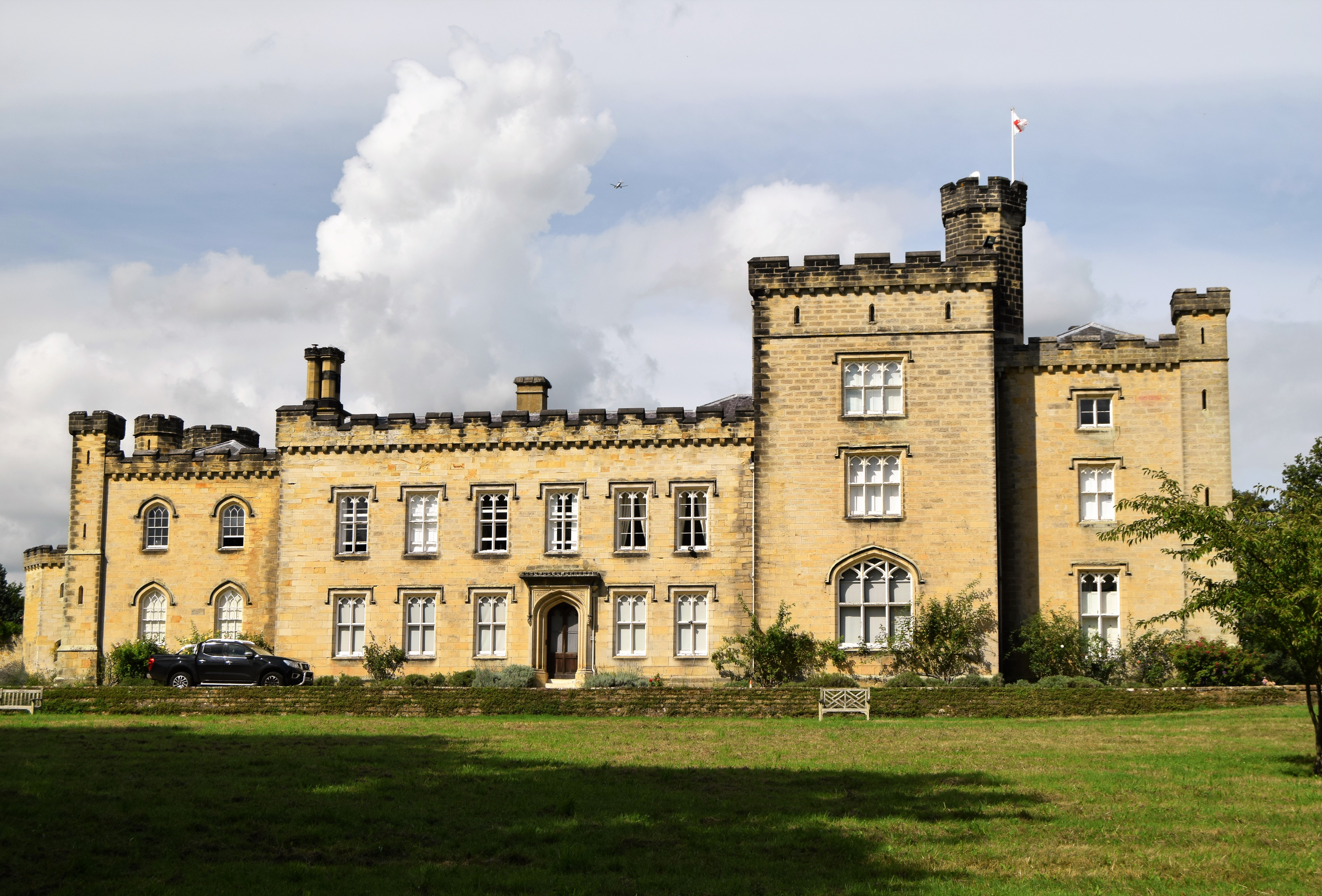
Chiddingstone Castle side

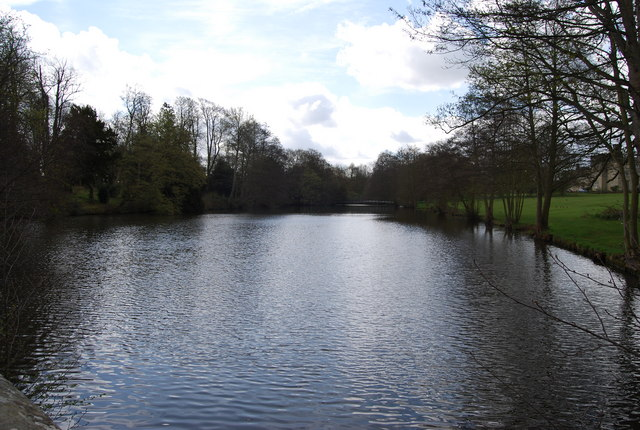
Chiddingstone Castle Lake, as viewed from the north

=== Fishing ===
The Castle lake measures around 3.5 hectares. It divides the village of Chiddingstone from the grounds of Chiddingstone Castle. It is naturally stocked with wild Carp, Bream and Perch. It held the record for the largest Bream for 37 years, from 1945.

== Collections ==
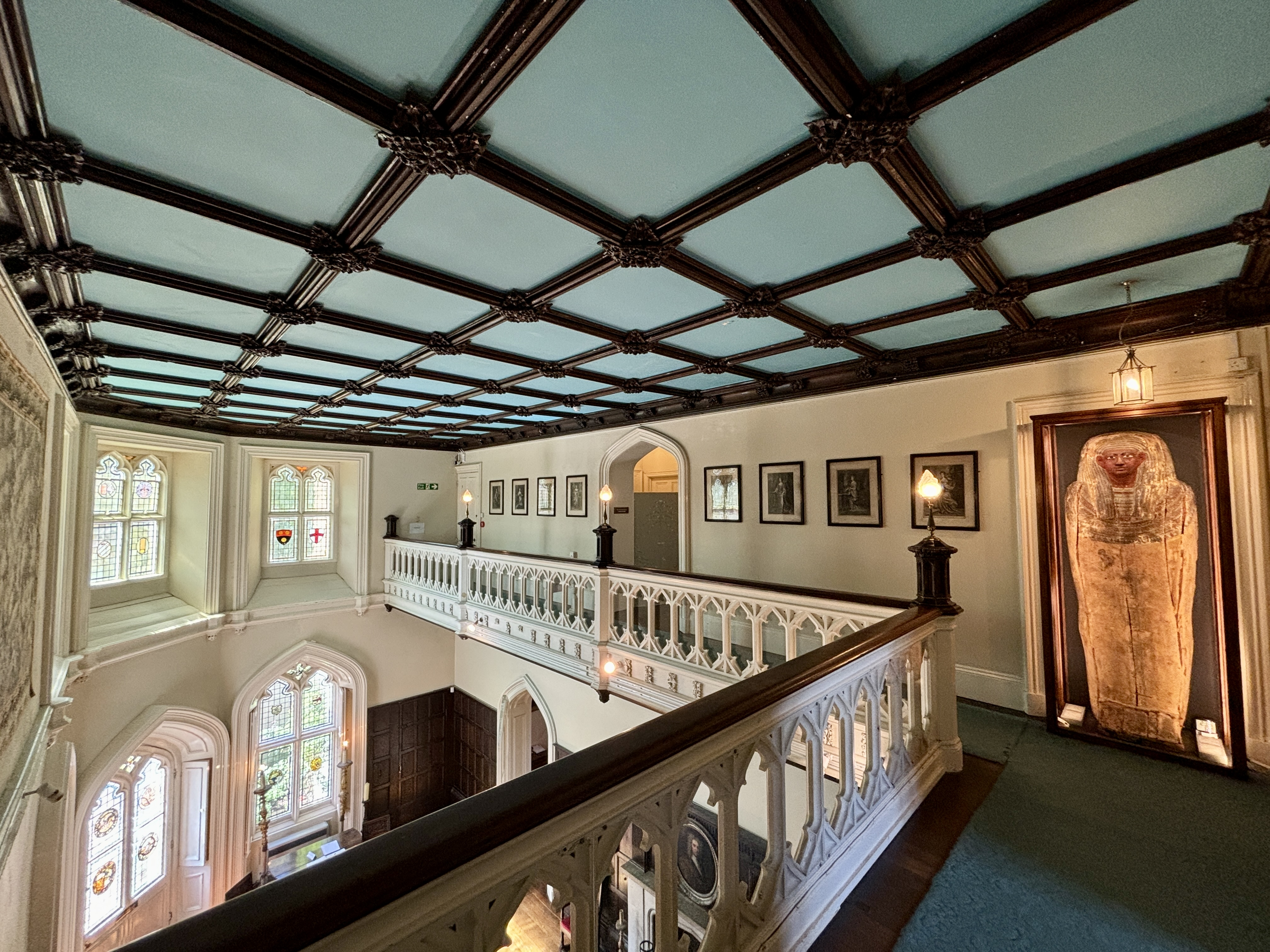
Interior

=== Japanese ===
Bower's decision to collect objects from Japan was inspired by his father's own interest in Chinese porcelain. The collection of lacquer is considered to be one of the most important in a private collection, whilst displays at the castle also feature swords, armour and haniwa figures.

=== Ancient Egyptian ===
The Ancient Egyptian collection spans the whole history of the civilisation and includes both grave goods, such as ushabti figures and amulets, and items from everyday life, including food and drink vessels. In 2013, items from the collection were lent to the Houston Museum of Natural Science for display in their Hall of Ancient Egypt.

=== Stuart and Jacobite ===
In British history, Bower was most interested in the House of Stuart and Jacobitism and was a member of the Royal Stuart Society. His collecting in this area included portraits of members of the House of Stuart, swords, objects with hidden Jacobite symbols and royal manuscripts. There is an extensive collection of antique books on the subject in the library, on display at the Castle.

=== Buddhist ===
As with other areas of his collecting, Bower's interest in objects relating to Buddhism was driven by personal reasons; Bower was a Buddhist. Despite this, the collection does not focus on any one particular school of Buddhist thought or on any particular country. Amongst items currently displayed at the castle are thangkas and images of Buddha.

=== Local history ===
In addition to Bower's collections, the castle's 19th-century kitchen still retains many of its original features, such as three cake ovens, and is used to display a collection of kitchen utensils and an ice chest, reflecting the fact that the castle once had an ice house. There is also a servants' hall and a servants' bedroom. The Castle also holds some archives of local history.
