= Sevenoaks Gravel Pits =

Protected area in Kent, England

Coordinates: 51.291°N 0.181°E

- Site of Special Scientific Interest
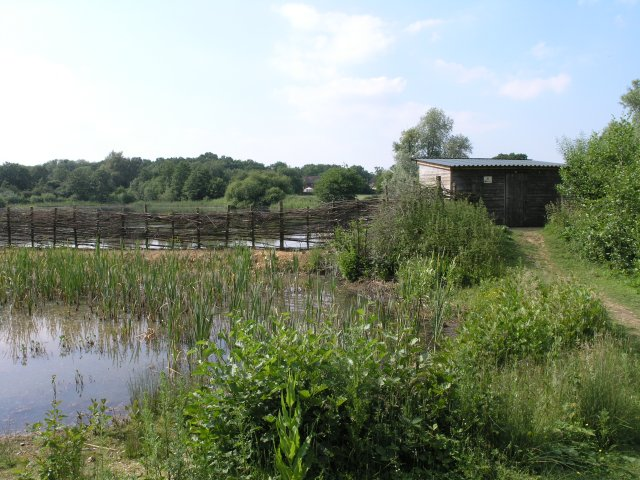
- Location of Sevenoaks Gravel Pits.
- Area of search: Kent
- Grid reference: TQ 522 569
- Interest: Biological
- Area: 73.7 hectares (182 acres)
- Notification date: 1989
- Location map: Magic Map

Sevenoaks Gravel Pits is a 73.7-hectare (182-acre) biological Site of Special Scientific Interest on the northern outskirts of Sevenoaks in Kent. It is managed by Kent Wildlife Trust as the Sevenoaks Wildlife Reserve and Jeffery Harrison Visitor Centre.

== History ==
The site was converted from gravel-pit to nature reserve by the Harrison family - particularly Jeffery Harrison, after whom the visitor centre is named. As such, the site is almost totally man-made - nearly all trees on the site were manually planted, and the lakes and ponds were created by excavating and flooding former gravel workings with water from the River Darent. As such, the site represented the first such conversion of a gravel-pit anywhere in the United Kingdom.

Large areas of gravel and sand were replaced with woodland, supporting birds such as woodpeckers, warblers and tits, as well as other migratory birds. These include siskins - a bird that comes in the winter months to feed on alder seeds.

Areas of the reserve have been left to mature and reach old age, with plenty of dead wood habitat for fungi and insects. In contrast, other sections see the trees are coppiced to create open areas and denser woodland with its own community of plants and animals. The reserve further includes five lakes and a mixed habitat of ponds, seasonally flooded pools, and reedbed; and the combination of wetland and woodland enables the reserve to support a diverse community of plants, fungi and animals. As of 2006, over two thousand species have been identified on the site.

== SSSI designation ==
According to the notification for the site, the interest of Sevenoaks Gravel Pits centres on its breeding bird populations. The combination of water features such as shallows, spits and islands, as well as the planting of trees and aquatic plants, have provided conditions suitable for both breeding and wintering birds. The water levels in the lake are managed so that islands and shallows are exposed during spring and summer, creating feeding and nesting areas for a variety of waders and water fowl including the little ringed plover, lapwing, moorhen, coot and great crested grebe. Large numbers of wildfowl regularly use the open water in the winter months such as the tufted duck, greylag and Canada geese.

Canada and greylag geese, alongside the mallard and tufted duck are the most numerous breeding species on the site, although wintering and passage wildfowl are also attracted including the pochard, shelduck, teal and shoveller. Equally, passage waders such as the greenshank and green sandpiper, as well as the uncommon little ringed plover, are regular breeding species on the site.

Song birds, including the whitethroat, reed, and sedge warblers can be found in the woodland and reed beds on the site, while sand martins - a species that has undergone major fluctuations in recent years - have a significant colony in a sand face towards the south of the site.

The Gravel Pits' SSSI notification also notes the growing botanical and entomological interest of the site, with thirteen species of Odonata (dragonflies) including the locally distributed downy-emerald dragonfly Cordulia aenea. Plants of note include small cud-weed Filago minima, dwarf elder Sambucus ebulus, and slender bird's-foot trefoil Lotus angustissimus.
