= William Champion Streatfeild (1839–1912) =

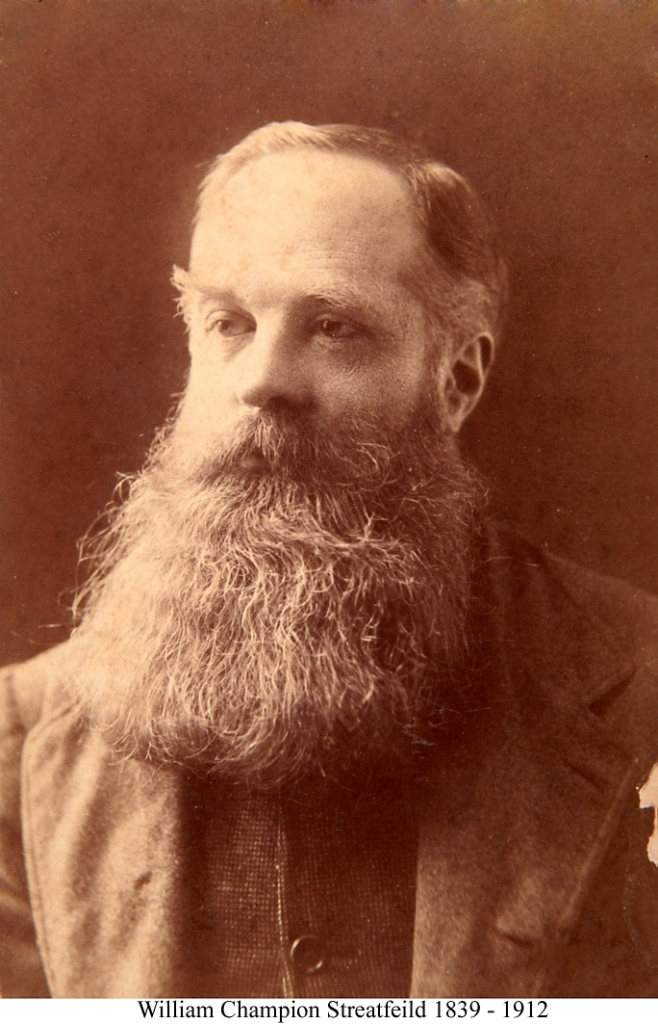
Rev William Champion Streatfeild portrait

Rev. William Champion Streatfeild MA (1839–1912) was an English clergyman and descendant of the historic Streatfeild family. In his retirement he lived at Chart’s Edge and Hoseyrigge, in Westerham Kent.

== Early life ==
William Champion Streatfeild was born on 11 August 1839 at East Ham, Essex where his father was a magistrate. He was the son of another William Champion Streatfeild and his wife Hannah Fry. His paternal grandfather was Rev Thomas Streatfeild who built Chart’s Edge near Westerham, which he later inherited. His maternal grandmother was the prison reformer Elizabeth Fry.

William was educated at Eton College and Trinity College, Cambridge, where he graduated with a B.A. in 1860 and M.A. in 1863.

== Churchman ==
William Champion Streatfeild’s whole career was in the Church of England. He was ordained a deacon in 1863 and a priest in 1864 at Canterbury.

His first curacy was at St Andrew’s, Croydon, Surrey in 1863. He was then Curate of Plaxtol, Kent from 1864-5.

Although originally from the south of England, his first two parishes were in the north east. His first parish was as Vicar of St Michael and All Angels, Howick, Northumberland from 1865 to 1878. He was then Rector of Holy Cross Church, Ryton-on-Tyne, Durham from 1878 to 1881, and was still there in April at the time of the 1881 census.

He then moved south to Kings Worthy, Hampshire, where he was Rector from 1881 to 1887 and finally he was Rector of St Albans, Frant, Sussex from 1887 to 1901, and was still rector at time of 1901 census. The 1901 census included 4 servants living in the household, namely Housemaid, Kitchen maid, Children’s nurse and Cook.

== Family ==
William married Selina Leveson-Gower on 23 August 1864, who was born on 29 February 1840 in Titsey, Surrey, the daughter of William Leveson-Gower of Titsey Place and Emily Doyle, and sister of politician Granville William Gresham Leveson-Gower. The Leveson-Gowers are a family of very considerable ancestry,

William and Selina had 8 sons and 2 daughters viz:

I. William Streatfeild born 1st Sept 1865 at Plaxtol, died 17 February 1929, Bishop of Lewes. He was the father of the popular children's author Noel Streatfeild.

II. Henry born 24 October 1866 in Howick, Northumberland, died in August 1950 in Isle of Wight, was in the Indian Civil Service

III. Grey born 19 November 1868 in Tolleshunt, Essex, died 8 June 1946, was an engineer in the Indian Public Works Department

IV. Granville born 11 March 1869 in Howick, Northumberland, died in September 1947, was an Architect

V. Claude born 9 August 1870 in Howick, Northumberland, died on 19 July 1951 at Symondsbury, was an ordained priest

VI. Roland born 28 December 1871 in Howick, Northumberland, died on 14 November 1952, was an electrical engineer and then an ordained priest

VII. George born 15 March 1875 in Howick, Northumberland, died 5 December 1946, was in the Indian Police

VIII. Albert Harold was born on 15 March 1878, died on 1 November 1934, was a captain in the army

I. Emily Diana born 1874 in Howick, Northumberland, died 26 July 1958

II. Sylvia was born on 5 January 1880 in Ryton-on-Tyne, died on 27 February 1960

William retired to his home at Chart's Edge near Westerham. He died on 8 August 1912 at his home at Hoseyrigge near Westerham, Kent. Selina died on 27 October 1916.
