= R. A. Streatfeild =

English musicologist and critic

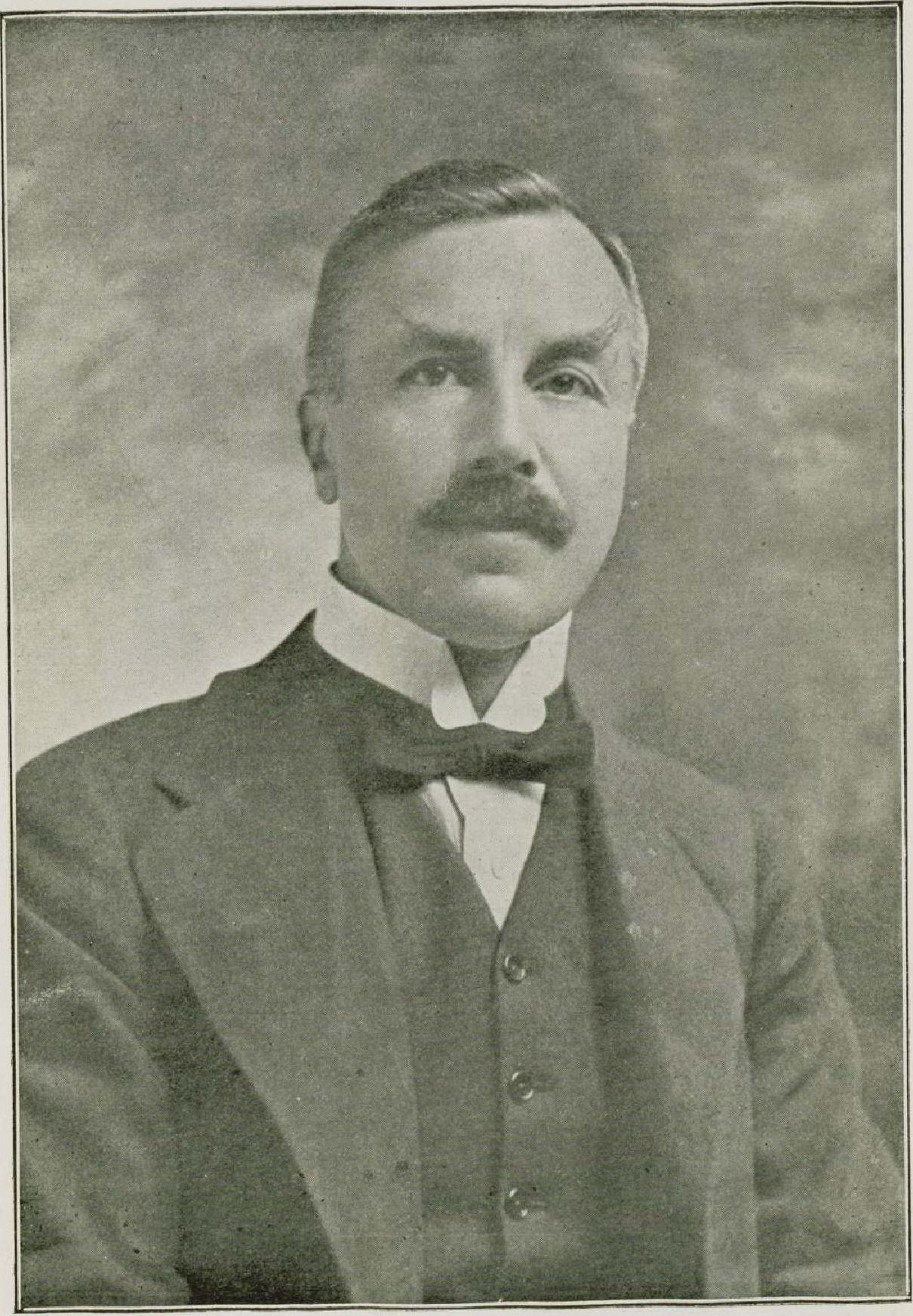
R. A. Streatfeild

Richard Alexander Streatfeild (22 June 1866 – 6 February 1919) was an English musicologist and critic. His career was spent at the British Museum, although not in its music department. His publications included books on opera, Handel and modern music. He had literary interests and arranged for posthumous publication of his friend Samuel Butler's The Way of All Flesh.

== Life and career ==
Streatfeild was born in Carshalton, Surrey, the son of Frank Newton Streatfeild, a diplomat in Southern Africa. He was educated at Oundle and Pembroke College, Cambridge, where he graduated in Classics. From 1889 until his death he served in the Department of Printed Books at the British Museum. From 1898 to 1902 he was also music critic of The Daily Graphic. He was a frequent contributor to English and foreign journals.

Although Streatfeild never worked in the musical department of the British Museum, music was his principal interest. He was an enthusiast for the modern music of his day, and also for the music of Handel. His first book, Masters of Italian Music (1895), was a study of Verdi, Boito and later composers including Puccini. In the Grove Dictionary of Music and Musicians (2014), Alec Hyatt-King commented, "Streatfeild’s book on Handel, though old-fashioned in some respects, is a balanced and penetrating study which is still valuable." Streatfeild's 1897 book Opera was reissued several times during his lifetime and afterwards, with revisions by J A Fuller Maitland and Edward J Dent. The 1907 edition was published online by Project Gutenberg in 2005.

Streatfeild also had literary interests, and was the literary executor of Samuel Butler. Under Streatfeild's supervision Butler's novel The Way of All Flesh was published in altered form in 1903, the year after the death of its author.

Streatfeild died in London at the age of 52.

== Books by Streatfeild ==
- Masters of Italian Music. London: Osgood McIlvain. 1895. OCLC 2578278.
- The Case of the Handel Festival. London: Woodfall and Kinder. 1897. OCLC 503774215.
- The Opera – A Sketch of the Development of Opera, with full descriptions of every work in the modern repertory. London and Philadelphia: J C Nimmo and Lippincott. 1897. OCLC 1194506.
- Modern Music and Musicians. London. 1906.
- Handel. London: New Library of Music. 1909. OCLC 220903317.
- Life stories of great composers; a collection of biographies of the greatest masters of music. Philadelphia: Theo. Presser Co. 1910. OCLC 965319769.
- Handel Autographs at the British Museum – Reprinted from The Times with Additions and Alterations. London: privately published. 1912. OCLC 314562222.
- Musiciens anglais contemporains. Paris: Éditions du Temps présent. 1913. OCLC 12659624.
- Handel, Canons and the Duke of Chandos. London: Chiswick Press. 1916. OCLC 11555457.
