= Philip Streatfeild =

English painter

James Philip Sydney Streatfeild (5 November 1879 – 3 June 1915) was an English painter and bohemian descended from the historic Streatfeild family of Chiddingstone Castle, Kent.

Streatfeild was born in Clapham, where his father was a bank clerk. His grandfather was the vicar of East Ham, Essex. He studied at art college. A successful artist, he had a studio off the Kings Road in London. It has been suggested he received training under Henry Scott Tuke. He painted portraits of industrialists, the occasional actress and young children. He was acquainted with London society and was a friend of Robbie Ross, patron of the arts and a former lover of Oscar Wilde.

In 1914, Streatfeild became a mentor to the then-14-year-old actor and later famed author Noël Coward. Coward's social ascendancy began thanks to Streatfeild who, before his death, asked wealthy socialite Mrs Astley Cooper to take Coward under her wing. Mrs Astley Cooper continued to encourage her late friend's protégé, who remained a frequent guest at her estate, Hambleton Hall in Rutland.

Streatfeild enlisted in the army in November 1914 but contracted tuberculosis and was invalided out in the spring of 1915. He died from the disease in June 1915 at age 35.

== See also ==
- Uranian
