= Alexander Streatfeild-Moore =

English cricketer

Alexander McNeill Streatfeild-Moore (born Alexander McNeill Streatfeild; 17 October 1863 – 30 December 1940) was an English amateur cricketer and member of the Streatfeild family.

Streatfeild-Moore was born at Westerham in Kent in 1863, the eldest son of Alexander Edward Streatfeild and Helen McNeill. He was educated at Charterhouse School and the Royal Military College, Sandhurst, both of which he played cricket for. He served as an officer of the Queen's Own Royal West Kent Regiment until resigning his commission in April 1885. He made seven first-class cricket appearances for Kent County Cricket Club between 1885 and 1888 and one appearance for Buckinghamshire County Cricket Club in the 1897 Minor Counties Championship.

Streatfeild-Moore died at Newbury, Berkshire in December 1940 aged 77. His brother Edward Champion Streatfeild (1870–1932) played for Surrey between 1890 and 1892. He was the first cousin of William Champion Streatfeild, bishop of Lewes and his grandmother, Hannah Fry, was the daughter of the prison reformer, Elizabeth Fry. He married his first cousin Evelyn Agatha Gatyana Streatfeild (1884–1975) and had two sons Frank Alexander (b 1918) and Thomas Edward (1921–1945).

== Bibliography ==
- Carlaw, Derek (2020). Kent County Cricketers, A to Z: Part One (1806–1914) (PDF). Cardiff: ACS.
