= Henry Streatfeild (landowner) =

- Portrait of Henry Streatfield by Arthur Devis - 1756
- Born: 3 June 1706; Chiddingstone, Kent, England
- Died: 4 April 1762 (aged 55); Chiddingstone, Kent, England
- Spouse: Lady Anne Sidney (m. 1752)
- Children: 5
- Parents: Henry Streatfeild (father); Elizabeth Beard (mother)

Henry Streatfeild (1706 – 1762) was a substantial British landowner and member of the prominent gentry family, the Streatfields of Chiddingstone, Kent.

Henry Streatfeild was born on 3 June 1706 in Chiddingstone. He was the son of Henry Streatfeild (1679-1747) and Elizabeth Beard. By tradition, the first son in each generation was called Henry which can sometimes cause challenges for local historians. He was admitted to the Middle Temple on 29 October 1723.

The Streatfeild family owned numerous estates in Kent, including Tyhurst and Chiddingstone Cobham. Henry Streatfeild bought Bore Place in 1759. Upon acquiring Bore Place, Henry chose to lease the attached lands to tenant farmers and Bore Place estate was divided in two, with one tenant farmer occupying the main house (South Bore Place) and another living in North Bore Place. Henry himself chose to live at High Street House in Chiddingstone, later known as Chiddingstone Castle, which he had inherited from his father in 1747.

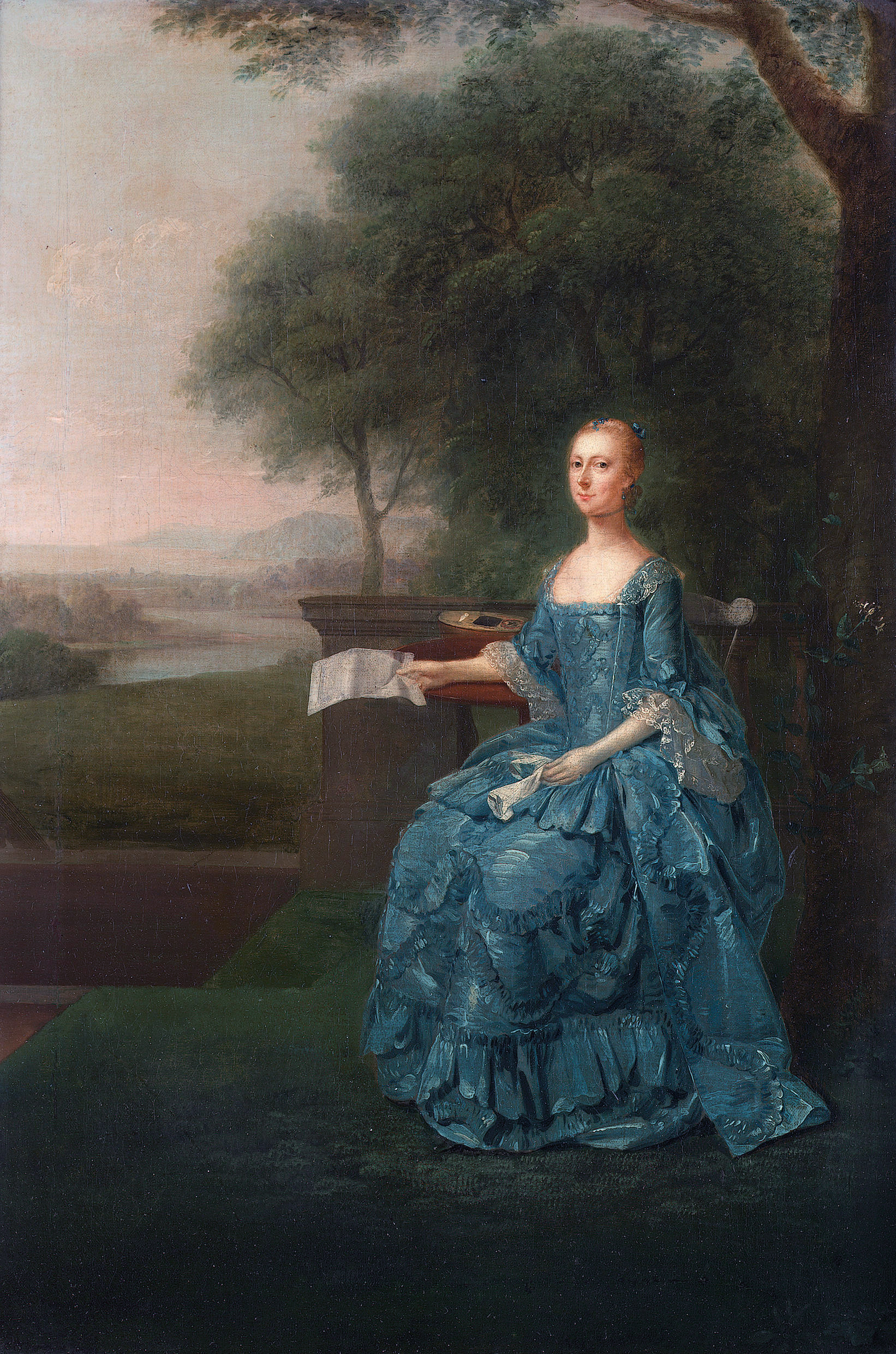
Anne Streatfeild, née Sidney (Arthur Devis)

Henry married Lady Anne Sidney, the illegitimate daughter of Jocelyn Sidney of Penshurst Place on 25 September 1752. at Enfield. On Sir Jocelyn's death, Henry could potentially have inherited the Penshurst Estate as the 7th Earl left no legitimate heir and on his death-bed wrote a will leaving everything to his 14-year-old illegitimate daughter, Anne. This however was successfully contested by her cousins, and after much legal wrangling Henry and Anne only received the income from the Sidneys' Welsh properties - but these were still fairly significant. Anne brought with her a marriage portion of £10,000 and estates in Glamorganshire.

Henry and Anne had five children, though the first died as an infant:

- Henry Streatfeild b. 1753, d. 1753
- Sophia Streatfeild b. 1755, d. 30 Nov 1835
- Harriet Streatfeild b. 1756, d. 1824
- Henry Streatfeild b. 13 May 1757, d. 22 Aug 1829
- Richard Thomas Streatfeild b. 23 Dec 1759, d. 26 Aug 1813

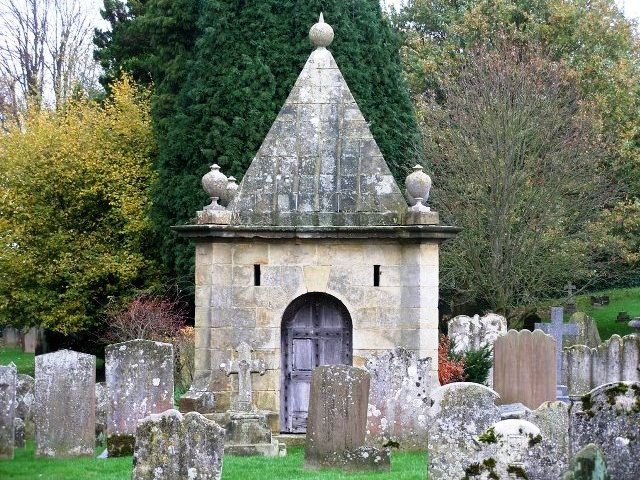
The Streatfeild Family Vault

Henry died on 4 April 1762 and was interred in the family vault at St Mary's Church Chiddingstone.
