= Chiddingstone =

Tudor village in Kent, England

Coordinates: 51.186090°N 0.148450°E

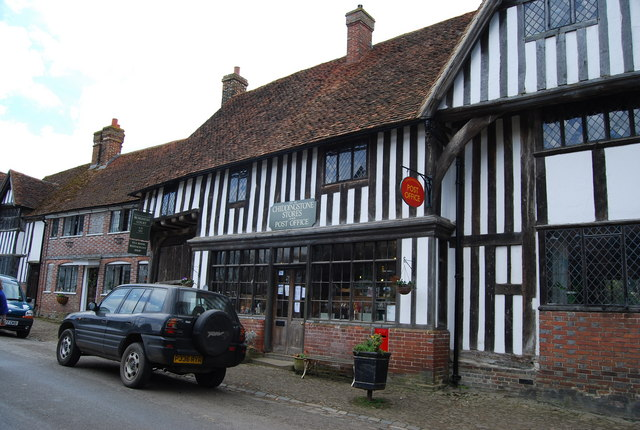
- Chiddingstone Post Office

- Location within Kent
- Population: 1,250 (2011 Census)
- OS grid reference: TQ495455
- District: Sevenoaks
- Shire county: Kent
- Region: South East
- Country: England
- Sovereign state: United Kingdom
- Post town: Edenbridge
- Postcode district: TN8
- Police: Kent
- Fire: Kent
- Ambulance: South East Coast
- UK Parliament: Tonbridge

Chiddingstone is a village and civil parish in the Sevenoaks District of Kent, England. The parish is located on the River Eden between Tonbridge and Edenbridge. The villages of Chiddingstone Causeway and Bough Beech and the hamlet Chiddingstone Hoath are also included in the parish.

Chiddingstone is unique in that, apart from the church and Chiddingstone Castle, the entire village is owned by the National Trust, which describes it as "the best example of a Tudor village left in the country". It is an example of a Tudor one-street village.

== History ==
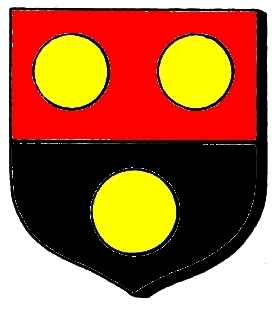
Arms of the Streatfields of Chiddingstone

Chiddingstone is mentioned in the Domesday Book. It was given to Bishop Odo in 1072 after the Norman invasion as part of his Earldom of Kent.

The first house was owned by Roger Attwood, constructed in the typical Kent style. Several villagers including Atwood took part in Jack Cade's rebellion of 1450, and were later pardoned.

The Castle Inn is a 15th-century building, which became a hostelry in 1730. It was visited by artists John Millais and Charles Rennie Mackintosh. Arthur Rackham also visited Chiddingstone.

The Streatfeild family were major landowners in the area, starting in 1584, the Streatfields grew their holdings in Chiddingstone until they owned much of land in and around the village. Their seat was at Chiddingstone Castle which was in their possession from the 16th century until the family sold the castle to Lord Astor in 1938, though they had vacated the castle by 1900. In the early 1800s Henry Streatfeild (son of Henry Streatfeild) changed the village significantly, diverting the road to prevent access on to his estate, demolishing some buildings and in their place redeveloped the land into the formal gardens and ponds that remain today as well as remodeling the family owned red brick manor house (High Street House) into Chiddingstone Castle.

The National Trust bought the village in 1939.

=== Parish church ===
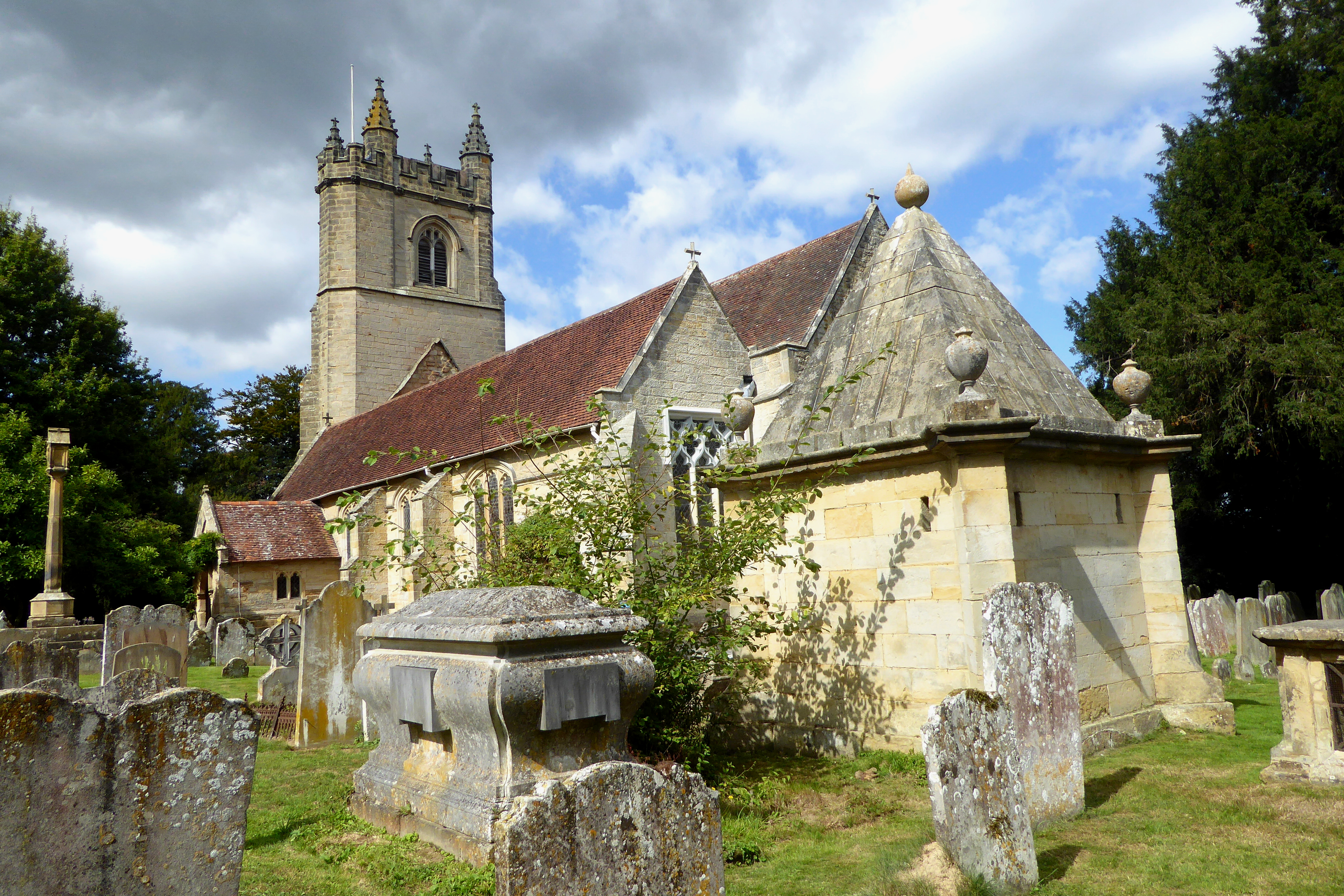
The medieval Church of St. Mary.

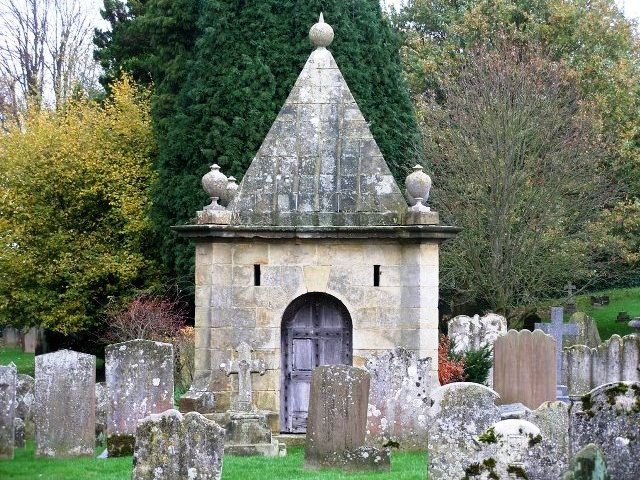
The Streatfeild Family Vault

St. Mary the Virgin, Chiddingstone is a large parish church which enhances the look of the village, and is perhaps the fourth built on that site. In the churchyard is a stone gazebo dating from 1736 built by Henry Streatfeild; leading down into the Streatfeild family vault beneath which has a through flow of air provided by vents in two false altar tombs, one adjacent to the gazebo and the other some 30 feet north.

The church was almost destroyed by a lightning fire in 1624. In recent years it has had new heating, lighting and sound systems installed. In addition to this, a chapel, at the base of the tower, has been constructed in 1979 with adjoining lavatory added in 2007.

=== Origin of name ===
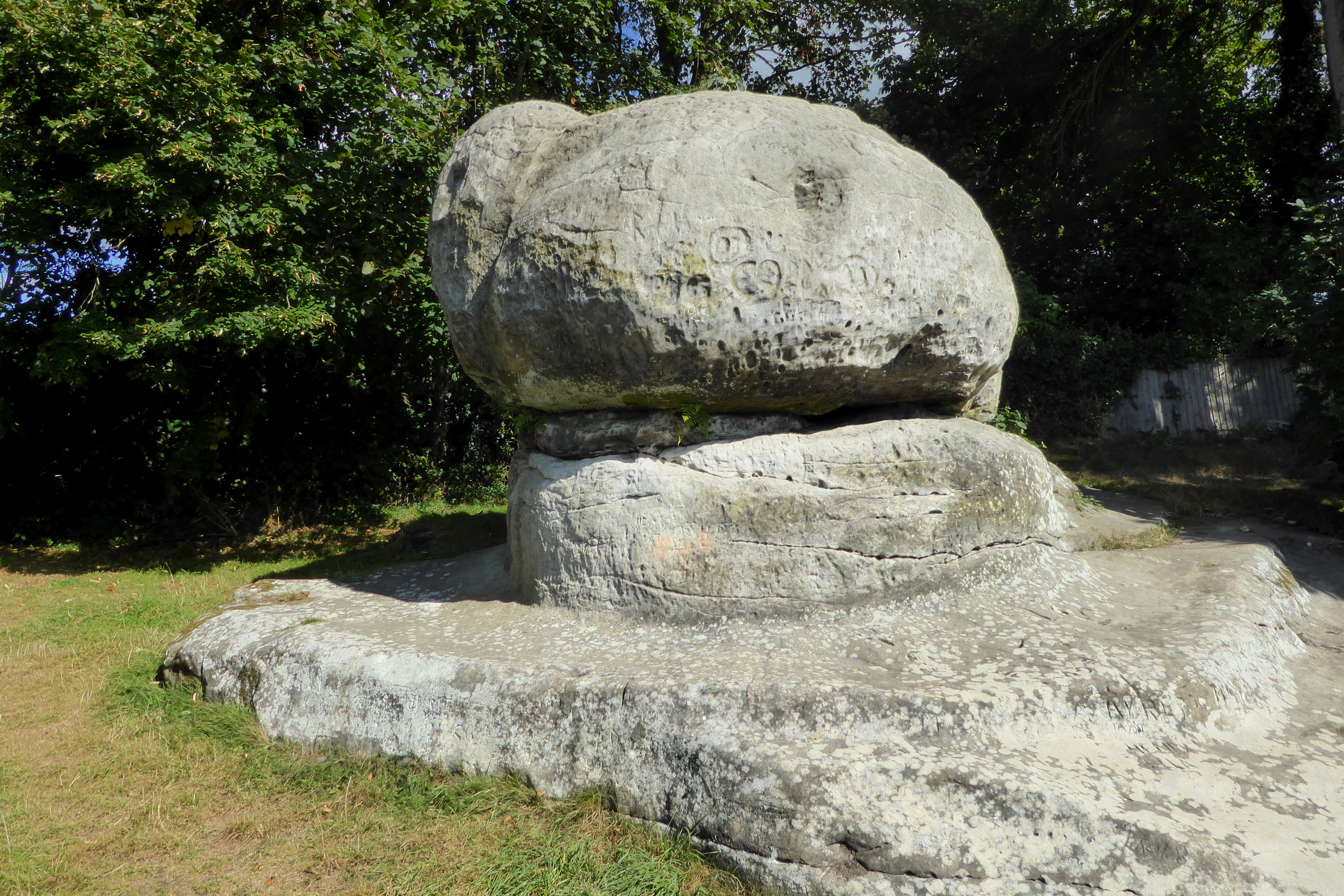
The natural sandstone Chiding Stone

A popular theory is that the village takes its name from a large sandstone rock formation, situated on its outskirts, named the Chiding Stone. Chidingstone was a previous spelling used for the village. The National Trust consider it more likely the name is derived from the homestead of Cidda's family, "Chidding tun". It was recorded as "Cidingstane" in the 12th century. The stone may have been used as a place to remonstrate overbearing local wives, a Druidical ritual site, or an Anglo-Saxon boundary marker.

== The village today ==
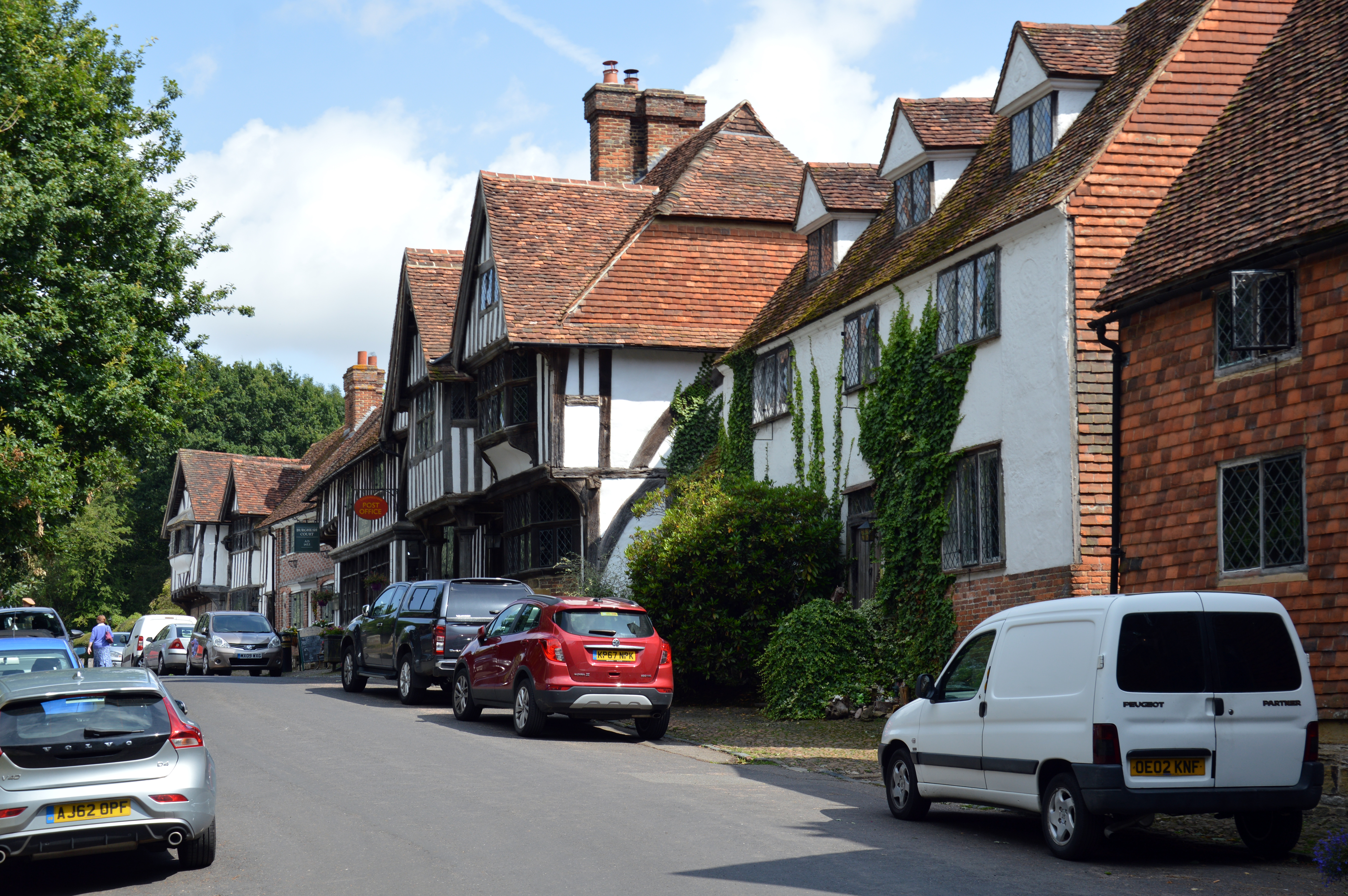
Main street

The nearest train station, Penshurst railway station, is located in the village of Chiddingstone Causeway. It is on the line between Tonbridge and Redhill.

There is a primary school, Chiddingstone Church of England School.

There are several nature reserves in the area including:

- Sevenoaks Reserve and Jeffery Harrison Visitor Centre (Operated by Kent Wildlife Trust)
- Visitors Centre and Reserve (Operated by Kent Wildlife Trust)
- Chiddingstone Reserve (Operated by Kent Wildlife Trust)

There is a village shop and accompanying cafe called The Tulip Tree, popular with cyclists at the weekend.

=== Film location ===
The village was used as a setting in the 1985 Merchant Ivory film A Room with a View, in the scene where Lucy and Cecil take a walk after their engagement party. The High Street is seen from the end nearest to the Castle Inn.

Michael Winner used Chiddingstone in his production of The Wicked Lady. Terry Jones and the Monty Python team filmed here for Wind in the Willows - Mr Toad's Wild Ride. Elizabeth R, starring Glenda Jackson was largely made here, as was Gerald Scarfe's Life of Hogarth.

== Notable people ==
- Edmund Meade-Waldo (1855–1934), ornithologist and conservationist, died in Chiddingstone.
