= Restoration style =

Decorative and literary arts style in England, mid-1600s

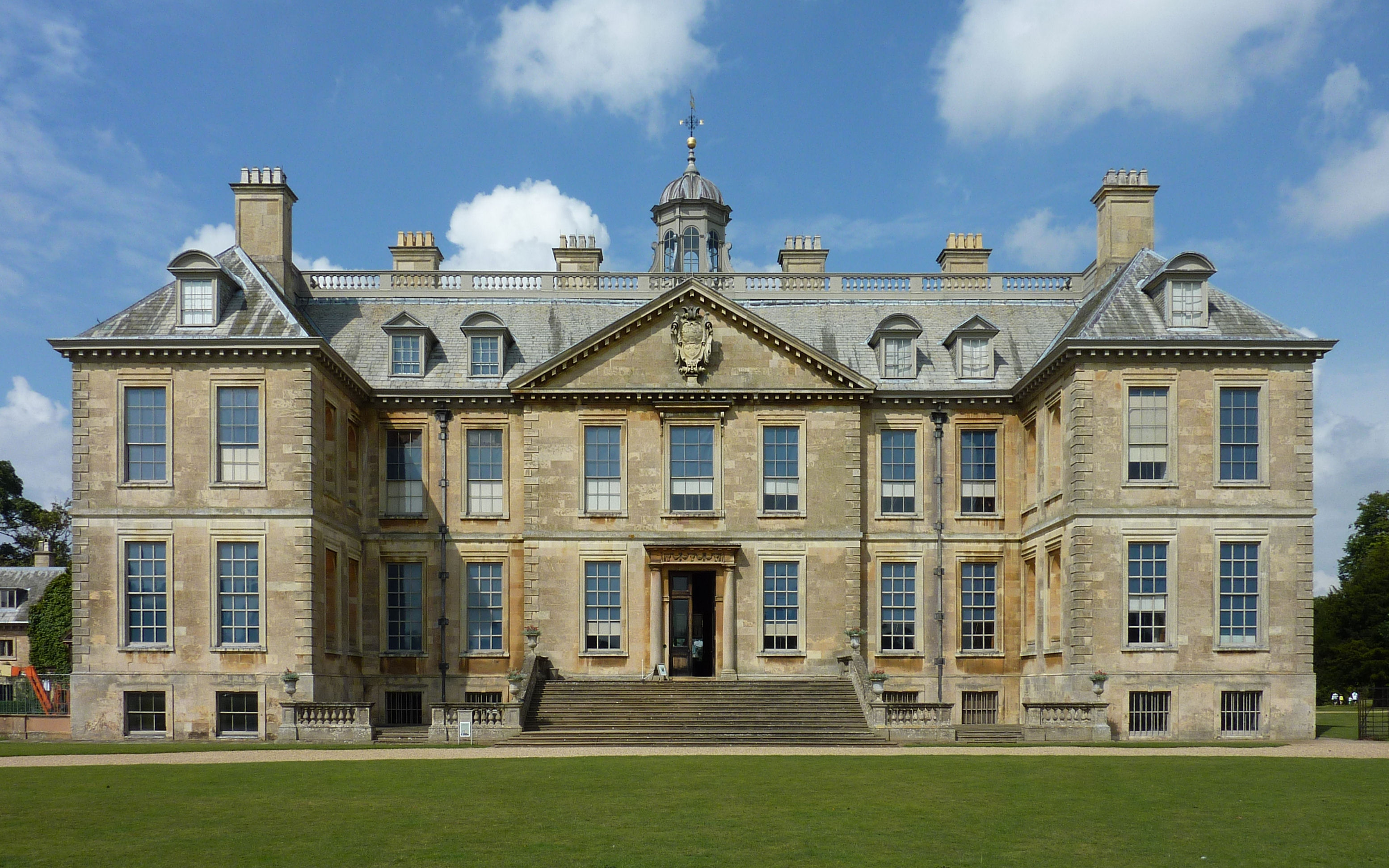
South (front) façade of Belton House

Restoration style, also known as Carolean style from the name Carolus (Latin for 'Charles'), refers to the decorative and literary arts that became popular in England from the restoration of the monarchy in 1660 under Charles II (reigned from 1660 to 1685) until the late 1680s. Similar shifts appeared in prose style.

The return of the King and his court from exile on the Continent led to the replacement of the Puritan severity of the Cromwellian style with a taste for magnificence and opulence, and to the introduction of Dutch and French artistic influences. These are evident in furniture in the use of floral marquetry, walnut instead of oak, twisted turned supports and legs, exotic veneers, cane seats and backs on chairs, sumptuous tapestry and velvet upholstery, and ornate carved and gilded scrolling bases for cabinets.

Restoration silver is characterized by embossed motifs for tulips and naturalistic fruit and leaves. New types of furniture introduced in this period include cabinets on stands, chests of drawers, armchairs and wing chairs, and daybeds.

The growing power of the English East India Company resulted in increased imports of exotic commodities from China and Japan, including tea, porcelain and lacquer, and chintzes from India. This led to a craze for chinoiserie, reflected in the development of imitation lacquer (Japanning), blue and white decoration on ceramics, flat-chased scenes of Chinese-style figures and landscapes on silver, and new forms of silver such as teapots, as well as colourful Indian-style crewelwork bed-hangings and curtains.

Other developments in the Restoration period were the emergence of the English glass industry, following the invention of lead glass by George Ravenscroft around 1676, and the manufacture of slipware by Thomas Toft.

After the accession of William III and Mary II in 1689, Restoration style was superseded by William and Mary style.

== See also ==
- English Restoration
- Restoration comedy
