= William Streatfeild =

William Champion Streatfeild

William Champion Streatfeild (1 September 1865 – 15 February 1929) was the Anglican Bishop of Lewes. He was a descendant of the historic Streatfeild family, the father of the novelist Noel Streatfeild, and appears as the beloved but over-saintly father of the heroine, Victoria, in her autobiographical novel A Vicarage Family.

== Biography ==
William was the eldest son of the Rev. William Champion Streatfeild (1839–1912) and Selina Frances Diana Leveson-Gower (1840–1916), and was educated at Marlborough and Pembroke College, Cambridge before being ordained in 1890. His ministry began with a curacy at Sittingbourne under his father-in-law, Henry Venn, after which he was Curate to his own father in Frant, Sussex. He then began a long period as Incumbent at several Sussex parishes: Amberley (with Houghton), St Leonards-on-Sea from 1902, and Eastbourne (where he was also Rural Dean). He was elevated to the episcopate in December 1928 but only served as bishop for two months until his death.

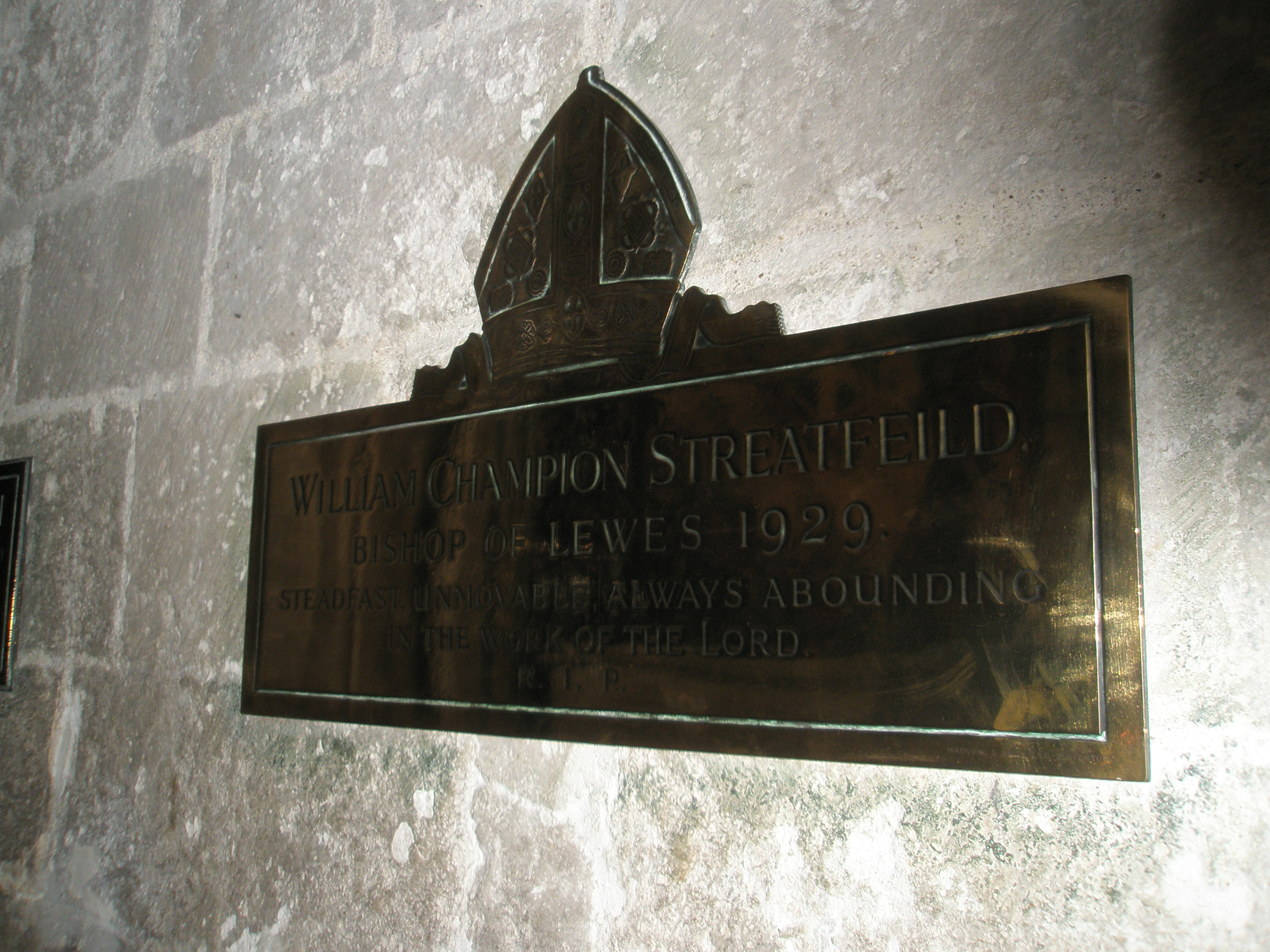
Memorial within Chichester Cathedral

A small brass memorial to him lies in the north aisle of Chichester Cathedral.

== Family ==
William's father, the Rev. William Champion Streatfeild, was the sometime Vicar of Howick, Ryton-on-Tyne, Kings Worthy and Frant.

William married Janet Venn (1873–1952), daughter of Henry Venn, under whom William was curate in Sittingbourne, on 7 September 1893. Janet was from a strong evangelical family. Her great grandfather John Venn was one of the founders and her grandfather (Henry Venn) honorary secretary of the Church Missionary Society (CMS). Her uncle, John Venn was the mathematician famous for Venn diagrams.

Two of William's brothers, Rev Claude Streatfeild (1870–1951) and Rev Roland Harry Streatfeild (1871–1952) were also Church of England clergymen. Roland was curate to William in Eastbourne.

One of William's daughters was the children's novelist Noel Streatfeild (1895–1986) and another the artist Ruth Gervis (1894–1988).

William died on 15 February 1929 aged 63 while travelling on the 9.29 train from Lewes to Eastbourne for a dental appointment, three days after his diocesan bishop Winfrid Oldfield Burrows.

== Ancestry and descendants ==
Ancestors of William Streatfeild

16. Sandeforth Streatfeild
8. Rev Thomas Streatfeild
17. Frances Hussey
4. William Champion Streatfeild
18. Alexander Champion
9. Harriet Champion
19. Ann Platt
2. Rev William Champion Streatfeild
20. William Storrs Fry
10. Joseph Fry
21. Elizabeth Lambert
5. Hannah Fry
22. John Gurney
11. Elizabeth Gurney
23. Catherine Bell
1. Rt Rev William Champion Streatfeild
24. Rear-Admiral John Leveson-Gower
12. William Leveson-Gower
25. Frances Boscawen
6. William Leveson-Gower
26. John Gresham
13. Katherine Maria Gresham
27. Henrietta Maria Clayton
3. Selina Leveson-Gower
28. Welbore Ellis Doyle
14. Francis Hastings Doyle
29. Frances Rainford
7. Emily Josephine Eliza Doyle
30. William Mordaunt Milner, 3rd Bt
15. Diana Elizabeth Milner
31. Diana Sturt

== Notes ==
Church of England titles
Preceded by Thomas William Cook	Bishop of Lewes; 1928–1929	Succeeded by Hugh Maudslay Hordern
