= Thomas Streatfeild =

English antiquarian

Rev Thomas Streatfeild MA, FSA (5 January 1777 – 17 May 1848) was an antiquarian and churchman in the early 19th century descended from the historic Streatfeild family. He lived on both sides of the Surrey Kent border, but is best known for his extensive research on the history of Kent.

Whilst at Tatsfield in Surrey he bought land in the adjoining parish of Westerham, Kent and built a house there – Chart's Edge – to his own design in 1822.

Thomas Streatfeild memorial plaque, Chiddingstone Church

== Antiquarian ==
Thomas Streatfeild matriculated at Oriel College, Oxford on 19 May 1795 and graduated with a B.A. in 1799.

He devoted much time to a history of Kent but only one volume was ever published (Hundred of Blackheath) – some 50 volumes of his unpublished material are lodged in the British Museum.

He was also a skilled artist and he completed a number of wood engravings and drawings for the History.

== Churchman ==
As well as being an historian and writer, Thomas Streatfeild was an Anglican clergyman. He was first Curate at St Mary’s, Long Ditton, Surrey, and at that time chaplain to the Duke of Kent and later Curate of St Mary the Virgin, Tatsfield, Surrey.

He altered and repaired the little church at Tatsfield by subscription in 1838, including the tower and porch at his own expense. The following inscription can be found in the porch “Be it remembered that the masonry of this porch and tower is the free gift of the Rev. T. Streatfeild, of Chart’s Edge, Curate, 1838. Thomas Barrett, Timothy Ringoss, churchwardens.”

== Family ==
Thomas Streatfeild was the son of Sandeforth Streatfeild (1750 – 28 July 1809) and Frances Hussey (1750-1821).

He married Harriet Champion (1776-1814), daughter of Alexander Champion, a wealthy merchant and whaler of Wandsworth, London, on 8 Oct 1800, and through her he acquired a considerable fortune. In 1823 he married again, Clare, the daughter of Rev Thomas Harvey and the widow of Henry Woodgate. He had 14 children, 9 with Harriet and 5 with Clare.

== Ancestry ==
Ancestors of Thomas Streatfeild

16. William Streatfeild
8. Robert Streatfeild
17. Anne Martin
4. Robert Streatfeild
18. Robert Streatfeild
9. Barbara Streatfeild
19. Barbara Streatfeild
2. Sandeforth Streatfeild
20. Rev Miles Sandeforth
10. Samuel Sandeforth
5. Anne Sandeforth
22. Melancthon Strong
11. Elizabeth Strong
23. Thomasine Ballifant
1. Rev Thomas Streatfeild
24. Edward Hussey
12. Thomas Hussey
25. Elinor Cresset
6. Thomas Hussey
26. Thomas Lake
13. Frances Lake
27. Alice Kirill
3. Frances Hussey
28. Maurice Berkeley
14. Maurice Berkeley
7. Anne Berkeley
30. Rev Roger Callow
15. Anne Callow
31. Susan Jenkin
