= List of children's literature writers =

These writers are notable authors of children's literature with some of their most famous works.

== A ==
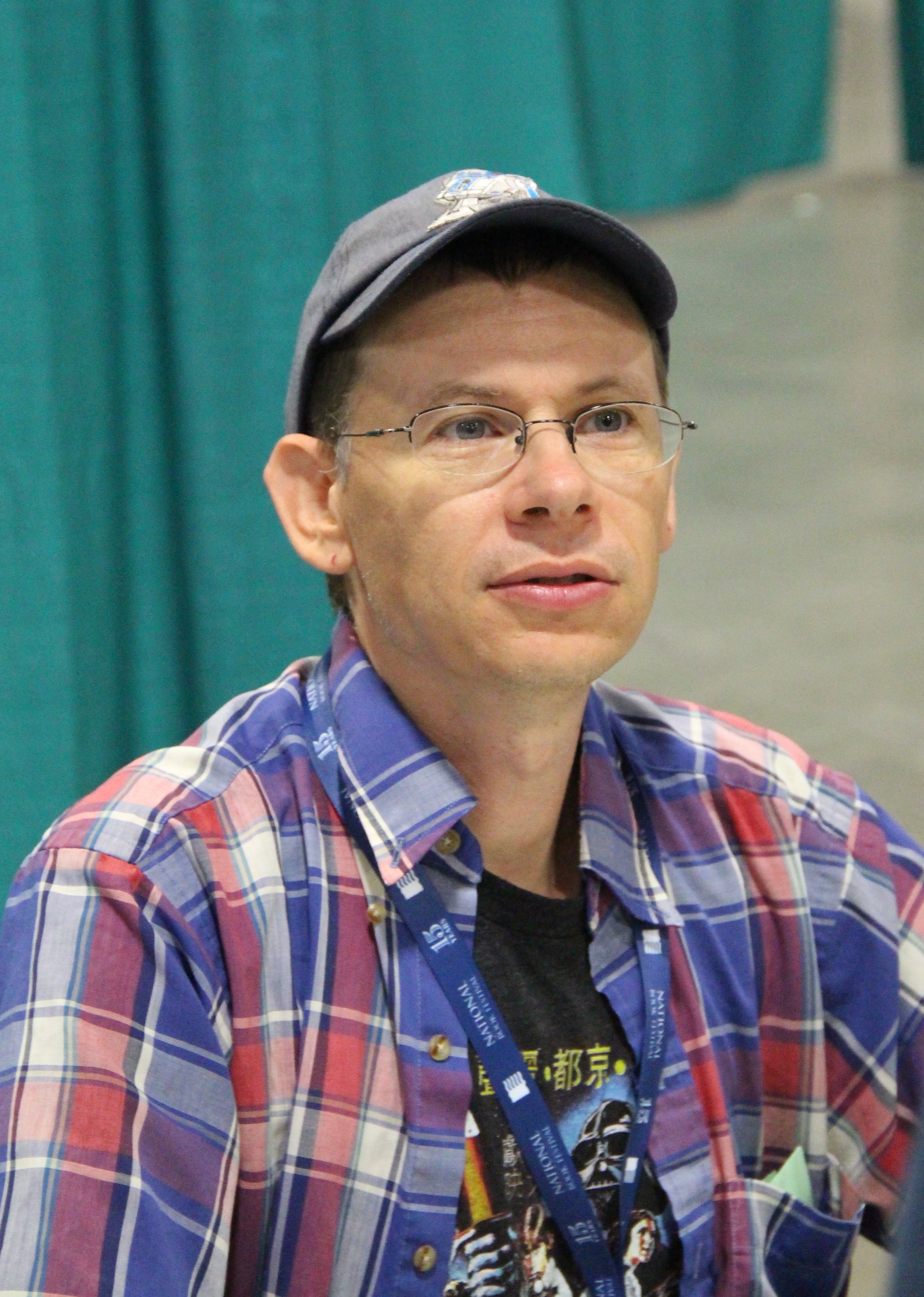
Tom Angleberger

- Verna Aardema (1911–2001) – Why Mosquitoes Buzz in People's Ears
- Rafael Ábalos (born 1956) – Grimpow
- Jacob Abbott (1803–1879) – Rollo series, Cousin Lucy's Conversations, Bruno
- Tony Abbott (born 1952) – The Secrets of Droon, Danger Guys
- Deborah Abela (born 1966) – Max Remy Superspy, Grimsdon
- Joan Abelove (born 1945) – Go and Come Back
- Chris van Abkoude (1880–1960) – Pietje Bell series, Little Crumb
- Socorro Acioli (born 1975) – The Ghost Dancer
- Richard Adams (1920–2016) – Watership Down
- Jean Adamson (1928–2024) – Topsy and Tim
- C. S. Adler (born 1932) – Magic of the Glits, Ghost Brother
- David A. Adler (born 1947) – Cam Jansen series, The Babe and I
- Aesop (6th century BCE) – Fables
- Edith J. Agnew (1897–1988) – Nezbah's Lamb
- Joan Aiken (1924–2004) – The Wolves of Willoughby Chase, Arabel and Mortimer series, A Necklace of Raindrops
- Ahmad Akbarpour (born 1970) – If I Were a Pilot
- Uxue Alberdi (born 1984) – Besarkada
- Vivien Alcock (1924–2003) – The Haunting of Cassie Palmer
- Louisa May Alcott (1832–1888) – Little Women, The Brownie and the Princess
- Kwame Alexander (born 1968) – The Crossover
- Lloyd Alexander (1924–2007) – The Chronicles of Prydain, Westmark trilogy
- Sue Alexander (1933–2008) – Nadia the Willful
- Horatio Alger, Jr. (1832–1899) – Ragged Dick
- Mabel Esther Allan (1915–1998) – Over the Sea to School, Ballet for Drina, The Ballet Family
- David Almond (born 1951) – Skellig, Heaven Eyes, Kit's Wilderness
- Joseph Alexander Altsheler (1862–1919) – The Young Trailers series, The Civil War series
- Adi Alsaid (born 1986) – Let's Get Lost, The Bravest Warrior in Nefaria, The Greatest Heist in Joviala
- Julia Alvarez (born 1950) – Tia Lola series
- Hans Christian Andersen (1805–1875) – "The Snow Queen", "The Little Mermaid", "The Ugly Duckling", "The Emperor's New Clothes", "The Princess and the Pea", "Thumbelina"
- Lena Anderson (born 1939) – Tea for Ten, Tick-Tock
- Verily Anderson (1915–2010) – Brownies series
- Sophia de Mello Breyner Andresen (1919–2004) – A Menina do Mar, O Cavaleiro da Dinamarca, A Floresta, A Fada Oriana
- Tom Angleberger – The Strange Case of Origami Yoda
- Sam Angus (born 1967) – Soldier Dog, The House on Hummingbird Island
- Charlotte Anley (1796–1893) – Influence: A Moral Tale for Young People (1822)
- K. A. Applegate (born 1956) – Animorphs, Remnants, Everworld series, The One and Only Ivan
- Victor Appleton (Stratemeyer house pseudonym from 1910) – Tom Swift series
- Malayath Appunni (born 1943) – Kambili Kuppayam
- Philip Ardagh (born 1961) – Eddie Dickens series, Unlikely Exploits series
- Edward Ardizzone (1900–1979) – Tim All Alone, Tim and the Brave Sea Captain (self-illustrated)
- Laura Adams Armer (1874–1963) – Waterless Mountain
- William H. Armstrong (1914–1999) – Sounder
- Elizabeth Arnold (born 1944) – The Parsley Parcel
- Tedd Arnold (born 1949) – No Jumping on the Bed!, Parts
- Ruth M. Arthur (1905–1979) – A Candle in Her Room, Portrait of Margarita, Requiem for a Princess
- Frank Asch (1946–2022) – I Can Blink
- Bernard Ashley (born 1935) – The Trouble with Donovan Croft, Dodgem, Little Soldier
- Ros Asquith (living) – Teenage Worrier series
- M. E. Atkinson (1899–1974) – August Adventure, Smugglers' Gap, Mystery Manor
- Margaret Atwood (born 1939) – Up in the Tree, Princess Prunella and the Purple Peanut, Wandering Wenda and Widow Wallop's Wunderground Washery
- Cécile Aubry (1928–2010) – Belle et Sébastien
- Martin Auer (born 1951) – Now, Now, Markus, The Blue Boy
- Steve Augarde (born 1950) – The Various, Celandine
- Jonathan Auxier (born 1981) – The Night Gardener, Sweep: The Story of a Girl and Her Monster
- Esther Averill (1902–1992) – The Cat Club, The Fire Cat
- Gillian Avery (1926–2016) – The Warden's Niece, The Elephant War, A Likely Lad
- Harold Avery (1869–1943) – The Triple Alliance, Play the Game
- Avi (born 1937) – Crispin: The Cross of Lead, The True Confessions of Charlotte Doyle
- Christopher Awdry (born 1940) – The Railway Series #27–40 (Thomas the Tank Engine stories)
- Wilbert Awdry (1911–1997) – The Railway Series #1–26 (Thomas the Tank Engine stories)

== B ==
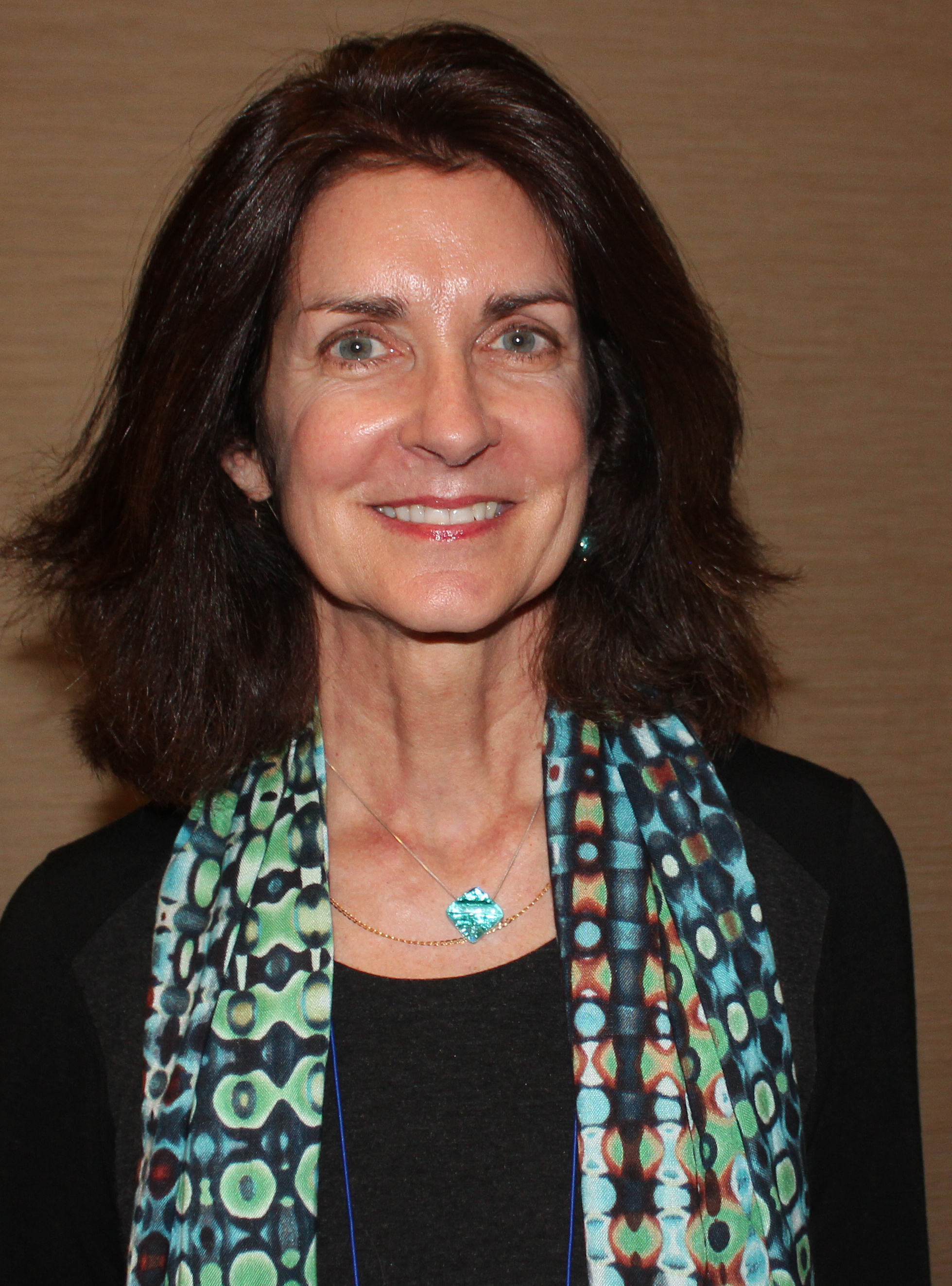
Blue Balliett

- Natalie Babbitt (1932–2016) – Tuck Everlasting, Knee-Knock Rise, The Search for Delicious
- Maria Baciu (born 1942) – Ghetuţele copilăriei
- Enid Bagnold (1889–1981) – National Velvet
- Bob Balaban (born 1945) – McGrowl series
- Katya Balen (born 1989) – October, October, The Light in Everything
- R. M. Ballantyne (1825–1894) – The Coral Island
- Blue Balliett (born 1955) – Chasing Vermeer, The Wright 3, The Calder Game
- Lynne Reid Banks (1929–2024) – The Indian in the Cupboard series
- Helen Bannerman (1862–1946) – Little Black Sambo
- Shirley Barber (1935–2023) – The Tale of Martha B. Rabbit, A Wedding in Fairyland
- Ralph Henry Barbour (1870–1944) – The Half Back, For the Honor of the School, Tom, Dick and Harriet
- Clive Barker (born 1952) – The Thief of Always
- Kathleen Frances Barker (1901–1963) – Just Dogs (1933)
- Joyce Barkhouse (1913–2012) – Pit Pony
- Jill Barklem (1951–2017) – Brambly Hedge
- Steve Barlow and Steve Skidmore – Outernet series
- Kitty Barne (1883–1961) – She Shall Have Music, Family Footlights, Visitors from London, Rosina Copper
- Derrick Barnes – Crown: An Ode to the Fresh Cut, Ruby and the Booker Boys series
- Kelly Barnhill (living) – The Girl Who Drank the Moon
- J. M. Barrie (1860–1937) – Peter Pan
- T. A. Barron (born 1952) – The Lost Years of Merlin
- Dave Barry (born 1947) – Peter and the Starcatchers series
- Margaret Stuart Barry (1927–2022) – Simon and the Witch
- Graeme Base (born 1958) – Animalia
- L. Frank Baum (1856–1919) – The Wonderful Wizard of Oz series
- Hans Baumann (1914–1988) – Sons of the Steppe, I Marched with Hannibal
- Nina Bawden (1925–2012) – Carrie's War, The Witch's Daughter, The Peppermint Pig
- "BB" (D. J. Watkins-Pitchford) (1905–1990) – The Little Grey Men, Down the Bright Stream, Bill Badger and the Pirates
- S.G. Hulme Beaman (1887–1932) – Toytown stories
- Jerome Beatty Jr (1916–2002) – Matthew Looney space series
- Aaron Becker (born 1974) – Journey, Quest, Return
- Thea Beckman (1923–2004) – Crusade in Jeans, Children of Mother Earth series
- Frank Beddor (born 1958) – The Looking Glass Wars series
- John Bellairs (1938–1991) – The House with a Clock in Its Walls
- Hilaire Belloc (1870–1953) – Cautionary Tales for Children, The Bad Child's Book of Beasts, More Beasts for Worse Children
- Ludwig Bemelmans (1898–1962) – Madeline
- Derek Benz (born 1971) – Grey Griffins
- Berechiah ha-Nakdan (12th – 13th century) – Mishle Shualim, Fables of a Jewish Aesop
- Stan and Jan Berenstain (1923–2005 and 1923–2012) – The Berenstain Bears series
- Elisabeth Beresford (1928–2010) – The Wombles, Awkward Magic
- Leila Berg (1917–2012) – Nippers series
- Paul Berna (1908–1994) – A Hundred Million Francs, The Street Musician, Flood Warning
- Elsa Beskow (1874–1953)
- Luc Besson (born 1958) – Arthur and the Minimoys series
- Amália Bezerédj (1804–1837) – Flóri könyve
- Vitaly Bianki (1894–1959) – Whose Nose Is Better?
- David Biedrzycki (born 1955) – Ace Lacewing: Bug Detective, Me and My Dragon, Santa Retires
- Paul Biegel (1925–2006) – The King of the Copper Mountains, The Little Captain, The Elephant Party
- Margaret Biggs (born 1929) – Melling School series
- Franny Billingsley (born 1954) – Well Wished, Big Bad Bunny
- Claire Huchet Bishop (1899–1993) – The Five Chinese Brothers, All Alone, The Big Loop
- Bryndís Björgvinsdóttir (born 1982) – Flugan sem stöðvaði stríðið, Hafnfirðingabrandarinn
- Christina Björk (born 1938) – Linnea in Monet's Garden
- Holly Black (born 1971) – The Spiderwick Chronicles, Beyond the Spiderwick Chronicles, Tithe, Valiant
- Mary Fleming Black (1848–1893) – Bright Jewels
- Malorie Blackman (born 1962) – Noughts & Crosses, Pig Heart Boy, Cloud Busting
- Clair Blank (1915–1965) – Beverly Gray mystery series
- Judy Blume (born 1938) – Are You There, God? It's Me, Margaret, Fudge series
- Enid Blyton (1897–1968) – Noddy series, The Famous Five series, The Secret Seven series, The Faraway Tree series, Sunny Stories magazine
- Godfried Bomans (1913–1971) – Eric in the Land of the Insects, The Wily Wizard and the Wicked Witch, Pim, Frits en Ida
- Michael Bond (1926–2017) – Paddington Bear series
- Nancy Bond (born 1945) – A String in the Harp
- Ruskin Bond (born 1934) – The Room on the Roof, The Blue Umbrella, Angry River
- Veronica Bonilla (born 1962) – The Platanario series, Magic Dream
- Arna Bontemps (1902–1970) – Sad-Faced Boy, Lonesome Boy, Mr. Kelso's Lion
- Lucy M. Boston (1892–1990) – Green Knowe series
- J. Allan Bosworth (1925–1990) – White Water, Still Water, All the Dark Places
- Marie Marguerite Bouvet (1865–1915) – Sweet William, Little Marjorie's Love Story, Prince Tip–Top
- Chris Bradford (born 1974) – Young Samurai series
- Kimberly Brubaker Bradley (born 1967) – The War That Saved My Life
- Tony Bradman (born 1954) – Dilly the Dinosaur series
- Gillian Bradshaw (born 1956) – The Dragon and the Thief, The Land of Gold, Beyond the North Wind

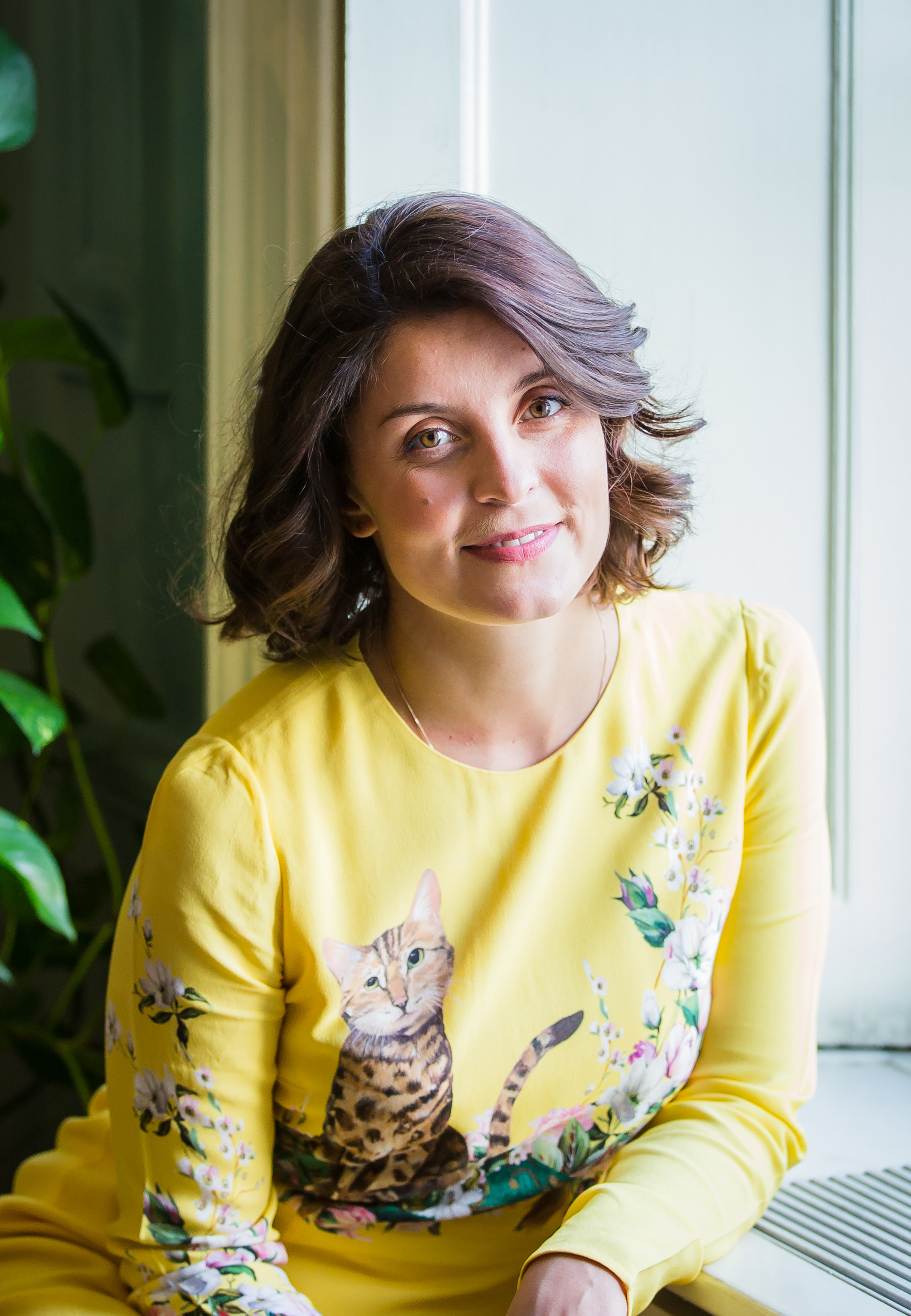
Jessie Burton

- Christianna Brand (1907–1988) – Nurse Matilda series (adapted as Nanny McPhee)
- Ann Brashares (born 1967) – The Sisterhood of the Traveling Pants series
- Angela Brazil (1868–1947) – The Nicest Girl in the School, For the Sake of the School, The Jolliest Term on Record
- Petronella Breinburg (1931–2019) – My Brother Sean, Sally-Ann's Umbrella
- Elinor Brent-Dyer (1894–1969) – Chalet School series
- Jan Brett (born 1949) – Trouble with Trolls, The Three Snow Bears
- Thomas Brezina (born 1963) – The Knickerbocker Gang, Tom Turbo
- Rae Bridgman – The MiddleGate Books: The Serpent's Spell, Amber Ambrosia, Fish & Sphinx
- Katharine Mary Briggs (1898–1980) – Hobberdy Dick, Kate Crackernuts
- Robert Bright (1902–1988) – Georgie
- Carol Ryrie Brink (1895–1981) – Caddie Woodlawn, Baby Island
- Hesba Fay Brinsmead (1922–2003) – Pastures of the Blue Crane, Longtime Dreaming
- Ivana Brlić-Mažuranić (1874–1938) – The Marvelous Adventures and Misadventures of Hlapić the Apprentice, Tales of Long Ago
- Frances Freeling Broderip (1830–1878) – Funny Fables for Little Folks
- Lauren Brooke – Heartland series, Chestnut Hill series
- Walter R. Brooks (1886–1958) – Freddy the Pig series
- Abbie Farwell Brown (1871–1927) – The Book of Saints and Friendly Beasts, The Lonesomest Doll
- Marc Brown (born 1946) – Arthur series
- Marcia Brown (1918–2015) – Puss in Boots
- Margaret Wise Brown (1910–1952) – Goodnight Moon, The Runaway Bunny
- Pamela Brown (1924–1989) – The Swish of the Curtain
- Frances Browne (1816–1879) – Granny's Wonderful Chair
- Mary Grant Bruce (1878–1958) – A Little Bush Maid
- Jean de Brunhoff (1899–1937) – Babar the Elephant series
- Ashley Bryan (1923–2022) – Freedom Over Me, Sing to the Sun
- Jan Brzechwa (1900–1966) – Pan Kleks series, and many poems for children
- John Buchan (1875–1940) – The Magic Walking Stick, The Long Traverse
- Susan Buchan (1882–1977) – Jim and the Dragon, Mice on Horseback, The Cat's Grandmother
- Anthony Buckeridge (1912–2004) – Jennings school stories
- Maria Elizabeth Budden (c. 1780–1832) – Always Happy!!: Or, Anecdotes of Felix and his Sister Serena. A Tale
- Kir Bulychev (1934–2003) – Alisa Selezneva series
- Elizabeth C. Bunce (living) – A Curse Dark as Gold, StarCrossed, Myrtle Hardcastle mystery series: Premeditated Myrtle, Cold-Blooded Myrtle
- Eve Bunting (1928–2023) – Smoky Night
- John Bunyan (1628–1688) – Pilgrim's Progress
- Robert J. Burch (1925–2007) – Queenie Peavy, Ida Early Comes Over the Mountain
- Della Burford (born 1946) – Journey to Dodoland, Magical Earth Secrets, Miracle Galaxy
- Anthony Burgess (1917–1993) – A Long Trip to Tea Time, The Land Where the Ice Cream Grows
- Gelett Burgess (1866–1951) – Goops series, and many poems for children including "Purple Cow"
- Thornton W. Burgess (1874–1965) – The Adventures of Danny Meadow Mouse, Old Mother West Wind
- Doris Burn (1923–2011) – Andrew Henry's Meadow, The Summerfolk
- Alice Hale Burnett (fl. early 20th c.) – The Merryvale Boys
- Frances Hodgson Burnett (1849–1924) – A Little Princess, Little Lord Fauntleroy, The Secret Garden
- Sheila Burnford (1918–1984) – The Incredible Journey
- Edgar Rice Burroughs (1875–1950) – Tarzan series
- Hester Burton (1913–2000) – Time of Trial
- Jessie Burton (born 1982) – The Restless Girls, Medusa
- Virginia Lee Burton (1909–1968) – The Little House, Mike Mulligan and His Steam Shovel
- A. J. Butcher – Spy High series
- Rumena Bužarovska (born 1981) – What the Ladybug Saw
- Betsy Byars (1928–2020) – Summer of the Swans, Tornado
- Georgia Byng (born 1965) – Molly Moon's Incredible Book of Hypnotism, Molly Moon Stops the World

== C ==
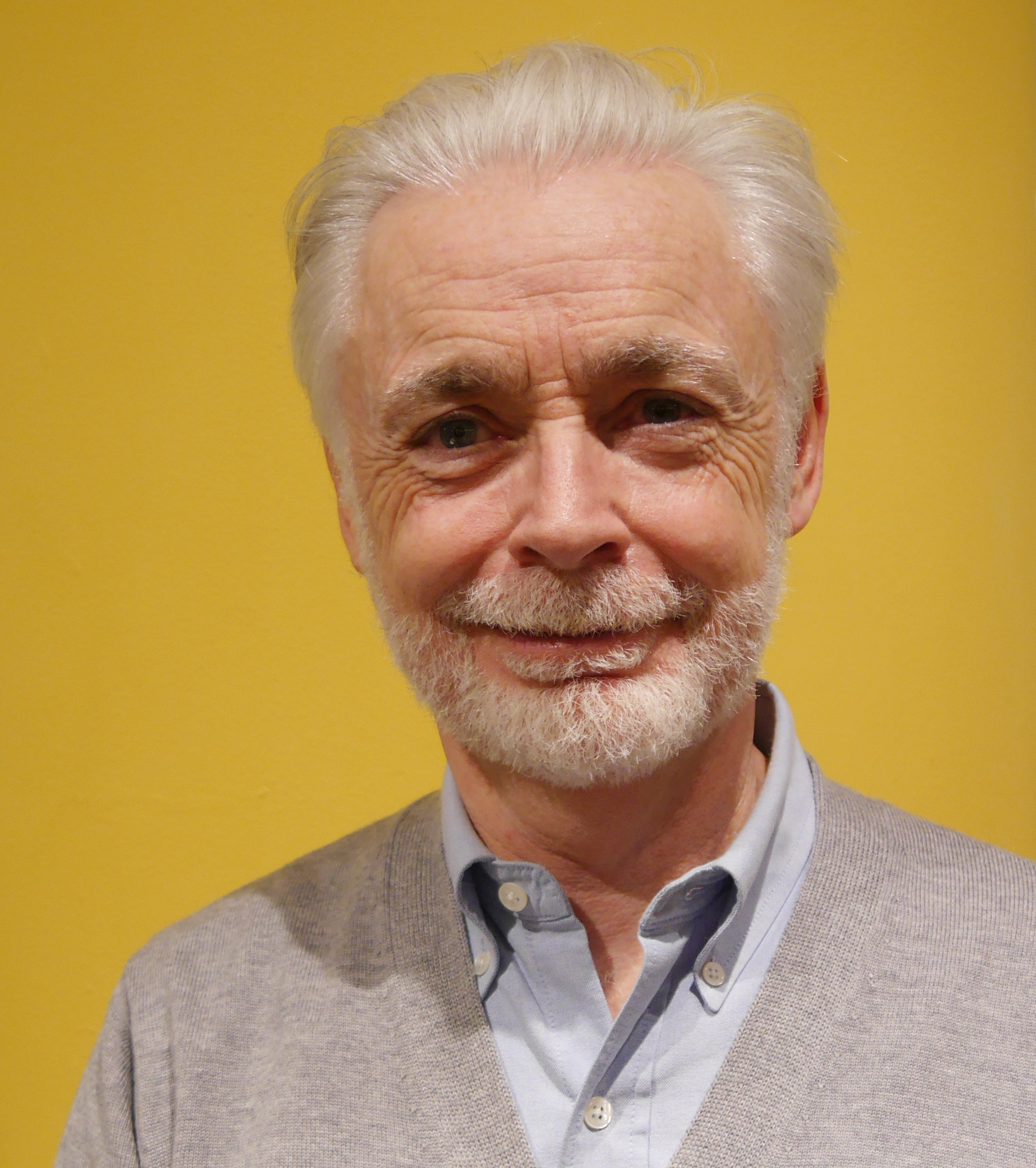
Eoin Colfer

- Meg Cabot (born 1967) – The Princess Diaries, Allie Finkle's Rules for Girls
- Eleanor Cameron (1912–1996) – The Wonderful Flight to the Mushroom Planet, The Court of the Stone Children
- Joanna Campbell (born 1946) – Thoroughbred series
- Cao Wenxuan (born 1954) – Bronze and Sunflower
- William Cardell (1780–1828) – The Story of Jack Halyard, the Sailor Boy
- Rosa Nouchette Carey (1840–1909) – Not Like Other Girls, Heriot's Choice
- Eric Carle (1929–2021) – The Very Hungry Caterpillar, The Very Busy Spider
- Natalie Savage Carlson (1906–1997) – The Happy Orpheline, The Family Under the Bridge, The Empty Schoolhouse
- Carrie Carlton (1834–1868) – Inglenook
- Isobelle Carmody (born 1958) – The Legend of Little Fur, Magic Night, Obernewtyn Chronicles
- Lewis Carroll (1832–1898) – Alice's Adventures in Wonderland, Through the Looking-Glass
- Anne Laurel Carter (born 1953) – The Shepherd's Granddaughter, Under a Prairie Sky
- Peter Carter (1929–1999) – The Sentinels, Children of the Book, Borderlands
- Soman Chainani (born 1979) – The School for Good and Evil
- Anna Maria Mead Chalmers (1809–1891) – The Good Resolution, The Sisters
- Aidan Chambers (1934–2025) – Seal Secret, The Present Takers
- Maisie Chan (born 1977) – Danny Chung Does Not Do Maths, Keep Dancing, Lizzie Chu, Nate Yu's Blast from the Past
- Neelam Saxena Chandra (born 1969) – Five Tales, Tales from Sundervan, Pankhudiyaan, Chanda
- Scott Chantler (born 1972) – Two Generals, Three Thieves, NorthWest Passage
- Charles III (born 1948) – The Old Man of Lochnagar
- Geoffrey Chaucer (c. 1343–1400) – Chanticleer and the Fox (from The Canterbury Tales)
- Nan Chauncy (1900–1970) – They Found a Cave, Tiger in the Bush, Devils' Hill, Tangara
- Sylvia Chen – Tricky Chopsticks, Sparkles for Sunny: A Lunar New Year Story
- Simon Cheshire (born 1964) – Saxby Smart: Private Detective, Pants on Fire, Operation Sting
- Ruth Chew (1920–2010) – The Wednesday Witch, What the Witch Left, The Trouble with Magic
- Lauren Child (born 1965) – Charlie and Lola series, Clarice Bean series
- Irma Chilton (1930–1990) – Take Away the Flowers
- John Christopher (1922–2012) – The Prince in Waiting series, The Tripods trilogy
- Matt Christopher (1917–1997) – Wild Pitch, The Kid Who Only Hit Homers, Tough to Tackle
- Korney Chukovsky (1882–1969) – Moydodyr
- Ella Rodman Church (1831–1912) – A Christmas Wreath, for Little People, Little Pilgrim series
- Mrs. Henry Clarke (1853–1908) – Miss Merivale's Mistake, Put to the Proof
- Pauline Clarke (1921–2013) – The Twelve and the Genii
- Beverly Cleary (1916–2021) – Ramona Quimby series
- Andrew Clements (1949–2019) – Frindle, A Week in the Woods
- Eleanor Clymer (1906–2001) – The Trolley Car Family
- Susan Clymer (born 1951) – Animals in Room 202 series
- Joanna Cole (1944–2020) – The Magic School Bus series
- Chris Colfer (born 1990) – The Land of Stories
- Eoin Colfer (born 1965) – Artemis Fowl series
- Sneed B. Collard III (born 1959) – Hangman's Gold, The Governor's Dog Is Missing!, Dog 4491
- Suzanne Collins (born 1962) – The Underland Chronicles, The Hunger Games trilogy
- Carlo Collodi (1826–1890) – The Adventures of Pinocchio
- Joséphine Colomb (1833–1892) – La fille de Carilès
- Padraic Colum (1881–1972) – The King of Ireland's Son
- John Amos Comenius (1592–1670) – Orbis Sesualim Pictis (The Visible World in Pictures)
- Ying Chang Compestine (born 1963) – Secrets of the Terra-Cotta Soldier, The Chinese Emperor's New Clothes
- Harriet Theresa Comstock (1860–1925) – Molly the Drummer Boy, Janet of the Dunes
- Jane Leslie Conly (born 1948) – Racso and the Rats of NIMH, R-T, Margaret, and the Rats of NIMH, Crazy Lady!
- Susan Coolidge (1835–1905) – What Katy Did series
- Barbara Cooney (1917–2000) – Chanticleer and the Fox, Miss Rumphius
- Susan Cooper (born 1935) – The Dark Is Rising series, The Boggart
- Esther Copley (1786–1851) – Early Friendships
- Zizou Corder – Lionboy series
- William Corlett (1938–2005) – The Magician's House series
- Rachel Cosgrove (1922–1998) – The Hidden Valley of Oz
- Frank Cottrell-Boyce (born 1959) – Millions, Framed, Chitty Chitty Bang Bang Flies Again
- John Cotton (1585–1652) – Milk for Babes catechism
- Bruce Coville (born 1950) – Space Brat, My Teacher Is an Alien, Aliens Ate My Homework, The Unicorn Chronicles, Magic Shop series
- Joy Cowley (born 1936) – The Silent One, Bow Down Shadrach
- Palmer Cox (1840–1924) – The Brownies series
- John Coy (born 1958) – Night Driving, Crackback
- Petre Crăciun (born 1962), Romanian writer
- Joe Craig (born 1981) – Jimmy Coates series
- Ion Creangă (1837–1889) – Childhood Memories, The Goat and Her Three Kids, Harap Alb, Ivan Turbincă, Dănilă Prepeleac
- Sharon Creech (born 1945) – Walk Two Moons, Ruby Holler, Heartbeat
- Helen Cresswell (1934–2005) – The Bagthorpe Saga
- Richmal Crompton (1890–1969) – Just William
- Michael Cronin (born 1942) – Against the Day series
- Gillian Cross (born 1945) – Wolf, The Great Elephant Chase, The Demon Headmaster series
- Sarah Crossan – The Weight of Water, Apple and Rain, One
- Kevin Crossley-Holland (born 1941) – Storm, The Seeing Stone
- Catherine Crowe (1790–1872) – Pippie's Warning; or, Mind Your Temper
- Gabriella Csire (born 1938) – Turpi series
- John Cunliffe (1933–2018) – Postman Pat series; Rosie & Jim series
- Jane Louise Curry (born 1932) – Abaloc series, Poor Tom's Ghost, The Egyptian Box, The Black Canary
- Judi Curtin (born 1960s) – Alice & Megan series, Time after Time series
- Chara M. Curtis – How Far to Heaven, All I See Is Part of Me, No One Walks on My Father's Moon, Fun Is a Feeling

== D ==
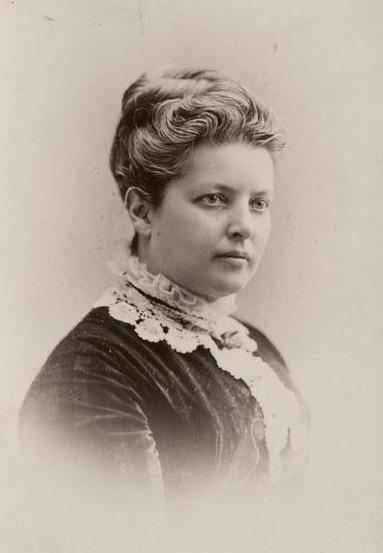
Mary Mapes Dodge

- Debbie Dadey (born 1959) – The Adventures of the Bailey School Kids
- Roald Dahl (1916–1990) – Charlie and the Chocolate Factory, Matilda, The BFG, James and the Giant Peach, The Witches, Fantastic Mr Fox
- Alice Dalgliesh (1893–1979) – The Bears on Hemlock Mountain, The Courage of Sarah Noble, The Silver Pencil
- Annie Dalton (born 1948) – Angels Unlimited series, Afterdark series
- Elisabetta Dami (born 1958) – Geronimo Stilton series
- David Scott Daniell (1906–1965) – Young English, Mission for Oliver, The Dragon and the Rose, By Jiminy
- Lucy Daniels (born 1960) – Animal Ark, Dolphin Diaries
- Paula Danziger (1944–2004) – The Cat Ate My Gymsuit, Amber Brown series
- James Dashner (born 1972) – The 13th Reality series, The Maze Runner series
- Alan Davidson (born 1943) – Annabel series, Light, The Bewitching of Alison Allbright
- Stephen Mark Davies (born 1976) – Sophie series, Hacking Timbuktu, Outlaw
- Lavinia R. Davis (1909–1961) – The Wild Birthday Cake, Buttonwood Island, Donkey Detectives
- Mary Hayes Davis (c.1884–1948) – Chinese Fables and Folk Stories (with Chow Leung)
- Thomas Day (1748–1789) – The History of Little Jack, The History of Sandford and Merton
- Cecil Day-Lewis (1904–1972) – Dick Willoughby, The Otterbury Incident
- Jean D'Costa (born 1937) – Escape to Last Man Peak
- Edmondo De Amicis (1846–1908) – Heart (Cuore)
- Marguerite de Angeli (1889–1987) – The Door in the Wall, Black Fox of Lorne, Bright April
- Jeanne de Cavally (1926–1992) – Pouê-pouê, le petit cabri
- Walter de la Mare (1873–1956) – The Three Mulla Mulgars, Songs of Childhood, Peacock Pie, Collected Stories for Children
- Silvana De Mari (born 1953) – The Last Dragon
- Terry Deary (born 1946) – The Fire Thief, Master Crook's Crime Academy series
- Barthe DeClements (1920–2019) – Nothing's Fair in Fifth Grade
- Jan Deberitz (1950–2014) – Morgentåkedalen (Morning Fog Valley)
- Daniel Defoe (1660–1731) – Robinson Crusoe
- Meindert DeJong (1906–1991) – The Wheel on the School, The House of Sixty Fathers
- Tomie dePaola (1934–2020) – Strega Nona, 26 Fairmount Avenue
- Lavinia Derwent (1909–1989) – Tammy Troot, Sula
- Kate DiCamillo (born 1964) – Because of Winn Dixie, The Tale of Despereaux, The Miraculous Journey of Edward Tulane, Flora & Ulysses: The Illuminated Adventures
- Charles Dickens (1812–1870) – A Christmas Carol, Oliver Twist, The Magic Fishbone
- Peter Dickinson (1927–2015) – The Changes trilogy, Tulku, City of Gold, Eva, The Kin
- Miep Diekmann (1925–2017) – The Haunted Island, Just a Street, Slave Doctor
- Anne Digby (born 1935) – Trebizon series
- Thomas M. Disch (1940–2008) – The Brave Little Toaster, The Brave Little Toaster Goes to Mars
- Tony DiTerlizzi (born 1969) – The Spiderwick Chronicles, Beyond the Spiderwick Chronicles
- Franklin W. Dixon (Stratemeyer house pseudonym from 1927) – The Hardy Boys series
- Rex Dixon (1908–1971) – Pocomoto series
- Chris D'Lacey (born 1954) – The Fire Within series
- Lynley Dodd (born 1941) – Hairy Maclary, Slinky Malinki
- Mary Mapes Dodge (1831–1905) – Hans Brinker or the Silver Skates
- Julia Donaldson (born 1948) – The Gruffalo, Monkey Puzzle, The Troll
- Amanda Minnie Douglas (1831–1916) – A Little Girl series, Helen Grant series, A Modern Cinderella
- Marian Douglas (1842–1913) – Picture Poems for Young People
- Beatriz Doumerc (1929–2014) – La línea, Daniel y los reyes
- Siobhan Dowd (1960–2007) – The London Eye Mystery, Bog Child
- Debra Doyle (1952–2020) – School of Wizardry, Knight's Wyrd
- Roddy Doyle (born 1958) – Not Just for Christmas, Wilderness
- Tonke Dragt (1930–2024) – The Letter for the King, The Secrets of the Wild Wood
- Crescent Dragonwagon (born 1952) – Always, Always, Home Place, Half a Moon and One Whole Star
- Anna Harriett Drury (also Harriet, 1824–1912) – The Three Half-Crowns: a story for boys, Richard Rowe's Parcel
- William Pène du Bois (1916–1993) – The Twenty-One Balloons
- Diane Duane (born 1952) – So You Want to Be a Wizard
- Ursula Dubosarsky (born 1961) – The Red Shoe, The Golden Day, The Blue Cat
- Tessa Duder (born 1940) – Alex Archer series, Tiggie Tompson series
- Florence Dugdale (1879–1937) – The Book of Baby Birds
- Lois Duncan (1934–2016) – I Know What You Did Last Summer, A Gift of Magic
- Jeanne DuPrau (born 1944) – The Books of Ember series
- Lynda Durrant (born 1954) – The Beaded Moccasins, Echohawk. Betsy Zane, the Rose of Fort Henry
- Gerald Durrell (1925–1995) – The Donkey Rustlers, The Fantastic Flying Journey
- Christine Dzidrums (born 1971) – Cutters Don't Cry, Gabby Douglas: Golden Smile, Golden Triumph

== E ==
- Edward Eager (1911–1964) – Half Magic, Magic by the Lake, Knight's Castle, The Time Garden, The Well-Wishers, Magic or Not, Seven-Day Magic
- Marion Eames (1921–2007) – Sionyn a Siarli, Huw a'r Adar Aur, Y Tir Tywyll (in Welsh)
- Martin Ebbertz (born 1962) – Little Mr. Jaromir
- Irmengarde Eberle (1898–1979)
- Walter D. Edmonds (1903–1998) – The Matchlock Gun, Bert Breen's Barn
- Dorothy Edwards (1914–1982) – My Naughty Little Sister, The Witches and the Grinnygog
- Julie Edwards (Dame Julie Andrews) (born 1935) – The Last of the Really Great Whangdoodles
- Leo Edwards (1884–1944) – Jerry Todd series, Poppy Ott series
- Monica Edwards (1912–1998) – Punchbowl Farm series, Romney Marsh series
- Stephen Elboz (born 1956) – The Byzantium Bazaar
- T. S. Eliot (1888–1965) – Old Possum's Book of Practical Cats
- E. C. Eliott (1908–1971) – Kemlo and Tas series
- David Elliott (born 1947) – Bull, Evangeline Mudd and the Great Mink Escapade, Knitty Kitty
- Janice Elliott (1931–1995) – The Sword and the Dream
- Zetta Elliott (born 1972) – Bird, Dragons in a Bag, A Place Inside of Me
- Sarah Ellis (born 1952) – Pick-Up Sticks
- Jonathan Emmett (born 1965) – Bringing Down the Moon, Someone Bigger, The Princess and the Pig
- Michael Ende (1929–1995) – The Neverending Story, Momo, Jim Button and Luke the Engine Driver
- Margarita Engle (born 1951) – The Surrender Tree: Poems of Cuba's Struggle for Freedom
- Elizabeth Enright (1909–1968) – The Melendy series, Thimble Summer, Gone-Away Lake
- Hans Magnus Enzensberger (1929–2022) – The Number Devil, Where Were You, Robert?
- Louise Erdrich (born 1954) – The Birchbark House, The Game of Silence
- John R. Erickson (born 1943) – Hank the Cowdog
- Eleanor Estes (1908–1988) – The Moffats, Rufus M., The Hundred Dresses, Ginger Pye
- Juliana Horatia Ewing (1841–1885) – A Flat Iron for a Farthing, The Story of a Short Life

== F ==
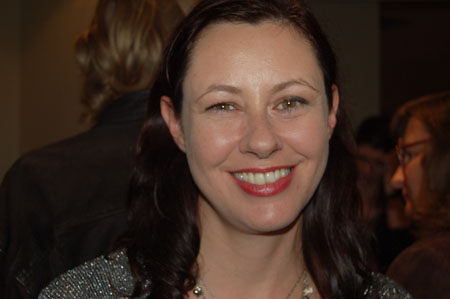
Kate Forsyth

- John Meade Falkner (1858–1932) – Moonfleet
- Eleanor Farjeon (1881–1965) – Martin Pippin in the Apple Orchard, The Little Bookroom
- Walter Farley (1915–1989) – The Black Stallion series
- Nancy Farmer (born 1941) – The House of the Scorpion, The Ear, the Eye and the Arm, A Girl Named Disaster
- Penelope Farmer (born 1939) – Charlotte Sometimes, The Summer Birds, A Castle of Bone
- G. E. Farrow (1862 – c. 1920) – The Wallypug of Why, The Little Panjandrum's Dodo
- Gertrude Minnie Faulding (1875–1961) – Old Man's Beard and Other Tales
- Tim Federle – Better Nate Than Ever, The Great American Whatever
- Eliza Fenwick (1766–1840) – Mary and Her Cat, Visits to the Junior Library
- Ruby Ferguson (1899–1966) – Jill's Gymkhana, A Stable for Jill, Jill's Pony Trek
- Chitra Fernando (1935–1998) – Glass Bangles, The Adventures of Senerat Bandara, Bempi Appu
- Arkady Fiedler (1894–1985) – Robinson Crusoe Island, Orinoco
- Eugene Field (1850–1895) – Wynken, Blynken, and Nod
- Sarah Fielding (1710–1768) – The Governess, or The Little Female Academy
- Anne Fine (born 1947) – The Tulip Touch, Madame Doubtfire, Goggle-Eyes, Flour Babies
- Nadia Fink (born 1977) – Anti-Princess series and Anti-Hero series
- Martha Finley (1828–1909) – Elsie Dinsmore series, Mildred Keith series
- Francis J. Finn (1859–1928) – Tom Playfair, That Football Game, Bobby in Movieland
- John Finnemore (1863–1915) – Teddy Lester series, The Wolf Patrol, Two Boys in War-Time
- Aileen Fisher (1906–2002) – We Alcotts, I Heard a Bluebird Sing
- Catherine Fisher (born 1957) – The Snow-Walker, The Book of the Crow, The Oracle, Corbenic
- Dorothy Canfield Fisher (1879–1958) – Understood Betsy
- John D. Fitzgerald (1906–1988) – The Great Brain series
- Louise Fitzhugh (1928–1974) – Harriet the Spy, Nobody's Family Is Going to Change
- Philippe Fix (born 1937)
- Marjorie Flack (1897–1958) – The Story of Ping, Angus and the Ducks
- John Flanagan (1944–2026) – Ranger's Apprentice series
- Paul Fleischman (born 1952) – Bull Run, Joyful Noise: Poems for Two Voices
- Sid Fleischman (1920–2010) – The Whipping Boy, By The Great Horn Spoon!
- Ian Fleming (1908–1964) – Chitty Chitty Bang Bang
- Shamini Flint (born 1969) – Ten: A Soccer Story, Diary of a Soccer Star, The Seeds of Time, Sasha Visits series
- James Foley (born 1982) – Stellarphant, Chickensaurus, Brobot, In the Lion
- Esther Forbes (1891–1967) – Johnny Tremain
- Antonia Forest (1915–2003) – Autumn Term, Falconer's Lure and other Marlow Family books
- Kate Forsyth (born 1966) – The Gypsy Crown, The Puzzle Ring, Dragon Gold
- Elena Fortún (1886–1952) – Celia, lo que dice, Celia en el colegio
- Helen Fox (born 1962) – Eager series
- Mem Fox (born 1946) – Possum Magic, Guess What?, Wombat Divine
- Anne Frank (1929–1945) – The Diary of a Young Girl
- Barbara C. Freeman (1906–1999) – Two-Thumb Thomas, Timi, the Tale of a Griffin
- Don Freeman (1908–1978) – Corduroy
- Pamela Freeman (born 1960) – The Willow Tree's Daughter, The Black Dress, Cherryblossom and the Golden Bear
- Jackie French (born 1953) – Hitler's Daughter, Diary of a Wombat, Pete the Sheep, School for Heroes
- Frieda Friedman (born 1905, date of death unknown) – Dot for Short, Pat and Her Policeman, Carol from the Country
- Cornelia Funke (born 1958) – The Thief Lord, Inkheart series
- Sandy Fussell (born 1960) – Samurai Kids series, Polar Boy
- Rose Fyleman (1877–1957) – Fairies and Chimneys, The Fairy Green, The Dolls' House
- Fynn (pseudonym of Sydney Hopkins, 1919–1999) – Mister God, This Is Anna

== G ==
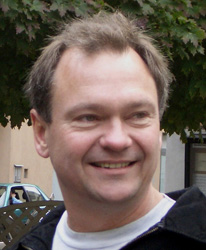
Paul Geraghty

- Jostein Gaarder (born 1952) – Sophie's World, The Christmas Mystery
- Wanda Gág (1893–1946) – Millions of Cats, The ABC Bunny
- Eva Roe Gaggin (1879–1966) – Down Ryton Water, An Ear for Uncle Emil
- Arkady Gaidar (1904–1941) – Timur and His Squad
- Neil Gaiman (born 1960) – Coraline, The Graveyard Book
- Aleksandra Gajewska (born 1971) – Plamka i las pełen tajemnic
- Paul Gallico (1897–1976) – The Snow Goose, Manxmouse, Jennie, The Day the Guinea-Pig Talked
- Jane Gardam (1928–2025) – A Long Way from Verona, The Summer After the Funeral, The Hollow Land
- Sally Gardner – The Countess's Calamity, I, Coriander, The Red Necklace
- Leon Garfield (1921–1996) – Devil-in-the-Fog, Smith, The God Beneath the Sea, John Diamond
- Howard R. Garis (1873–1962) – Uncle Wiggily Longears series, Baseball Joe series
- Lilian Garis (1873–1954) – Let's Make Believe series, Girl Scouts series, Melody Lane series
- Alan Garner (born 1934) – The Owl Service, The Weirdstone of Brisingamen, The Moon of Gomrath, Elidor, Red Shift, The Stone Book Quartet
- Eve Garnett (1900–1991) – The Family from One End Street
- Doris Gates (1901–1987) – Blue Willow
- Margaret Gatty (1809–1873) – Parables from Nature, Aunt Judy's Tales
- Jamila Gavin (born 1941) – 'Let's Make Believe series, Girl Scouts series, Melody Lane series'Coram Boy, Grandpa Chatterji
- Béatrice Lalinon Gbado (born 1984) – Beautiful Debo, Bovi series, Kaïvi series
- Anna Genover-Mas (born 1963) – The Grumpy Gardener
- Jean Craighead George (1919–2012) – My Side of the Mountain, Julie of the Wolves
- Jessica Day George (born 1976) – Princess of the Midnight Ball, Dragon Slippers
- Paul Geraghty (born 1959) – Slobcat, The Hoppameleon
- Adèle Geras (born 1944) – Apricots at Midnight, The Girls in the Velvet Frame, The Fabulous Fantoras
- Charles "Father Goose" Ghigna (born 1946) – Mice Are Nice, Riddle Rhymes, A Fury of Motion: Poems for Boys
- May Gibbs (1877–1969) – Snugglepot and Cuddlepie
- Patricia Reilly Giff (1935–2021) – The Polk Street School series, Lily's Crossing, Pictures of Hollis Woods, Eleven, Storyteller
- Fred Gipson (1908–1973) – Old Yeller
- Abelard Giza (born 1980) – Hania, Tyśka i Szajka Brudziaków, Mucha Lena, Mucha Lena 2: Król Brokatu
- Debi Gliori (born 1959) – Pure Dead series, Mr Bear series, Witch Baby series, The Tobermory Cat, What's the Time, Mr Wolf?
- Rumer Godden (1907–1998) – The Doll's House, The Mousewife, The Diddakoi
- Glenda Goertzen (born 1967) – The Prairie Dogs, City Dogs
- John Henry Goldfrap (1879–1917) – The Ocean Wireless Boys, The Boy Aviators, The Dreadnought Boys
- Julia Golding (born 1969) – The Diamond of Drury Lane, Secret of the Sirens
- Oliver Goldsmith (1730–1774) – The History of Little Goody Two-Shoes
- Elizabeth Goudge (1900–1984) – The Little White Horse, Linnets and Valerians
- Candy Gourlay (born 1962) – Tall Story, Shine, Bone Talk
- Harry Graham (1874–1936) – Ruthless Rhymes for Heartless Homes
- Kenneth Grahame (1859–1932) – The Wind in the Willows
- Hardie Gramatky (1907–1979) – Little Toot
- Mary Grannan (1900–1975) – Just Mary, Maggie Muggins
- John Grant (1930–2014) – Little Nose stories
- Nicholas Stuart Gray (1922–1981) – Grimbold's Other World, The Seventh Swan
- Alain Grée (1936–2025) – Keith and Sally Out and About
- John Green (born 1977) – Looking for Alaska, An Abundance of Katherines, Paper Towns, The Fault in Our Stars, Will Grayson, Will Grayson, Let It Snow
- Roger Lancelyn Green (1918–1987) – King Arthur and His Knights of the Round Table, The Luck of Troy
- Kate Greenaway (1846–1901) – Under the Window
- Frances Nimmo Greene (1867–1937) – Legends of King Arthur and His Court
- Graham Greene (1904–1991) – The Little Train, The Little Fire Engine, The Little Horse Bus, The Little Steamroller
- James Greenwood (1832–1929) – The True History of a Little Ragamuffin
- Kristiana Gregory (born 1951) – Earthquake at Dawn, The Stowaway, Jenny of the Tetons
- Grey Owl (1888–1938) – The Adventures of Sajo and Her Beaver People
- Andy Griffiths (born 1961) – The Bad Book, Just Tricking, The 13-Storey Treehouse, Treasure Fever!
- Jacob and Wilhelm Grimm (1785–1863 and 1786–1859) – Grimm's Fairy Tales
- Maria Gripe (1923–2007) – Hugo and Josephine, In the Time of the Bells, Elvis and His Secret
- John Grisham (born 1955) – Theodore Boone: Kid Lawyer series
- Annie Groovie (born 1970) – Léon series
- Johnny Gruelle (1880–1938) – Raggedy Ann series
- Jacqueline Guest (fl. 1999–2018) – Free Throw, Triple Threat, Death by Dinosaur
- Kristín Helga Gunnarsdóttir (born 1963) – Fiasol series
- Dan Gutman (born 1955) – The Million Dollar Shot, Baseball Card Adventures, My Weird School series
- Bethan Gwanas (born 1962) – Llinyn Trôns, Sgôr

== H ==
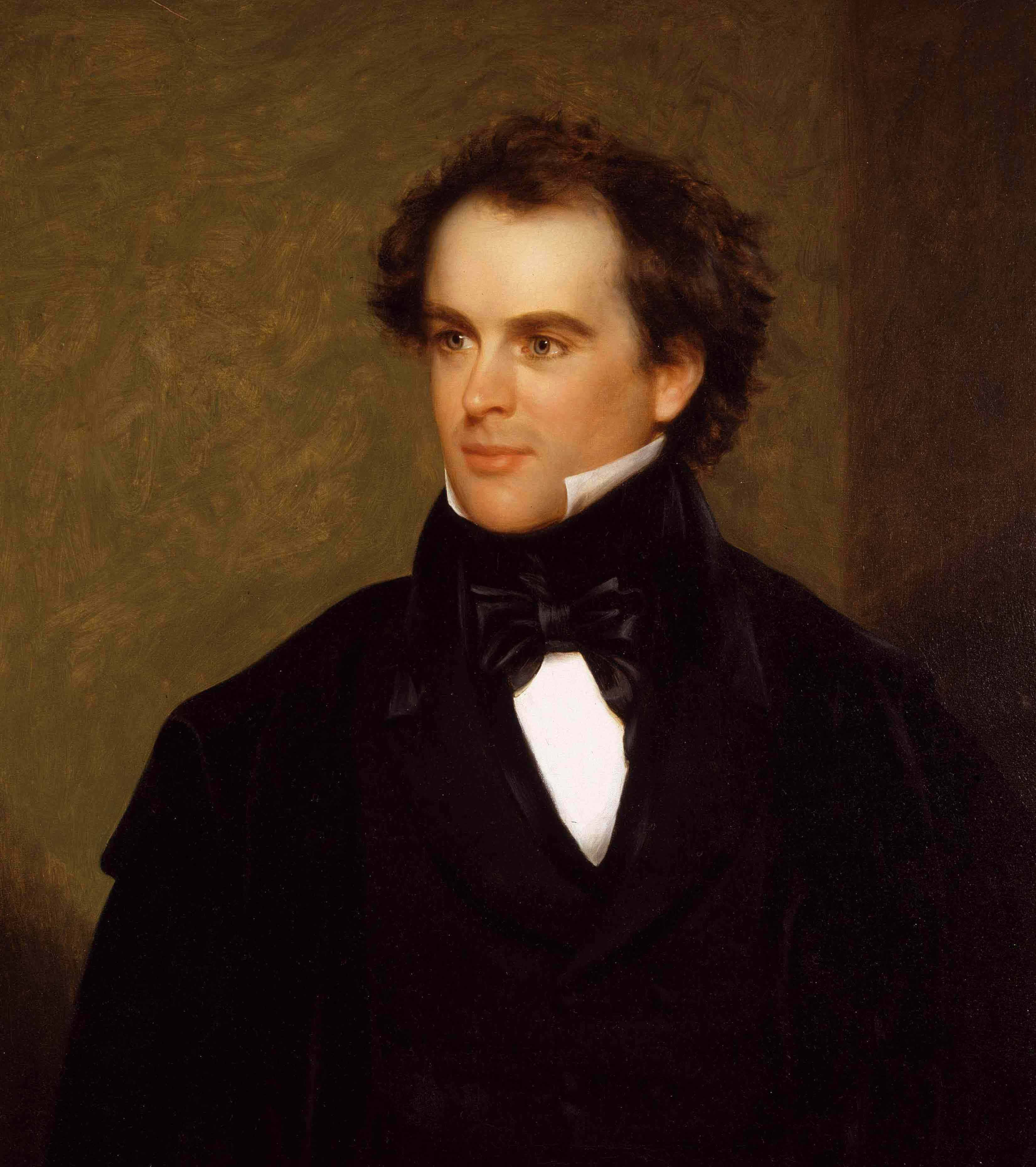
Nathaniel Hawthorne

- Maria Hack (1777–1844) – Winter Evenings, Harry Beaufoy, or, The Pupil of Nature
- Margaret Peterson Haddix (born 1964) – Shadow Children series
- Mark Haddon (born 1962) – The Curious Incident of the Dog in the Night-Time, Agent Z series
- Matt Haig (born 1975) – Shadow Forest, A Boy Called Christmas
- J. B. S. Haldane (1892–1964) – Mr Friend Mr Leakey
- Virginia Hamilton (1936–2002) – M. C. Higgins the Great
- Leif Hamre (1914–2007) – Otter Three Two Calling, Contact Lost, Blue Two ... Bale Out
- H. Irving Hancock (1866–1922) – High School Boys series, West Point series, Young Engineers series
- Joyce Hansen (born 1942) – The Gift-Giver, The Captive, I Thought My Soul Would Rise and Fly
- Frances Hardinge (born 1973) – Fly by Night, The Lie Tree
- Roger Hargreaves (1935–1988) – Mr. Men series, Little Miss series
- Cynthia Harnett (1893–1981) – The Wool-Pack, The Load of Unicorn, The Writing on the Hearth
- Amanda Bartlett Harris (1824–1917) – How We Went Birds' Nesting, Little Folks' Every Day Book
- Joel Chandler Harris (1845–1908) – Uncle Remus
- Mary K. Harris (1905–1966) – Emily and the Headmistress, The Bus Girls, Seraphina
- Rosemary Harris (1923–2019) – The Moon in the Cloud, A Quest for Orion, Zed
- Edith Ogden Harrison (1862–1955) – Prince Silverwings, The Star Fairies
- Lisi Harrison (born 1970) – The Clique series, Alpha series, Monster High books
- Peter Härtling (1933–2017) – Oma, Ben liebt Anna, Krücke
- Sonya Hartnett (born 1968) – The Silver Donkey, The Children of the King
- Juanita Havill (born 1949) – Jamaica series, Eyes Like Willy's
- Charles Hawes (1889–1923) – The Dark Frigate, The Great Quest
- Barbara Haworth-Attard (born 1953) – TruthSinger, To Stand on My Own, A Trail of Broken Dreams
- Nathaniel Hawthorne (1804–1864) – A Wonder-Book for Girls and Boys, Tanglewood Tales
- Carolyn Haywood (1898–1990) – Betsy series, Eddie series
- Helen Haywood (1907–1995) – Peter Tiggywig series
- Carol Hedges – Jigsaw, Spy Girl series
- Florence Parry Heide (1919–2011) – The Shrinking of Treehorn
- Helme Heine (1941–2025) – The Secret of the Elephant's Poohs, Friends
- Robert A. Heinlein (1907–1988) – Rocket Ship Galileo, Have Space Suit—Will Travel
- Racey Helps (1913–1970) – Barnaby Littlemouse series
- Kevin Henkes (born 1960) – Kitten's First Full Moon, The Year of Billy Miller, Olive's Ocean, Waiting
- Zenna Henderson (1917–1983) – Ingathering: The Complete People Stories
- Marguerite Henry (1902–1997) – King of the Wind, Misty of Chincoteague
- Nat Hentoff (1925–2017) – This School Is Driving Me Crazy, The Day They Came to Arrest the Book
- G. A. Henty (1832–1902) – Out on the Pampas, The Young Buglers, The Cat of Bubastes, With Lee in Virginia, Beric the Briton
- James Herriot (1916–1995) – All Creatures Great and Small, James Herriot's Treasury for Children
- Karen Hesse (born 1952) – Out of the Dust, The Music of Dolphins
- Carl Hiaasen (born 1953) – Hoot
- Clifford B. Hicks (1920–2010) – First Boy on the Moon, The Marvelous Inventions of Alvin Fernald
- Donna Barba Higuera – Lupe Wong Won't Dance, The Last Cuentista
- E. W. Hildick (1925–2001) – Jack McGurk mysteries, Jim Starling series
- Lorna Hill (1902–1991) – A Dream of Sadler's Wells
- Nigel Hinton (born 1941) – Buddy, Beaver Towers
- S. E. Hinton (born 1948) – The Outsiders, That Was Then, This Is Now, Rumble Fish
- Russell Hoban (1925–2011) – The Mouse and His Child
- Will Hobbs (born 1947) – Bearstone, Beardream, Ghost Canoe, Go Big or Go Home
- Michael Hoeye (born 1947) – Hermux Tantamoq series
- E. T. A. Hoffmann (1776–1822) – The Nutcracker and the Mouse King
- Heinrich Hoffmann (1809–1894) – Der Struwwelpeter
- Mary Hoffman (born 1945) – Stravaganza series, Amazing Grace
- Barbara Hofland (1770–1844) – The Son of a Genius, The Blind Farmer and His Children, The Young Crusoe
- Christophe Honoré (born 1970) – Tout contre Léo
- Laura Lee Hope (Stratemeyer house pseudonym from 1904) – Bobbsey Twins series
- Isabel Hornibrook (1859–1952) – Camp and Trail
- Anthony Horowitz (born 1955) – Alex Rider series, The Diamond Brothers series, The Gatekeepers series
- Hasan Hourani (1974–2003) – Hassan Everywhere
- James Howe (born 1946) – Bunnicula, Pinky and Rex, Houndsley and Catina
- Janni Howker – The Nature of the Beast, Badger on the Barge
- Carol Hughes (born 1955) – Jack Black and the Ship of Thieves, Dirty Magic, The Princess and the Unicorn
- Ted Hughes (1938–1998) – The Iron Man
- Thomas Hughes (1822–1896) – Tom Brown's School Days
- Shirley Hughes (1927–2022) – Dogger, Hero on a Bicycle, Ella's Big Chance, Alfie series
- John Hulme (born 1970) – The Seems series
- Irene Hunt (1907–2001) – Up a Road Slowly, The Lottery Rose
- Erin Hunter (joint pseudonym from 2003) – Warriors series, Seekers series
- Norman Hunter (1899–1995) – Professor Branestawm series
- Emily Huws (born 1942) – Cyfres Corryn: Chwannen, Lol neu Lwc?
- Zach Hyman (born 1992) – The Magician's Secret, Hockey Hero, The Bambino and Me
- Tuuli Hypén (born 1983) – Veikan metsäretki, Veikka ja talvi

== I ==
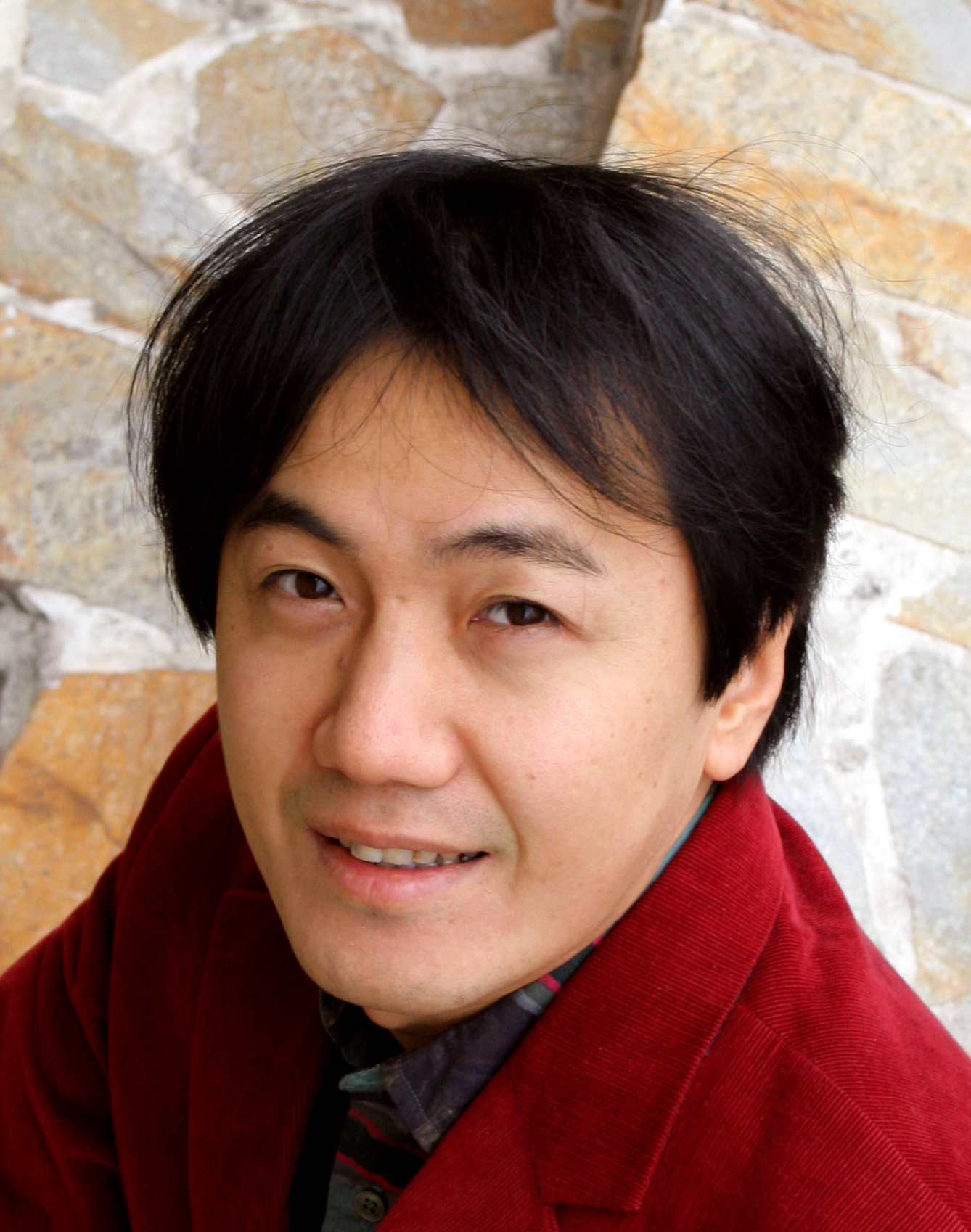
Koji Ishikawa

- Eva Ibbotson (1925–2010) – Which Witch?, The Secret of Platform 13, Journey to the River Sea
- Theodor Illek (born 1984) – The Golden Key
- Jean Ingelow (1820–1897) – Mopsa the Fairy
- Mick Inkpen (born 1962) – Kipper the Dog series, Wibbly Pig series
- Mary E. Ireland (1834–1927) – Timothy and His Friends
- Washington Irving (1783–1859) – "The Legend of Sleepy Hollow", "Rip Van Winkle"
- Koji Ishikawa (born 1963) – Colorful Animals Hide and Seek series
- Petre Ispirescu (1830–1887) – Romanian Legends or Fairy Tales, Greuceanu
- Oksana Ivanenko (1906–1997) – Forest Tales

== J ==
- Joseph Jacobs (1854–1916) – English Fairy Tales, Celtic Fairy Tales, European Folk and Fairy Tales
- Brian Jacques (1939–2011) – Redwall series, Castaways of the Flying Dutchman
- Grace James – John and Mary series, Green Willow and Other Japanese Fairy Tales
- Victoria Jamieson – When Stars Are Scattered, Roller Girl
- James Janeway (1636–1674) – A Token for Children
- Éva Janikovszky (1926–2003) – If I Were a Grown-Up, Who Does This Kid Take After?
- Tove Jansson (1914–2001) – Moomin series
- Annie Jay (born 1957) – Complot à Versailles, À la poursuite d'Olympe
- Richard Jefferies (1848–1887) – Wood Magic, Bevis
- Theodora Robinson Jenness (1847–1935) – Two Young Homesteaders, Piokee, Above the Range
- Paul Jennings (born 1943) – Unreal!, Undone!, Unbelievable!, The Paw Thing, The Gizmo, Wicked series
- W. E. Johns (1893–1968) – Biggles series, Worrals series
- Annie Fellows Johnston (1863–1931) – The Little Colonel, Miss Santa Claus of the Pullman
- Diana Wynne Jones (1934–2011) – Chrestomanci series, Howl's Moving Castle, Dogsbody
- Lara Jones (1975–2010) – Poppy Cat series
- Marcia Thornton Jones (born 1958) – The Adventures of the Bailey School Kids series, Ghostville Elementary series
- T. Llew Jones (1915–2009) – Trysor Plas y wernen, Anturiaethau Twm Siôn Cati: Y Ffordd Beryglus
- Terry Jones (1942–2020) – Fairy Tales, The Saga of Erik the Viking, Squire series
- Alma Jordan – Tales from Riverside Farm series
- Mary Catherine Judd (1852–1930s) – Classic Myths, Wigwam Stories
- Jacqueline Jules (born 1956) – Zapato Power series, Unite or Die: How Thirteen States Became a Nation
- Norton Juster (1929–2021) – The Phantom Tollbooth, The Hello, Goodbye Window
- May Justus (1898–1989) – Gabby Gaffer, Luck for Little Lihu, New Boy in School

== K ==
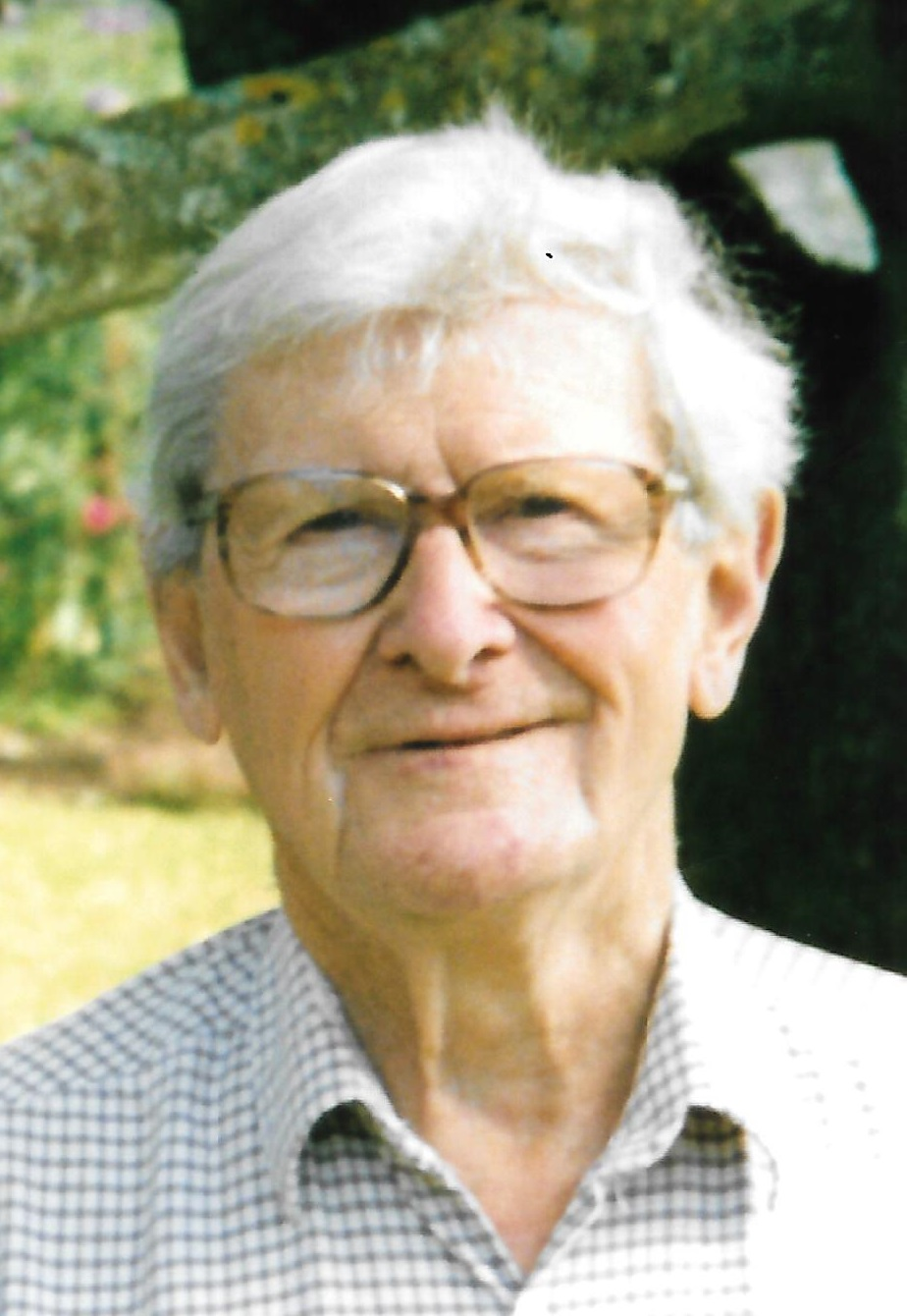
Dick King-Smith

- Keri Kaa (1942–2020) – Taka Ki Ro Wai
- Cynthia Kadohata (born 1956) – Kira-Kira, Weedflower, The Thing About Luck
- Eiko Kadono (born 1935) – Kiki's Delivery Service
- Joan Kahn (1914–1994) – Ladies and Gentlemen, said the Ringmaster, Seesaw, You Can't Catch Me
- Maira Kalman (born 1949) – Fireboat, Max Stravinsky: Poet-Dog series
- Ulrich Karger (born 1957) – The Scary Sleepover
- Jan Karon (born 1937) – Miss Fannie's Hat
- Erich Kästner (1899–1974) – Emil and the Detectives, Lottie and Lisa, The Flying Classroom
- Elizabeth Kay (born 1949) – The Divide trilogy
- Annie Keary (1825–1879) – Heroes of Asgard
- Ezra Jack Keats (1916–1983) – The Snowy Day, Whistle for Willie, Goggles!
- Carolyn Keene (Stratemeyer house pseudonym from 1930) – Nancy Drew mystery series
- Charles Keeping (1924–1988) – Charley, Charlotte and the Golden Canary
- Harold Keith (1903–1998) – Rifles for Watie
- Eric P. Kelly (1884–1960) – The Trumpeter of Krakow
- Gene Kemp (1926–2015) – The Turbulent Term of Tyke Tiler, The Pride of Tamworth Pig
- Louise Andrews Kent (1886–1969) – He Went with Marco Polo, He Went with Hannibal, Two Children of Tyre
- Judith Kerr (1923–2019) – When Hitler Stole Pink Rabbit, The Tiger Who Came To Tea
- Lady Amabel Kerr (1846–1906) – A Bible Picture Book for Catholic Children, Lives of the Saints for Children
- P. B. Kerr (1956–2018) – Children of the Lamp series
- Alexander Key (1904–1979) – Escape to Witch Mountain, The Forgotten Door, The Case of the Vanishing Boy
- Dorothy Kilner (1755–1836) – The Life and Perambulation of a Mouse
- Garry Kilworth (born 1941) – The Welkin Weasels series, Knights of Liöfwende series, Attica
- Clive King (1924–2018) – Stig of the Dump
- Dick King-Smith (1922–2011) – The Sheep-Pig, The Queen's Nose
- Charles Kingsley (1819–1875) – The Water Babies, The Heroes
- Jeff Kinney (born 1971) – Diary of a Wimpy Kid series
- Rudyard Kipling (1865–1936) – Just So Stories, The Jungle Book, Puck of Pook's Hill
- Ole Lund Kirkegaard (1940–1979) – Frode og alle de andre rødder, Otto Is a Rhino
- Jim Kjelgaard (1910–1959) – Kalak of the Ice, Fire-Hunter, The Spell of the White Sturgeon, Wolf Brother
- Jon Klassen (born 1981) – This Is Not My Hat
- Annette Curtis Klause (born 1953) – Blood and Chocolate
- Anne Knight (1792–1860) – School-Room Lyrics, Mary Gray
- Nellie van Kol (1851–1930) – Ons Blaadje
- E. L. Konigsburg (1930–2013) – From the Mixed Up Files of Mrs. Basil E. Frankweiler, The Second Mrs. Giaconda, The View from Saturday
- Robin Koontz (born 1954) – In a Cabin in a Wood, Leaps and Creeps: How Animals Move to Survive
- Janusz Korczak (1878–1942) – King Matt the First, Kaytek the Wizard
- Gordon Korman (born 1963) – This Can't Be Happening at Macdonald Hall, Swindle
- Conor Kostick (born 1964) – Epic, Saga, Edda, Move, The Book of Curses, The Book of Wishes
- Erik P. Kraft – Chocolatina, Lenny and Mel series, Miracle Wimp
- Ruth Krauss (1901–1993) – The Carrot Seed
- Adrienne Kress – Alex and the Ironic Gentleman, Timothy and the Dragon's Gate
- Uma Krishnaswami (born 1956) – Naming Maya, Monsoon
- Joseph Krumgold (1908–1980) – ...And Now Miguel, Onion John
- Guus Kuijer (born 1942) – Madelief series, Polleke series
- Kunjunni (1927–2006) – Kunjunni Kavithakal
- Jane Kurtz (born 1952) – River Friendly River Wild, Water Hole Waiting

== L ==
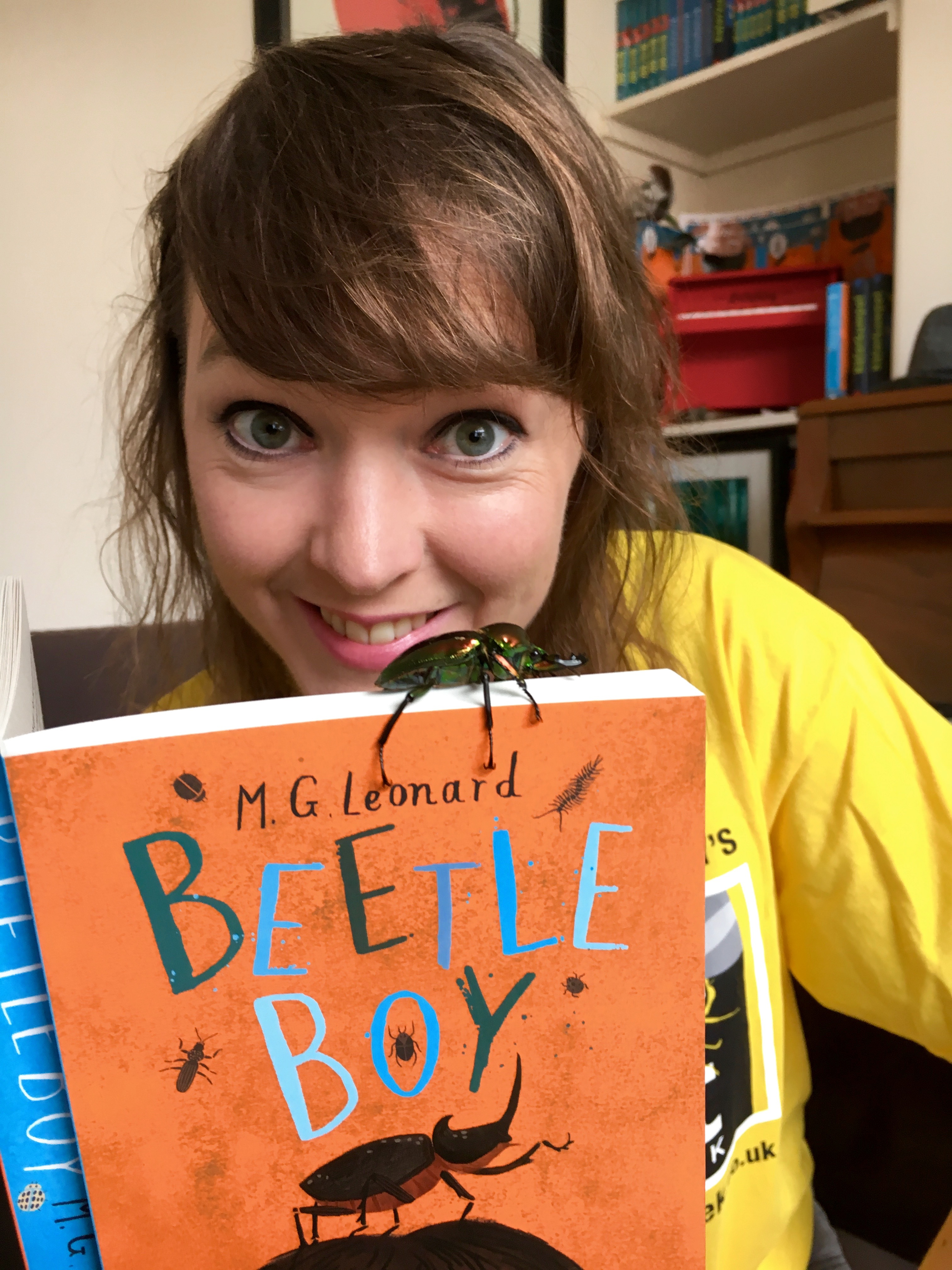
M. G. Leonard

- María Hortensia Lacau (1910–2006) – País de Silvia, Chingola y Hornerín, Yo y Hornerín, El libro de Juancito Maricaminero
- Sheila LaFarge (born 1936) – Golden Butter
- Selma Lagerlöf (1858–1940) – The Wonderful Adventures of Nils
- Elizabeth Laird (born 1943) – The Garbage King, Crusade
- Charles Lamb (1775–1834) and Mary Lamb (1764–1847) – Tales from Shakespeare
- Derek Landy (born 1974) – Skulduggery Pleasant series
- Andrew Lang (1844–1912) – The Blue Fairy Book, The Red Fairy Book, The Red Romance Book
- Noel Langley (1911–1980) – The Land of Green Ginger
- Katherine Langrish – Troll Fell, Troll Mill, Troll Blood
- Jane Langton (1922–2018) – The Hall Family Chronicles
- Jennifer Lanthier (born 1964) – The Mystery of the Martello Tower, The Stamp Collector
- Kirby Larson – The Magic Kerchief, Hattie Big Sky
- Kathryn Lasky (born 1944) – Guardians of Ga'hoole series, The Night Journey
- Dorothy P. Lathrop (1891–1980) – The Fairy Circus, The Dog in the Tapestry Garden
- Caroline Lawrence (born 1954) – The Roman Mysteries
- Michael Lawrence (born 1943) – The Snottle and other Jiggy McCue books, Young Dracula, The Aldous Lexicon
- Robert Lawson (1892–1957) – Rabbit Hill, Ben and Me, They Were Strong and Good
- Ervin Lázár (1936–2006) – The Seven Headed Fairy, The Little Boy and the Lions, The Square Round Wood
- Ursula K. Le Guin (1929–2018) – Earthsea series, Very Far Away from Anywhere Else, Catwings series, Annals of the Western Shore series
- Munro Leaf (1905–1976) – The Story of Ferdinand
- Sarah Lean – A Dog Called Homeless
- Edward Lear (1812–1888) – "The Owl and the Pussycat", A Book of Nonsense
- Diana Lebacs (1947–2022) – Nanco van Bonaire, Caimins geheim
- Dennis Lee (born 1939) – Alligator Pie
- Harper Lee (1926–2016) – To Kill a Mockingbird
- Robert Leeson (1928–2013) – The Third Class Genie, It's My Life
- Madeleine L'Engle (1918–2007) – A Wrinkle in Time, Meet the Austins
- Lois Lenski (1893–1974) – Phebe Fairchild: Her Book, Indian Captive: The Story of Mary Jemison, Strawberry Girl
- M. G. Leonard – Beetle Boy, Adventures on Trains series with Sam Sedgman
- Lois Gladys Leppard (1924–2008) – Mandie series
- Peter Lerangis (born 1955) – Seven Wonders series, The Sword Thief and The Viper's Nest in The 39 Clues collaborative series, Spy X series, Abracadabra series
- Frané Lessac (born 1954) – My Little Island, The Legend of Moondyne Joe, We Are Grateful, We Are Still Here, Our Country: Where History Happened
- Helen Lester (born 1936) – Tacky the Penguin
- Gail Carson Levine (born 1947) – Ella Enchanted, The Two Princesses of Bamarre, Fairest, Dave at Night, The Wish
- Ted Lewin (1935–2021) – Peppe the Lamplighter
- C. S. Lewis (1898–1963) – The Chronicles of Narnia
- Hilda Lewis (1896–1974) – The Ship That Flew, The Gentle Falcon
- J. Patrick Lewis (born 1942) – A Hippopotamusn't, Swan Song, The House
- J. S. Lewis (born 1972) – Grey Griffins
- Naomi Lewis (1911–2009) – English translations of the works of Hans Christian Andersen
- Grace Lin (born 1974) – Where the Mountain Meets the Moon, The Year of the Dog
- Anne Lindbergh (1940–1993) – The People of Pineapple Place, The Worry Week, Nick of Time
- Astrid Lindgren (1907–2002) – Pippi Longstocking, Ronia the Robber's Daughter
- Norman Lindsay (1879–1969) – The Magic Pudding, The Flyaway Highway
- Eva Lindström (born 1952) – The Cat Hat, Olli och Mo, My Dog Mouse
- Eric Linklater (1899–1974) – The Wind on the Moon, The Pirates in the Deep Green Sea
- Leo Lionni (1910–1999) – Inch by Inch, Swimmy, Frederick, Alexander and the Wind-Up Mouse
- Jean Little (1932–2020) – Mine for Keeps, From Anna, Orphan at My Door
- Penelope Lively (born 1933) – The Ghost of Thomas Kempe, A Stitch in Time
- Monteiro Lobato (1882–1948) – Sítio do Picapau Amarelo series
- Mira Lobe (1913–1995) – The Snowman Who Went for a Walk, Little I Am Me
- Hugh Lofting (1886–1947) – Doctor Dolittle series
- Jack London (1876–1916) – The Call of the Wild, White Fang
- Lois Lowry (born 1937) – Number the Stars, The Giver, Anastasia Krupnik series
- Nina Lugovskaya (1918–1993) – The Diary of a Soviet Schoolgirl, 1932–1937
- Janet Lunn (1928–2017) – The Root Cellar, The Hollow Tree
- Petre Luscalov (1927–2004) – Ostrovul Lupilor, Fiul munților
- Patricia Lynch (c. 1894–1972) – The Turf-Cutter's Donkey, Brogeen series
- Elinor Lyon (1921–2008) – The House in Hiding, Carver's Journey, Run Away Home

== M ==
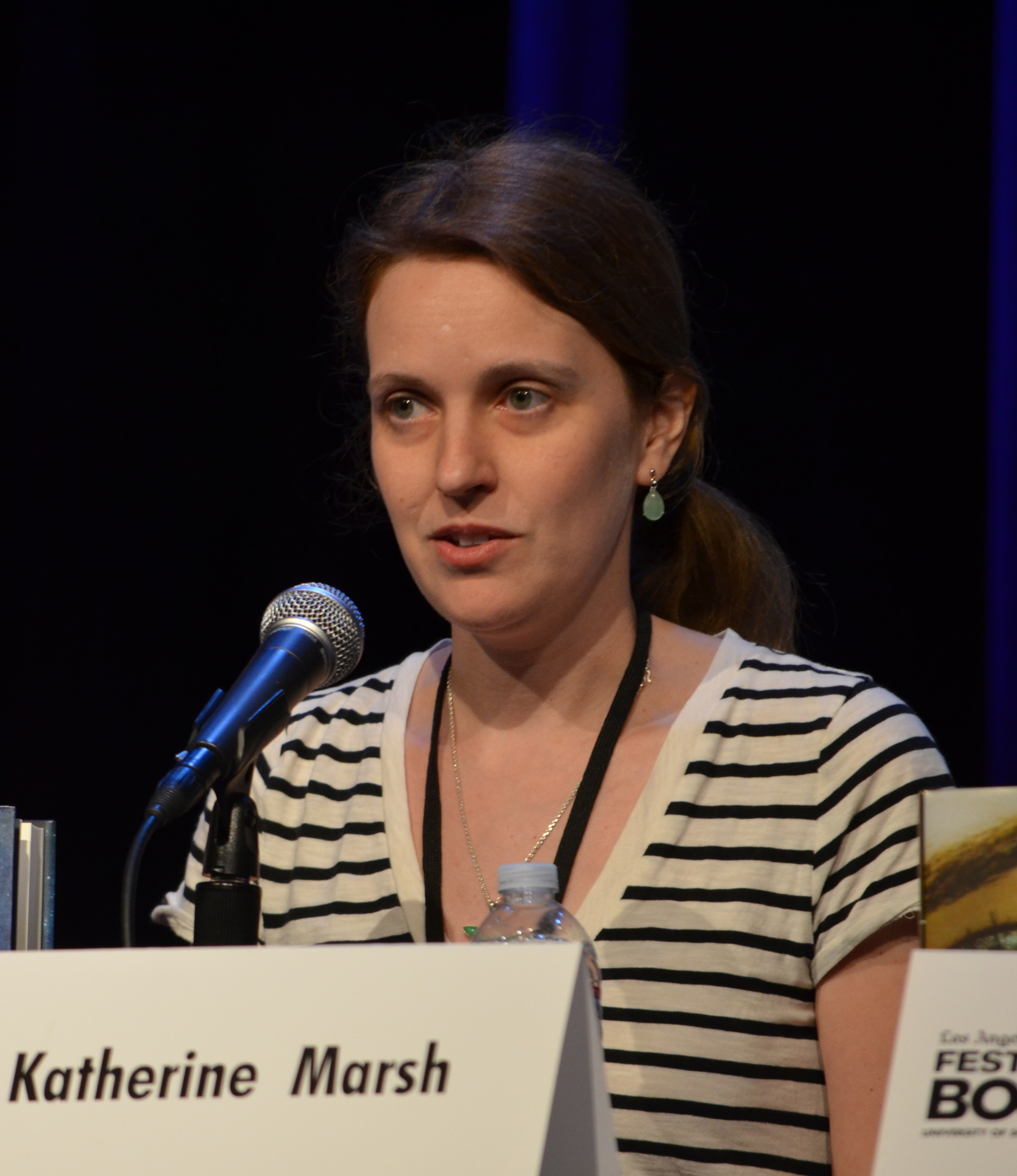
Katherine Marsh

- Annette Macarthur-Onslow (1933–2026) – Uhu, The Giant Bamboo Happening
- Amy MacDonald (born 1951) – Little Beaver and the Echo, Rachel Fister's Blister
- Betty MacDonald (1908–1958) – Mrs. Piggle-Wiggle series
- George MacDonald (1824–1905) – At the Back of the North Wind, The Princess and the Goblin
- Ellen MacGregor (1906–1954) – Miss Pickerell series
- Reginald James MacGregor – The Young Detectives
- D. J. MacHale (born 1955) – The Pendragon Adventure
- Božena Mačingová (1922–2017) – Danuška
- George Mackay Brown (1921–1996) – The Two Fiddlers, Pictures in the Cave, Six Lives of Fankle the Cat
- Angus MacVicar (1908–2001) – The Lost Planet
- Sandra Magsamen (born 1959) – The Gift
- Margaret Mahy (1936–2012) – The Haunting, The Changeover, Maddigan's Fantasia, Memory
- Hector Malot (1830–1907) – Nobody's Boy (Sans Famille)
- Clare Mallory (1913–1991) – Merry Begins, Juliet Overseas, The League of the Smallest
- Ruth Manning-Sanders (1888–1988) – A Book of Dragons and other anthologies of fairy tales from around the world (A Book of ... series)
- Daniel P. Mannix (1911–1997) – The Fox and the Hound
- Alicia Catherine Mant (1788–1869) – Christmas, a Happy Time, Ellen, or The Young Godmother
- Margaret Manuel (fl. 2010) – I See Me
- Emilia Marryat (c. 1835–1875) – Amongst the Maoris
- Frederick Marryat (1792–1848) – The Children of the New Forest
- John Marsden (1950–2024) – Tomorrow series
- Katherine Marsh (born 1974) – The Night Tourist, Jepp, Who Defied the Stars
- James Edward Marshall (1942–1992), as James Marshall and/or Edward Marshall – Fox in Love, Fox and His Friends, Fox on Wheels
- Ann M. Martin (born 1955) – The Babysitters Club series
- Emily Winfield Martin – Dream Animals, Oddfellow's Orphanage
- J. P. Martin (1880–1966) – Uncle series
- Cissy van Marxveldt (1889–1948) – Joop ter Heul series
- John Masefield (1878–1967) – The Midnight Folk, The Box of Delights
- Cotton Mather (1663–1728) – A Token for the Children of New England
- André Maurois (1885–1967) – Fattypuffs and Thinifers
- Mercer Mayer (born 1943) – Little Critter series, Little Monster series
- James Mayhew (born 1964) – Miranda the Explorer, Ella Bella Ballerina, The Knight Who Took All Day
- William Mayne (1928–2010) – A Swarm in May (Choir School series), A Grass Rope, Earthfasts, Low Tide
- Geraldine McCaughrean (born 1951) – Peter Pan in Scarlet, A Pack of Lies
- Robert McCloskey (1914–2003) – Make Way for Ducklings, Time of Wonder, Blueberries for Sal
- Eloise McGraw (1915–2000) – The Golden Goblet, The Moorchild, The Rundelstone of Oz
- Lauren Lynn McGraw (1915–2000) – Merry Go Round in Oz
- Lurline Wailana McGregor (fl. 2008) – Between the Deep Blue Sea and Me
- Sharon E. McKay (born 1954) – Charlie Wilcox, Our Canadian Girl: Penelope series
- David McKee (1935–2022) – Toucan Two Can, Not Now, Bernard, Elmer the Patchwork Elephant
- Robin McKinley (born 1952) – The Hero and the Crown, The Blue Sword, Spindle's End
- Patricia McKissack (1944–2017) – Christmas in the Big House, Christmas in the Quarters, Never Forgotten
- Colin McNaughton (born 1951) – Captain Abdul's Pirate School
- Janet McNeill (1907–1994) – My Friend Specs McCann, The Battle of St. George Without
- Karen McQuestion – Celia and the Fairies, Edgewood
- Geoffrey McSkimming (born 1962) – Cairo Jim series
- L. T. Meade (1854–1914) – A World of Girls
- Stephen W. Meader (1892–1977) – Boy with a Pack
- Daisy Meadows – Rainbow Magic series
- Joe Medicine Crow (1913–2016) – Counting Coup: Becoming a Crow Chief on the Reservation and Beyond, Brave Wolf and the Thunderbird
- Milton Meltzer (1915–2009) – The Black Americans, The American Revolutionaries, Mark Twain Himself
- Jean Merrill (1923–2012) – The Pushcart War
- Laurence Meynell (1899–1989) – The Old Gang
- Karin Michaëlis (1872–1950) – Bibi
- Richard Michelson (born 1953) – Animals That Ought to Be: Poems about Imaginary Pets, Across the Alley
- Katherine Milhous (1894–1977) – The Egg Tree
- Olive Beaupre Miller (1883–1968) – My Book House series
- Sibley Miller – Breyer Wind Dancers series
- A. A. Milne (1882–1956) – Winnie-the-Pooh, The House at Pooh Corner, When We Were Very Young
- Elyne Mitchell (1913–2002) – Silver Brumby series
- Ingvar Moe (1936–1993) – Dei må ikkje skyta Garm (They Musn't Shoot Garm)
- Walter Moers (born 1957) – The 13½ Lives of Captain Bluebear
- John Mole (born 1941) – "Variations on an old Rhyme"
- Chris Monroe (born 1962) – Monkey with a Tool Belt, Sneaky Sheep
- Frances Trego Montgomery (1858–1925) – Billy Whiskers series
- Lucy Maud Montgomery (1874–1942) – Anne of Green Gables series, Emily of New Moon
- Susanna Moodie (1803–1885) – The Little Quaker, The Sailor Brother
- Clement Clarke Moore (1779–1863) – "A Visit From St. Nicholas"
- Pat Mora (born 1942) – Pablo's Tree, A Library for Juana, Confetti, Doña Flor, A Birthday Basket for Tia
- Yuyi Morales (born 1968) – Niño Wrestles the World, Viva Frida, Little Night
- John A. Moroso (1874–1957) – Nobody's Buddy
- Michael Morpurgo (born 1943) – Why the Whales Came, The Wreck of the Zanzibar, Private Peaceful
- Farley Mowat (1921–2014) – Lost in the Barrens, Owls in the Family
- Robert Muchamore (born 1972) – CHERUB series, Henderson's Boys series
- Dhan Gopal Mukerji (1890–1936) – Kari the Elephant, Gay Neck, the Story of a Pigeon, Hindu Fables for Little Children
- Clara Mulholland (1849–1934) – The Strange Adventures of Little Snowdrop and Other Tales
- Brandon Mull (born 1974) – Fablehaven series
- Robert Munsch (born 1945) – Love You Forever, The Paper Bag Princess
- Jill Murphy (1949–2021) – The Worst Witch, The Last Noo-Noo
- Andrew Murray (born 1970) – Ghost Rescue
- Susan Musgrave (born 1951) – Gullband, Dreams Are More Real Than Bathtubs

== N ==
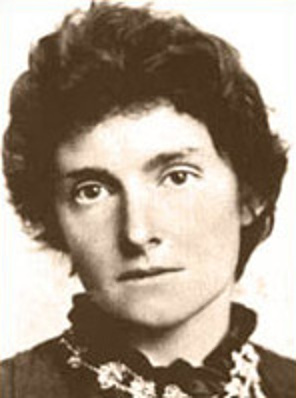
E. Nesbit

- Beverley Naidoo (born 1943) – Journey to Jo'burg, The Other Side of Truth
- Mali Madhavan Nair (1914–1994) – Mali Ramayanam, Mali Bhagavatham, Tenali Raman
- Leela Nambudiripad (1934–2021) – Neypayasam, Mithayippoti
- Claire Julie de Nanteuil (1834–1897) – Capitaine, L'Épave mystérieuse
- P. Narendranath (1934–1991) – Vikritiraman
- John Neal (1793–1876) – Great Mysteries and Little Plagues
- Violet Needham (1876–1967) – The Black Riders, The Stormy Petrel, The Woods of Windri
- John R. Neill (1877–1943) – The Wonder City of Oz, The Scalawagons of Oz, Lucky Bucky in Oz
- Marilyn Nelson (born 1946) – A Wreath for Emmett Till, Snook Alone, Ostrich and Lark
- Božena Němcová (1820–1862) – Slovak Fairy Tales and Legends, The Grandmother
- Edith Nesbit (1858–1924) – The Story of the Treasure Seekers (Bastable series), The Railway Children, Five Children and It, The Phoenix and the Carpet, The Story of the Amulet
- Patrick Ness (born 1971) – Chaos Walking trilogy, A Monster Calls, More Than This
- Emily Cheney Neville (1919–1997) – It's Like This, Cat, Berries Goodman
- John Newbery (1713–1767) – A Little Pretty Pocket-Book, intended for the Amusement of Little Master Tommy and Pretty Miss Polly with Two Letters from Jack the Giant Killer
- Beverley Nichols (1898–1983) – The Tree that Sat Down, The Stream that Stood Still, The Mountain of Magic
- Sally Nicholls (born 1983) – Ways to Live Forever, Season of Secrets, Things a Bright Girl Can Do
- Jenny Nimmo (born c. 1944) – The Snow Spider trilogy, Children of the Red King/Charlie Bone series
- Garth Nix (born 1963) – The Old Kingdom/Abhorsen series, The Keys to the Kingdom series, The Seventh Tower series
- Joan Lowery Nixon (1927–2003) – Colonial Williamsburg series, Orphan Train series
- Ethel Nokes (1883–1976) – The Fourth Form Gang, Nibs: The Story of a Pony
- Andrew Norriss (born 1947) – Aquila, The Unluckiest Boy in the World
- Grace May North (1876–1960) – Bobs, a Girl Detective, Meg of Mystery Mountain, Sisters, Adele Doring series
- Jessica Nelson North (1891–1988) – The Giant Shoe
- Sterling North (1906–1974) – Rascal, The Wolfing
- Carol Norton – pen name under which certain works of Grace May North (1876–1960) were reprinted
- Mary Norton (1903–1992) – The Borrowers series, Bedknob and Broomstick
- Nikolay Nosov (1908–1976) – The Adventures of Dunno and his Friends
- Christine Nöstlinger (1936–2018) – Fly Away Home
- Alfred Noyes (1880–1958) – The Secret of Pooduck Island, Daddy Fell into the Pond and Other Poems for Children
- Sevinj Nurugizi (born 1964) – Kite

== O ==
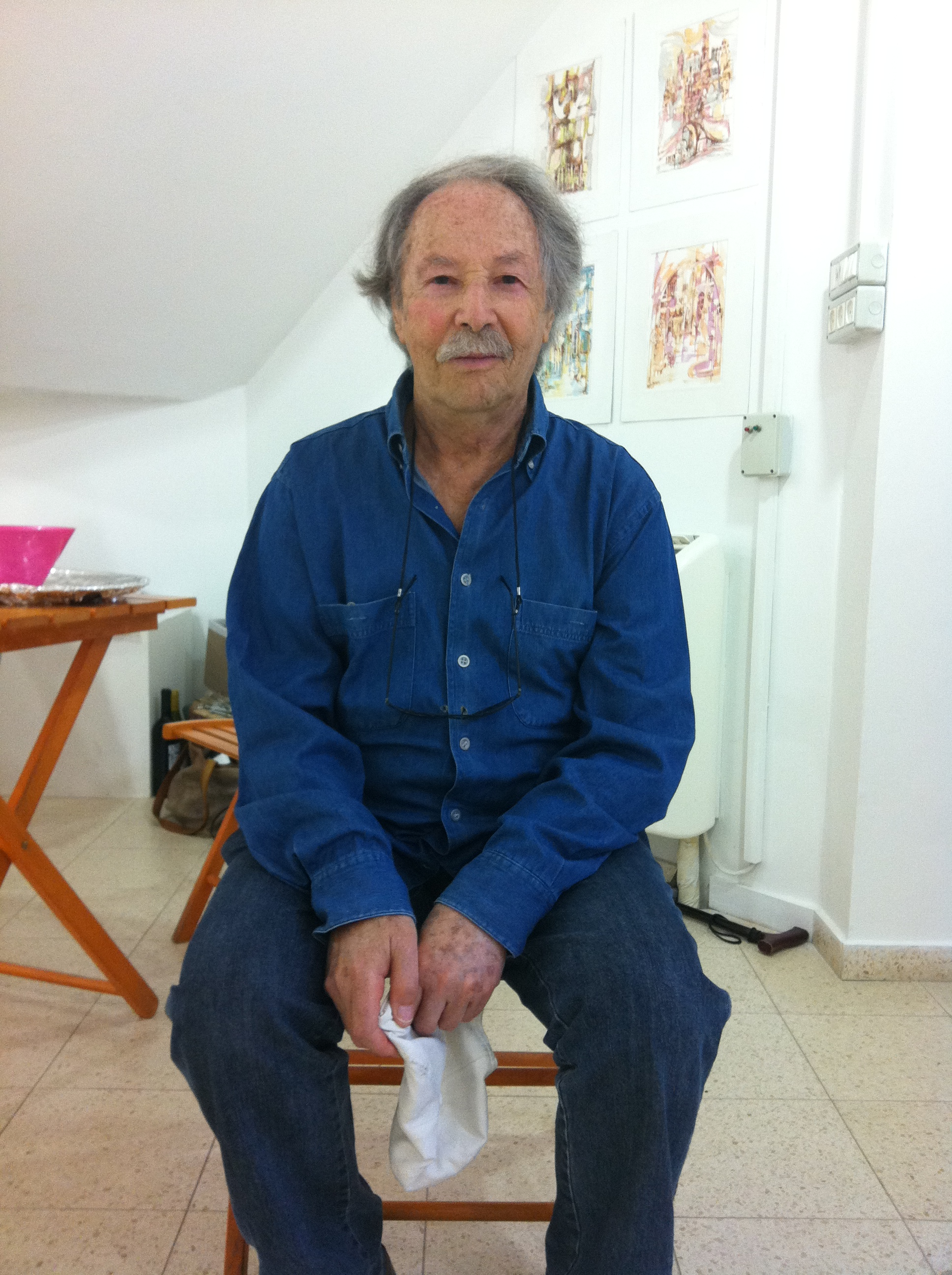
Uri Orlev

- Graham Oakley (1929–2022) – The Church Mice series, Magical Changes
- Robert C. O'Brien (1918–1973) – Mrs. Frisby and the Rats of NIMH, Z for Zachariah
- Jane O'Connor (born 1947) – Fancy Nancy series
- Scott O'Dell (1898–1989) – Island of the Blue Dolphins, The King's Fifth, The Black Pearl
- Charles Ogden (Star Farm Productions pseudonym from 2003) – Edgar & Ellen series
- Ian Ogilvy (born 1943) – Measle and the Wrathmonk, Measle and the Dragodon
- Nnedi Okorafor (born 1974) – Zahrah the Windseeker, Akata Witch series
- Jenny Oldfield (born 1949) – My Magical Pony, Home Farm Twins, Horses of Half-Moon Ranch series
- Sibylle von Olfers (1881–1916) – The Root Children, Little Princess in the Wood
- Carola Oman (1897–1978) – Ferry the Fearless
- Kenneth Oppel (born 1967) – Silverwing, Airborn
- Oliver Optic (1822–1897) – Boat Club series, Young America Abroad series
- Uri Orlev (1931–2022) – The Island on Bird Street
- Edward Ormondroyd (1925–2025) – David and the Phoenix, Castaways on Long Ago, Time at the Top
- Mary Pope Osborne (born 1949) – Magic Tree House series, Tales from the Odyssey series
- Pat O'Shea (1931–2007) – The Hounds of the Morrigan
- Elsie J. Oxenham (1880–1960) – Abbey Girls series

== P ==
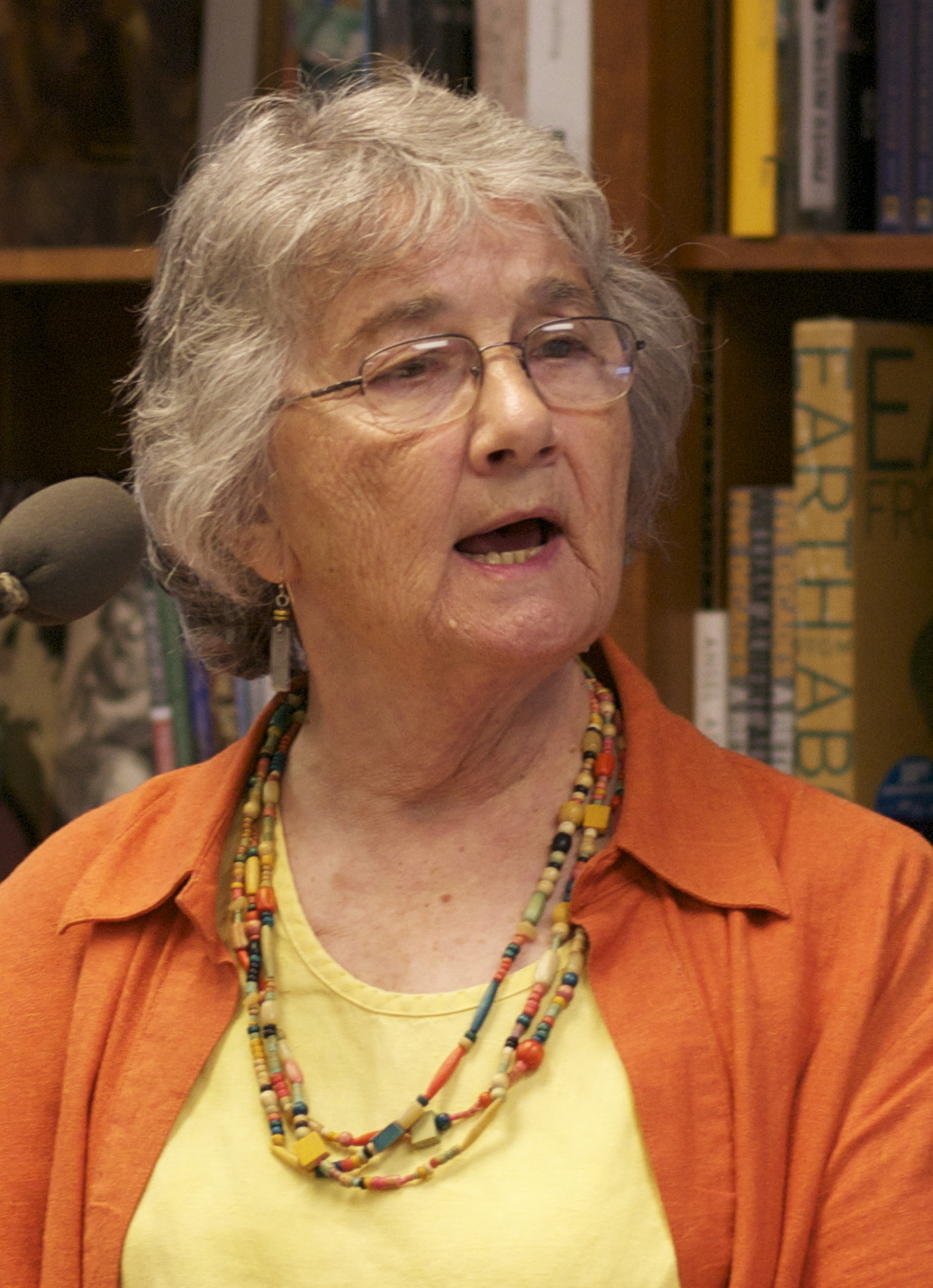
Katherine Paterson

- Roopa Pai – Taranauts, The Gita for Children
- Sippy Pallippuram (born 1943) – Oridathoru Kunjunni
- Bernard Palmer (1914–1998) – Danny Orlis series, Felicia Cartwright series
- Šukrija Pandžo (1910–1984) – Samo još kosovi zvižduću
- Christopher Paolini (born 1983) – Inheritance Cycle
- Peggy Parish (1927–1988) and Herman Parish – Amelia Bedelia series
- Barbara Park (1947–2013) – Skinnybones, Junie B. Jones series
- Linda Sue Park (born 1960) – A Single Shard
- Ruth Park (1917–2010) – The Muddle-Headed Wombat, Playing Beatie Bow
- Jenny Marsh Parker (1836–1913) – The Boy Missionary, What a Little Child Should Know
- Peter Parnall (born 1936) – Winter Barn, Apple Tree, Woodpile
- Anne Parrish (1888–1957) – The Dream Coach, Floating Island, The Story of Appleby Capple
- Katherine Paterson (born 1932) – The Master Puppeteer, Bridge to Terabithia, The Great Gilly Hopkins, Jacob Have I Loved
- Jill Paton Walsh (1937–2020) – Gaffer Samson's Luck, The Emperor's Winding Sheet
- James Patterson (born 1947) – Maximum Ride series, The Dangerous Days of Daniel X
- Gary Paulsen (1939–2021) – Hatchet, The Time Hackers
- Michelle Paver (born 1960) – Chronicles of Ancient Darkness
- Philippa Pearce (1920–2006) – Tom's Midnight Garden
- Kit Pearson (born 1947) – The Sky Is Falling, Awake and Dreaming
- Ridley Pearson (born 1953) – Peter and the Starcatchers series, The Kingdom Keepers series
- Howard Pease (1894–1974) – Secret Cargo, Highroad to Adventure, Bound for Singapore
- Dale Peck (born 1967) – Drift House series
- Ethel Pedley (1859–1898) – Dot and the Kangaroo
- Mary Louise Peebles, a.k.a. Lynde Palmer (1833–1915) – The Magnet Stories
- Bill Peet (1915–2002) – The Wump World, Hubert's Hair-Raising Adventure
- Daniel Pennac (born 1944) – The Eye of the Wolf
- Ethel Penrose (1857–1938) – Clear as the Noon Day
- Lucy Fitch Perkins (1865–1937) – Twins series
- Lynne Rae Perkins (born 1956) – Criss Cross, All Alone in the Universe
- Sarah Maria Clinton Perkins (1824–1905) – Alice and Her Friends, Eugene Cooper
- Charles Perrault (1628–1703) – Tales of Mother Goose, Little Red Riding Hood
- Aino Pervik (1932–2025) – Kunksmoor, Arabella, the Pirate's Daughter, Dear Mr Q.
- Jen Petro-Roy (born 1982) – P.S. I Miss You, Life in the Balance, You are Enough, Good Enough: A Novel
- K. M. Peyton (1929–2023) – Flambards, Fly-by-Night, Prove Yourself a Hero, Blind Beauty
- LeUyen Pham (born 1973) – Big Sister, Little Sister
- Rodman Philbrick (born 1951) – Freak The Mighty, Max the Mighty, The Last Book in the Universe, The Fire Pony
- Joan Phipson (1912–2003) – The Boundary Riders, The Family Conspiracy, Polly's Tiger
- Tamora Pierce (born 1954) – Tortall series, Circle of Magic series
- Clara D. Pierson (1868–1952) – Among the People series
- Christopher Pike (born 1964) – Spooksville series
- Dav Pilkey (born 1966) – Captain Underpants series
- Elizabeth Pinchard (fl. 1791–1820) – The Blind Child, or, Anecdotes of the Wyndham Family, The Two Cousins
- Jerry Pinkney (1939–2021) – The Lion & the Mouse, Three Little Kittens
- Daniel Pinkwater (born 1941) – The Big Orange Splot, The Hoboken Chicken Emergency
- Saviour Pirotta (born 1958) – The Orchard Book of First Greek Myths
- Annabel Pitcher (born 1982) – My Sister Lives on the Mantelpiece, Ketchup Clouds
- Sarah Pitt (fl. 1881–1900)
- Kin Platt (1911–2003) – Big Max series, The Blue Man
- Peter Pohl (born 1940) – Johnny, My Friend
- Patricia Polacco (born 1944) – Christmas Tapestry, Pink and Say
- Josephine Pollard (1834–1892) – The Brave Little Tailor, The Life of Washington, A Child's History of America: Told in One-Syllable Words, Bible Stories for Children
- Delia Lyman Porter (1858–1933) – "Time and Tommy", "How Polly Saw the Aprons Grow"
- Eleanor H. Porter (1868–1920) – Pollyanna
- Tracey Porter – Billy Creekmore
- Lidia Postma (born 1952) – The Witch's Garden, The Stolen Mirror
- Beatrix Potter (1866–1943) – The Tale of Peter Rabbit, The Tailor of Gloucester
- Ellen Potter (born c. 1960) – Olivia Kidney series
- Rhoda Power (1890–1957) – Redcap Runs Away
- Núria Pradas (born 1954) – Sota el mateix cel
- Terry Pratchett (1948–2015) – The Nome Trilogy, Johnny Maxwell series, The Amazing Maurice and his Educated Rodents, Tiffany Aching series
- Otfried Preussler (1923–2013) – The Robber Hotzenplotz, The Curse of the Darkling Mill
- Willard Price (1887–1983) – Amazon Adventure, Adventure series
- Elise Primavera (born 1955) – The Secret Order of the Gumm Street Girls
- Alison Prince (1931–2019) – My Royal Story
- Alf Prøysen (1914–1970) – Mrs. Pepperpot series
- Christine Pullein-Thompson (1925–2005) – We Rode to the Sea
- Diana Pullein-Thompson (1925–2015) – I Wanted a Pony
- Josephine Pullein-Thompson (1924–2014) – Six Ponies
- Philip Pullman (born 1946) – His Dark Materials trilogy, Clockwork, The Firework-Maker's Daughter
- Howard Pyle (1853–1911) – Otto of the Silver Hand, The Merry Adventures of Robin Hood, Men of Iron

== R ==
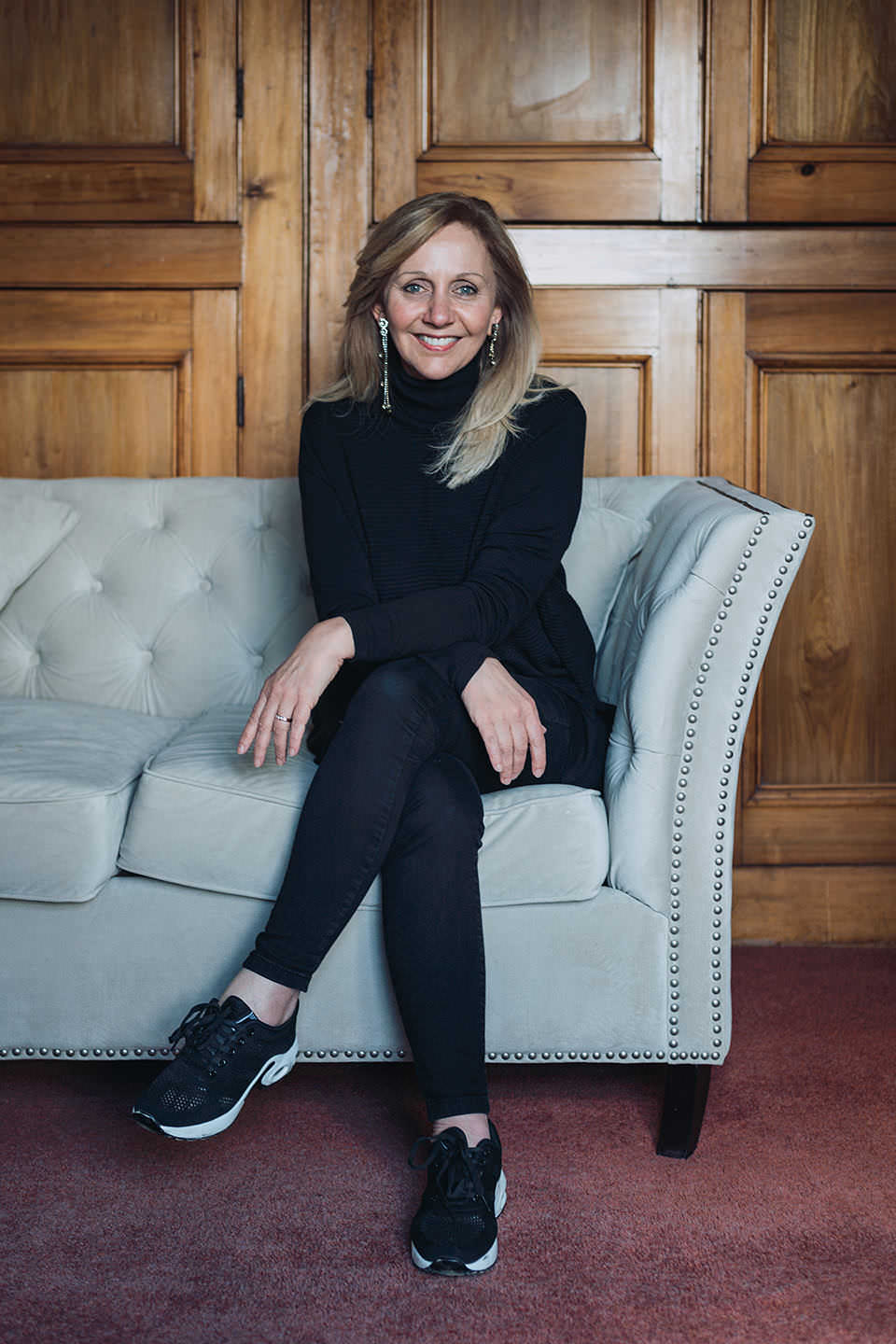
Hilary Robinson

- Gwynedd Rae (1892–1977) – Mary Plain series
- Janette Rallison (born 1966) – Fame, Glory, and Other Things on My To Do List
- María Cristina Ramos (born 1952) – La luna lleva un silencio, El trasluz
- Arthur Ransome (1884–1967) – Swallows and Amazons series
- Ellen Raskin (1928–1984) – The Westing Game, Figgs & Phantoms
- Onjali Q. Raúf (born 1981) – The Boy at the Back of the Class, The Great (Food) Bank Heist
- Marjorie Rawlings (1896–1953) – The Yearling, The Secret River
- Wilson Rawls (1913–1984) – Where the Red Fern Grows, Summer of the Monkeys
- Mary Ray (1932–2003) – The Voice of Apollo, The Ides of April
- Sukumar Ray (1887–1923) – HaJaBaRaLa, Abol Tabol, Pagla Dashu
- Helen Leah Reed (1861/62–1926) – Brenda series
- Talbot Baines Reed (1852–1893) – The Fifth Form at St. Dominic's
- W. Maxwell Reed (1871–1962) – The Earth for Sam, The Stars for Sam
- Celia Rees (born 1949) – The Bailey Game, Witch Child, Pirates!
- David Rees (1936–1993) – The Exeter Blitz, The Flying Island
- Gwyneth Rees (born 1968) – The Mum Hunt, Fairy Dust series, Mermaid Magic
- Philip Reeve (born 1966) – Buster Bayliss, Mortal Engines, Larklight
- Meta Mayne Reid (1905–1991) – Beyond the Wide World's End
- Thomas Mayne Reid (1818–1883) – The Boy Hunters, The Young Voyageurs, The Boy Tar
- Kathryn Reiss (born 1957) – Time Windows, Paint by Magic, Sweet Miss Honeywell's Revenge
- Ren Rongrong (1923–2022) – Nobrain, Neverhappy
- Adam Rex (born 1973) – The True Meaning of Smekday, Cold Cereal, Fat Vampire, Frankenstein Makes a Sandwich
- H. A. Rey (1898–1977) and Margret Rey (1906–1996) – Curious George series, Pretzel
- Lou Rhodes – The Phlunk, The Phlunk's Worldwide Symphony
- Frank Richards (1876–1961) – Greyfriars School stories featuring Billy Bunter
- Justin Richards (born 1961) – The Invisible Detective series
- Laura E. Richards (1850–1943) – Captain January, Tirra Lirra, Eletelephony
- E. J. Richmond (1825–1918) – The Jewelled Serpent
- Chris Riddell (born 1962) – The Edge Chronicles, Barnaby Grimes
- E. V. Rieu (1887–1972) – The Flattered Flying Fish and Other Poems
- Rick Riordan (born 1964) – Percy Jackson & the Olympians, The Heroes of Olympus, The Kane Chronicles, The Maze of Bones
- Jamie Rix (born 1958) – Alistair Fury series, Grizzly Tales for Gruesome Kids series
- Keith Robertson (1914–1991) – Henry Reed series
- Hilary Robinson (born 1962) – Mixed Up Fairy Tales, Where The Poppies Now Grow
- Joan G. Robinson (1910–1988) – Teddy Robinson series, When Marnie Was There
- Gary D. Robson (born 1958) – Who Pooped? series
- Gianni Rodari (1920–1980) – Telephone Tales (Favole al telefono), Tales Told by a Machine (Novelle fatte a macchina)
- Emily Rodda (born 1948) – Fairy Realm series, Rowan of Rin series, Deltora Quest series
- Don Roff (born 1966) – Scary Stories
- Manon Steffan Ros (born 1983) – Fi a Joe Allen, Llyfr Glas Nebo (The Blue Book of Nebo)
- Malcolm Rose (born 1953) – Traces series, Lawless and Tilley series
- Simon Rose (born 1961) – The Alchemist's Portrait, The Sorcerer's Letterbox, The Clone Conspiracy, The Emerald Curse, The Heretic's Tomb
- Michael Rosen (born 1946) – Sad Book, Fantastically Funny Stories, Quick, Let's Get Out of Here, We're Going on a Bear Hunt
- Amy Krouse Rosenthal – Duck! Rabbit!
- Meg Rosoff (born 1956) – How I Live Now, Just In Case, There Is No Dog, Picture Me Gone
- Diana Ross (1910–2000) – The Little Red Engine series
- Miriam Roth (1910–2005) – A Tale of Five Balloons
- Veronica Roth (born 1988) – Divergent, Insurgent, Allegiant
- J. K. Rowling (born 1965) – Harry Potter series
- Hemendra Kumar Roy (1888–1963) – Bimal-Kumar series
- Ron Roy (born 1940) – A to Z Mysteries, Capital Mysteries
- Gillian Rubinstein (born 1942) – Space Demons, Galax-Arena
- Katherine Rundell (born 1987) – The Girl Savage, Rooftoppers
- Salman Rushdie (born 1947) – Haroun and the Sea of Stories
- Rachel Renee Russell (born 1959) – Dork Diaries
- An Rutgers van der Loeff (1910–1990) – Children on the Oregon Trail, Avalanche!
- Chris Ryan (born 1961) – Alpha Force series
- Pam Muñoz Ryan (born 1951) – Esperanza Rising, Becoming Naomi León
- Amy Louisa Rye (1851–1918) – A White Child
- Cynthia Rylant (born 1954) – Missing May, Henry and Mudge series, Poppleton series

== S ==
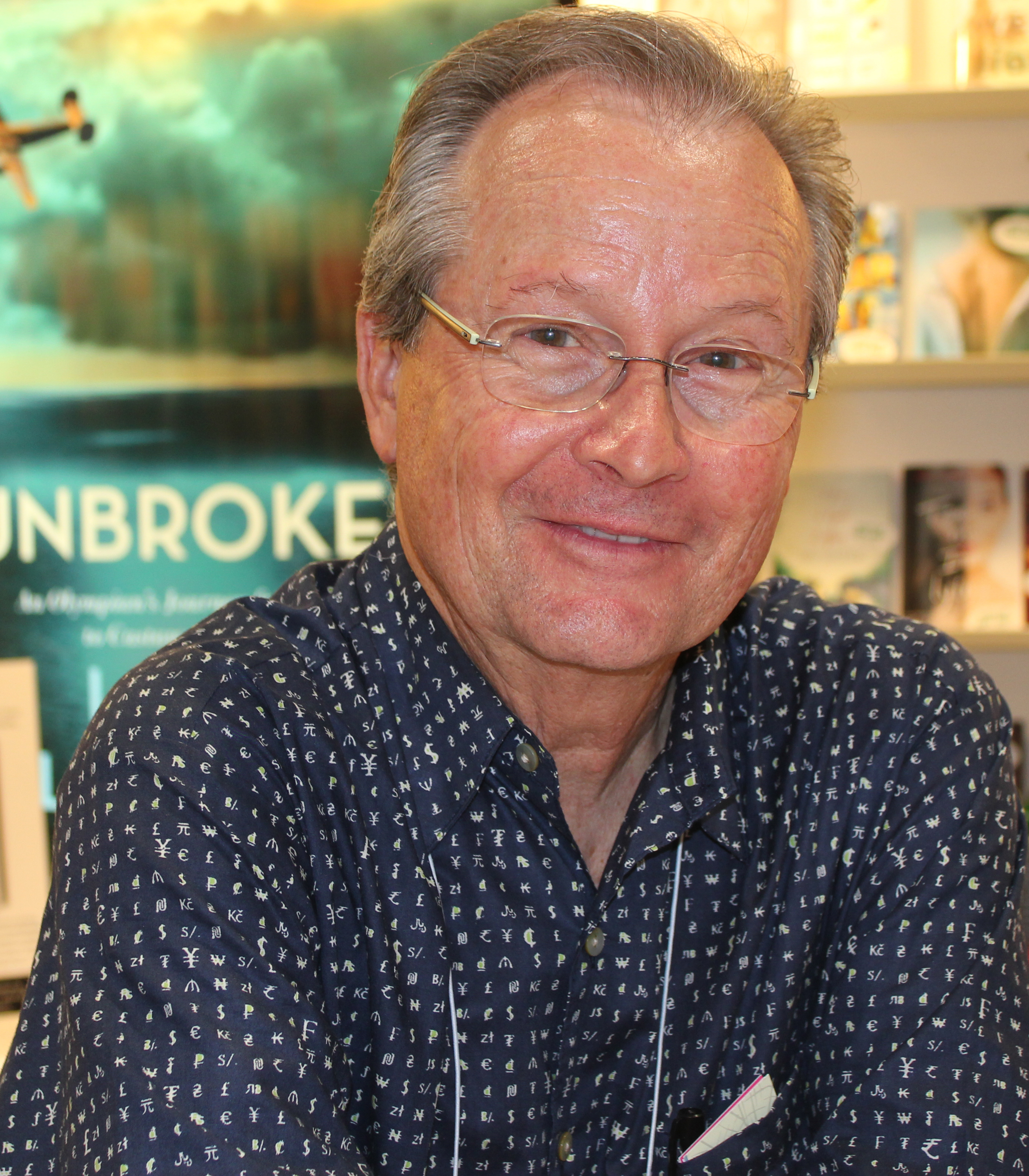
Graham Salisbury

- Louis Sachar (born 1954) – Sideways Stories From Wayside School series, Holes
- Angie Sage (born 1952) – Septimus Heap series
- Antoine de Saint-Exupéry (1900–1944) – The Little Prince
- Wylly Folk St. John (1908–1985) – The Secrets of the Pirate Inn, The Ghost Nest Door
- Emilio Salgari (1862–1911) – The Tigers of Mompracem, The Black Corsair
- Graham Salisbury (born 1944) – Under the Blood Red Sun, Calvin Coconut series
- Felix Salten (1869–1945) – Bambi
- Carl Sandburg (1878–1967) – Rootabaga Stories
- Brandon Sanderson (born 1975) – Alcatraz Versus the Evil Librarians
- Yōko Sano (1938–2010) – The Cat that Lived a Million Times
- Margaret Marshall Saunders (1861–1947) – Beautiful Joe
- Constance Savery (1897–1999) – Enemy Brothers
- Malcolm Saville (1901–1982) – Lone Pine Club series
- Ruth Sawyer (1880–1970) – Roller Skates
- Allen Say (born 1937) – Grandfather's Journey, The Ink-Keeper's Apprentice
- Kurtis Scaletta – Mudville, Mamba Point, The Tanglewood Terror
- Richard Scarry (1919–1994) – Busytown series
- Annet Schaap (born 1965) – Lampje
- Pam Scheunemann (born 1955) – Overdue Kangaroo, Ape Cape, The Crane Loves Grain
- Jon Scieszka (born 1954) – The Time Warp Trio, The True Story of the 3 Little Pigs!, Science Verse
- Miriam Schlein (1926–2004) – The Year of the Panda, I, Tut, The Way Mothers Are
- Mark Schlichting (born 1948) – Harry and the Haunted House
- Laura Amy Schlitz (born 1955) – Good Masters! Sweet Ladies! Voices from a Medieval Village
- Christoph von Schmid (1768–1854) – The Basket of Flowers, Easter Eggs
- Annie M. G. Schmidt (1911–1995) – Jip and Janneke, Abeltje, Pluk van de Petteflet
- Alvin Schwartz (1927–1992) – Scary Stories to Tell in the Dark
- Ann Scott-Moncrieff (1914–1943) – Aboard the Bulger, Auntie Robbo
- Michael Scott (born 1959) – The Secrets of the Immortal Nicholas Flamel series
- Will Scott (1893–1964) – The Cherrys series
- Sam Sedgman (born 1987) – Adventures on Trains series with M. G. Leonard, The Clockwork Conspiracy
- Laura Vaccaro Seeger – First the Egg, Green
- Countess of Ségur (1799–1874) – Sophie's Misfortunes, Good Little Girls, Monsieur Cadichon: Memoirs of a Donkey
- Tor Seidler (born 1952) – A Rat's Tale, The Wainscott Weasel, Mean Margaret
- Joshua Seigal – I Don't Like Poetry, Welcome to My Crazy Life
- George Selden (1929–1989) – The Cricket in Times Square series
- Maurice Sendak (1928–2012) – Where the Wild Things Are
- Kate Seredy (1896–1975) – The White Stag, The Good Master, The Singing Tree
- Ernest Thompson Seton (1860–1946) – Wild Animals I Have Known, Bannertail, Two Little Savages
- Dr. Seuss (1904–1991) – The Cat in the Hat, Green Eggs and Ham, How the Grinch Stole Christmas!
- David Severn (1918–2010) – Ponies and Poachers, Dream Gold, The Future Took Us
- Anna Sewell (1820–1878) – Black Beauty
- Elizabeth Missing Sewell (1815–1906) – Amy Herbert
- Miranda Seymour (born 1948) – Mumtaz the Magical Cat
- Evelyn Sharp (1869–1955) – All the Way to Fairyland, The Other Side of the Sun
- Margery Sharp (1905–1991) – The Rescuers
- Mark Shasha (born 1961) – Night of the Moonjellies
- Charles Green Shaw (1892–1974) – It Looked Like Spilt Milk
- Jane Shaw (1910–2000) – Susan Pulls the Strings
- Mary Shelley (1797–1851) – Maurice, or the Fisher's Cot
- Dorothy Sherrill (1901–1990) – The Story of a Little Gray Mouse
- Mary Martha Sherwood (1775–1851) – The History of Little Henry and his Bearer, The History of the Fairchild Family
- Gary Shipman (born 1966) and Rhoda Shipman (born 1968) – Pakkins' Land
- Uri Shulevitz (1935–2025) – The Treasure, Snow, How I Learned Geography
- Mark Shulman (born 1962) – Scrawl, Mom and Dad are Palindromes, Secret Hiding Places
- Henryk Sienkiewicz (1846–1916) – In Desert and Wilderness
- Yrsa Sigurðardóttir (born 1963) – We Want Christmas in July, Biobörn
- Shel Silverstein (1930–1999) – The Giving Tree, Where the Sidewalk Ends
- Francesca Simon (born 1955) – Horrid Henry series
- Seymour Simon (born 1931) – Einstein Anderson, Science Detective
- Ada Simond (1903–1989) – Let's Pretend series

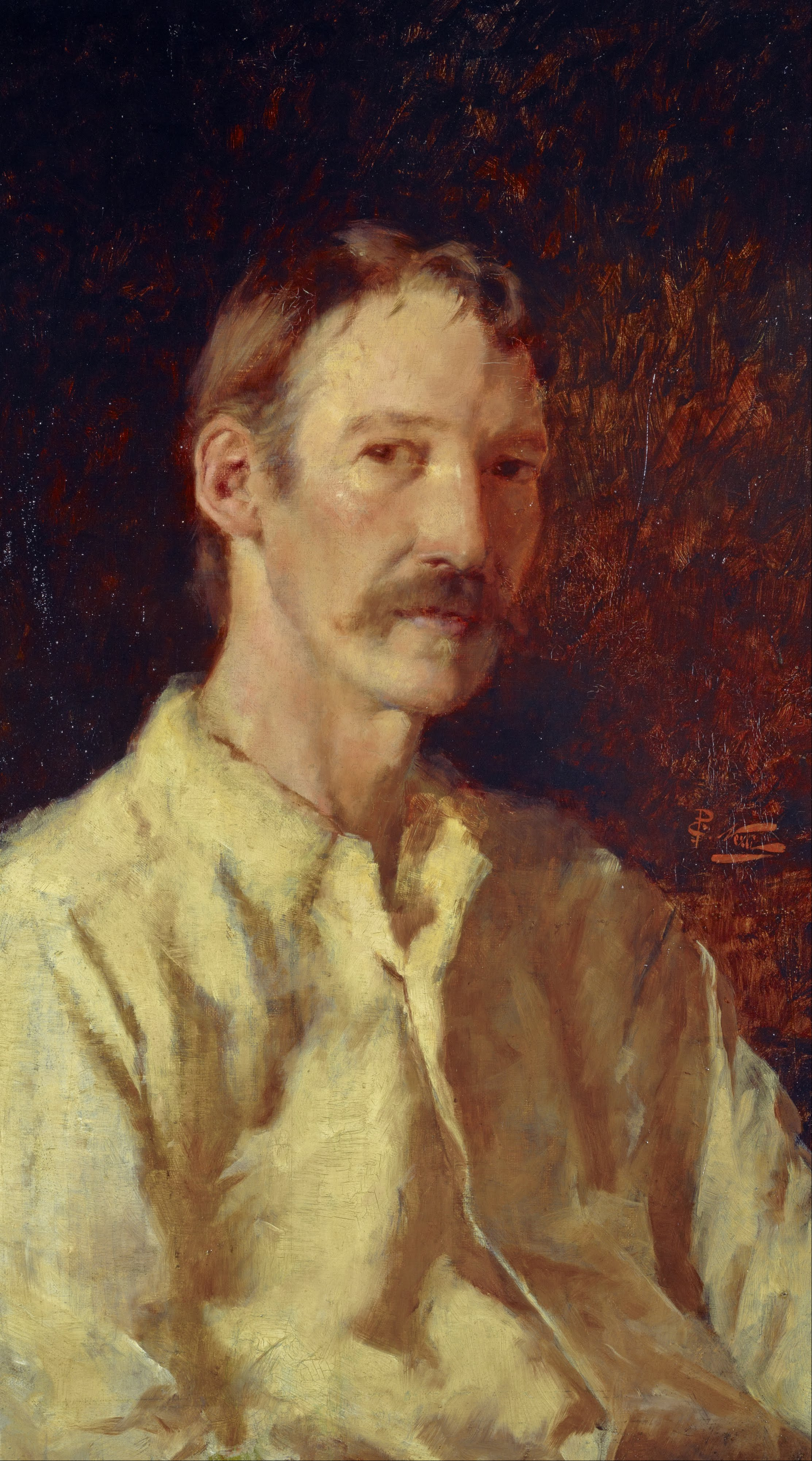
Robert Louis Stevenson

- Catherine Sinclair (1800–1864) – Holiday House: A Book for the Young
- Lester Basil Sinclair (1894–1974) – Why Cows Moo
- Isaac Bashevis Singer (1902–1991) – Zlateh the Goat and Other Stories, A Day of Pleasure, The Golem
- Marilyn Singer (born 1948) – Turtle in July
- S. Sivadas (born 1940) – Rasatantra Kathakal, Pustaka Kalikal
- Steve Skidmore (born 1960) and Steve Barlow – Outernet series
- Obert Skye – Leven Thumps series
- Ioan Slavici (1848–1925) – The Fairy Aurora, The Twins with the Golden Star
- Arthur Slade (born 1967) – Dust, The Hunchback Assignments
- William Sleator (1945–2011) – Singularity, Rewind
- Barbara Sleigh (1906–1982) – Carbonel series, Jessamy, No One Must Know, The Snowball
- Dodie Smith (1896–1990) – The Hundred and One Dalmatians
- Edward Wyke Smith (1871–1935) – The Marvellous Land of Snergs
- Georgina Castle Smith (1845–1933) – Froggy's Little Brother
- Roland Smith (born 1951) – Thunder Cave, Peak, Cryptid Hunters
- Barbara Smucker (1915–2003) – Underground to Canada, Days of Terror
- Pat Smythe (1928–1996) – Three Jays series, Adventure series
- Caroline Snedeker (1871–1956) – Downright Dencey, The Forgotten Daughter
- Lemony Snicket (born 1970) – A Series of Unfortunate Events
- Jack Snow (1907–1956) – The Magical Mimics in Oz, The Shaggy Man of Oz
- Laurel Snyder – Up and Down the Scratchy Mountains, Any Which Wall, Penny Dreadful
- Zilpha Keatley Snyder (1927–2014) – The Egypt Game, The Headless Cupid, The Witches of Worm
- Donald J. Sobol (1924–2012) – Encyclopedia Brown series, Two-Minute Mysteries series
- Angela Sommer-Bodenburg (born 1948) – The Little Vampire series
- Virginia Sorensen (1912–1991) – Miracles on Maple Hill
- Ivan Southall (1921–2008) – Josh, Ash Road, Hills End, To the Wild Sky, Bread and Honey, Fly West
- Stephen Southwold (1887–1964) – Fiddlededee: A Medley of Stories
- Elizabeth George Speare (1908–1994) – The Witch of Blackbird Pond, The Bronze Bow, The Sign of the Beaver
- Armstrong Sperry (1897–1976) – Call It Courage
- Peter Spier (1927–2017) – Noah's Ark
- Jerry Spinelli (born 1941) – Loser, Stargirl, Maniac Magee, Crash, Wringer
- Nancy Springer (born 1948) – The Enola Holmes Mysteries, Tales of Rowan Hood
- Tricia Springstubb (born 1950) – What Happened on Fox Street, In the Dark, Phoebe and Digger
- E. C. Spykman (1896–1965) – A Lemon and a Star, The Wild Angel, Terrible Horrible Edie, Edie on the Warpath
- Johanna Spyri (1827–1901) – Heidi
- Andy Stanton (born 1973) – Mr Gum series
- Dugald Steer (born 1965) – Ologies series
- William Steig (1907–2003) – Sylvester and the Magic Pebble, Doctor De Soto, Shrek!
- Andreas Steinhöfel (born 1962) – The Center of the World
- Agnieszka Stelmaszyk (born 1978) – Kroniki Archeo
- John Steptoe (1950–1989) – Stevie, Mufaro's Beautiful Daughters
- Robin Stevens (born 1988) – Murder Most Unladylike
- Robert Louis Stevenson (1850–1894) – A Child's Garden of Verses, Treasure Island, Kidnapped
- Jennifer J. Stewart – If That Breathes Fire, We're Toast!, Close Encounters of a Third World Kind
- Mary Stewart (1916–2014) – The Little Broomstick, Ludo and the Star Horse, A Walk in Wolf Wood
- Paul Stewart (born 1955) – The Edge Chronicles, Fergus Crane, Muddle Earth, Barnaby Grimes
- R. L. Stine (born 1943) – Goosebumps, Fear Street, The Nightmare Room series
- Frank R. Stockton (1834–1902) – The Lady, or the Tiger?
- Hilda van Stockum (1908–2006) – A Day on Skates, The Winged Watchman
- Margaret Storey (1926–2022) – Timothy and the Two Witches, The Stone Sorcerer, Pauline
- Walter Scott Story (1879–1955) – Skinny Harrison Adventurer
- Herbert Strang (1866–1958) – Round the World in Seven Days, King of the Air, Rob the Ranger
- Todd Strasser (born 1950) – Help! I'm Trapped... series
- Edward Stratemeyer (1862–1930) – founder of the Stratemeyer Syndicate that produced many series, most famously Rover Boys (by Stratemeyer as Arthur M. Winfield), Bobbsey Twins, Tom Swift, Hardy Boys, and Nancy Drew
- Noel Streatfeild (1895–1986) – Ballet Shoes, The Circus Is Coming, Curtain Up, White Boots, The Painted Garden (US titles Circus Shoes, Theater Shoes, Skating Shoes, Movie Shoes)
- Jakob Streit (1910–2009) – Liputto: Stories of Gnomes and Trolls
- Hesba Stretton (1832–1911) – Jessica's First Prayer
- Agnes Strickland (1796–1874) – Tales from English History for Children, The Rival Crusoes
- Charles S. Strong (1906–1962) – The Hooded Hawk Mystery, The Scarlet Slipper Mystery, Snow King: Herd Dog of Lapland
- Jeremy Strong (1949–2024) – There's a Viking in My Bed
- Jonathan Stroud (born 1970) – The Bartimaeus Trilogy, Lockwood & Co.
- Dorothy Margaret Stuart (1889–1963) – The Children's Chronicle, The Young Clavengers
- Sheila Stuart (1892–1984) – Alison's Highland Holiday
- Jennifer Sullivan (born 1945) – The Magic Apostrophe, Gwydion and the Flying Wand
- Deirdre Sullivan – Tangleweed and Brine, Prim Improper
- Rosemary Sutcliff (1920–1992) – The Eagle of the Ninth, The Lantern Bearers, The Mark of the Horse Lord, Black Ships Before Troy
- Jón Sveinsson (1857–1944) – Nonni series
- Jonathan Swift (1667–1745) – Gulliver's Travels

== T ==
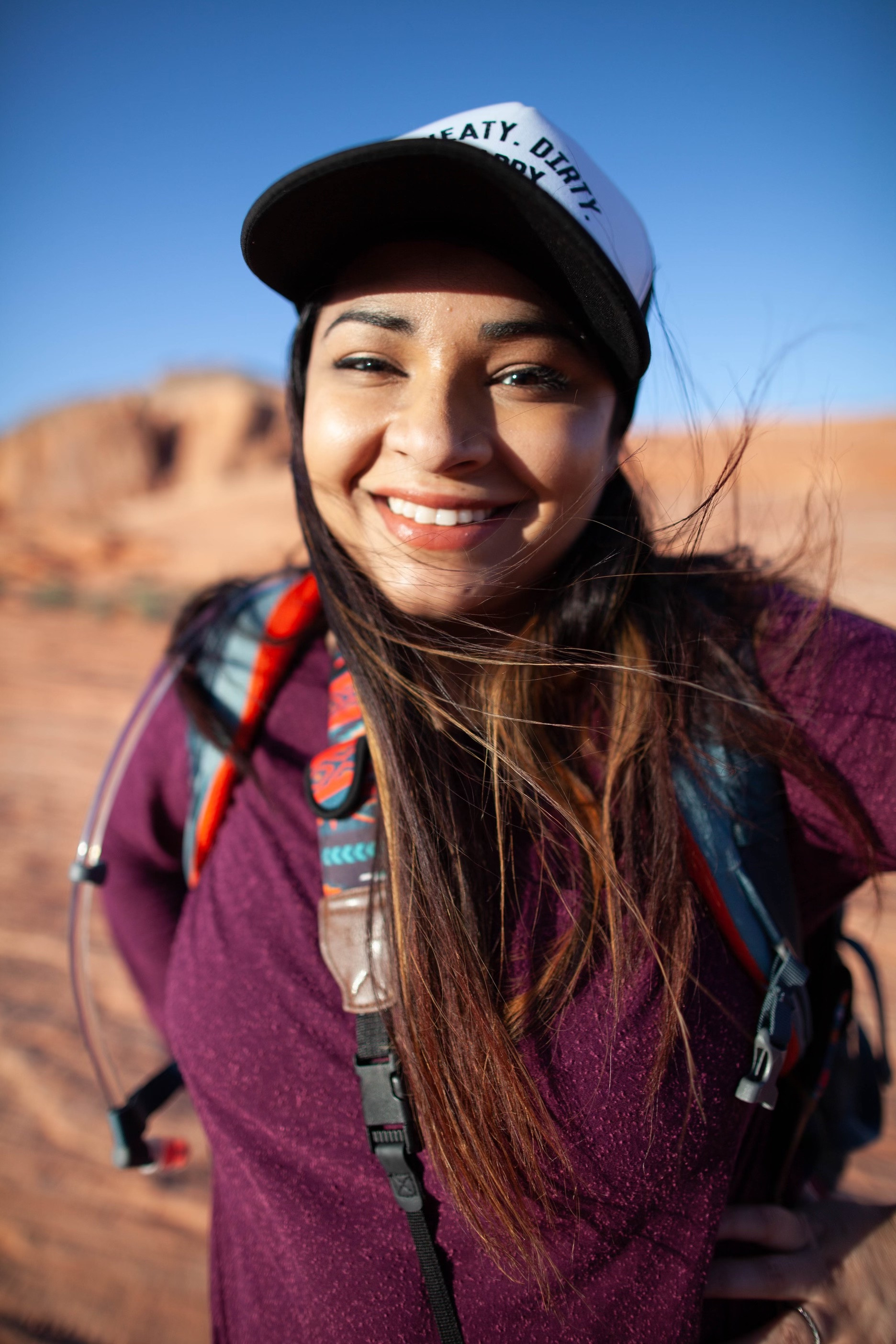
Ambreen Tariq

- Robert Tallon (1932–2015), The Thing in Dolores' Piano (1970)
- Rajesh Talwar (born 1958) – The Three Greens
- Shaun Tan (born 1974) – The Red Tree, The Lost Thing, Tales from Outer Suburbia, Rules of Summer
- Kathryn Tanquary – The Night Parade
- Ambreen Tariq – Fatima's Great Outdoors
- Ann Taylor (1782–1866) and Jane Taylor (1783–1824) – Rhymes for the Nursery, Original Poems for Infant Minds, Little Ann and Other Poems
- Angeline Teal (1842–1913) – John Thorn's Folks
- Dorota Terakowska (1938–2004) – Córka czarownicy
- K. Thayat (1927–2011) – Mela, Naivedyam
- Colin Thiele (1920–2006) – Storm Boy, Blue Fin, Sun on the Stubble
- Scarlett Thomas (born 1972) – Worldquake series
- Kate Thompson (born 1956) – Switchers, The New Policeman
- Ruth Plumly Thompson (1891–1976) – The Royal Book of Oz (1921) and twenty subsequent Oz books
- Thorarinn Leifsson (born 1966) – Father's Big Secret, Grandmother's Library
- James Thurber (1894–1961) – The Thirteen Clocks, The Wonderful O, Many Moons
- Tim Tingle (fl. 2002–2018) – Crossing Bok Chitto: A Choctaw Tale of Friendship and Freedom
- Eve Titus (1905–2002) – Basil of Baker Street series, Anatole series
- Ada Josephine Todd (1858–1904) – The Vacation Club
- Barbara Euphan Todd (1890–1976) – Worzel Gummidge series
- H. E. Todd (1908–1988) – Bobby Brewster series
- J. R. R. Tolkien (1892–1973) – The Hobbit, The Father Christmas Letters
- Aleksei Nikolaevich Tolstoy (1883–1945) – The Golden Key, or the Adventures of Buratino
- Leo Tolstoy (1828–1910) – Classic Tales and Fables for Children
- Theresa Tomlinson (born 1946) – The Forestwife, Meet Me by the Steelmen, The Moon Riders
- Hazel Townson (1928–2010) – The Deathwood Letters, The Speckled Panic, The Invisible Boy
- Catharine Parr Traill (1802–1899) – Canadian Crusoes
- Nigel Tranter (1909–2000) – Spaniard's Isle, Nestor the Monster
- P. L. Travers (1899–1986) – Mary Poppins series
- Mary Treadgold (1910–2005) – We Couldn't Leave Dinah
- Geoffrey Trease (1909–1998) – Cue for Treason, The Hills of Varna
- Henry Treece (1911–1966) – Horned Helmet, The Road to Miklagard, The Children's Crusade
- Sharon Tregenza (born 1951) – Tarantula Tide, The Shiver Stone
- Meriol Trevor (1919–2000) – Merlin's Ring, The Other Side of the Moon, The Rose Round, The King of the Castle, The Letzenstein Chronicles
- John R. Tunis (1889–1975) – Iron Duke, All American, Keystone Kids, The Kid from Tomkinsville
- Ann Turnbull (born 1943) – Pigeon Summer, The Sand Horse, No Shame, No Fear
- Ethel Turner (1872–1958) – Seven Little Australians
- Julian Tuwim (1894–1953) – "The Locomotive" and other poems for children,
- Mark Twain (1835–1910) – The Adventures of Tom Sawyer, The Adventures of Huckleberry Finn

== U ==
- Tomi Ungerer (1931–2019) – The Mellops series, Moon Man, Flix
- Florence Kate Upton (1873–1922) – The Adventures of Two Dutch Dolls and a Golliwogg
- Anne Ursu – The Cronus Chronicles
- Else Ury (1877–1943) – Nesthäkchen and Her Dolls, Nesthäkchen and the World War
- Eduard Uspensky (1937–2018) – Crocodile Gena and His Friends, Uncle Fedya, His Dog, and His Cat
- Alison Uttley (1884–1976) – Little Grey Rabbit series, A Traveller in Time

== V ==
- Rachel Vail (born 1966) – Wonder, Do-Over, The Friendship Ring series
- Jenny Valentine – Finding Violet Park, Broken Soup
- Chris Van Allsburg (born 1949) – Jumanji, The Polar Express, The Garden of Abdul Gasazi
- Wendelin Van Draanen (born 1965) – Sammy Keyes series, Flipped
- Hendrik Willem van Loon (1882–1944) – The Story of Mankind (nonfiction)
- Shreekumar Varma (born 1955) – The Royal Rebel
- Amy Cripps Vernon (1870–1956) – Gerald's Chum
- Heiki Vilep (born 1960) – The Sounds of Silence, The Monsters of the Closet Door
- Rene Villanueva (1954–2007) – Ang Unang Baboy Sa Langit (The First Pig In Heaven)
- Judith Viorst (born 1931) – Alexander and the Terrible, Horrible, No Good, Very Bad Day
- Elfrida Vipont (1902–1992) – The Lark in the Morn, The Lark on the Wing, The Elephant and the Bad Baby
- John Vornholt (born 1951) – The Troll King series
- Anne de Vries (1904–1964) – Journey Through the Night
- Seita Vuorela (1971–2015) – The School of Possibilities, Karikko

== W ==
Jacqueline Wilson

- Bernard Waber (1921–2013) – The House on East 88th Street
- Muriel Wace (1881–1968) – Moorland Mousie
- Jan Wahl (1931–2019) – Pleasant Fieldmouse, The Furious Flycycle, Humphrey's Bear
- Mats Wahl (1945–2025) – Winter Bay, Maj Darlin
- Lea Wait (1946–2019) – Stopping to Home, Wintering Well
- Judy Waite – Mouse, Look Out!
- Priscilla Wakefield (1751–1832) – The Juvenile Travellers: Containing the Remarks of A Family During a Tour Through the Principal States and Kingdoms of Europe
- Dorothy Wall (1894–1942) – Blinky Bill
- Ivy Wallace (1915–2006) – Pookie series, The Animal Shelf series
- Nancy Elizabeth Wallace (born 1948) – Snow
- John Graham Wallace (born 1966) – Mr Bumble
- Maria Elena Walsh (1930–2011) – Tutú Marambá
- Vivian Walsh – Olive, the Other Reindeer, Gluey, Penguin Dreams, Mr. Lunch series
- Mildred Pitts Walter (1922–2026) – Justin and the Best Biscuits in the World, Second Daughter: The Story of a Slave Girl
- Amy Catherine Walton (Mrs. O. F. Walton, 1849–1939) – Christie's Old Organ
- Jennifer Ward (born 1963) – Way Out in the Desert
- Elizabeth Watkin-Jones (1887–1966) – Plant y Mynachdy, Onesimus
- Victor Watson (born 1936) – Paradise Barn series
- Marion St John Webb (1888–1930) – Knock Three Times, The Girls of Chequertrees
- Regina Webb (born 1980) – Detective Henry Hopper series
- Sadie Rose Weilerstein (1894–1993) – The Adventures of K'tonton
- Ronald Welch (1909–1982) – The Gauntlet, Knight Crusader
- Elizabeth Foster Wesselhoeft (1840–1919) – Sparrow, the Tramp
- Jacqueline West (born 1979) – Dreamers Often Lie, The Books of Elsewhere
- Robert Westall (1929–1993) – The Machine Gunners, Fathom Five, The Scarecrows
- Frank Atha Westbury (1838–1901) – Australian Fairy Tales
- Scott Westerfeld (born 1963) – Midnighters trilogy, Peeps, The Last Days, Uglies series
- John F. C. Westerman (1901–1991) – John Wentley Takes Charge, The Invisible Plane
- Percy F. Westerman (1876–1959) – All Hands to the Boats, Deeds of Pluck and Daring in the Great War
- Carol Weston (born 1956) – Melanie Martin series, Ava and Pip
- Michael Wexler – The Seems series
- Suzanne Weyn (born 1955) – The Bar Code Tattoo, Mr. Magorium's Wonder Emporium
- Gloria Whelan (born 1923) – Homeless Bird, Angel on the Square, Listening for Lions, Chu Ju's House
- Evelyn Whitaker (1844–1929) – Laddie, Tip Cat
- E. B. White (1899–1985) – Charlotte's Web, Stuart Little, The Trumpet of the Swan
- T. H. White (1906–1964) – The Sword in the Stone, Mistress Masham's Repose
- Caroline Snowden Whitmarsh (1827-1898) - Violet, a Fairy Story, Daisy, or the Fairy Spectacles, Minnie, or the Little Woman. A Fairy Story
- Martin Widmark (born 1961) – The Whodunit Detective Agency series
- Kate Douglas Wiggin (1856–1923) – Rebecca of Sunnybrook Farm
- Oscar Wilde (1854–1900) – The Selfish Giant, The Happy Prince and Other Stories
- Laura Ingalls Wilder (1867–1957) – Little House on the Prairie and other Little House books
- Geoffrey Willans (1911–1958) – Down with Skool, How to Be Topp
- Barbara Willard (1909–1994) – The Iron Lily
- Mo Willems (born 1968) – Don't Let the Pigeon Drive the Bus!, Knuffle Bunny, Knuffle Bunny Too
- John Ellis Williams (1924–2008) – Owen the Goat of Snowdon
- Karen Lynn Williams (born 1952) – Galimoto
- Maiya Williams (born 1962) – The Golden Hour
- Margery Williams (1881–1944) – The Velveteen Rabbit, Poor Cecco, Winterbound
- Oneeka Williams (born 1966) – Dr. Dee Dee Dynamo series, Not Even the Sky Is the Limit
- Ursula Moray Williams (1911–2006) – Adventures of the Little Wooden Horse, Gobbolino the Witch's Cat
- Rita Williams-Garcia (born 1957) – One Crazy Summer, P.S. Be Eleven, Gone Crazy in Alabama
- Henry Williamson (1895–1977) – Tarka the Otter
- Budge Wilson (1927–2021) – Before Green Gables, The Leaving
- Jacqueline Wilson (born 1945) – Girls in Love, Double Act, The Story of Tracy Beaker, The Illustrated Mum
- Jane Wilson-Howarth (born 1954) – Himalayan Kidnap, Chasing the Tiger
- N. D. Wilson (born 1978) – Leepike Ridge, 100 Cupboards
- Arthur M. Winfield (Edward Stratemeyer pseudonym from 1899) – Rover Boys series
- Henry Winkler (born 1945) – Hank Zipzer series
- Henry Winterfeld (1901–1990) – Trouble at Timpetill, Detectives in Togas, Star Girl
- Elizabeth Winthrop (born 1948) – The Castle in the Attic
- P. G. Wodehouse (1881–1975) – The Pothunters, The White Feather, Mike
- Mary Wollstonecraft (1759–1797) – Original Stories from Real Life
- Audrey Wood (born 1948) – The Napping House, Moonflute, King Bidgood's in the Bathtub
- Patricia Wrede (born 1953) – Enchanted Forest Chronicles
- Dare Wright (1914–2001) – The Lonely Doll
- Patricia Wrightson (1921–2010) – The Crooked Snake, The Nargun and the Stars
- Eva-Lis Wuorio (1918–1988) – The Island of Fish in the Trees, The Happiness Flower
- Johann David Wyss (1743–1818) – The Swiss Family Robinson

== Y ==
Eugene Yelchin

- Kelly Yang – Front Desk
- Eugene Yelchin – Breaking Stalin's Nose, The Haunting of Falcon House
- Laurence Yep (born 1948) – The Golden Mountain Chronicles, Dragon series, Ribbons
- Jane Yolen (born 1939) – Owl Moon, Commander Toad series, Pit Dragon series, Wizard's Hall
- Charlotte Mary Yonge (1823–1901) – The Daisy Chain, The Little Duke, The Dove in the Eagle's Nest
- E. H. Young (1880–1949) – Caravan Island, River Holiday
- Ed Young (1931–2023) – Lon Po Po, Seven Blind Mice
- Miriam Young (1913–1974) – Miss Suzy, Jellybeans for Breakfast, A Witch's Garden

== Z ==
- Zheng Yuanjie (born 1955) – King of Fairy Tales
- Rania Zaghir (born 1977) – Who Ate My Ice Cream?
- Paul Zindel (1936–2003) – The Pigman
- Feenie Ziner (1921–2012) – Squanto, The Book of Time
- Charlotte Zolotow (1915–2013) – Mr. Rabbit and the Lovely Present

== See also ==
- Caldecott Medal
- Carnegie Medal
- Children's literature
- Fairy tale
- Newbery Medal
- Young adult literature
- List of children's book illustrators
- List of children's classic books
- List of children's non-fiction writers
- List of fairy tales
- List of young adult authors
- Lists of writers
