= Ekaterina Ivanova =

Ekaterina Ivanova is the name of:

- Ekaterina Ivanova (mountaineer) (1962-1994), Russian mountaineer
- Ekaterina Ivanova (biathlete) (born 1977), Belarusian biathlete
- Ekaterina Ivanova (tennis) (born 1987), Russian tennis player
- Ekaterina 'Katia' Ivanova (born 1988), Kazakhstan born British ex-girlfriend of Rolling Stone Ronnie Wood and contestant in Celebrity Big Brother 2010 (UK)
- Ekaterina 'Katya' Ivanova, a main character in Gloria Whelan's Russian Saga
