= The Calling of Saint Matthew (Pareja) =

1661 painting by Juan de Pareja

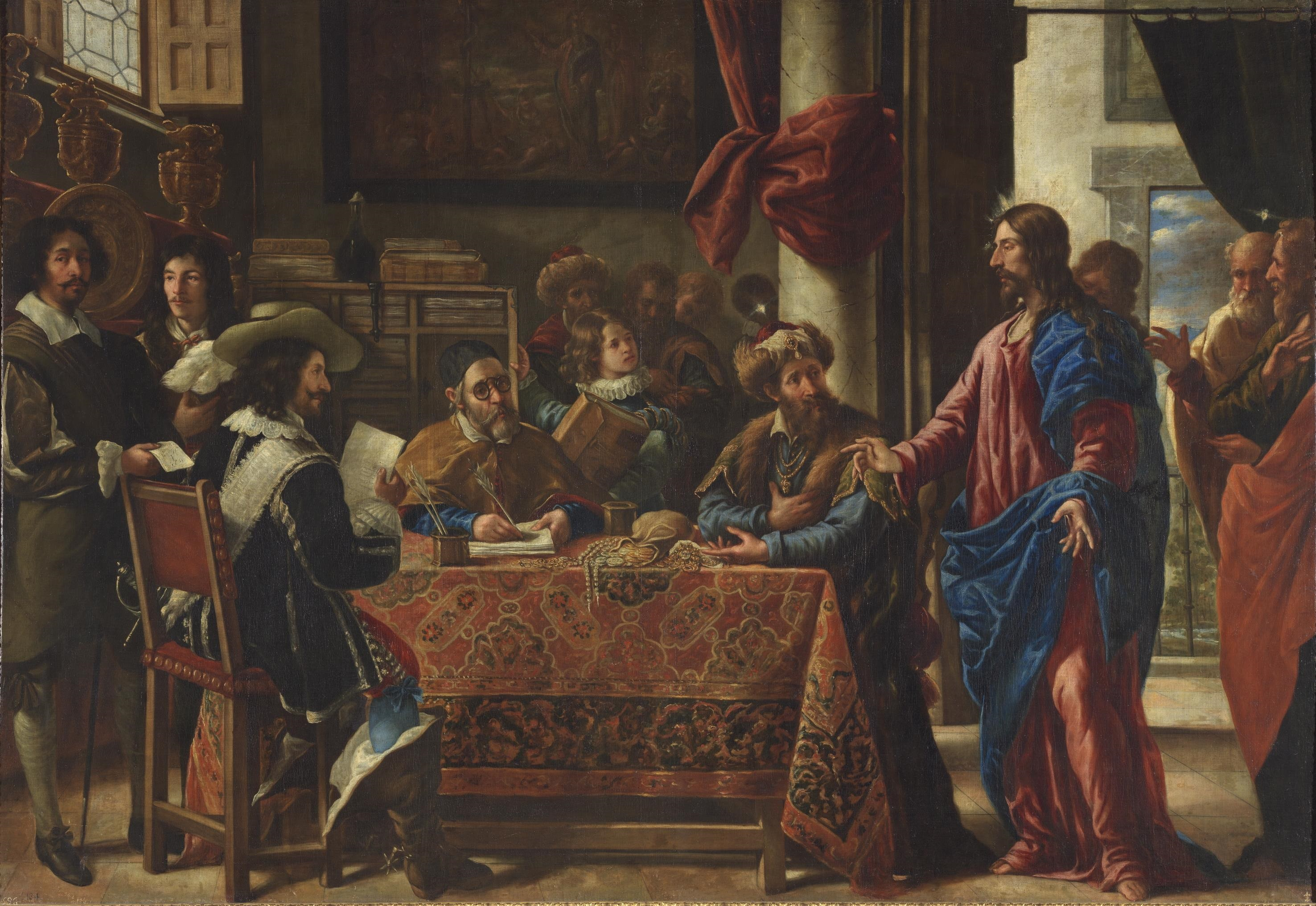
- Artist: Juan de Pareja
- Year: 1661

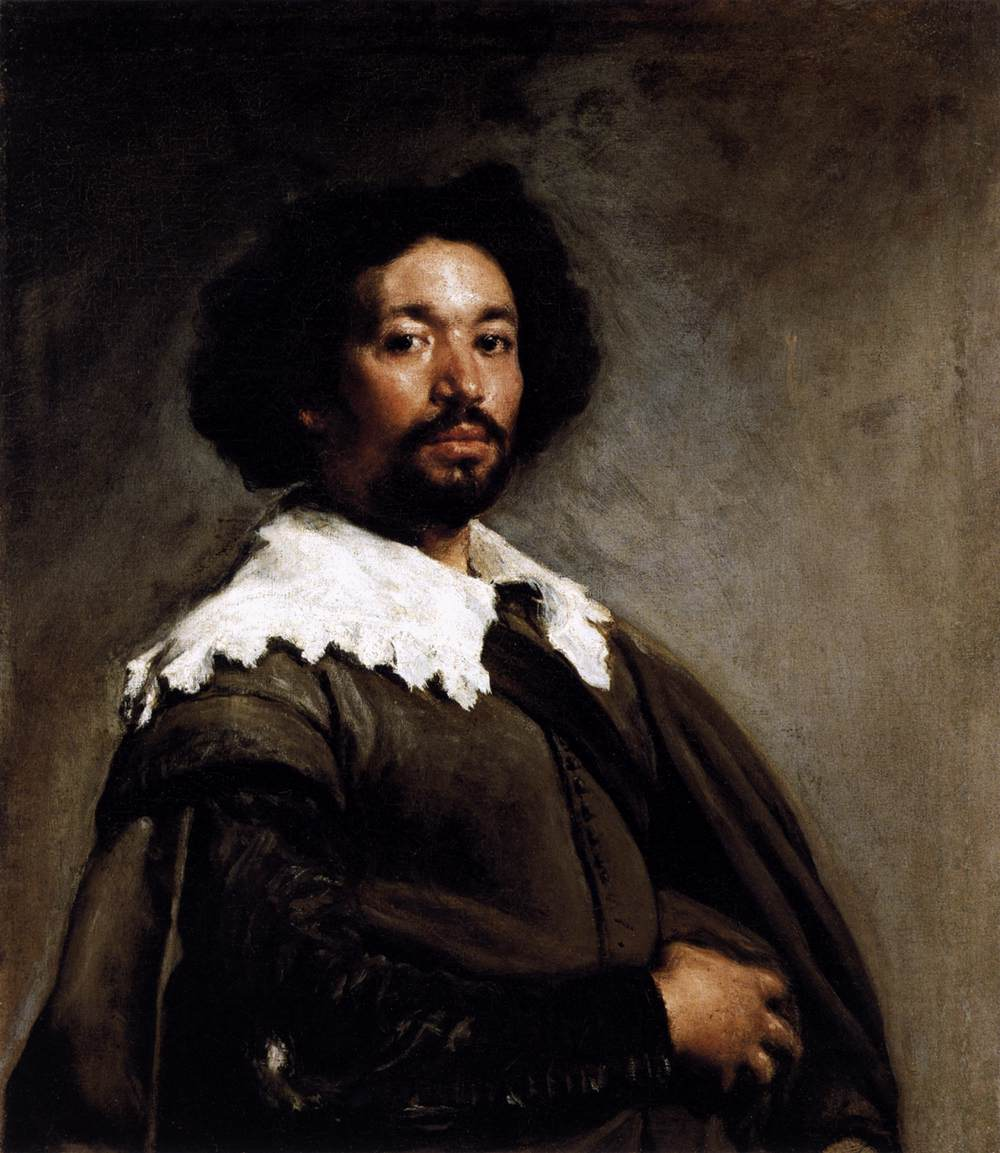
Diego Velázquez, Portrait of Juan de Pareja, 1650

The Calling of Saint Matthew is a 1661 oil painting on canvas by the Afro-Hispanic artist Juan de Pareja, former slave of Diego Velázquez. It is currently held by the Museo del Prado, in Madrid, Spain. The painting depicts the Biblical story in which Jesus calls Levi, a tax collector, to abandon his materialistic life and follow a spiritual path, transforming him into Matthew, a Gospel writer and disciple.The Calling of Saint Matthew had a profound impact on Pareja's legacy as a freedman and artist. The painting was likely inspired by the Caravaggio painting of the same subject.

== Description and interpretation ==
In Pareja's painting, Levi, depicted wearing luxurious attire and surrounded by symbols of wealth like coins and pearls, reacts with surprise before ultimately accepting Jesus’s call. The painting reflects themes of transformation and identity, both for Matthew and for Pareja, a Black artist asserting his position in 17th-century Catholic Spain. The composition divides the space into two contrasting realms—material and spiritual—separated by a marble column. On the right, Jesus and his disciples, barefoot and simply clothed, embody the spiritual realm. Jesus is distinguished by a white halo and divine light. On the left, the material world is characterized by opulent objects, busy tax officials, and lavishly dressed figures. Levi, positioned near the column, serves as the pivot between these two spheres, symbolizing his moment of conversion from the materialism that characterized the time and a religious life.

Among the figures on the left, Pareja incorporates a self-portrait, directly engaging the viewer and asserting authorship through an inscription on a piece of paper displaying his signed name and the painting's date. This inclusion of himself in the composition is likely a deliberate gesture influenced by Velázquez. Pareja is dressed as a nobleman holding a sword, a clear indicator of status. He also presents his facial features as more stereotypically European in comparison with Velázquez's portrait of him. The man directly behind him is likely Josè Antolínez, who was a part of Pareja's artistic network in Madrid, and with whom Pareja shared a close relationship.

On the wall, we see a painting of Moses and The Bronze Serpent. The scene usually symbolizes wavering faith, but here it may be meant to reference Moses as the leader of the enslaved out of Egypt.

=== Matthew ===
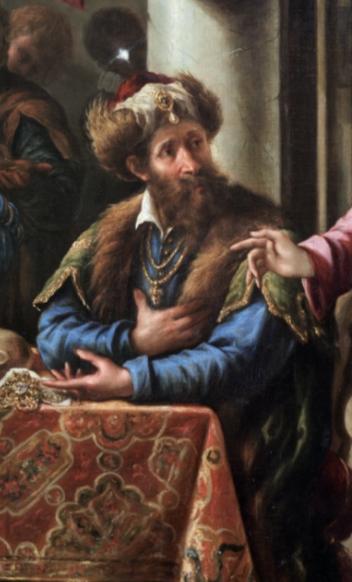
Detail showing St Matthew in The Calling of Saint Matthew

The scene takes place in Matthew's office where lavish jewelry, coins, and books shed light on his past life. Matthew, formerly known as Levi, was very unpopular amongst the Jewish community due to his occupation as a tax collector for the Romans. Upon his famous conversion to Christianity, he took on the name Matthew. He later became one of Jesus' twelve apostles and is traditionally believed to have preached in Ethiopia. Some scholars suggest that Juan de Pareja may have felt a connection with Matthew, as enslaved people in Spain were typically required to convert to Christianity, drawing a parallel between Matthew's transformation and Pareja's own experience. Identifying as a Christian was an important way of acquiring esteem in the eyes of white Europeans. Matthew was also the apostle of Ethiopia, which the Spanish considered to be the classical world and the first Christian nation. Pareja emphasizes that his identity, like Matthew’s, is rooted in Ethiopia, not in the dominant narrative of Habsburg Spain.

=== Pareja ===
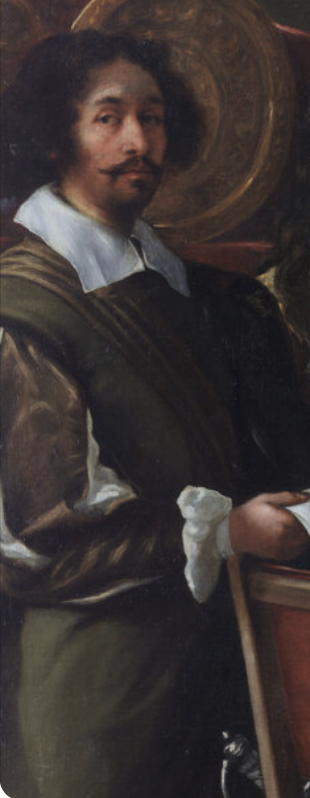
Detail showing Juan de Pareja in The Calling of Saint Matthew

In the painting, Pareja positions himself at the far left end of the table, a placement that subtly references his identity as a biblical Ethiopian and, more significantly, as a free man. Pareja created this painting only eleven years after his release from slavery, while still attempting to form an identity separate from Velázquez. The artist was eventually able to develop a career independent from his connection to Velázquez, but could not escape the comparisons.

At the same time, Pareja makes a clear effort to show that he is not an enslaved Black page in the composition. At the time of the painting, only free people were allowed to paint. Pareja took this into account and made his skin appear lighter so that viewers would see him as a freedman capable of painting. In addition, his facial appearance is uniquely European. He portrays one other Black figure in the painting above St Matthew and behind the column, as if to create a clear distinction between himself, a freedman, and the servant, likely enslaved. Pareja is also the only figure in the painting looking directly at the viewer. Just as Matthew’s conversion to Christianity marked a break from his former life as a publican, Pareja used his art to give birth to a new identity. However, in 17th-century Spain, where racial and social hierarchies were rigid, he had to frame this identity in a way that his audience would understand. In this particular time, society viewed the term "black" as a synonym for "slave."

=== Reevaluation of The Calling of Saint Matthew's legacy ===
For much of history, Juan de Pareja’s contributions to art were overlooked, and his identity as an artist was downplayed. However, interest in his previously neglected works has surged in the past decade, fueled by studies on Velázquez, particularly his portrait of Pareja, as well as the rise in transatlantic slavery studies. As a result, The Calling of Saint Matthew has often been viewed primarily through the lens of Pareja’s relationship with Velázquez, rather than as a masterpiece in its own right. Scholars now argue that this critical neglect stems from how Pareja's identity and role in art history were framed. To fully appreciate the significance of this painting, historians believe we must reconsider it within a broader cultural context, one that goes beyond traditional views and acknowledges Pareja as a key figure in 17th-century Spanish art.

=== Connections to other works ===
Juan de Pareja was primarily known for his portraiture and religious paintings. The Calling of Saint Matthew effectively combines Pareja's portrait skills with a Biblical scene. Pareja painted several other portraits, including Portrait of José Ratés and Portrait of a Capuchin Provincial. He also produced religious works typical of the Baroque period, such as Flight into Egypt (ca. 1658), and The Baptism of Christ, (ca. 1667).
