= Juan de Pareja =

Spanish painter

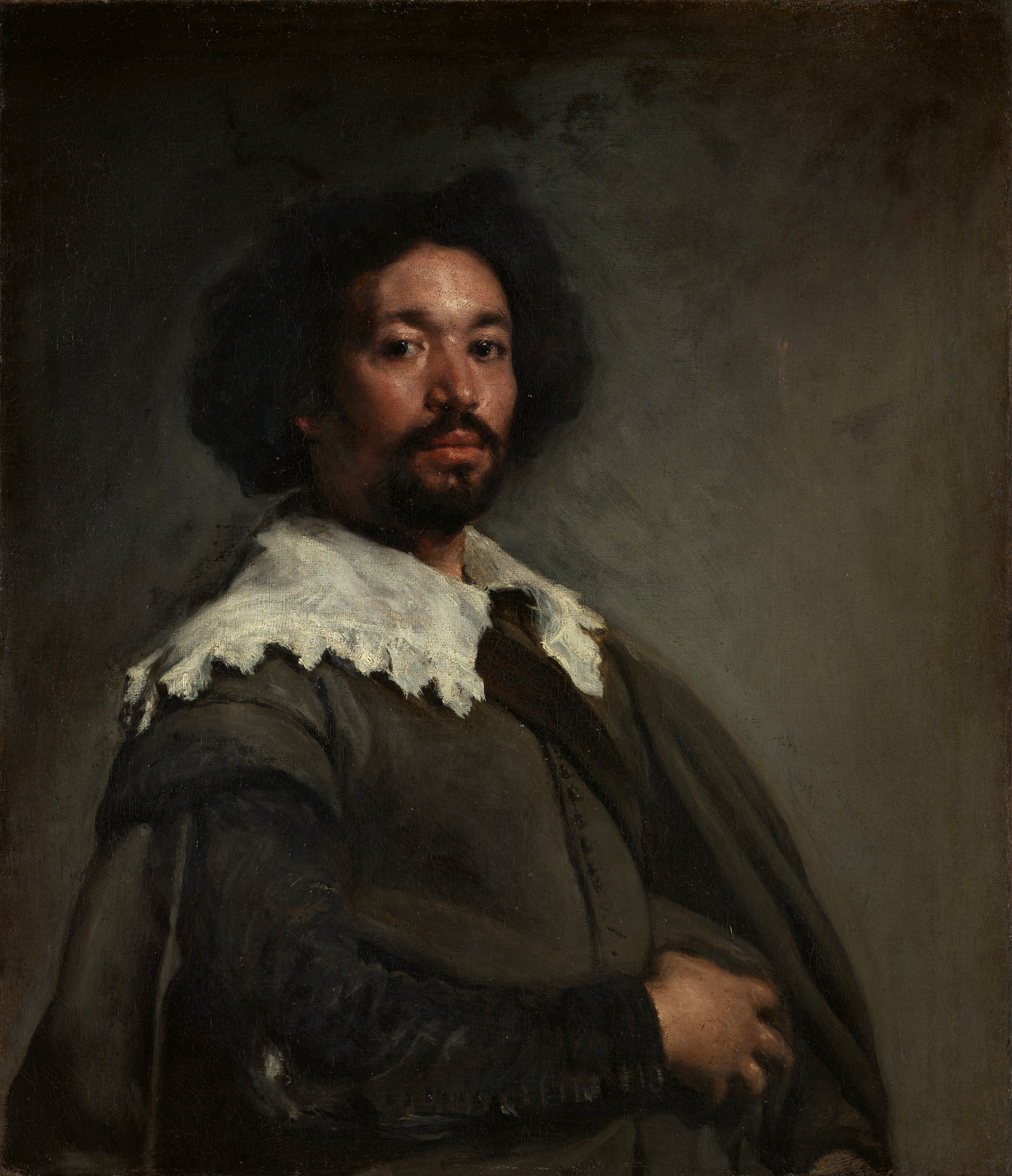
- Portrait of Juan de Pareja (c. 1650)
- Born: c. 1606; Antequera, Spain
- Died: 1670 (aged 63–64); Madrid, Spain
- Education: Diego Velázquez
- Known for: Painting
- Movement: Baroque

Juan de Pareja (c. 1606 – c. 1670) was a Spanish painter. Born enslaved, he is known primarily as a member of the household and workshop of painter Diego Velázquez, who freed him in 1650. His 1661 work The Calling of Saint Matthew (sometimes also referred to as The Vocation of Saint Matthew) is on display at the Museo del Prado in Madrid, Spain.

== Biography ==
Juan de Pareja was a Spaniard born into slavery in Southern Spain, probably in Antequera in Malaga province around 1610. Little is known on his background although Antonio Palomino describes him as being "of mixed parentage and unusual color."

The first known reference to Juan de Pareja as a painter is in a letter addressed to Pedro Galindo, attorney of the city of Seville, written on 12 May 1630, in which Juan de Pareja requests permission to move to Madrid in order to continue his studies together with his brother Jusepe. The authenticity of this document is questioned since within it he claims to be a free man and does not once mention Velázquez.

It is unknown at what time he began serving Diego Velázquez. In 1642 he signed as a witness in a power of attorney for Velázquez in a lawsuit against scribes in the criminal court. He was also a witness in October and December 1647, for two other powers of attorney to manage his assets in Seville granted by Velázquez and his wife Juana Pacheco. He would again sign a similar document in 1653 for Francisca Velázquez, daughter of the painter.

In 1649 he accompanied Velázquez on his second trip to Italy. This is where Velázquez painted his famous painting Portrait of Juan de Pareja, currently in the Metropolitan Museum of Art of New York. The painting was exhibited in the Pantheon of Rome in March 1650 during the festivities in honor of the Patron of the Virtuosos of the Pantheon, which Velázquez had recently joined. On 23 November, while still in Rome, Velázquez granted him a letter of freedom, which would come into effect after four years on the condition that he did not escape or commit any criminal act in that period. The document of his manumission, discovered by Jennifer Montagu, is held in the Archivio di Stato in Rome.

From then on until his death in Madrid he worked as an independent painter, demonstrating knowledge acquired in Velazquez's workshop, where he likely had wider responsibilities than Palomino suggests, as well as his knowledge of various other Spanish and Italian painters.

== In fiction ==
- In 1965, Elizabeth Borton de Treviño published a fictionalized autobiography entitled I, Juan de Pareja, that presents imagined details into the lives of both painters.

== Works ==
- Portrait of Agustín Moreto (1648–53), oil on canvas, Lazaro Galdiano Foundation, Madrid, Spain
- Portrait of a Monk (1651), oil on canvas, Hermitage Museum, Saint Petersburg, Russia
- The Flight into Egypt (1658), John and Mable Ringling Museum of Art, Sarasota, Florida
- The Calling of Saint Matthew (also known as The Vocation of Saint Matthew) (1661), oil on canvas, Museo del Prado, Madrid, Spain
- Saints John the Evangelist and Orontius, Augustine Collection, Madrid, Spain
- The Lady of Guadalupe, Augustine Collection, Madrid, Spain
- Portrait of the Architect José Ratés Dalmau, oil on canvas (116 × 97 cm), Museu de Belles Arts de València, Spain
- Portrait of Philip IV, King of Spain (c. 1656), oil on canvas, Columbia Museum of Art, United States
- El bautismo de Cristo (1667), Museo de Huesca/Museo del Prado, Huesca, Spain
- Dog with a Candle and Lilies (c. 1660s), oil on canvas, Indianapolis Museum of Art, United States

=== Works depicting Pareja ===
- Portrait of Juan de Pareja (1648), by Diego Velázquez, Metropolitan Museum of Art, United States
- Portrait of Juan de Pareja, the Assistant to Velázquez (1960), by Salvador Dalí, Minneapolis Institute of Arts, United States
- The Calling of Saint Matthew by Juan de Pareja, who painted himself as the leftmost figure (1661), oil on canvas, Museo del Prado, Madrid, Spain

== Gallery ==
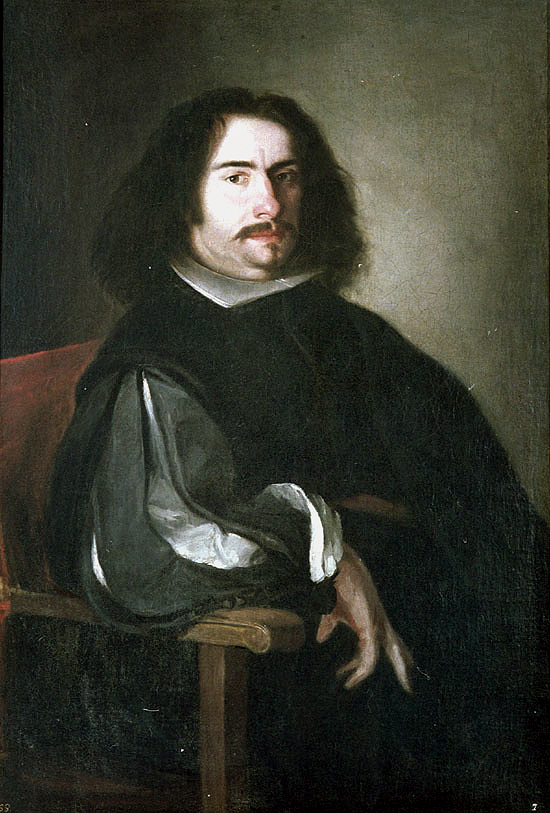
Portrait of Agustín Moreto, (c.1648-53), 102 x 69 cm, Museum of Lázaro Galdiano. The subject and the authorship are controversial.

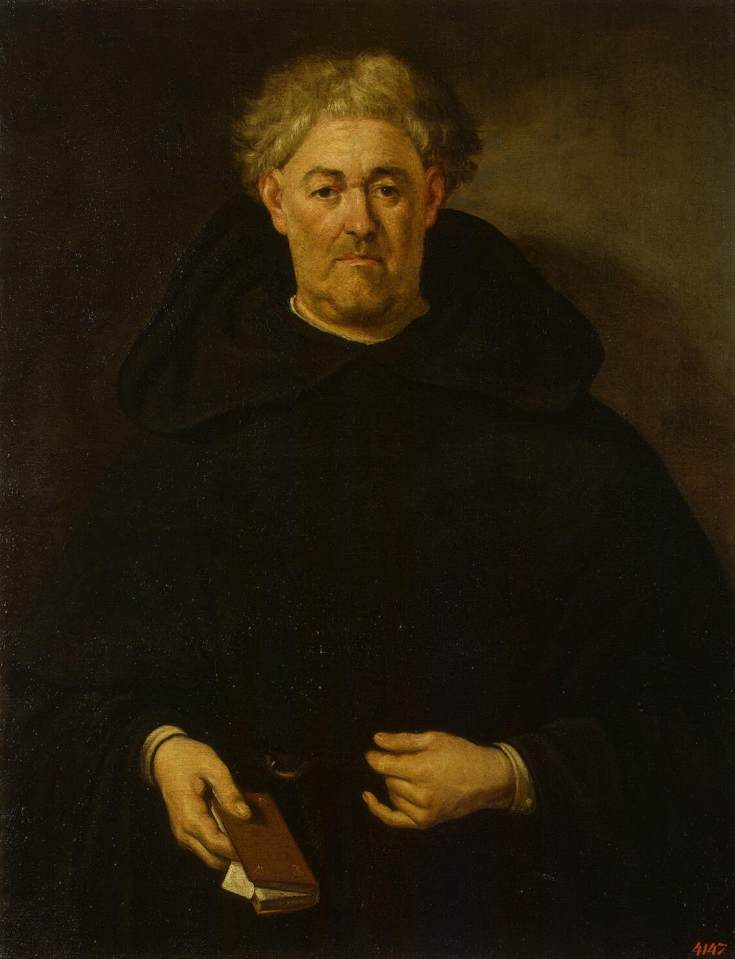
Portrait of a Monk (1651), 92 x 77 cm, Hermitage Museum

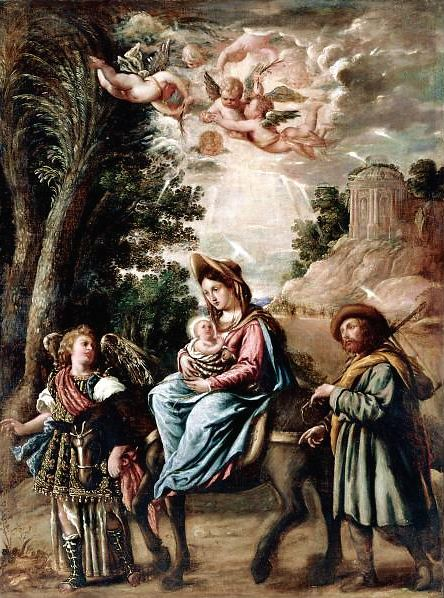
The Flight into Egypt, (1658), 168.9 x 125.4 cm, John and Mable Ringling Museum of Art, Sarasota, Florida

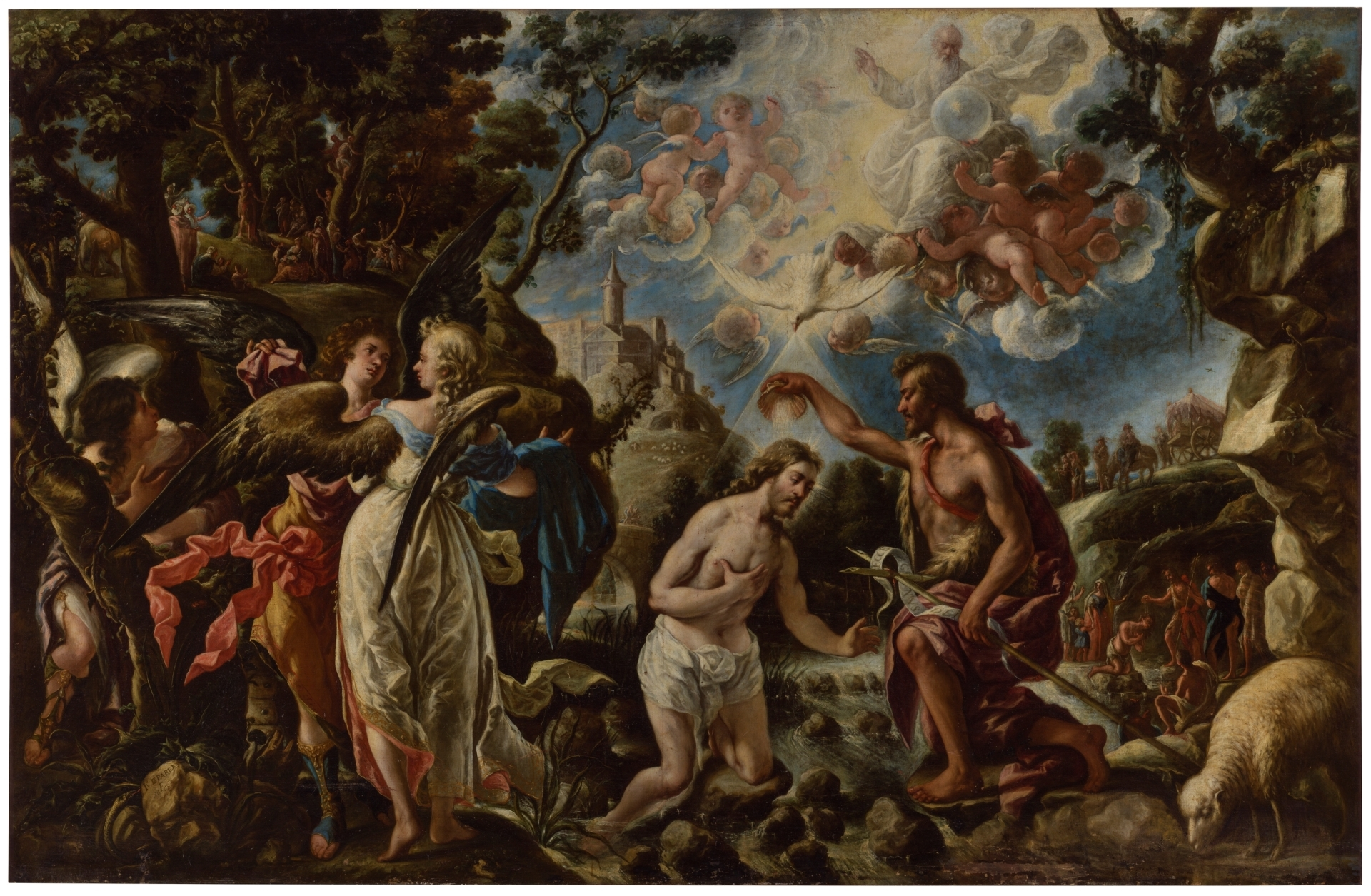
El bautismo de Cristo, (1667) 230 x 356 cm, Museo de Huesca/Museo del Prado

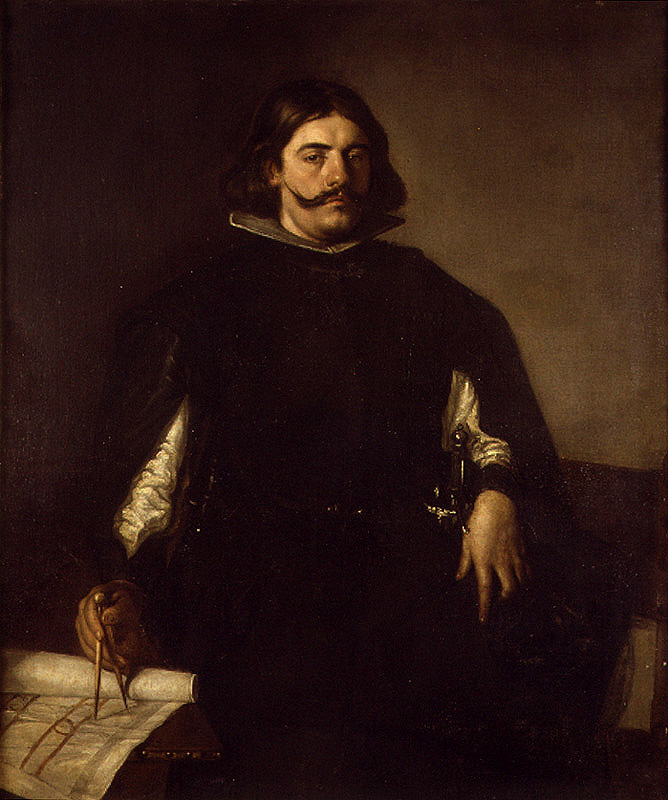
Portrait of José Ratés Dalmau, (c.1660), 116.9 x 97.8 cm, Museo de Bellas Artes, Valencia.

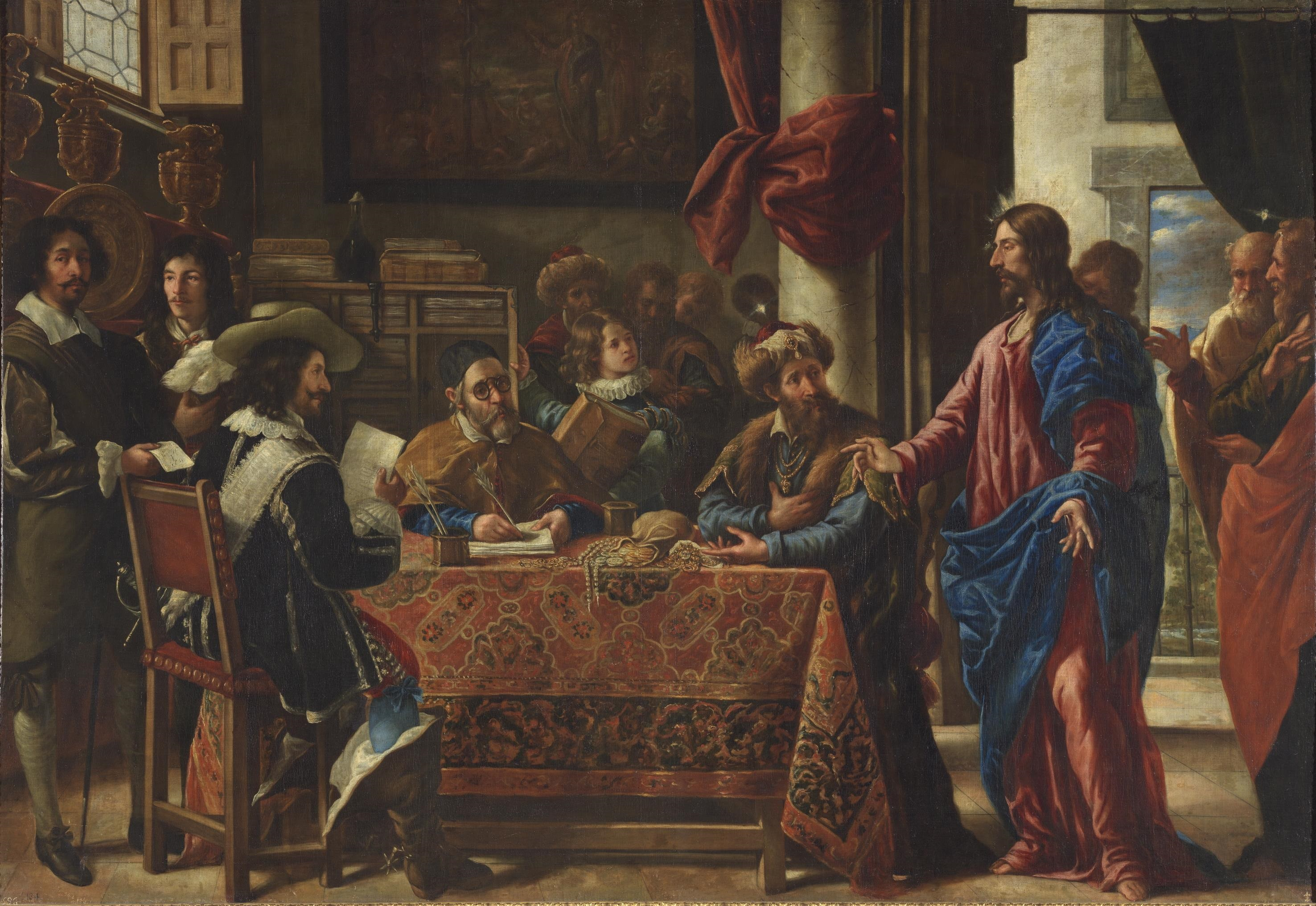
The Calling of Saint Matthew, (1661), 225 x 325 cm, Prado Museum. Pareja paints himself at the left.

== See also ==
- Representation of slavery in European art
- List of slaves

== Sources ==
- Corpus velazqueño. Documentos y textos, 2 vols. J. M. Pita Andrade. 2000.
- Hoving, Thomas (1993). Making the Mummies Dance. Simon and Schuster.
- Palomino, Antonio (1724). El Museo pictórico y escala óptica.
- Borton de Treviño, Elizabeth (1965). I, Juan de Pareja. Bell Books. ASIN B0006BN0A0. (Juvenile novel.)
