= Portrait of Juan de Pareja =

Painting by Diego Velázquez

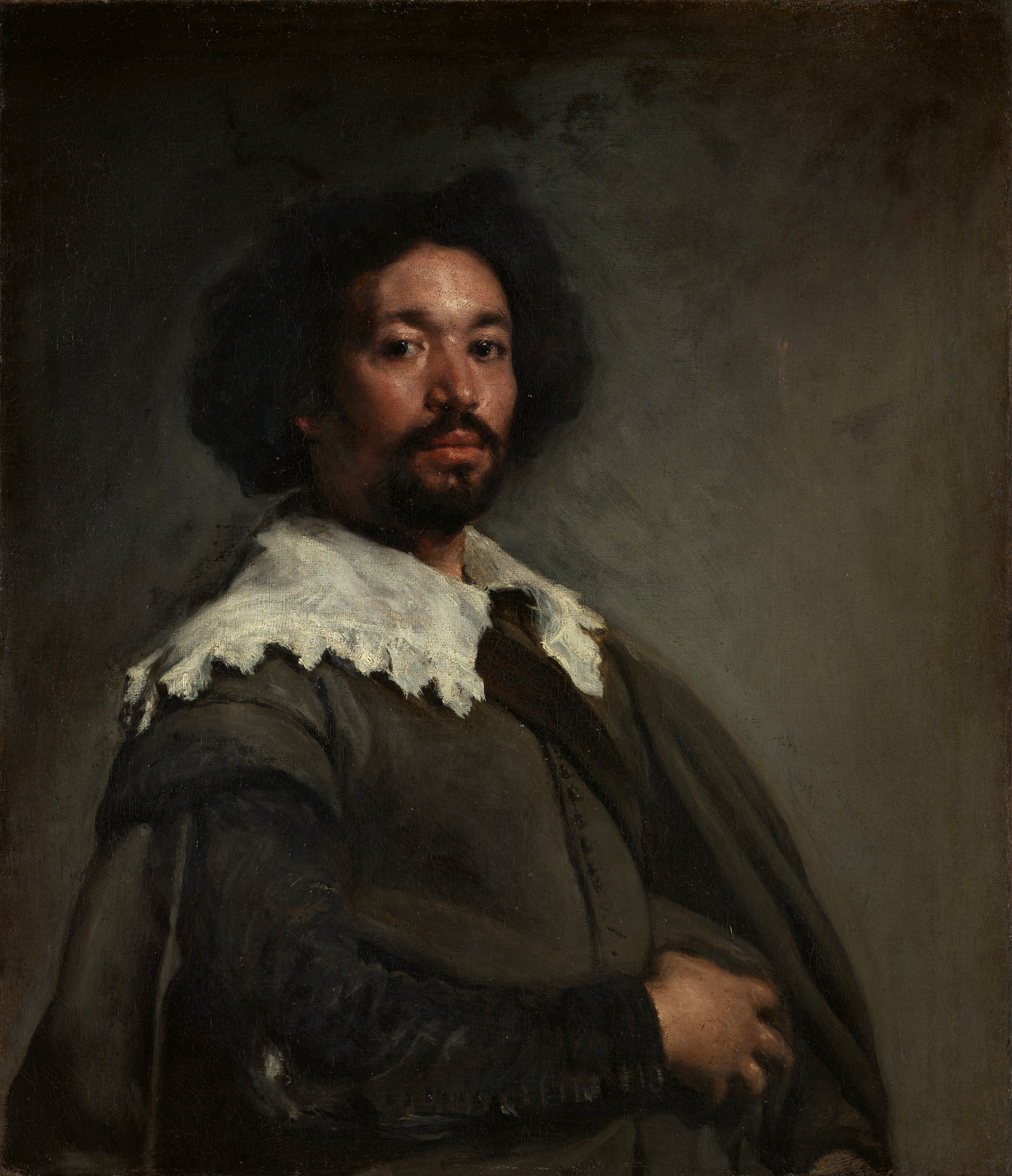
- Artist: Diego Velázquez
- Year: c. 1650
- Medium: Oil on canvas
- Dimensions: 81.3 cm × 69.9 cm (32.0 in × 27.5 in)
- Location: Metropolitan Museum of Art, New York City

The Portrait of Juan de Pareja is a painting by Spanish artist Diego Velázquez of the enslaved Juan de Pareja, a notable painter in his own right, who was owned by Velázquez at the time the painting was completed. Velázquez painted the portrait in Rome, while traveling in Italy, in 1650. It is the earliest known portrait of a Spanish man of moorish descent.

It was the first painting to sell for more than £1,000,000. At the time of the painting's purchase by the Metropolitan Museum of Art in 1970 they considered it "among the most important acquisitions in the Museum's history". The painting is on display in the museum’s main building on Fifth Avenue in New York City.

== History ==
In 1649, as court painter to Philip IV of Spain, Diego Velázquez was sent to Rome to purchase works of art for the Alcázar in Madrid. Velázquez brought with him Juan de Pareja, an enslaved man, who served as an assistant in the artist's workshop. During his stay in Rome, Velázquez executed an oil painting of Juan de Pareja, which was displayed as part of a larger exhibition of paintings at the Pantheon on 19 March 1650. According to Antonio Palomino's biography of Velázquez, the painting "was generally applauded by all the painters from different countries, who said that the other pictures in the show were art but this one alone was 'truth'."

Velázquez painted the portrait of Juan de Pareja, who was a Morisco from the city of Antequera in southern Spain, in his workshop, as an exercise in preparation for his official portrait of Pope Innocent X. The Pope, a ruddy-faced man who would be depicted in the bright pink and crimson robes of his office, presented a tricky study in both color and composition. Additionally, since he would be executing a portrait from life, Velázquez would be forced to work quickly while still capturing the essence of Innocent X's character. The Portrait of Juan de Pareja reflects Velázquez's exploration of the difficulties he would encounter in the Pope's portrait. To compensate for a restricted palette of colors, Velázquez adopted a loose, almost impressionistic style of brushwork to bring an intense vitality to his subject.

Juan de Pareja (circa 1610 – 1670) became an artist in his own right, and in 1654 he was freed by Velázquez.

== Provenance and copies ==
The painting's ownership between its first exhibition at the Pantheon in Rome in 1650 and the end of the eighteenth century is unknown. There is no record of the painting in Spain. The earliest record of the ownership of the painting was in essay written in 1765 by Francisco Preciado, Director of the Royal Spanish Academy in Rome. He stated the painting was owned by Cardinal Troiano Acquaviva d'Aragona (1696–1747) who lived in Rome.

The painting then reappears in the record as part of the dukes of Baranello's collection in Naples sometime in the 1700s. It was recorded as part of the collection of Sir William Hamilton, the British Ambassador to the Kingdom of Naples from 1764 to 1798. The inventory of his residence in Naples, Palazzo Sessa, lists "a portrait of a Moresco slave by Velazquez." Hamilton sent the portrait and his other works of art to London for safekeeping, on board the ship HMS Fondroyant the flagship of Lord Nelson, when he left Naples. Hamilton returned to England heavily in debt and the portrait was auctioned at Christie's in 1801. The auction catalogue listed the painting as Velazquez's "Portrait of a Moorish Slave, that was in his service, and became a great Painter". It sold for 39 guineas and disappeared from the record again.

It later surfaces in the collection of Jacob Pleydell-Bouverie, 2nd Earl of Radnor at Longford Castle, Salisbury. In a catalogue of the Radnor family's collection, published in 1909, stated that the portrait was part of the collection by 1814 and may have been acquired in 1811. It remained in the ownership of the Radnor family for over 150 years until it was sold at Christie's in London for the record sum of £2,310,000 (or 2,200,000 guineas or $5,544,000 (approximately $44,450,000 in February 2025)) on 27 November 1970. It was the first painting to sell for more than a £1,000,000, setting a new record for the price of a painting sold at auction.

Alec Wildenstein of Wildenstein & Company bid for the painting acting on behalf of the Metropolitan Museum of Art. The painting was acquired by the museum in 1971, principally through the Fletcher Fund, with an understanding the two million dollars would be paid back over time with income generated from the Rogers Fund, Fletcher Fund and other "restricted to buying funds". The painting is considered one of the "most important acquisitions in the Museum's history". Theodore Rousseau, when Curator-in-Chief of the museum, stated that the painting was "one of the finest works of art to come on the market in our time."

The finest and best-known copy belongs to the Hispanic Society of America, New York. The Hispanic Society's copy is believed to have been painted from the original while it was in the collection of the earl of Radnor at Longford Castle.

== Legacy and influence ==
The portrait inspired the 1965 novel I, Juan de Pareja by Elizabeth Borton de Treviño. The novel was awarded the children's literary prize the Newbery Medal in 1966.

Velazquez's painting reinterpreted by surrealist painter Salvador Dalí in his 1960 work Portrait of Juan de Pareja, the Assistant to Velázquez which is in the collection of the Minneapolis Institute of Art. French-Senegalese artist Iba N'Diaye restaged the Velazquez portrait in his 1985–86 painting Juan de Pareja agressé par les chiens (Juan de Pareja menaced by dogs).

In 2000, in his painting Juan Pareja revisiting Picasso Meninas (Velazquez), the Peruvian painter Herman Braun-Vega, for whom mixed race is a recurring theme, places a brush and palette in the hands of Velázquez's mixed-race slave. In doing so, he pays a nod to Juan de Pareja, who, as a slave, could only paint in secret. In his painting, however, Braun-Vega depicts Juan de Pareja painting a version inspired by Picasso's Cubist studies of Velázquez's Las Meninas. Braun-Vega thus pays a triple homage to the painters Juan de Pareja, Velázquez, and Picasso.

A central theme of the 2012 play Disgraced by Ayad Akhtar is a painting of the protagonist, a South Asian Muslim man, as painted by his white wife in the style of the Portrait of Juan de Pareja.

== See also ==
- List of works by Diego Velázquez
- Representation of slavery in European art
