= Karl Dewey Myers =

American poet (1899–1951)

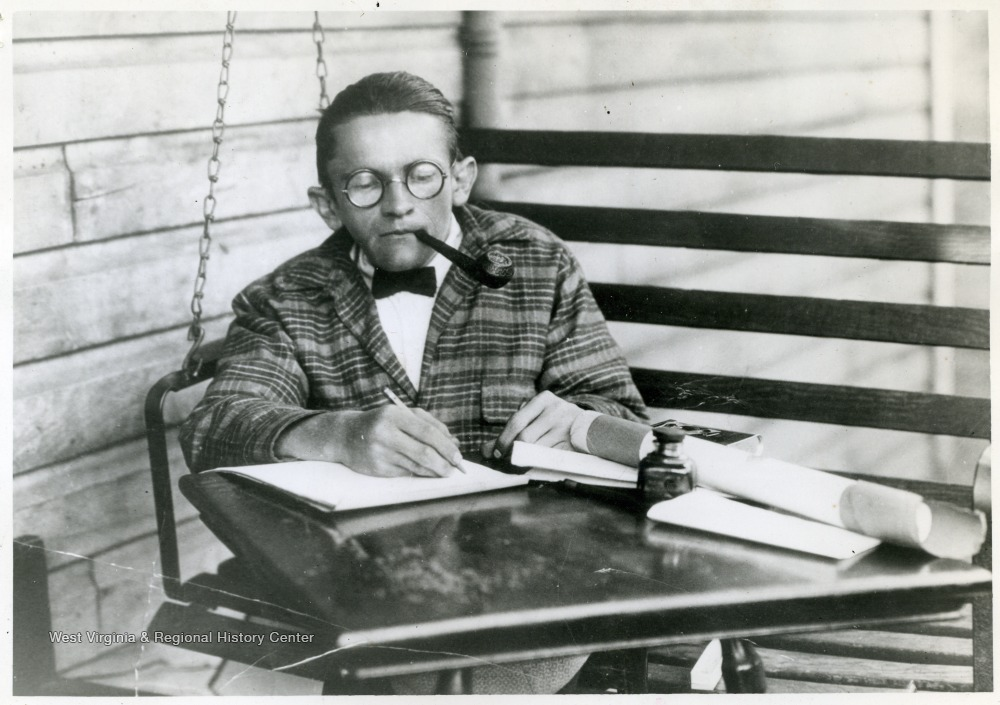
- Myers in 1927
- Born: 1899
- Died: 1951 (aged 51–52)
- Resting place: Odd Fellows Cemetery, Elkins, WV
- Writing career
- Language: English
- Genre: Poetry
- Notable work: The Quick Years (1926)
- Notable awards: West Virginia Poet Laureate

Karl Dewey Myers (1899–1951) was an American poet known during his lifetime for his portrayal of rural Appalachia. He was named the first state poet laureate of West Virginia in 1927, and published two poetry collections, The Quick Years (1926) and Cross and Crown (1951).

== Life and career ==
Karl Dewey Myers was born in February, 1899 in Tucker County, West Virginia. The youngest of 7 children, his parents were Mary C. Philips (1857–1923) and Benjamin Franklin Myers (1854–1932). Myers was physically disabled, but the exact nature of his disability is not well documented. Within his life, he never weighed more than sixty pounds and never walked, and he relied on a special typewriter due to his difficulty with typing on a traditional model. Due to his disabilities, he was denied access to formal education and was almost entirely self-taught.

Myers first started writing seriously at age 16. He took inspiration from Elizabethan poetry and Edgar Allan Poe, in particular, but his early work was met with rejection. Myers eventually found publication in various magazines and newspapers, including the West Virginia Review, a publication for which Myers would later serve as an assistant editor.

In 1927, Governor Howard Mason Gore appointed Myers West Virginia's first state poet laureate. He served in this position from June 9, 1927, until March 10, 1937.

== Death ==
Myers died in 1951. He was buried in an unmarked grave in Odd Fellows Cemetery in Elkins, West Virginia. Although his grave was unknown, his family and friends later built a monument for him in the family gravesite in Tucker County.

== Work ==
Myers published two collections, The Quick Years (1926) and Cross and Crown (1951).

Very little is written about Cross and Crown, but The Quick Years exemplifies the variety of work he published. His topics ranged from scenic descriptions of the Appalachian Mountains and forests to local color writing, which is a style that emphasizes regional dialects and customs. For example, critic Walter Barnes argues in the introduction to The Quick Years that the section of poems titled "Some Folks I Know" adopts the "free-and-easy colloquialism" of the region. But Barnes also notes that poems such as “Juanita” draw on Victorian imagery, similar to Alfred, Lord Tennyson’s “Maud."

Journalist Jessie Wright-Mendoza suggests that Myers's disability is sometimes reflected in his writing, such as "The Apples of Hesperides":

Aflame with longing, parched with thirst,

Over the garden wall I bound.

O changeling youth! from birth accursed,

What is this fruit that I have found?

Life, could you give me naught but these,

The Apples of Hesperides?

Wright-Mendoza adopts a biographical reading of this poem, suggesting that Myers uses the mythical apples of Hesperides—which often symbolize knowledge—as a metaphor for the wisdom (and challenges) accrued after a difficult life. She continues, arguing that "he talks about how he was born and cursed from birth, yearning for love."
