= M. J. Engh =

American novelist (1933–2024)

- Born: Mary Jane Engh; January 26, 1933; McLeansboro, Illinois, U.S.
- Died: July 11, 2024 (aged 91); Garfield, Washington, U.S.
- Occupation: Writer
- Writing career
- Pen name: Jane Beauclerk
- Genres: Science fiction, history
- Notable work: Arslan
- Website: www.mjengh.com

Mary Jane Engh (born Mary Jane Gholson; January 26, 1933 – July 11, 2024), known as M. J. Engh, was an American science fiction author, librarian and independent Roman scholar.

Engh was born in McLeansboro, Illinois. Her first science fiction stories were published under the pseudonym "Jane Beauclerk". She is best known for her 1976 novel Arslan, about an invasion of the United States. Reviewer Algis Budrys called Arslan "a genuine work of speculative political science". Wheel of the Winds (1988), Engh's second science fiction novel, is about humans exploring a planet inhabited by humanoid creatures. Rainbow Man (1993) focuses on a woman who settles on an alien world and who must deal with its culture's rules about gender.

In 2009, Engh was named Author Emerita by the Science Fiction and Fantasy Writers of America.

Engh died in Garfield, Washington on July 11, 2024, at the age of 91.

== Bibliography ==
- Arslan (Warner Books, 1976; Arbor House, 1987). Published in UK as A Wind from Bukhara (Grafton, 1989).
- The House in the Snow (Franklin Watts/Orchard, 1987). Illustrated by Leslie W. Bowman.
- Wheel of the Winds (Tor Books, 1988)
- Rainbow Man (Tor Books, 1993)
- In the Name of Heaven: 3000 Years of Religious Persecution (Prometheus Books, 2007)

== Awards and honors ==
- 1994: Longlisted for James Tiptree Jr Memorial Award for Rainbow Man
- 1994: Nominated for Prometheus Award for Rainbow Man
- 2009: Named Author Emerita by the Science Fiction and Fantasy Writers of America
