= Buckeye, West Virginia =

Unincorporated community in West Virginia, United States

- Unincorporated community
- Location within West Virginia Location within the United States
- Coordinates: 38°11′09″N 80°08′04″W
- Country: United States
- State: West Virginia
- County: Pocahontas
- Elevation: 2,110 ft (640 m)
- Time zone: UTC-5 (Eastern (EST))
  - Summer (DST): UTC-4 (EDT)
- ZIP code: 24924
- Area codes: 304 & 681
- GNIS feature ID: 1554019

Buckeye is an unincorporated community in Pocahontas County, West Virginia, United States. Buckeye is located along U.S. Route 219, 3.5 miles (5.6 km) southwest of Marlinton.

The community takes its name from nearby Buckeye Cove.

== Climate ==
The climate in this area has mild differences between highs and lows, and there is adequate rainfall year-round. According to the Köppen system, Buckeye has a marine west coast climate, abbreviated Cfb on climate maps. Buckeye holds the October record low of 3 °F or −16.1 °C for the state of West Virginia, recorded in 1962.

== Notable people ==
- Louise McNeill, seventh Poet Laureate of West Virginia
