= Leslie W. Bowman =

American painter and illustrator (born 1949)

- Born: 1949 (age 76–77)
- Occupations: Painter, Illustrator
- Website: http://www.lwbowman.com/

Leslie W. Bowman (born 1949) is an American painter and illustrator, known especially for her portraits.

== Early life and education ==
A native of New York City, Bowman was raised in Westport, Connecticut and studied illustration and photography at the Rhode Island School of Design, from which she graduated with a BFA in 1971. Early in the 1970s she moved to Minnesota, where she continues to live and teach.

== Career ==
In 1987 she illustrated The House in the Snow by M. J. Engh, which became her first work to be published; other books for which she provided illustrations include The Night the Bells Rang by Natalie Kinsey-Warnock and Night of the Full Moon by Gloria Whelan. Later in her career she turned to portraiture as her preferred medium.

Bowman has most notably depicted six members of the United States House of Representatives during her career, providing their official portraits in various roles for display in the United States Capitol. These include Collin Peterson, as chairman of the United States House Committee on Agriculture; Dave Camp, as chairman of the United States House Committee on Ways and Means; Jim Oberstar, as chairman of the United States House Committee on Transportation and Infrastructure; Sam Graves, as chairman of the United States House Committee on Small Business; Spencer Bachus, as chairman of the United States House Committee on Financial Services; and Paul Ryan, as chairman of the United States House Committee on the Budget. Other institutions which own examples of her work include the Minnesota Supreme Court, for which she has painted Rosalie Wahl, and the Johns Hopkins Medical Institutions; she has also depicted Minnesota Supreme Court justice Russell A. Anderson.

== Works ==
=== Illustrator ===
- M.J. Engh, The House in the Snow, Orchard Books (New York, NY), 1987.
- Elizabeth Borton de Treviño, El Güero: A True Adventure Story, Farrar, Straus & Giroux (New York, NY), 1989.
- Natalie Kinsey-Warnock, The Canada Geese Quilt, Cobblehill Books (New York, NY), 1989.
- Marc Harshman, Snow Company, Cobblehill Books (New York, NY), 1990.
- Natalie Kinsey-Warnock, The Night the Bells Rang, Cobblehill Books (New York, NY), 1991.
- Natalie Kinsey-Warnock, The Fiddler of the Northern Lights, Cobblehill Books (New York, NY), 1996.
- Debra Page, Orcas around Me: My Alaskan Summer, Albert Whitman (Morton Grove, IL), 1997.
- Marc Harshman, When the End of Summer Is Near, Cobblehill (New York, NY), 1999.
- Marc Harshman, Snow Company, Quarrier Press (Charleston, WV), 2002.

=== As Leslie Bowman ===
- Nancy Ruth Patterson, The Christmas Cup, Orchard Books (New York, NY), 1989.
- Marilyn Levinson, The Fourth-grade Four, Holt (New York, NY), 1989.
- Deborah Chandra, Balloons and Other Poems, Farrar, Straus & Giroux (New York, NY), 1990.
- Gloria Whelan, Hannah, Knopf (New York, NY), 1991.
- Dennis Haseley, Shadows, Farrar, Straus & Giroux (New York, NY), 1991.
- Gary Paulsen, A Christmas Sonata, Delacorte Press (New York, NY), 1992.
- Jeff Daniel Marion, Hello, Crow, Orchard Books (New York, NY), 1992.
- Gloria Whelan, Night of the Full Moon, Knopf (New York, NY), 1993.
- Dick King-Smith, The Cuckoo Child, Hyperion (New York, NY), 1993.
- Deborah Chandra, Rich Lizard, and Other Poems, Farrar, Straus & Giroux (New York, NY), 1993.
- Alice Ross and Kent Ross, The Copper Lady, Carolrhoda Books (Minneapolis, MN), 1997.
- Jane Buchanan, The Berry-picking Man, Farrar, Straus & Giroux (New York, NY), 2003.
- Kathleen McAlpin Blasi, A Name of Honor, Mondo (New York, NY), 2006.
- William Loizeaux, Wings, Farrar, Straus & Giroux (New York, NY), 2006.
