= Chu Ju's House =

Book by Gloria Whelan

- Author: Gloria Whelan
- Genre: Historical novel
- Publication date: January 2004
- Pages: 240

Chu Ju's House is a children's novel by Gloria Whelan. It was first published in 2004. This book is the story of a fourteen-year-old girl who lives in China.

== Plot summary ==
Chu Ju lives in China near the Gan River with her parents and her grandmother. When she is fourteen, her mother gets pregnant and her whole family hopes the baby will be a boy. At this time in China, the law states that each family may only have two children, and tradition says that each family must have a son. However, a baby girl is born, and so Chu Ju's father and grandmother both agree that the baby girl must be sent away to make room for a son, although Chu Ju's mother begs to be able to keep her baby. Chu Ju develops a love for her new sister, so she decides to make a sacrifice. Chu Ju runs away secretly. This way, her parents will only have one daughter, her new baby sister, Hua.

First, Chu Ju gets a job on a fishing boat cleaning fish and mending nets with the mother while the man and boys fish. After that, she gets a job working with silk worms at a silk farm, but she and the other girls who work there are treated horribly. Chu Ju eventually writes a letter in protest of their unfair treatment, since she is the only one who knows how to write (her parents paid for her schooling, even though girls didn't normally receive educations). The girls are treated somewhat better, but Chu Ju loses her job. Subsequently, Chu Ju meets a woman named Han Na and gets a job helping her with her rice paddies. Han Na comes to love Chu Ju as a daughter, so when she dies, Han Na leaves land for Chu Ju. Four years after she secretly left home, Chu Ju decides to go home to visit her family. Her parents are overjoyed to see her. Chu Ju is relieved to see that her little sister, Hua, is safe and was not sent away. Chu Ju's mother has also had another baby when she was away. She gave birth to another girl named Nu Hai, but this one is going to stay in their family, even if it means they will break tradition since, there will be no son in their family because of certain circumstances. After Chu Ju's visit with her family, Chu Ju goes back to her rice paddies determined to save up money to pay for her sisters' educations.

== Critical reception ==
Kirkus Reviews called this story "well-done and convincing," and Publishers Weekly, Starred Reviews said that "Chu Ju emerges as a heroine worthy of the rare and coveted rewards she ultimately receives."
