= Listening for Lions =

Book by Gloria Whelan

- Author: Gloria Whelan
- Audio read by: Bianca Amato
- Genre: Historical novel
- Publication date: 2005
- Pages: 208
- ISBN: 9780060581763

Listening for Lions is a children's novel by Gloria Whelan, first published in 2005. Set in 1919, it concerns an orphaned girl who becomes involved in an inheritance swindle.

== Plot summary ==
Rachel Sheridan is the only child of British missionaries working among the Kikuyu and Masai tribes of British East Africa (present-day Kenya). Her father is a doctor and her mother is a teacher. Life goes haywire as an influenza epidemic strikes when Rachel is 13, in 1919. Many die from the sickness, including her mother and father. The Pritchards, arrogant and extremely rich people who live nearby, bring their daughter Valerie to the hospital, but it is too late to save her. After Rachel's father dies, it appears the hospital will be closed, and she is taken in by the Pritchards. They persuade the reluctant Rachel to impersonate their daughter, sending her in Valerie's place to visit her dying grandfather in England, on the pretext that it will save his life.

Rachel considers telling people of the Pritchards' lies on the ship, but she soon arrives in England and begins to develop a close relationship with her "grandfather", who, like her, is very fond of birds. Just as things begin to get better, the Pritchards' unveil their new plot, to take the grandfather's property when he dies and secretly threaten to expose Rachel as an impostor if she refuses to comply. In scorn of his son, the grandfather sends them away, but his trusty solicitor, Mr. Grumbloch, gives Rachel his address and tells her to come in an emergency. Rachel comes within the day, and Grumbloch returns her to her grandfather. Rachel tells him the truth regarding her identity, which he and Grumbloch have already suspected.

Rachel is adopted by grandfather Pritchard and she attends school. He leaves his estate to an ornithological society and ensures that Rachel will be able to complete her education. Years later, she becomes a doctor and returns to Africa to work at her father's hospital.

== Critical reception ==
The audiobook recording of Listening for Lions received an Audie Award as well as AudioFile magazine's Earphones Award. AudioFile called the story "solid" and Bianca Amato's narration "stellar."
