= No Promises in the Wind =

Book by Irene Hunt

- First edition
- Author: Irene Hunt
- Language: English
- Genre: Historical novel
- Publisher: Follett
- Publication date: January 1970
- Publication place: United States
- Media type: Print (hardcover)
- ISBN: 0-695-40065-7

No Promises in the Wind (1970) is a historical novel by Irene Hunt. This novel takes place in 1932 during the Great Depression and deals with growing up during that time.

== Plot summary ==
Josh's main talent lies in the piano, having been taught by his mother. He and his friend Howie are praised by their teacher, Miss Crowne. However, tired of the continual ridicule and temper of his father, he decides to leave Chicago and find a living on his own. His mother, Mary, supports his decision against her will, realizing that Josh's conflicts with his father, Stefan, and their entire family's lack of food would eventually lead to deeper problems.

Howie convinces the reluctant Josh to bring his brother Joey along, which later turns out to be a good decision. With the hope that their musical talents can earn them a living, they set out. Howie brings his banjo, and Joey is a great singer. On the first day, Joey's singing combined with Howie's talented playing allows the trio to gain 78 cents. Josh realizes Joey's importance and no longer regrets bringing him along.

However, while trying to get to Nebraska by riding on a freight train, a tragedy falls upon the trio. Howie, while running alongside a train which the brothers had already boarded, is struck by a train coming from the opposite direction. Though quite grieved, Josh and Joey continue, even declining the hospitality of a kind man. The two manage to survive by begging, despite Josh's humiliation at doing such a thing. Finally, in a stroke of luck, the two receive the warmth of a woman who persuades Joey to write home to their mother. They also become acquainted with Lonnie Bromer, a truck driver. Lonnie lost a child named David who would be as old as Josh if he were alive. Lonnie brings the brothers to Baton Rouge, Louisiana. There, Josh and Joey receive a job at a carnival run by Pete Harris. Lonnie leaves the two with his address and they promise that they will write to him.

At the carnival, Josh befriends a dwarf named Edward C., who helps Josh by introducing him to the other carnival people. Josh takes a special interest in a clown named Emily. Josh finds Emily extremely attractive despite the differences in their ages; he is 15 years old and she is 30. Josh feels certain desires towards her and accompanies her whenever possible. Josh wants to buy Emily perfume for Christmas, but is convinced not to and instead gifts her silver coins with Joey and Edward C.. Pete Harris gifts Emily earrings, and Josh becomes very jealous. When he discovers that Emily is engaged to Pete Harris, he almost completely throws away any relations with her. They later reconcile.

Unfortunately, the carnival burns down, so Josh and Joey leave Baton Rouge with $18 Josh saved up and $2 that Pete Harris gives them. The pair ends up traveling with a bootlegger named Charley, who is transporting beer in his car. Charley gives Josh a $20 bill in exchange for his smaller bills. Josh passes a store that sells shoes and he goes in, planning to buy some overshoes for Joey. He tries to pay for the $1.50 shoes with the twenty dollar bill, but the shopkeeper takes all of it, instead of giving him the change.

Once the money is gone the two then resort to begging again. One of the women they meet at first refuses to help them, but then changes her mind out of guilt and invites the two to have soup. Joey repays her the next day by offering her half of a loaf of bread he had gained while begging.

Furious at Joey for giving away their hard-earned food, and hampered by his own sickness of pneumonia, Josh strikes Joey. Joey vows to leave him, and indeed does leave, taking along Howie's banjo. When Josh is unable to find him, he falls unconscious from the cold and sickness. He is discovered with Lonnie's contact information in his wallet. When Josh wakes up, he finds himself at Lonnie's home in Omaha, Nebraska. Josh discovers that Joey has not been found, and describes to Lonnie what happened.

Josh also meets Janey, Lonnie's niece. The two soon become fond of each other and fall in love. Josh finds renewed hope in the new president, Franklin Delano Roosevelt. Lonnie, worried about Joey and sends postcards to both Mary and Stefan, as well Emily. When Mary responds, Josh is surprised that Stefan is having sleepless nights over Josh and Joey. Joey is found after being described in a radio announcement and a happy reunion occurs. They find a new job working at a restaurant as a pianist and singer, and immediately become popular, despite Joey's occasional offtune singing.

Josh and Janey part ways, leaving sorrow in their hearts. Josh and Joey return to Chicago and back to their father, who, surprisingly, comes to meet them at the train station and breaks down into tears, after which Josh notices he and his dad share many things in common.

== Characters ==
Main Characters:

- Josh Grondowski, a 15-year-old boy, is the main character of this novel. He sets off from his family to find his own living after being angered by his father. He is accompanied by Joey, his brother, and Howie, his best friend. He can usually warm up to people. He is the type of person who will work for what he receives, very hard-working.
- Joey Grondowski, the 10-year-old younger brother of Josh, whose singing helped them to survive. He is usually very trusting.
- Howie, Josh's friend and a talented musician at the banjo, who is killed while trying to board a moving freight train. After he fell, they left him behind. He was always full of laughter, despite troubles with his alcoholic mother in Chicago.
- Stefan Grondowski, Josh's father, who starts at the beginning of the book as a man struck by the Great Depression and becomes extremely stressed and angry. Also the reason that Josh left home.
- Mary Grondowski, Josh's mother, who agrees with Josh's decision to leave Chicago.
- Kitty Grondowski, Josh's paternal half-sister (from his dad's first marriage), who struggles to locate a job in the beginning of the book.
- Lon (Lonnie) Bromer, a truck driver who takes care of Josh and Joey and is like a father figure to both of them. He also offers hospitality to Josh towards the end of the book and helps Josh to get a job in Baton Rouge at a circus and helped Josh get well after he caught a violent illness.
- Pete Harris, a man who employs Josh at the carnival he owns. He is to marry Josh's first love, Emily. Harris is Bessie's cousin. Not attractive, very stumpy, chubby and short.
- Edward C. Kensington, a dwarf man who befriends Josh. He is thoughtful, nice, polite and respectful. He helps out Emily with her children a lot.
- Emily, (Bongo); a clown at the carnival Josh falls in love with. She uses a male name when she is working. She has three boys and her husband died a while back. She's about to marry Pete Harris, which Josh is very upset about.
- Janey, Lonnie's tomboyish niece, who falls in love with Josh.
- Mrs. Arthur, who adopts Joey for a short time before Lonnie reunites Joey with Josh. She also helps to get Josh and Joey a job at a restaurant.
- Mr. Ericsson, who employs the two as entertainers at his restaurant.

A list of characters that mean a little less than others:

- Elizabeta, Stefan's deceased first wife (Kitty's mother).
- Ben and Josie, two poor farmers who help to cook a rooster and provide a meal for Josh and Joey.
- Betsy, a pretty girl who causes Josh to feel ashamed at his begging when he comes to her door for food.
- Bessie, a waitress who listens to Josh play the piano while they are headed for Louisiana. Bessie is also Pete Harris's cousin who helps Josh get a job at Pete's carnival.
- Florinda, an old dancer with "lumpy legs" who spreads gossip around the circus. She doesn't think about others feelings before she says anything. She is the most worried when the circus burns down. She gets upset when Josh calls her "Ma'am," saying it makes her feel old.
- Charley, a rich mobster, approximately 20 years old. Drives Josh and Joey towards Nebraska also in his Cadillac and treats the boys to dinner. He became rich from selling alcohol during the Prohibition.
- Alf, a poor owner of a shoe store where Josh purchases boots for Joey. Josh pays with a 20 dollar bill. When the man takes the bill he, threatening the boys not to call foul on him, keeps the bill without giving the boys change.
- Blegan, a dwarf who also made rude remarks. Has a reputation of being annoying. He talks about people behind their backs and is inconsiderate and selfish. He does not have many friends at the carnival and tends to fight with his (also fellow dwarf) wife often.
- Miss Crowne, Josh and Howie's music teacher, who believes they had great talent, and inspires them to use their talent.
