= Homeless Bird =

2000 young adult novel by Gloria Whelan

- Author: Gloria Whelan
- Language: English
- Publication date: 2000

Homeless Bird is a 2000 young adult novel by American author Gloria Whelan about a 13-year-old widow in the year 2000 in India. This book won the National Book Award for Young People's Literature in 2000.

The title comes from a poem by Rabindranath Tagore. Whelan did not visit India but read extensively about the country before she wrote the book. Her idea of the book came from a story on child widows and an exhibit on Asian embroidery in America.

== Plot summary ==
Koly is a 13-year-old girl who lives in India with her parents and two brothers. Based on Indian tradition, her family has made an arranged marriage for her. Her husband is a sickly, young boy named Hari, much unlike her cool best friend Zarif from back home. Once they are married, Koly must go to live with his family. But soon Koly finds out that Hari has tuberculosis and he will die very soon, and that the marriage was only allowed so that her dowry could be used to take Hari to the holy city Varanasi, and swim in the Ganges River out of the hope it would help him recover. However, it only worsens his condition, and Hari dies the next day. Koly's sassur (father-in-law) is a kind man who teaches students. He teaches Koly to read and shows her a book of poems signed by the author Tagore. Koly's sass (mother-in-law) is not a nice woman. She treats Koly as just another homeless bird to feed.

Koly's sister-in-law Chandra is soon married. Koly is sad because Chandra was her friend and now she is leaving. Soon Koly's sassur becomes depressed due to work changes and dies, and now both Koly and her sass are very poor widows. One day Sass gets a letter from her brother inviting them to live with him in Delhi. They make a stop in Vrindavan to pray at a temple. They take a rickshaw to the temple. Sass gives Koly money to buy lunch. Koly goes to buy the food but when she goes back to the temple her sass is not there. She looks around and cannot find her. Finally she sees the rickshaw driver, who tells her that Sass left for a train hours ago.

Koly sobs because her sass has left her. The rickshaw driver says to go to the temple and pray so the monks will give her food. Koly is very unhappy and scared. She sees the rickshaw driver again and he offers to bring her to a house for widows. At the home Koly meets a nice widow named Tanu. Together they find jobs making marigold garlands and beaded bracelets. However, Koly's talent is embroidery. She finally gets a job in embroidering. Her new boss' name is Mr. Das.

Koly also teaches the rickshaw driver, Raji, how to read. Raji owns a farm and drives rickshaws for money. They talk and become friends. However, he leaves to fix his farm. At her new job, Koly makes friends with a girl named Mala. Mala is good at embroidery but very outspoken, and even steals expensive cloths from Mr. Das for her own crafts. However, she's found out and loses her job.

Raji comes back and tells Koly that he is fixing up his farm and building a home. He wants Koly to come to his farm with him. She is confused until Raji says he wants her as his wife. Koly is surprised that Raji wants to marry her because she is a widow, and in her society, it is shameful to be a widow. However, Raji wants to marry Koly because he does not care about appearance and only wants someone he can talk to. Koly is still unsure but agrees to think about it.

Tanu and Koly finally have enough money to get their own apartment so that more widows can live in the house for widows. Koly decorates the room with embroidered quilts.

In the summer Raji writes that he has built a room for her work on her embroidery. Koly is happy and agrees to marry him. She works on a wedding quilt and says they will marry when she is done embroidering it. She keeps her job and agrees to take her work to Mr. Das every couple of weeks.

Koly, just like the homeless bird in one of the Tagore poems, has finally found her home.

== Reception ==
PankhuriD of The Guardian praised the novel's storyline and characterization but pointed out that "many of the customs she talks about appear fake and outdated" and that "in contemporary India, girls don't get married at 13". It was reviewed positively in Publishers Weekly, which also noted that "[t]he feminist theme that dominates the happily-ever-after ending seems more American than Indian". Morgan Freeman believed it was a novel of "the greatest expertise" and it was one of Freeman's main inspirations for his trip to Delhi Sub in Indian. Former NBA player Mario Chalmers has described this book in a 2017 interview as a "delectable feast of knowledge of the socio-economic state of the year 2000" and the "harsh reality of the Indian people around the globe" (sic)
