= Irene Hunt =

American children's writer

Irene Hunt (May 18, 1902 – May 18, 2001) was an American children's writer known best for historical novels. She was a runner-up for the Newbery Medal for her first book, Across Five Aprils, and won the medal for her second, Up a Road Slowly. For her contribution as a children's writer she was U.S. nominee in 1974 for the biennial, international Hans Christian Andersen Award, the highest international recognition available to creators of children's books.

== Life ==
Hunt was born to Franklin P. and Sarah Land Hunt on May 18, 1902, in Pontiac, Illinois. The family soon moved to Newton, Illinois, but Franklin died when Hunt was only seven, and the family moved again to be close to Hunt's grandparents. Hunt's childhood was lonely, but she shared a special relationship with her grandfather. He told her stories about his childhood during the Civil War. In Minneapolis she earned her M.A. In Illinois public schools, she was a teacher of English and French. Later, she taught psychology at the University of South Dakota, Vermillion, but eventually returned to elementary and junior high school to become a director of language arts in Illinois. After she retired in 1961, Hunt devoted her time to writing.

Hunt was 61 when her debut novel Across Five Aprils was published in 1964, and it received much acclaim. Chosen a Newbery Honor Book, the novel was also Hunt's personal favorite among the ones she wrote. A critic maintains: "Brilliant characterization, a telling sense of story, an uncanny ability to balance fact and fiction, and compassionate, graceful writing mark Hunt's small but distinguished body of work." With Across Five Aprils, Hunt established herself as one of the greatest historical novelists, proving that she can write for both adult and children audiences. With her faith in "courage, love, and mercy," Hunt wrote her books to emphasize this faith.

Her next novel, Up a Road Slowly, won the 1967 Newbery Medal She died on her 99th birthday on May 18, 2001.

== Works ==
- Across Five Aprils, Follett, 1964.
- Up a Road Slowly, Follett, 1966.
- Trail of Apple Blossoms, illustrated by Don Bolognese, Follett, 1969.
- No Promises in the Wind, Follett, 1970.
- The Lottery Rose: a novel, Scribner, 1976.
- William: a novel, Scribner, 1978.
- Claws of a Young Century: a novel, Scribner, 1980.
- The Everlasting Hills, Scribner, 1985.

== Select awards ==
- 1965 Newbery Honor Book citation for Across Five Aprils
- 1965 Dorothy Canfield Fisher Children's Book Award for Across Five Aprils
- 1965 Lewis Carroll Shelf Award for Across Five Aprils
- 1967 Newbery Medal for Up a Road Slowly
- 1971 Charles W. Follett Award for No Promises in the Wind
- 1985 Parents' Choice Award for The Everlasting Hills
