= Up a Road Slowly =

1966 novel by Irene Hunt

- Author: Irene Hunt
- Cover artist: Don Bolognese
- Language: English
- Publisher: Follett
- Publication date: 1966
- Publication place: United States
- Media type: Print (Hardcover and Paperback), Audiobook
- Pages: 192 (first edition hardcover)
- ISBN: 0695890093

Up a Road Slowly is a 1966 coming-of-age novel by American writer Irene Hunt, which won the Newbery Medal for excellence in American children's literature. This book is about a young child named Julie who grows from 7 to 17 years old with her aunt Cordelia and uncle Haskell in the country.

== Plot summary ==
When seven-year-old Julie's mother dies, she is sent to live with her Aunt Cordelia, an unmarried schoolteacher who lives in a large house several miles outside town. Her uncle Haskell lives in a converted carriage house behind the main house. Haskell is an alcoholic who, like his niece, aspires to be a writer (although he never produces a manuscript). Julie's brother Chris goes to boarding school, leaving her alone with Aunt Cordelia.

At first, grief-stricken Julie finds Aunt Cordelia stern and strict, but as she grows to young adulthood she comes to love her and to see her house as home. She becomes so attached to her that even when she has the chance to move back with her father, who remarries, she declines.

The story follows Julie from the age of seven to seventeen, from elementary school through her high-school graduation, and documents the ordinary events in a child's life: the cruelty of children, jealousy, schoolwork trouble, and first love. Julie also encounters problems in the lives of the adults around her, including alcoholism and mental illness (dementia).

== Reception ==
Kirkus Reviews said of Up a Road Slowly: "The author is adept at distinguishing the genuine from the spurious: Julie is a genuine character, and girls who go up the road with her will share in her growing up." In a retrospective essay about the Newbery Medal-winning books from 1966 to 1975, children's author John Rowe Townsend wrote, "Though not without faults, Julie seems at last just a little too good to be true, and so does the adult world in which she has won her place. That it is not our world is evident, and is not a just cause for complaint; but was the world ever quite like that?"

Awards
Preceded by I, Juan de Pareja	Newbery Medal recipient 1967	Succeeded by From the Mixed-Up Files of Mrs. Basil E. Frankweiler
