= Author Emeritus =

Author Emeritus was an honorary title annually bestowed by the Science Fiction and Fantasy Writers Association upon a living writer "as a way to recognize and appreciate senior writers in the genres of science fiction and fantasy who have made significant contributions to our field but who are no longer active or whose excellent work may no longer be as widely known as it once was". The Author Emeritus was invited to speak at the annual Nebula Awards banquet.

The Encyclopedia of Science Fiction describes the award as for "apparently, long-time sf writers not considered worthy of Grand Master eminence". The award was inaugurated in 1995 and conferred 14 times in the 16 years through 2010, with a final award being given in 2014. The award was termed "Author of Distinction" in 2004, and "Special Honoree" in 2014. The 2001 award was controversial as it went to a writer who was still active at the time.

An anthology, Architects of Dreams: The SFWA Author Emeritus Anthology, was published in 2003, collecting works of the first five honorees.

== Honorees ==
Author Emeritus honorees
Year	Honoree	Ref.
1995	Emil Petaja (1915–2000)	
1996	Wilson Tucker (1914–2006)	
1997	Judith Merril (1923–1997)	
1998	Nelson S. Bond (1908–2006)	
1999	William Tenn (1920–2010)	
2000	Daniel Keyes (1927–2014)	
2001	Robert Sheckley (1928–2005)	
2002	–	
2003	Katherine MacLean (1925–2019)	
2004	Charles L. Harness (1915–2005) as Author of Distinction	
2005	–	
2006	William F. Nolan (1928–2021)	
2007	D. G. Compton (1930–2023)	
2008	Ardath Mayhar (1930–2012)	
2009	M. J. Engh (1933–2024)	
2010	Neal Barrett, Jr. (1929–2014)	
2011	–	
2012	–	
2013	–	
2014	Frank M. Robinson (1926-2014) as Special Honoree	
