= Gloria Whelan =

American poet and children's writer (born 1923)

- Born: Gloria Rewoldt; November 23, 1923 (age 102); Detroit, Michigan, U.S.
- Education: University of Michigan (BA, MSW)
- Occupation: Writer
- Spouse: Joseph L. Whelan (1948)
- Children: 2
- Writing career
- Language: English

Gloria Whelan (born November 23, 1923) is an American poet, short story writer, and novelist known primarily for children's and young adult fiction. She won the annual National Book Award for Young People's Literature in 2000 for the novel Homeless Bird. She also won the 2013 Tuscany Prize for Catholic Fiction for her short story What World Is This? and the work became the title for the independent publisher's 2013 collection of short stories.

Whelan's books include many historical fiction novels, including a trilogy set on Mackinac Island and a quartet series set in communist Russia. Whelan is also the author of short stories which have appeared in The Ontario Review, The Virginia Quarterly Review, The Gettysburg Review, and other literary quarterlies. Her collection of short stories, Playing with Shadows, was published by the Illinois Press. Her stories have appeared in several anthologies and in Prize Stories: the O. Henry Awards. Whelan is, according to Liz Rosenberg of the Chicago Tribune, "an accomplished, graceful, and intelligent writer."

== Early life and education ==
Gloria was the daughter of William Rewoldt and Hildegarde Kilwinski Rewoldt, born 1923 in Detroit. She read many books as a girl, sometimes dictated stories that her baby sitter transcribed, and wrote poetry. She edited the high school newspaper.

She earned the bachelor's degree in 1945 and the Master of Social Work in 1948 at the University of Michigan.

== Career ==
In 1948, she and neurologist Joseph L. Whelan were married. They had two children and lived in the Detroit area where she was employed in social work. During that time she also wrote short stories and poetry.

The de Grummond Children's Literature Collection at the University of Southern Mississippi in Hattiesburg holds her papers. According to that archive:

In 1972, weary of the hectic pace of life in Detroit, the Whelans moved to a cabin on Oxbow Lake in the woods of northern Michigan, outside the small town of Mancelona. Their peace was soon disturbed, however, by an oil company that intended to drill on their property. Since the Whelans did not own the mineral rights to the land, the company razed three acres and sank an unsuccessful well, after which it departed. The experience inspired Whelan to write a children's novel about a young boy who worked on an oilrig. It was published as A Clearing in the Forest in 1978.

That was her first book.

Whelan was almost fifty-five when Putnam's published A Clearing in the Forest in July 1978. In nearly thirty-five years since then, she has written fifty-two books of fiction for children and young adults. Many have been set in rural northern Michigan, where she may be considered a regional author, but her settings include Africa, China, Vietnam, India, Czarist and communist Russia.

Listening for Lions is set in 1919 British East Africa (now in Kenya).

Whelan also writes short stories and poetry for adults. Her stories have been published in numerous literary quarterlies and anthologies including "Prize Stories: O'Henry Awards. Illinois Press published a collection of her stories, "Playing with Shadows" In 2013 Wayne State University published a collection of stories and a novella, "Living Together," which Joyce Carol Oates called "elegantly composed," and Nicholas Delbanco called, "Pitch perfect," and "A pleasure to read."

== Awards and honors ==
- 1999: Tuscany Prize (Best Short Story) "What World Is This?"
- 2003: National Outdoor Book Award (Children's Category), Jam & Jelly by Holly & Nellie
- 2000: National Book Award (Young People's Literature), Homeless Bird
- 2014: IPPY Silver Medal Short Story Fiction for "Living Together."

== Works ==
- Summer of the Tree Army (picture book) (2021)
- Bob Seger's House and Other Stories / Made in Michigan Writers Series (adult book) collection by various authors (2016)
- The Hedge School (2015)
- Queen Victoria’s Bathing Machine. Illustrated by Nancy Carpenter. Simon & Schuster, 2014.
- Bernida: A Michigan Sailing Legend (picture book) listed as Al Declercq and Tom Ervin with Gloria Whelan (2014)
- Living Together: Short Stories and a Novella / Made in Michigan Writers Series (adult) (2013)
- What World is This? And Other Stories (adult) collection by various authors (2013)
- All My Noble Dreams And Then What Happens (2013)
- What World Is This? And Other Stories (2013)
- In Andal’s House (picture book illustrated by Amanda Hall) (2013)
- Smudge and the Book of Mistakes: A Christmas Story (picture book) (2012)
- Small Acts of Amazing Courage (2011)
- The Boy Who Wanted to Cook (picture book) (2011)
- Megan’s Year / An Irish Traveler’s Story (picture book) (2011)
- See What I See (2011)
- The Listeners (2009)
- Waiting for the Owl's Call (2009)
- The Locked Garden (2009)
- K is for Kabuki (2009)
- After the Train (2009)
- The Disappeared (2008)
- Yuki and the One Thousand Carriers (picture book) (2008)
- Parade of Shadows (2007)
- Yatandou (picture book) (2007)
- Summer of the War (2006)
- The Turning (Russian Saga / Book 4) (2006)
- Mackinac Bridge / The Story of the Five-Mile Poem (picture book) (2006)
- Listening for Lions (2005)
- Chu Ju's House (Also published as First Girl) (2004)
- Burying the Sun (Russian Saga / Book 3) (2004)
- Friend on Freedom River (picture book) (2004)
- The Impossible Journey (Russian Saga / Book 2) (2003)
- A Haunted House in Starvation Lake (Starvation Lake / Book 4) (2003)
- Are There Bears in Starvation Lake? (Starvation Lake / Book 3) (2002)
- The Wanigan: A Life on the River (2002)
- Fruitlands: Louisa May Alcott Made Perfect (2002)
- Jam and Jelly by Holly and Nellie (picture book) (2002)
- Rich and Famous in Starvation Lake (Starvation Lake / Book 2) (2001)
- Angel on the Square (Russian Saga / Book 1) (2001) - telling the story of Katya, the daughter of a lady-in-waiting at the palace of St Petersburg around 1914.
- Homeless Bird (2000)
- Welcome to Starvation Lake (Starvation Lake / Book 1) (2000)
- Return to the Island (Mackinac Island Trilogy / Book 3) (2000)
- Miranda's Last Stand (1999)
- Forgive the River, Forgive the Sky (1998)
- Farewell to the Island (Mackinac Island Trilogy / Book 2) (1998)
- The Shadow of the Wolf (Libby Mitchell Trilogy / Book 3) (1997)
- The Miracle of St. Nicholas (picture book) (1997)
- Friends (1997)
- The Ambassador's Wife (adult book) (1997)
- The Indian School (1996)
- The President's Mother (adult book) (1996)
- Once On This Island (Mackinac Island Trilogy / Book 1) (1995)
- That Wild Berries Should Grow (1994)
- Night of the Full Moon (Libby Mitchell Trilogy / Book 2) (1993) (illustrated by Leslie W. Bowman)
- Goodbye, Vietnam (1992)
- Bringing the Farmhouse Home (picture book) (1992)
- Hannah (1991) (illustrated by Leslie W. Bowman)
- The Secret Keeper (1990)
- Silver (1988)
- A Week of Raccoons (picture book) (1988)
- Playing With Shadows (adult book) (1988)
- Next Spring an Oriole (Libby Mitchell Trilogy / Book 1) (1987)
- The Pathless Woods (1981)
- A Time to Keep Silent (1979)
- A Clearing in the Forest (1978)
