= Ekaterina Ivanova (mountaineer) =

Soviet and Russian mountaineer

- Born: April 1, 1962
- Died: October 10, 1994

Ekaterina Nikolaevna Ivanova (née Dorofeeva, Russian: Екатерина Николаевна Иванова; 1 April 1962 – 10 October 1994) was a Soviet and Russian mountaineer. In 1990, she became the first Soviet female to successfully climb Mount Everest, and was named as an Honoured Master of Sports of the USSR.

== Life ==
Ekaterina Dorofeeva was born on 1 April 1962 in Platovo village, Kurchum district, Kazakh SSR, in the foothills of Altai. Her father was a carpenter and her mother was a nurse. Dorofeeva studied at the Kurchum secondary school No. 1 named after Yuri Gagarin. In the first year of study at the Irkutsk Polytechnic Institute Dorofeeva began to engage in mountain tourism and rock climbing. She started mountaineering in 1980 in the Eastern Sayan Mountains, followed by the Caucasus, Pamir and Tien Shan. Constant training, camps and competitions allowed the young athlete to gain experience and soon become one of the best in Irkutsk. In 1983, Dorofeeva became a candidate master of sports in rock climbing. In 1984, she graduated from the Irkutsk Polytechnic Institute with a degree in geological engineering. Dorofeeva married Dmitry Ivanov.

In 1987, Ivanova was included in the USSR team and took part in training camps to prepare for the ascent to Kangchenjunga and in 1989, she became a member of the International (USA, USSR, China) expedition to Mount Everest.

On May 10, 1990, Ivanova became famous as the first Soviet woman and the eleventh woman in the world to conquer Everest. Descending from Everest, Ivanova discovered that she had become an honored master of sports. She was awarded the Order for Personal Courage becoming the first athlete to receive this order. The President of the USSR Mikhail Gorbachev and the US President George H. W. Bush congratulated her. Having climbed the Everest Ivanova decided to climb all eight-thousanders of the world.

On 4 August 1991, she gave birth to a daughter Ulyana.

In October 1992, Ivanova ascended Shishapangma, 8027 m, and in 1993 joined Kamchatka expedition to Manaslu. By 1994, Ivanova had climbed three mountains from among the 14 highest in the world.

== Death ==
In the fall of 1994, Ivanova joined the first Belarusian expedition to the third peak of the world – Kanchenjunga (8586 m). An alpinist from Belarus Sergey Zhvirblya became Ivanova's partner. On the night of October 9–10 three out of 12 people in the expedition, including Ivanova, died in an avalanche. After many days of searching, rescuers couldn't find the bodies of the mountaineers.

== Commemoration ==
- A sculptural composition at the Radishchevsky cemetery in Irkutsk, in memory of Ekaterina Ivanova and the climber Pavel Bonadysenko – a snow leopard on a wild rock.
- A memorial plaque in Irkutsk on the house where Ivanova lived (2012).

== Awards ==
- Order of Personal Courage (1990)
