= Poet Laureate of West Virginia =

Poet laureate for West Virginia, USA

- Incumbent; Marc Harshman since 2012
- Type: Poet laureate
- Formation: 1927
- First holder: Karl Myers

The poet laureate of West Virginia is the poet laureate for the U.S. state of West Virginia. West Virginia established the position of poet laureate by statute in 1927. The appointment was defined by statute as at the pleasure of the governor, but has become an indefinitely renewable two-year term.

== List of poets laureate ==
- Karl Myers (1927–1937)
- Roy Lee Harmon (March 12, 1937 – 1943)
- James Lowell McPherson (1943–1946)
- Roy Lee Harmon (October 11, 1946 – 1960)
- Vera Andrews Harvey (1960–1961)
- Roy Lee Harmon (March 7, 1961 – 1979)
- Louse McNeil (Pease) (1979–1993)
- Irene McKinney (1994–2012)
- Marc Harshman (2012– )

== See also ==
- Poet laureate
- List of U.S. state poets laureate
- United States Poet Laureate
