= Marc Harshman =

American poet (born 1950)

- Born: October 1, 1950 (age 75); Randolph County, Indiana, U.S.
- Education: Bethany College; Yale Divinity School (MA); University of Pittsburgh (MA)
- Occupation: Poet
- Spouse: Cheryl Ryan (m. 1976)
- Children: 1
- Website: marcharshman.com

Marc Harshman (born October 1, 1950) is a Poet Laureate for the state of West Virginia. He was appointed as West Virginia's Poet Laureate on May 18, 2012 by former governor Earl Ray Tomblin. Harshman is well-known for his numerous children's books and works in public poetry.

== Biography ==
Marc Harshman was born and raised in Randolph County, Indiana. Growing up in rural area of Indiana, Harshman has cited reading as an important influence on his development as a writer. He has described books as allowing him to imagine places beyond his surroundings and inspiring his lifelong interest in words and storytelling.

He attended Bethany College, graduating in 1973. Harshman then went on to earn a Master of Arts in Religion from Yale Divinity School in 1975 and a Master of Arts from the University of Pittsburgh in 1978. Later on, Harshman received additional honorary doctorates from his alma mater, Bethany College, and West Liberty University for the recognition of his life's work.

Between earning his degrees, Harshman married fellow writer Cheryl Ryan in August 1976. They have one daughter, Sarah, who works as a children's librarian. Harshman and his wife Cheryl live in Moundsville, West Virginia.

In 2012, Harshman was appointed the West Virginia State Poet Laureate. Under West Virginia law, the state poet laureate must be a resident of the state and have written and published works of recognized merit. The poet laureate serves at the pleasure of the governor and receives an annual stipend of $2,000.

== Career ==
Marc Harshman began his career as an educator, working as a grade-school teacher and college professor. He taught creative writing at the University of Pittsburgh and West Virginia Northern Community College before becoming an elementary school teacher at Sandy Hill Elementary School in Dallas, West Virginia. He continues to conduct writing workshops at Sandy Hill Elementary School.

Harshman published his first poetry book, Turning Out the Stones in 1983, followed by his first children’s book, A Little Excitement, in 1989. He has since published numerous collections of poetry and children's books, including The Storm (1995), which received a Smithsonian Award. Following the death of West Virginia Poet Laureate Irene McKinney in 2012, Harshman was appointed the state's ninth Poet Laureate.

In addition to his writing, Harshman has hosted The Poetry Break, a radio program that first aired in January 2016. His work often draws on themes related to place, memory, and rural life, reflecting aspects of his upbringing in Indiana and his experiences in West Virginia.

== Publications ==
=== Poetry ===
- Believe What You Can: Poems (Vandalia Press, 2016)
- Woman in Red Anorak: Poems (Lynx House Press, 2018)
- Green-Silver and Silent: Poems (Bottom Dog Press, 2012)
- Local Journeys (Finishing Line Press, 2005)
- A Song for West Virginia (Quarrier Press, 2014)
- All That Feed Us: West Virginia Poems(2013)
- Local Journeys(2004)
- Rose of Sharon(1999)
- Turning out the Stones(1983)

=== Children's books ===
- The Storm (Scholastic, 1997)
- A Little Excitement (Quarrier Press, 2002)
- Fallingwater: The Building of Frank Lloyd Wright’s Masterpiece
- One Big Family
- Mountain Christmas
- Only One Neighborhood
- Roads
- Red Are the Apples
- All the Way to Morning
- Moving Days
- Uncle James
- Only One
- Rocks in my Pocket
- Snow Company

== Awards and achievements ==
- West Virginia State English Teacher in 1995
- “Believe What you Can” was the winner of the 2017 Weatherford Award
- “The Storm” earned many awards…
  - Junior Library Guild Selection
  - Smithsonian Notable Book for Children
  - Children’s Book Council Notable Book for Social Studies
  - 1995 Parent’s Choice Award Recipient
- Recipient of the WV Arts Commission Fellowship in Poetry in 2000
- Fellowship in Children's Literature in 2008
- Ezra Jack Keats/Kerlan Collection Fellowship from the University of Minnesota for research on Scandinavian myths and folklore
