= Garfield, Washington =

Garfield
- Town
- Garfield, Washington
- Nickname: Jewel of the Palouse
- Location of Garfield, Washington
- Coordinates: 47°0′33″N 117°8′31″W
- Country: United States
- State: Washington
- County: Whitman
- Established: 1890

Government
  - Type: Mayor–council
  - Mayor: Jarrod Pfaff

Area
  - Total: 0.94 sq mi (2.44 km^{2})
  - Land: 0.94 sq mi (2.44 km^{2})
  - Water: 0 sq mi (0.00 km^{2})
- Elevation: 2,497 ft (761 m)

Population (2020)
  - Total: 562
  - Density: 597/sq mi (230/km^{2})
- Time zone: UTC-8 (Pacific (PST))
  - Summer (DST): UTC-7 (PDT)
- ZIP code: 99130
- Area code: 509
- FIPS code: 53-26140
- GNIS feature ID: 2412669
- Website: City of Garfield

Garfield is a town in Whitman County, Washington, United States. The population was 562 at the 2020 census.

== History ==
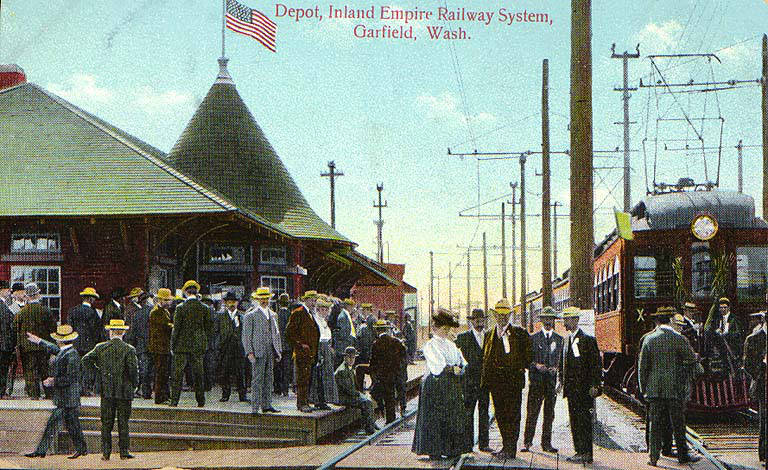
Garfield depot, 1910

Garfield was founded in the early 1880s by Samuel J. Tant, who named the town after James A. Garfield, the 20th President of the United States.

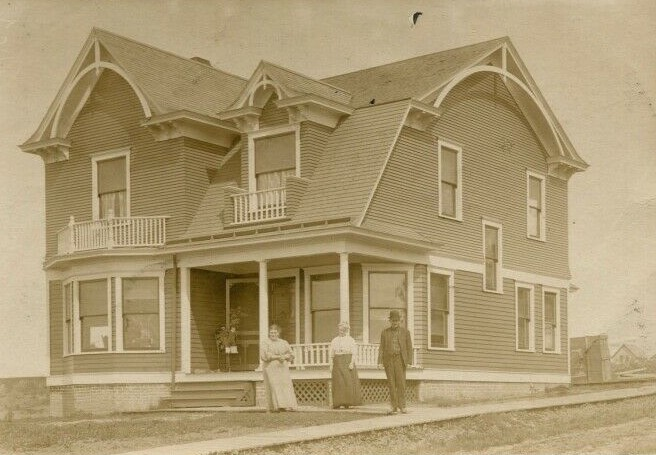
A house in Garfield, Washington was shown on a postcard printed 1904-1918

== Geography ==
According to the United States Census Bureau, the town has a total area of 0.88 square miles (2.28 km^{2}), all of it land.

== Demographics ==
Historical population
Census	Pop.	Note	%±
1890	317		—
1900	697		119.9%
1910	932		33.7%
1920	776		−16.7%
1930	703		−9.4%
1940	674		−4.1%
1950	674		0.0%
1960	607		−9.9%
1970	610		0.5%
1980	599		−1.8%
1990	544		−9.2%
2000	641		17.8%
2010	597		−6.9%
2020	562		−5.9%
U.S. Decennial Census

=== 2010 census ===
As of the 2010 census, there were 597 people, 279 households, and 164 families living in the town. The population density was 678.4 inhabitants per square mile (261.9/km^{2}). There were 311 housing units at an average density of 353.4 per square mile (136.4/km^{2}). The racial makeup of the town was 97.3% White, 0.2% African American, 0.2% Native American, 0.3% from other races, and 2.0% from two or more races. Hispanic or Latino of any race were 2.3% of the population.

There were 279 households, of which 24.7% had children under the age of 18 living with them, 46.2% were married couples living together, 9.3% had a female householder with no husband present, 3.2% had a male householder with no wife present, and 41.2% were non-families. 36.9% of all households were made up of individuals, and 16.5% had someone living alone who was 65 years of age or older. The average household size was 2.14 and the average family size was 2.71.

The median age in the town was 46.3 years. 20.6% of residents were under the age of 18; 5.2% were between the ages of 18 and 24; 23% were from 25 to 44; 31.2% were from 45 to 64; and 20.3% were 65 years of age or older. The gender makeup of the town was 46.1% male and 53.9% female.

=== 2000 census ===
As of the 2000 census, there were 641 people, 256 households, and 174 families living in the town. The population density was 953.8 people per square mile (369.4/km^{2}). There were 288 housing units at an average density of 428.5 per square mile (166.0/km^{2}). The racial makeup of the town was 97.50% White, 0.47% Native American, 0.16% Asian, 0.16% from other races, and 1.72% from two or more races. Hispanic or Latino of any race were 0.31% of the population.

There were 256 households, out of which 34.8% had children under the age of 18 living with them, 54.7% were married couples living together, 9.8% had a female householder with no husband present, and 32.0% were non-families. 28.5% of all households were made up of individuals, and 12.5% had someone living alone who was 65 years of age or older. The average household size was 2.50 and the average family size was 3.09.

In the town, the age distribution of the population shows 30.7% under the age of 18, 4.2% from 18 to 24, 26.4% from 25 to 44, 22.5% from 45 to 64, and 16.2% who were 65 years of age or older. The median age was 39 years. For every 100 females, there were 100.3 males. For every 100 females age 18 and over, there were 93.0 males.

The median income for a household in the town was $36,250, and the median income for a family was $41,923. Males had a median income of $32,917 versus $22,222 for females. The per capita income for the town was $17,804. About 5.9% of families and 12.9% of the population were below the poverty line, including 21.4% of those under age 18 and 11.5% of those age 65 or over.
