= Representation of slavery in European art =

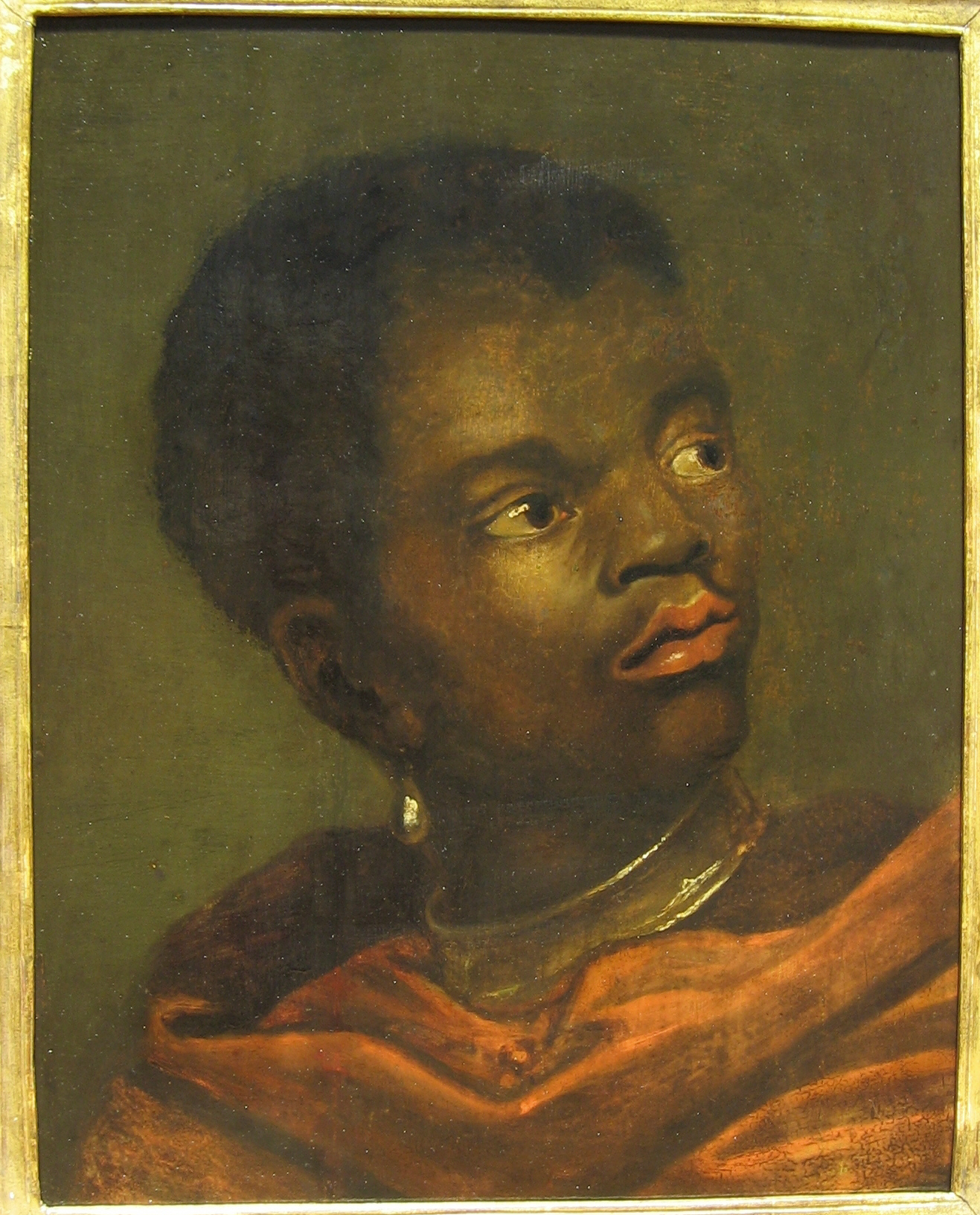
Black boy with slave collar, Dutch 17th-century painting

Representations of slavery in European art date back to ancient times. They show slaves of varied ethnicity, white as well as black.

The black in European art is not the same topic as the slave in European art: slaves were not always black and black people not always slaves. The article also concentrates on European art rather than Western art in general.

== Slaves in art ==
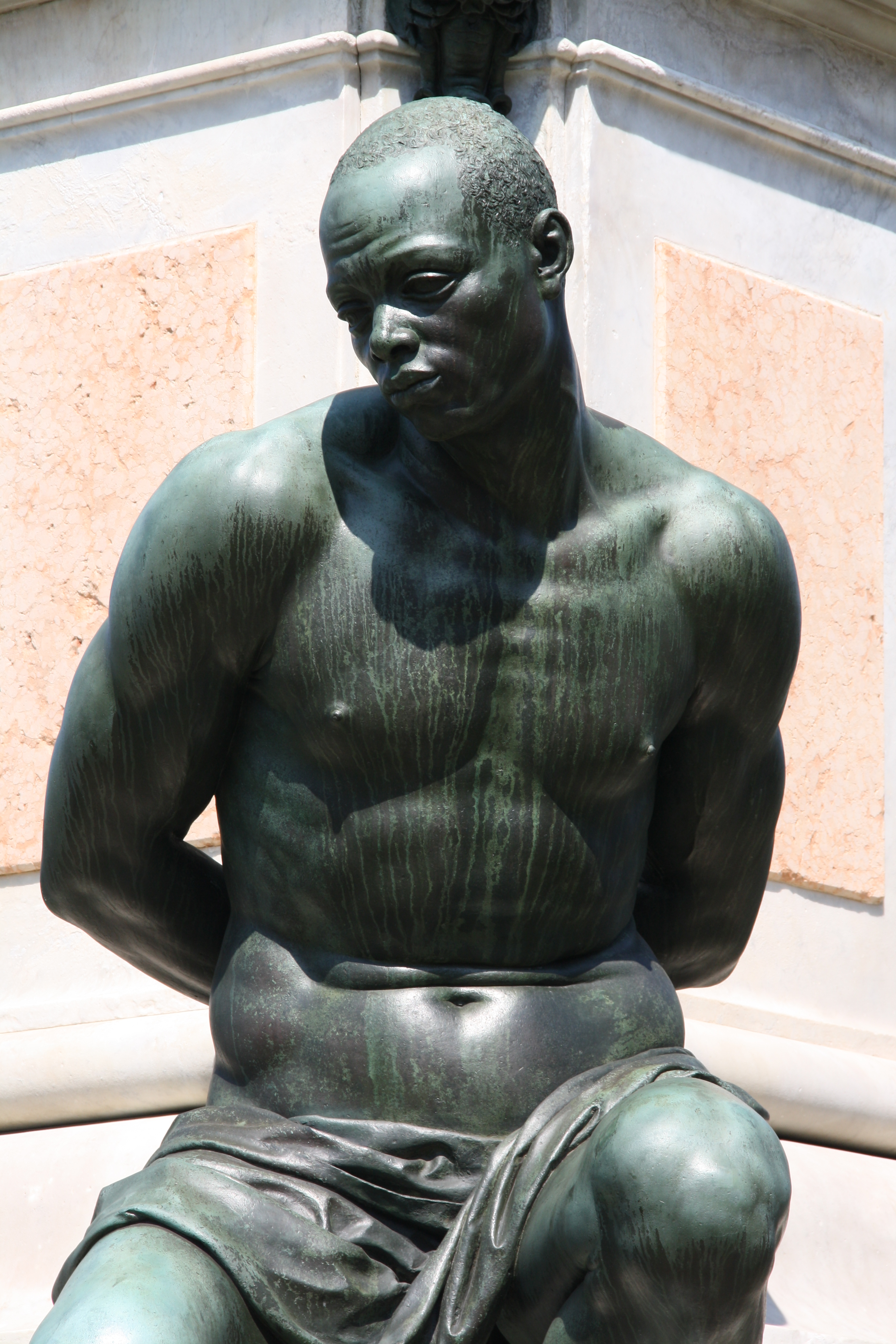
This and three other statues of chained slaves, placed at the base of the Monument of the Four Moors at Livorno, Italy, might have been made with actual slaves as models, whose names and circumstances remain unknown.

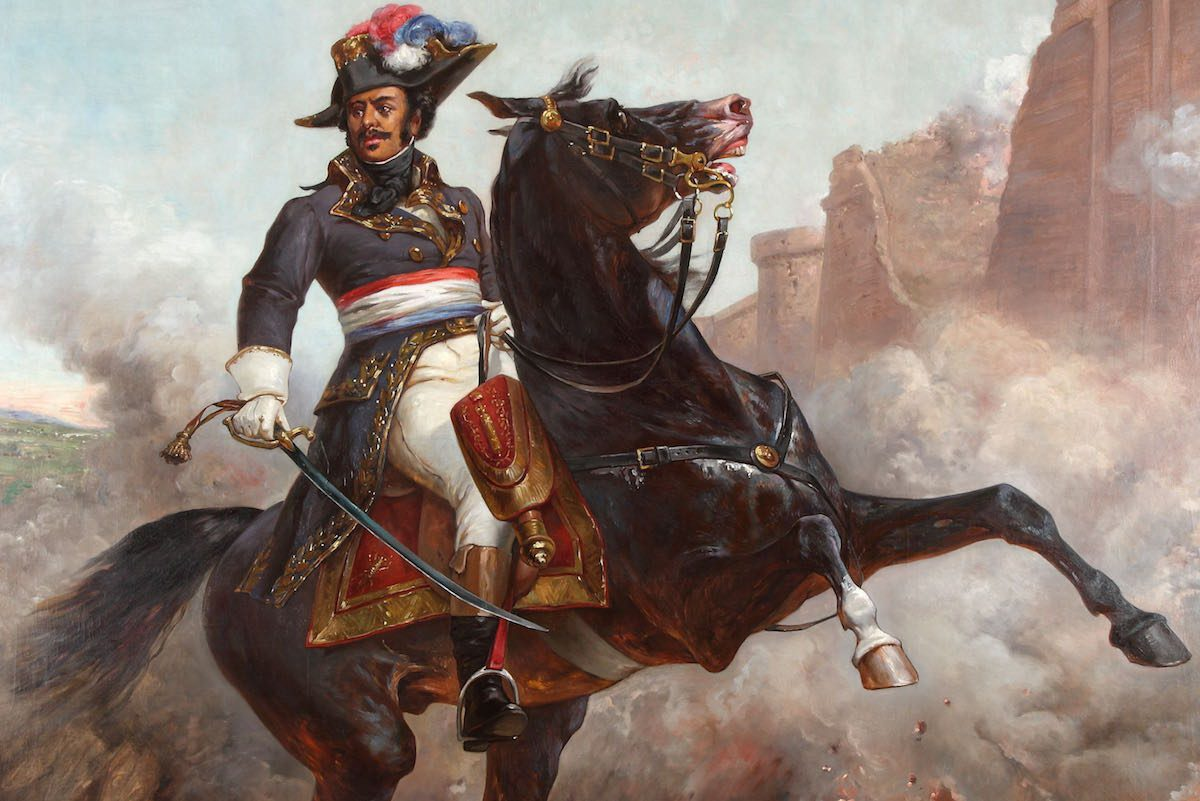
Thomas Alexandre Dumas

From the Renaissance onwards, a substantial number of bound figures, often naked and crouching, illustrate enslavement. This imagery had for one of its roots the ancient tradition of Roman Triumph, but its contemporaneous relevance was greatly magnified by the prevalence of slavery within European countries. In particular, galley slaves were often used by artists as models for muscular nude bodies.

Sometimes the name of an individual who was a slave is known. One instance is Juan de Pareja (1606–1670) who was a slave of Velázquez and was trained as a painter by the artist. Velázquez freed Juan de Pareja in 1650 and the document of manumission survives. Juan de Pareja became a successful artist himself.

Alexandre Dumas of The Three Musketeers fame, was the son of a slave, also known as Alexandre, who rose to be a general in chief in the French army. His portrait hardly suggests his early life as a slave. He was pawned by his father who was a French nobleman but was lucky enough to be retrieved by the father and brought up in France.

Frans Post (1612—1680) and Albert Eckhout (c.1610–1665) were two early Dutch painters to depict slavery. Post painted pictures of slaves working in idyllic rural landscapes which do little to reflect the harsh realities of their life. Eckhout's work is a visual record of the ethnic mix in Dutch Brazil.

== Iconographic aspects of slavery ==
The trade in black Africans was widespread in Europe long before the Triangular Trade involving Europe, Africa and the Americas. Numerous portraits of high-class Europeans show them in the company of black figures, often children, whose status may be advertised by the silver slave collar being worn. A silver collar is usually worn in conjunction with luxurious clothes and other finery, which allowed the artist to show off his repertoire and the owner of the slave to show off his or her wealth. In fact, in the 17th and 18th centuries, it was the fashion among some wealthy Europeans to have their black household slaves or servants wear silver collars; these were often inscribed with the name of the owner or employer. The slave collar is seen in contemporary paintings.

Chains, fetters, manacles, slave collars are the familiar iconographic markers of slavery with the broken chain being particularly useful for dis-enslavement.

Slaves were chattel and so it is no surprise to see that they were on occasion branded like cattle in life and in art. Another sign of slavery, less obvious and much less gruesome, was the cropped pony tail or topknot which marked an enslaved Turk in the galleys.

Often slaves were prisoners captured in war and there is an iconographical overlap between the two. Michelangelo's Dying Slave was not given this title by him. He instead talked of such figures as prisoners. The slave status of Caryatids is similarly open to interpretation.

== Abolitionism ==
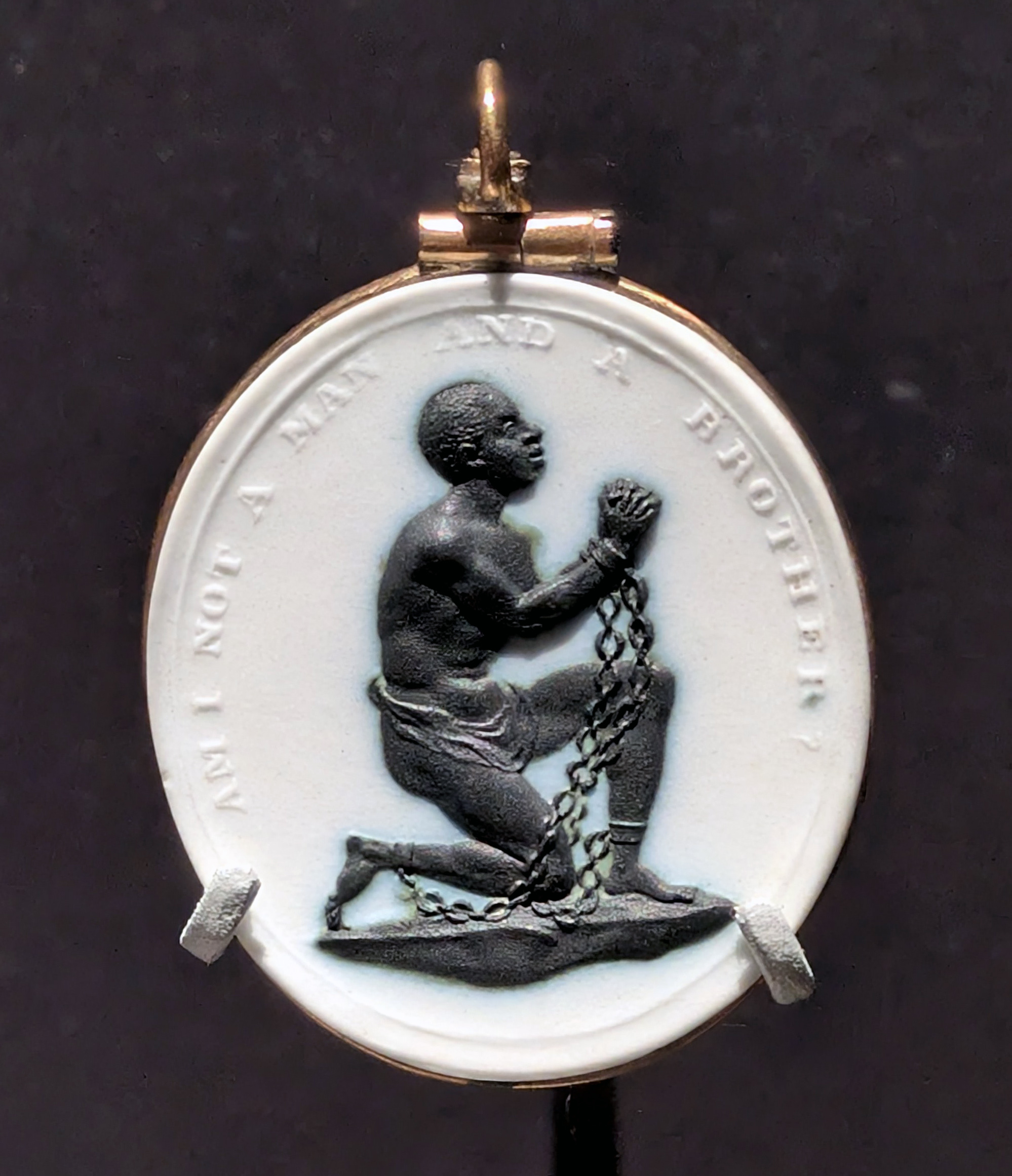
Anti-Slavery Medallion by Josiah Wedgwood

With Abolitionism, the imagery of enslavement was turned to a social and political purpose. An instance of this is the medallion devised for the movement by Josiah Wedgwood which shows a pleading black slave. People wore the medallion as a token of their commitment to abolitionism.

An example of an anti-Abolitionist image is that by George Cruikshank, New Union Club. It satirises what supposedly took place at a celebrated dinner organised by Abolitionists.

== See also ==
- History of slavery
- Page (servant)
- Slavery in antiquity

== References and notes ==
=== General references ===
- Black is Beautiful: Rubens to Dumas, ed Esther Schreuder and Elmer Kolfin, exhibition catalogue, Amsterdam (Nieuwe Kerk), 2008
- The Image of the Black in Western Art ed Ladislas Bugner, various volumes
- The Slave in European Art eds Elizabeth McGrath and Jean Michel Massing 2012
