= Louise McNeill =

American poet (1911–1993)

- Born: January 9, 1911; Pocahontas County, West Virginia, U.S.
- Died: June 16, 1993 (aged 82); Malden, West Virginia, U.S.
- Education: Concord College; Miami University; West Virginia University; Middlebury College; Iowa Writers' Workshop
- Occupations: Poet; essayist; historian
- Spouse: Roger Pease (m. 1939; died 1990)
- Children: 1

Louise McNeill (January 9, 1911 – June 16, 1993), also known as Louise McNeill Pease, was an American poet, essayist, and historian of Appalachia. She began teaching in a one roomed schoolhouse in West Virginia and would eventually move on to teach at other universities. She would eventually become a professor of history and English at West Virginia University where her archives are held today.

== Life ==
McNeill was born January 9, 1911, in Pocahontas County, West Virginia, US, on a farm in Buckeye that her family had owned since 1769. Her father, G. D. McNeill, was also a writer and published a collection of short stories about the forests of Pocahontas County, West Virginia, and the decline of the wilderness entitled The Last Forest. She wrote her first poem at 16 on a friend's typewriter, and thereafter decided to be a poet. She graduated from Concord College (now Concord University), where she was a member of Alpha Sigma Tau sorority, and then obtained her master's degree from Miami University in Ohio. She received a doctorate from West Virginia University in History, and also received an honorary doctorate in the humanities from the university later. She also studied at Middlebury College at the Bread Loaf Writers' Conference with the poet Robert Frost, and at the Iowa Writers' Workshop. In 1939, she married Roger Pease. McNeill taught English and history for over 30 years, beginning in rural one-room schools in West Virginia and eventually teaching at Potomac State College, Fairmont State College, and West Virginia University. McNeill's husband Roger died in 1990. McNeill died on June 18, 1993, in Malden, West Virginia, survived by her son Douglas McNeill.

== Career ==
Louise McNeill began her writing career selling short poems to the Saturday Evening Post, charging $5 a line. In 1931, her first collection, Mountain White, was published. She went on to publish six other collections, each being published under her maiden name even after she married in 1939. She published her best-known work, Gauley Mountain, in 1939. This work would establish McNeill as a very skilled technical writer of poetry, combining rhythm and imagery into an art form. She incorporated themes of life in rural Appalachia in her work, and "was often hailed for her unflinching acceptance of local speech and dialect into the overall construction of her rhythmic poetry." McNeill published poetry over the course of her life, earning praise from another Appalachian author, Jesse Stuart, who, in 1964, wrote her saying, "Girl, there is genius in you...you are a first class poet." She would not publish another major collection of her poetry until 1972, with the publication of Paradox Hill. In the 1980s, McNeill's literary reputation was re-established by the poet Maggie Anderson, who edited McNeill's memoir for the University of Pittsburgh Press, as well as new and selected poems in 1991.

In 1979, then-governor Jay Rockefeller named McNeill West Virginia's poet laureate, and she held the title until her death in 1993. In February 1989, West Virginia University recognized her accomplishments by inducting her into the Academy of Distinguished Alumni. In May 1989, West Virginia also awarded her an honorary doctorate in the Humanities. In October 2006, the Charles C. Wise, Jr. Library at West Virginia University was made a Literary Landmark by the Friends of the Library Association U.S.A. (now United for Libraries), in recognition of the university's connection with McNeill and its efforts to preserve her writings and personal papers in its West Virginia and Regional History Center.

== Works ==
=== Poetry ===
- Mountain White (1931)
- Gauley Mountain (1939)
- Time Is Our House (1942)
- The Prison Notebook of Captain James M. McNeill, CSA (1969, 1970)
- Poems From the Hills (1971)
- Paradox Hill from Appalachia to Lunar Shore (1972)
- Elderberry Flood, the History, Lore and Land of West Virginia Written in Verse Form (1979, 1980)
- Hill Daughter: New and Selected Poems (1991)
- Fermi Buffalo (1994)

=== Historical ===
- The Great Kanawha in the Old South, 1671-1861: A Study in Contradictions (1959)
- Microcosm and 'Magic Mountain': Interpretations of the Virginia Springs (1969, 1970)

=== Autobiography ===
- The Milkweed Ladies (1988)
