= Flight into Egypt (Pareja) =

1658 painting by Juan de Pareja

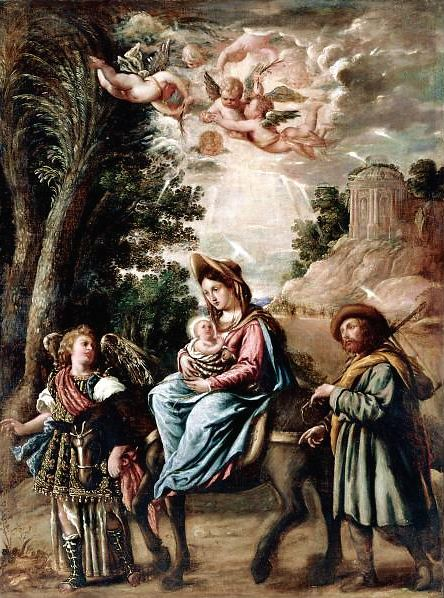
- Artist: Juan de Pareja
- Year: 1658
- Medium: Oil on canvas
- Dimensions: 66 1/2 × 49 3/8 in

Flight into Egypt is a 1658 oil painting by Juan de Pareja. The painting, now housed in the Ringling Museum of Art in Sarasota, Florida, was the first of Pareja's works to enter the United States after being acquired by the Ringling brothers in the 1920s. The painting is one of many paintings on religious subjects among Pareja's surviving works. Pareja's authorship is confirmed by his signature and the date inscribed on the rock towards the lower left of the canvas, identifying it as his earliest known work to date. The work marks Pareja's transition from an enslaved assistant in artist Diego Velázquez's studio to an independent artist. Its bright color palette, structured composition, and religious symbolism reveal its fusion of both Spanish and Venetian artistic traditions.

== Description ==
The Virgin Mary is depicted wearing a blue cloak and red dress, cradling the child Christ as they ride a donkey directed by an angel and followed by Saint Joseph. Above them, angels fly carrying palm fronds. The angels' luminous quality highlights Pareja's characteristic technique of outlining bright color choices with white accents. This technique is further visible in Christ's robe. In the distance, a date palm rises from the rugged landscape, emphasizing the composition's focus on the environment as much as the figures in the foreground. To the right of Mary's head, small, tight brushstrokes depict the Massacre of the Innocents (Matthew 2:16-2:18), the event that the Holy Family is fleeing from according to the biblical account.

Technical analysis revealed that the painting was created over an earlier composition of the same figures in a different sequence and at a smaller scale. It is not known whether the underlying image was created by another artist whose canvas Pareja reused or if Pareja reworked an earlier picture of his own.

== Context and influences ==
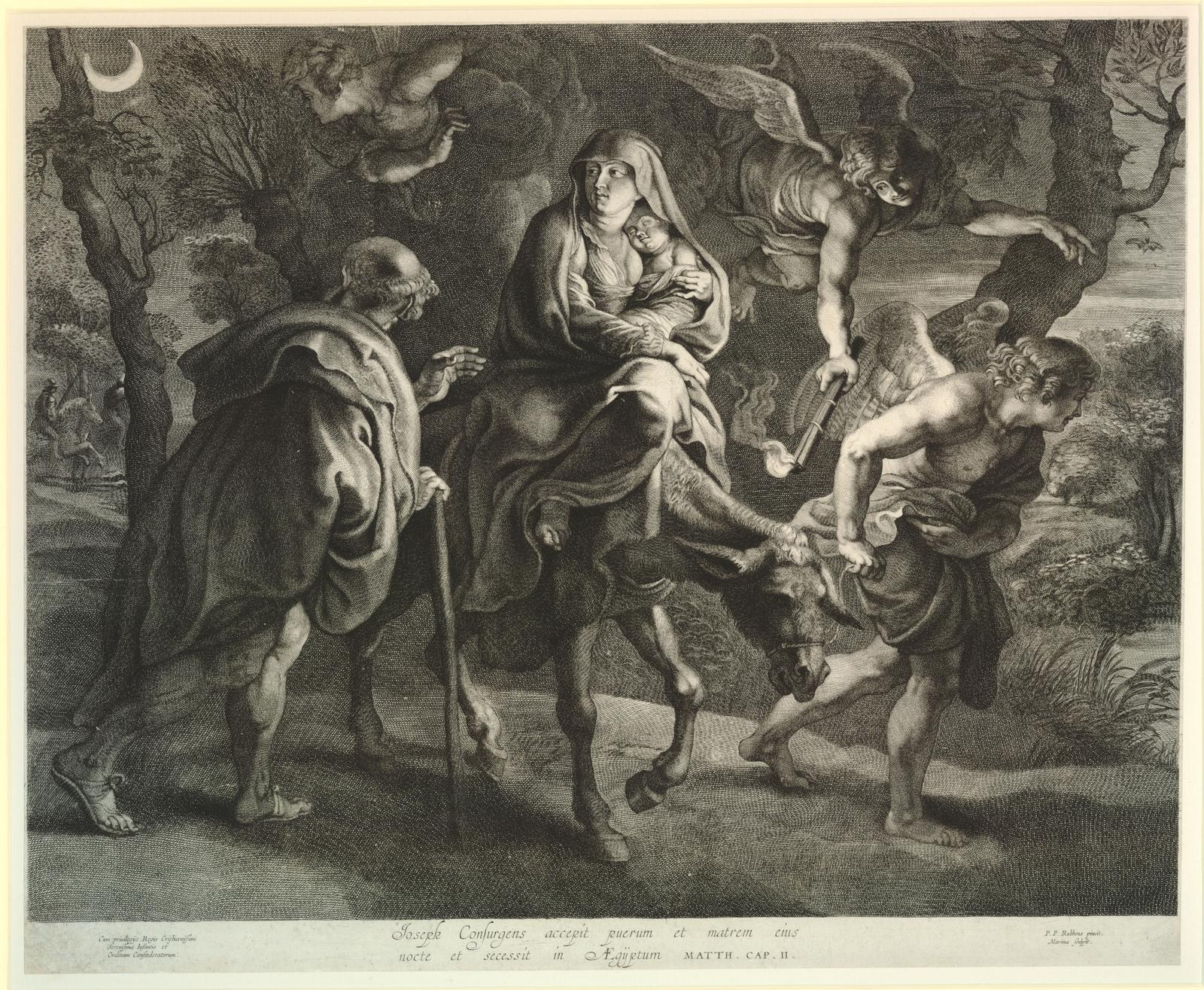
Ignatius Cornelis Marinus, after Peter Paul Rubens, Flight into Egypt, 1650

The arrangement of the Holy Family in a frieze-like configuration may represent Pareja's familiarity with Northern European artistic traditions for representing the Flight into Egypt. These precedents include Ignatius Cornelis Marinus's print of the Flight into Egypt, based on a painting by Peter Paul Rubens.

The sky from which the angel emerges particularly highlights Pareja's familiarity with the Venetian paint palette, while his textured, rough brushwork heightens the painting's dramatic atmosphere.

Rubens's Return from Egypt may have also influenced the depiction of vegetation, particularly the palm trees, based on the apocryphal story of the palms bending as the Holy Family passed by. Pareja may have encountered Rubens's painting via Lucas Vorsterman II's engraving of it.
