= Elizabeth Borton de Treviño =

American writer

Mary Elizabeth Victoria Borton de Treviño (September 2, 1904 – December 2, 2001) was an American writer. She received the Newbery Medal.

== Early life and education ==
Elizabeth was born in Bakersfield, California, to Carrie Louise Christensen and attorney Fred Ellsworth Borton. Her family were all enthusiastic readers; Fred had published short stories and poems before becoming a lawyer. Elizabeth always wanted to become an author. She began writing poetry at age 6, and had her first poem published at 8. Her parents strongly encouraged her ambitions.

She attended Stanford University, graduating Phi Beta Kappa in 1925 with a bachelor's degree in Latin American History.

== Career ==
After finishing college, she moved to Massachusetts to study violin at the Boston Conservatory, then worked as a reporter.

On August 10, 1935, she married Luis Jorge Treviño Arreola y Gómez Sánchez de la Barquera (b. August 5, 1902) and moved to his hometown of Monterrey, Mexico. After their two sons, Luis Federico and Enrique Ricardo Treviño-Borton, were born, they lived in Monterrey for a time, then moved to Mexico City in 1941. Their final move was to Cuernavaca, Morelos, in 1965, known popularly as the "City of Eternal Spring".

Her book I, Juan de Pareja (1965) won the Newbery Medal in 1966. It was inspired by her elder son Luis' interest in art, particularly painting. Luis told her the story of the artist Diego Velázquez and his slave Juan de Pareja, model for one of Velázquez' most famous paintings, whom Velázquez instructed in painting and later freed. After seeing the original of Velázquez' painting of Juan, she was inspired to write about their relationship. Her younger son Enrique was the translator of the Spanish edition of the novel.

Among her other novels are Nacar the White Deer, The Greek of Toledo, Casilda of the Rising Moon, El Güero: A True Adventure Story (illustrated by Leslie W. Bowman), Beyond the Gates of Hercules, and The Fourth Gift. She also wrote five of the "Pollyanna" books: Pollyanna in Hollywood, Pollyanna's Castle in Mexico, Pollyanna's Door To Happiness, Pollyanna's Golden Horseshoe, and Pollyanna and the Secret Mission.

Borton later wrote several memoirs of her life as an American who had married into a traditional Mexican family: the best-seller My Heart Lies South and its sequels, Where the Heart Is and The Hearthstone of My Heart. Her last book, Leona: A Love Story, was published in 1994, when she was 90.

== Death ==
She died at 97 on December 2, 2001, in Cuernavaca, Mexico.
