= D. B. Cooper in popular culture =

1971 plane hijacker

D. B. Cooper is a media epithet for an unidentified man (whose actual alias given was, Dan Cooper) who hijacked a Boeing 727 on November 24, 1971, extorted a US$200,000 ransom (equivalent to $1.59 million today), and parachuted to an unknown fate. Only $5,880 of the ransom money has been found, and the crime continues to influence popular culture, and has inspired references in books, film, and music.

== Literature ==
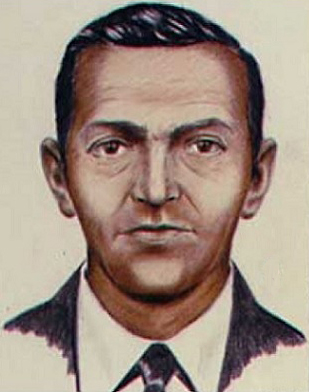
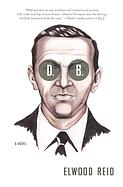
The cover of Elwood Reid's D. B.: a novel, which borrows from the 1972 FBI sketch (top)

=== Non-fiction books ===
==== General investigation ====
- D.B. Cooper: Dead or Alive? by Richard T. Tosaw (1984).
- Skyjack: The Hunt for D.B. Cooper by Geoffrey Gray (2011).
- DB Cooper and the FBI: A Case Study of America's Only Unsolved Skyjacking by Bruce Smith (2015 1st Edition; 2016 2nd Edition; 2021 3rd Edition).
- D.B. Cooper and Flight 305: Reexamining the Hijacking and Disappearance by Robert H. Edwards (2021).

==== Suspect/conspiracy theories ====
- D.B. Cooper: What Really Happened by Max Gunther (1985).
- Into the Blast by Skipp Porteous and Robert Blevins (2011).
- D.B. Cooper: Examined, Identified, and Exposed by Nat Loufoque (2019).
- The Last Master Outlaw: The Award-Winning Conclusion of the D.B. Cooper Mystery by Thomas J. Colbert (2021).

=== Novels ===
- James M. Cain's 1975 novel Rainbow's End is a fictional account of what might have happened to Cooper after he parachuted from the plane.
- J.D. Reed's 1980 novel Free Fall was used as a basis for the 1981 film The Pursuit of D. B. Cooper.
- Elwood Reid's 2004 novel D. B.: a novel is a fictionalized account of what supposedly happened to the real Cooper in the years following the hijacking, as a pair of FBI agents attempt to pick up his trail and arrest him. In one edition, the book jacket cover featured artwork derived from the FBI composite sketch of the real Cooper.
- The 1998 novel Sasquatch by Roland Smith features a character named Buckley Johnson, who eventually admits that he is D. B. Cooper to the novel's protagonist, a boy named Dylan Hickock. In this story, Johnson says he committed the hijacking to pay for cancer treatments for his son.
- Greg Cox's 2008 novel The 4400: The Vesuvius Prophecy features Cooper (see also the television series The 4400).
- The hijacking is a central plot point of the 2021 novel Bloodless by Douglas Preston and Lincoln Child.
- D.L. Hynes' 2020 novel The Man in 18-E, the first of a trilogy of fantasy novels involving historical mysteries, features two accidental time-travelers who find themselves in 1971 and, unable to return, decide to travel to Portland to solve the D.B. Cooper case as it happens.
- Stephen King's 1982 novella Rita Hayworth and Shawshank Redemption, later adapted into the 1994 film The Shawshank Redemption, contains a reference to D. B. Cooper. The story's narrator, Red, humorously suggests that a fellow prisoner, Sid Nedeau, may have been Cooper under an alias, implying that he successfully escaped both from Shawshank and, years later, from an airplane hijacking.

=== Short stories ===
- In the SCP Foundation collaborative writing project, D.B. Cooper is featured in SCP-101 - Hungry Bag. In the short story, the body of Cooper was found in 1979 in the Cascade Mountains alongside SCP-101, having died from blood loss due to the bag biting his arm off and consuming it. Cooper's fate was classified by the SCP Foundation as part of their recovery of SCP-101. Another version of D.B. Cooper is featured in SCP-5017 - Hard Landing, in which Cooper is depicted as an immortal Druid by the name of Cathbhadh who has been fighting against the Foundation for 2000 years.

=== Comics ===
- La vérité sur l'affaire D. B. Cooper written by Marie Boisson is a french comic book inspired by the case, published by MISMA editions in 2025.
- The Dilbert strip for January 17, 1991, featured Dogbert exhibiting Cooper's remains, with the punchline, "He learned that you should never get your parachutes from the same people you're robbing".
- The webcomic xkcd has a strip titled "D. B. Cooper", in which it was theorized that actor-filmmaker Tommy Wiseau was D. B. Cooper, and had financed his infamous 2003 cult film The Room with the funds from the robbery. A later xkcd strip posited that Cooper had been stranded alive in a tree since his jump.
- A 1989 strip from Gary Larson's The Far Side shows "Ben & Vera's Rottweiler Farm" and a bunch of dogs looking up at a man with a parachute with the caption "The Untold Ending of D.B. Cooper".
- Cooper appears as a major protagonist in the 2017 Image Comics series Elsewhere.
- Canadian webcomic artist Ryan North has a running joke that consists of suspicious intimations that he is "definitely not DB Cooper".

== Film and television ==
=== Film ===
- The 1981 film titled The Pursuit of D. B. Cooper, directed by Roger Spottiswoode and starring Treat Williams as Cooper and Robert Duvall as an insurance investigator pursuing him; based on J. D. Reed's 1980 novel Free Fall.
- In Without a Paddle (2004), a group of three old friends (Matthew Lillard, Seth Green and Dax Shepard), go on a camping trip to search for the treasure of D. B. Cooper to honor their recently deceased friend.
- The Mystery of D.B. Cooper is a documentary about the case by John Dower.
- COOPER: A Star Trek Fan Production is a 2024 short film in which Cooper is actually a time-traveling Federation agent.
- In the season-three premiere of Bigtop Burger entitled "OVEN", Cooper is shown to have been imprisoned in the underworld among other eccentric folk legends. He is played by Tim Batt.

=== Television ===
- In the fourth season (1979–1980) of the series In Search of..., the show dedicated an episode to the D.B. Cooper hijacking.
- A 1979 episode of Quincy, M.E. features an episode about the body of a famous parachuting hijacker being found five years after the hijacking, hanging dead from a tree in a National Park.
- The main character of the television series Twin Peaks (1990) is named Dale Bartholomew Cooper, after D. B. Cooper.
- On NewsRadio, a three-part story arc in season 5 had FBI agents arresting Jimmy James, believing him to be D.B. Cooper. It is later revealed that Cooper is actually Adam West, who appears at James' trial and confesses to his crimes to exonerate James.
- In Journeyman's "The Legend of Dylan McCleen," Jeffrey Pierce plays Dylan McCleen/John Richie, an Army Ranger who highjacked an airplane, and parachuted out with the ransom money, whose identity was still unknown decades later (2007).
- In the television series Prison Break, the character Charles Westmoreland is later revealed to be D.B. Cooper. He was caught and convicted in another case serving sentence in the same prison as the protagonists.
- The eighth episode of the second season of AMC's crime drama Breaking Bad, "Better Call Saul" (April 26, 2009), includes a scene in which lawyer Saul Goodman jokingly refers to series protagonist Walter White as Cooper due to his sunglasses and unusual attire.
- In the Numb3rs episode "Old Soldiers", the main cast discovers money from the D.B. Cooper heist, which then leads them to finding the elusive thief himself.
- In the 30 Rock episode "Alexis Goodlooking and the Case of the Missing Whisky", Kenneth makes a reference to D.B. Cooper as a joke that his father may have been the hijacker.
- On August 26, 2012, season 5, episode 6 of Leverage aired "The D.B. Cooper Job". Agent McSweeten, who still thinks that Parker and Hardison are undercover FBI, asks the team to look into the case that obsesses his dying father: the 1971 plane hijacking by D. B. Cooper.
- In White Rabbit Project's fifth episode, "Heist!" (2016), co-host Tory Belleci presented the hijacking as one of his contenders for the episode, with placing second overall after averaging the episode's three criteria: amount stolen, time at large, and degree of difficulty.
- The first episode of the Disney+ series Loki, set in the Marvel Cinematic Universe and titled "Glorious Purpose", Cooper is revealed to be Loki, who hijacked the plane after having lost a bet to Thor and disappeared into the Bifrost after jumping from the rear stairs. It first aired on June 9, 2021. Unlike the real Cooper, however, Loki's jump is seen to take place during daylight and in calm weather.
- On July 13, 2022 Netflix released a four-part documentary mini-series entitled D.B. Cooper: Where Are You?! exploring the hijacking incident and exploring the identity of D.B. Cooper.

== Music ==
- The Return of The DB Coopers is the debut album by the DB Coopers, released on 1 July 2026 (catalogue number DBC01).
- The Mountain Goats' song "Rain in Soho" (from the album Goths) references Cooper with the lyric "No one broke D. B. Cooper's fall".
- Kid Rock's song, "Bawitdaba", mentions Cooper in the lyric "..and to D.B. Cooper and the money he took."
- MF Doom's song, "Hoe Cakes", mentions him in the lyric "MF DOOM, he's like D.B. Cooper"
- Glass Beach's song, "Rare Animal", mentions him by name in the pre-chorus, and describes the hijacking in the post-chorus.
- Frank Turner's song, "International Hide And Seek Champions", is a love song with the case of D.B. Cooper as its premise.
- Todd Snider's song, "D.B. Cooper" from the album "Happy to Be Here".

== Other ==
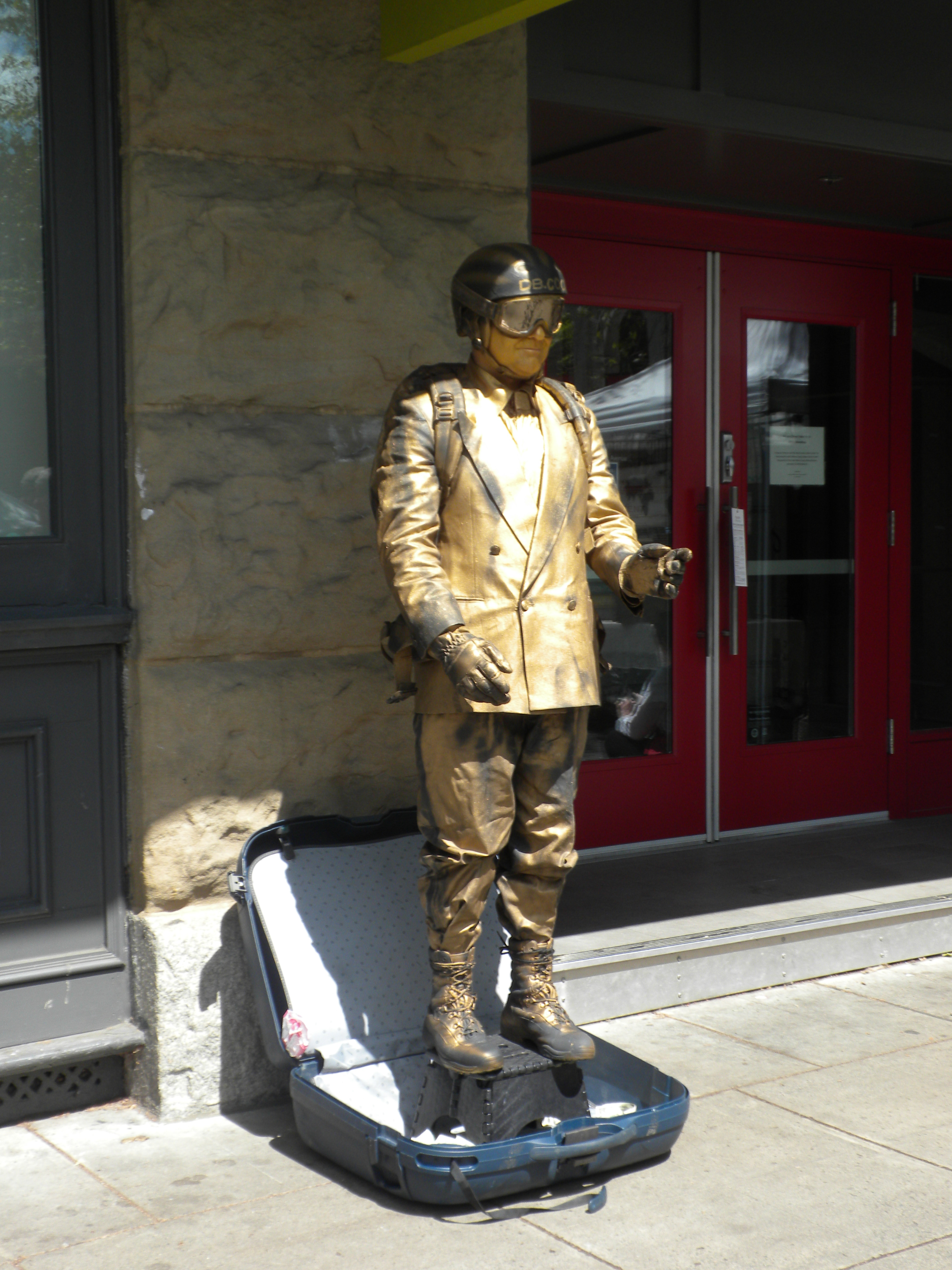
A street artist poses as a "living statue" of Cooper at the Portland Saturday Market in Portland, Oregon

- The community of Ariel, Washington, one of the possible landing areas for Cooper, commemorates the incident with a celebration, held annually on the Saturday following Thanksgiving Day, called "D. B. Cooper Days."
- D. B. Tuber is the name given to Anthony Curcio, who was responsible for one of the most elaborately planned armored car heists in history.
- Fan speculation surrounding the show Mad Men was that there were subtle clues that it would end with Don Draper exposing himself as D.B. Cooper. Producers frequently denied such a plot, and the skyjacking was never depicted in the series.
- Portland Trail Blazers player Dalano Banton was given the nickname "D.B. Hooper" after scoring 20 points in the fourth quarter of a game against the New Orleans Pelicans on November 4, 2024.
