= Sasquatch (disambiguation) =

Sasquatch is another name for Bigfoot, a large, hairy, mythical humanoid creature in North American folklore and popular culture.

Sasquatch may also refer to:

- Sasquatch (band), an American metal band
- Sasquatch (comics), two related superhero characters in Marvel Comics
- Sasquatch (TV series), docuseries on marijuana and bigfoot in Mendocino County, California
- Sasquatch (novel), a 1998 novel by Roland Smith
- Sasquatch (ride), a drop ride at Great Escape amusement park
- Sasquatch! Music Festival, an annual music festival in George, Washington, United States
- Sasquatch (Darkstalkers), a character in Darkstalkers
- Sasquatch, also known as The Untold, a 2002 horror film
- Sneaky Sasquatch, an Apple Arcade game released in 2019 about a Sasquatch living in a campground in Canada
- Sasquatch, a character in the Canadian animated series Animal Mechanicals
