= Peak (novel) =

2007 book by Roland Smith

- Author: Roland Smith
- Cover artist: Francis Floro
- Language: English
- Publisher: Houghton Mifflin Harcourt
- Publication date: September 2007
- Publication place: United States
- Media type: Print
- Pages: 246 paperback
- ISBN: 978-0-15-202417-8
- OCLC: 664404996

Peak is a 2007 young adult fiction novel by Roland Smith about the physical and emotional challenges that a fourteen-year-old faces as he climbs Mount Everest, as well as tall buildings in New York City after moving from Wyoming.

== Reception ==
Peak won the 2007 National Outdoor Book Award (Children's Category). It received a starred review from Publishers Weekly. Kirkus Reviews wrote, "The narrative offers enough of a bumpy ride to satisfy thrill seekers, while Peak’s softer reflective quality lends depth and some—but not too much—emotional resonance".

== Plot ==
The novel opens in New York City, where Peak Marcello is already famous in underground climbing circles for scaling skyscrapers and dangerous urban structures. Peak lives with his mother, Emily, while his father, Josh, is a legendary mountaineer who has largely been absent from his life. Peak’s need for challenge and recognition drives him to illegally climb buildings around the city.

One night, Peak attempts to climb the Woolworth Building. Near the summit, he is caught by police and arrested. Because the stunt receives media attention, Peak faces the possibility of juvenile detention. To avoid a harsher sentence and public embarrassment, Peak’s mother agrees to let Josh take him overseas for several months.

Peak flies to Thailand to reunite with Josh, whom he barely knows. Josh now runs a climbing company that guides wealthy clients on Mount Everest expeditions. Peak quickly realizes that his father is charismatic and adventurous but also self-centered and opportunistic.

From Thailand, Peak travels with Josh’s climbing team into Tibet. Along the way, he meets several important figures, including Sun-Jo, a talented young Sherpa whose father died while working on Everest. Peak and Sun-Jo form a close friendship based on mutual respect and shared skill as climbers.

As the expedition progresses through villages and mountain camps, Peak learns more about Sherpa culture, the dangers of Everest, and the commercialized nature of modern climbing expeditions.

Eventually, Peak discovers Josh’s true motivation for bringing him to Everest. Josh wants Peak to become the youngest person ever to summit Mount Everest. Such an achievement would generate publicity and financial success for Josh’s guiding company.

At first, Peak is excited by the challenge and eager to prove himself. He undergoes training climbs and acclimatization while ascending through the increasingly dangerous camps on the mountain. However, he gradually recognizes how risky the climb truly is. He witnesses altitude sickness, exhaustion, and the physical toll Everest takes on climbers.

Peak also becomes aware that records and fame can distort people’s judgment. Some climbers are motivated more by publicity than by respect for the mountain.

The expedition moves higher through the camps toward the summit. Conditions worsen as oxygen levels decrease and weather becomes more severe. Peak relies heavily on Sun-Jo and the Sherpa climbers, whose work and expertise make the ascent possible.

During the final summit push, Peak realizes that if he reaches the top, he will take the “youngest climber” title away from another teenager. At the same time, Sun-Jo’s family desperately needs the financial reward Josh promised for helping Peak.

Near the summit, Peak makes a critical moral decision. Rather than claim the record and public glory for himself, he allows Sun-Jo to go ahead and technically reach the summit first. This act ensures that Sun-Jo’s family will receive support and demonstrates Peak’s growing maturity and rejection of selfish ambition.

After descending safely, Peak chooses not to exploit the experience for fame. His relationship with Josh remains complicated, but he emerges with a deeper understanding of responsibility, friendship, and personal integrity.

The novel ends with Peak recognizing that climbing is not only about conquering mountains, but also about understanding one’s limits, motivations, and obligations to others. Themes throughout the story include ambition, family conflict, commercialization of adventure, survival, and ethical decision-making under extreme pressure.
