= Andrew Baines =

Australian artist (born 1963)

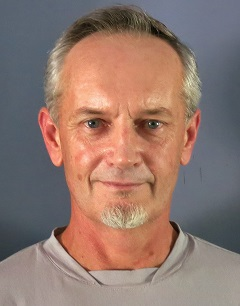
- Born: 1963 (age 62–63); Colchester, England
- Education: South Australian School of Art
- Known for: Painting
- Notable work: The Existentialist; Escape of the Corporate Battery Hens
- Style: Surrealism, modern, conceptual, landscape
- Spouse: Jacqueline Baines (m. 1987–)
- Website: andrewbaines.com/index.html

Andrew Baines (born 1963) is an Australian artist based in Adelaide, South Australia, known for his "quasi-surrealist" paintings of politicians in exposed positions and bowler-hatted office workers on beaches, and "living statues". He does a lot of work for charities, particularly those focussed on the plight of homeless people.

== Early life and education ==
Baines was born in Colchester, England, in 1963, then migrated to South Australia with his parents as an infant.

Baines grew up in the beachside suburb of Grange, spending school holidays at various other coastal places, including Coobowie on the Yorke Peninsula, Rapid Bay, Normanville and Kangaroo Island. His father was a semi-professional soccer player and electrician. His mother was a housewife, who loved painting, reading and music. He has two younger brothers. His mother placed drawing materials in his hands as soon as he could sit up and Baines showed great aptitude, astonishing a kindergarten teacher with his aerial perspective drawing of the area they lived in.

He attended Grange Primary, and attended painting classes at the Henley and Grange Art Society when he was ten years old. Baines became the cartoonist for the Western Suburbs Schools Soccer Newsletter that same year, earning two dollars a cartoon. He was also an unpaid profile artist for the Grange Primary newsletter. By age eleven, he was selling pencil sketches for A$5to teachers and parents at the Grange Primary School.

He then went to Seaton High School, developed a passion for soccer player and worked for John Martin's after finishing school at the age of 16, in 1979. There he produced artwork for the "Magic Cave" and backdrops for window displays, and met his future wife, Jacqueline.

In 1980 and 1981, Baines spent two years at the South Australian School of Art at Underdale, but clashes with his soccer training schedule caused him to drop out and he returned to work at John Martins.

== Career ==
In his twenties Baines discovered the works of Andy Warhol, David Hockney, Pro Hart and Ken Done, and saw the life he wanted.

In 1984, he resigned from John Martins to start Baines Graphics (set up in 1983), producing murals, cartoons, and other artworks for high-profile companies and events, such as BP, the Australian Grand Prix and the South Australia Soccer Federation.

In 1999, he became a full-time painter, on the advice of his wife Jacqueline.

During the 2008 financial crisis, Baines accumulated a lot of debt, and almost found himself homeless.

Baines's work has attracted media attention through his "human sculptures" on coasts around the country, which have parallels with the work of Storm Thorgerson, known for his Pink Floyd album covers.

Baines' work is represented by many major commercial galleries and is held in many collections across Australia and abroad, but as of July 2022 Baines his work has not made it into the Art Gallery of South Australia. A solo exhibition, The Search for Sanity, is mounted by BMGArt in July–August 2022.

As of July 2022, Baines lives and works in Grange, with his wife Jacqueline.

== Art practice and works ==
Baines describes himself as a "quasi-surrealist painter and installation artist". He particularly admires the work of Andy Warhol, David Hockney, Ken Done, Pro Hart and Jeffrey Smart.

He has put Alexander Downer in a red door on the beach; Natasha Stott Despoja, Steven Marshall and Kirsten Alexander, mayor of the City of Charles Sturt in full mayoral gown and gold chains, in the sea, drinking tea; two dozen leaders of various faiths holding hands along the water's edge, including both the Anglican and Catholic Archbishops; arranged for the West Australian Symphony Orchestra to play a symphony in the sea; put a herd of cows in the Indian Ocean; stood former prime minister of Australia Malcolm Turnbull and over 100 suited volunteers holding umbrellas aloft in the dawn surf at Bondi Beach, then replicated this with former Western Australian premier Colin Barnett and suited volunteers at Cottesloe Beach; seated twelve suited volunteers on toilets reading papers along the water's edge, including Australian politician, Amanda Vanstone; and provided brightly coloured sheep to the SA branch of the United Nations Association of Australia "to mark the International Year of Family Farming".

Since 2005, he has created dozens of installations on Australian beaches, collaborating with Hills Hoist, West Australian Symphony Orchestra, Adelaide Symphony Orchestra, Leigh Warren Dance Company, Holstein Australia, the Western Australian State Gallery, Anglicare, Flinders Medical Centre Foundation and Wirra Wirra Vineyards. Volunteer subjects have included Sir James and Lady Hardy, and Sir Eric and Lady Neal, among many others.

Busselton Bovines (February 2011) involved placing five Holstein Friesian cattle in the sea at Busselton. It came about when Baines was approached by representatives of the national Dairy Innovators' Forum at a gallery opening in Perth. A few local dairies agreed to take on the challenge of introducing their cows to the sea. Two months later the cows stood happily in the shallows, long enough for photographs to be taken. Local media embraced the event and news of the installation went global.

Post Modern Backyard (May 2011) involved transporting eight full size Hills Hoists to Bondi Beach from Adelaide, and have them erected. Hills loved the concept and organised two professional erectors and eight Hills hoists to be in place at 5 am on Bondi beach.

In Waiting for the Bus (September 2012) one hundred "bowler hat-wearing, classic 'Englishmen'" lined up along Henley Beach and struggled to read the newspaper in the wind.

The Coalition of the Constipated (August 2012) at Henley Beach was a political statement, made to highlight the need for toilet facilities at the popular beach. Amanda Vanstone and radio personality, Bob Francis, were involved in the installation. Vanstone had purchased his paintings, for herself and the Australian Embassy in Rome, when she was Ambassador, and Baines had painted Bob Francis' portrait as an entry in the Archibald Prize competition. Soho Galleries Sydney described it as his "most famous installation/photo shoot ... a guerrilla protest that featured 12 suited people sitting on toilets reading papers, on the water's edge at Henley".

Doorways to Potential (January 2013) was a fundraiser, developed to raise awareness for non-profit charity Common Ground Adelaide, which provides assistance and aid to homeless people in the area. Local men, including former politician Alexander Downer, contributed A$1,500 each to the charity to participate, dressing in suits and bowler hats and gathering together on the beach, as a symbol of the possibilities that the future holds.

Sea of Knowledge (February 2014) gathered people aged in their 70s, 80s and 90s on Henley Beach for a photoshoot to "portray their lives, roles and sea of knowledge in a bid to challenge the stereotypes of ageing".

=== Commissions ===
Amongst others, Baines has been commissioned to paint a book cover for Surf Life Saving in S.A., a wine label painting for Wirra Wirra Vineyard, a CD cover painting for ABC Classics, featuring the Adelaide Symphony Orchestra's Principal tuba player Peter Whish-Wilson, and the cover for Steven Ogden's book I Met God in Bermuda.

He cites his favourite commission as a portrait of John Dawkins, former Liberal member of the South Australian Legislative Council, which hangs in Parliament House, Adelaide.

In January 2023, after being commissioned by Lutheran Care to create a work of art that would highlight the plight of homeless people in Adelaide, Baines created a "living art installation" featuring seven well-known South Australians covered in gold paint, as living statues in Rundle Mall in the Adelaide central business district. Baines chose gold as a mark of irony, as it is associated with wealth. The subjects represented various forms of homelessness experienced by a variety of people, played by AFLW player Erin Phillips; Adelaide Fringe director Heather Croall; Kaurna elder Uncle Mickey O'Brien; Human Services Minister Nat Cook; and former A-League striker Bruce Djite.

== Other activities ==
Baines was appointed as an art advisor to the United Nations, and as of July 2022 is working on a project about micro-plastics in the ocean, for Harmony Day. He commits himself to two charities per year, in particular those which assist the homeless. He has imagined the concept of statues of homeless "trolley women" in the city, with QR code that lead to the stories of their lives.

== Film, video and TV ==
A 2009 episode of Landline features Baines's interest in painting cows.

Ash Starkey uploaded a three-minute screener to YouTube in 2010, which contains scenes from a half-hour documentary, Edge of Nothingness, that he made about Baines.

In 2013, Photography Life released a one-minute time lapse film on Vimeo of Baines setting up his installation, Doorways to Potential, on Henley Beach in South Australia.

Anna Creoddity released a short film (2014) on YouTube called Art Day! Andrew Baines, in which she shows and discusses his art work.

In 2014, Baines, Aaron Schuppan and Carlo Petraccaro, produced a short film called Escape of the Corporate Battery Hens, which shows many South Australian identities in unguarded moments, including Amanda Vanstone, Steven Marshall, Vickie Chapman and Kirsten Alexander, former mayor of the City of Charles Sturt. The film, along with a short documentary, The Existentialist, about Baines' philosophy on life and art, were screened at The Arts Theatre in Angas Street, Adelaide, on 18 January 2015.

== Awards ==
As of 2022 Baines has not yet won a major art prize, but has been a finalist in several, including:

- Adelaide Cathedral Art Prize, SA (2006)
- Adelaide Fringe Festival Poster Competition, SA (2006)
- Corangamarah Art Prize, Vic (2008)
- Cromwell's Art Prize, NSW (2004)
- Doug Moran National Portrait Prize, NSW (2004 & 2006; semi-finalist, 2013)
- Fleurieu Art Prize (2004, 2006 & 2008)
- Gray Mast Art Prize, SA (2004)
- Heysen Prize for Landscape, SA (2005)
- Maritime Art Awards, Vic (2009)
- Mortimore Art Prize for Surrealism, NSW (2012)
- Nora Heysen Art Prize for Still Life, SA (2011)
- Spirit of the Outback, Qld (2005)
- Waterhouse Natural History Art Prize, SA (2004, 2006 & 2007)
- Whyalla Art Prize, SA (2007 & 2009)

== Collections ==
Baines' work is held in various collections, including:

- University of Adelaide
- Advertiser Newspapers
- ANZ Bank, Singapore
- Australian Embassy, Rome, Italy
- National Dairies
- Nichi Engineering, Malaysia
- Roseworthy College
- St Aloysius College
- St Hilda's Anglican School for Girls
- State Emergency Service South Australia
- Smorgan Collection
- Wirra Wirra Winery, South Australia

== Exhibitions ==
His paintings have been exhibited in many private galleries, including

- Accent Fine Art, NSW
- Accent Fine Art, WA
- Adelaide Hilton International Gallery, SA
- Art Images Gallery, SA
- Aviva Fine Art Gallery, Vic
- Axia Modern, Vic
- Bay Discovery Gallery, SA
- BMG Art, SA
- Framed the Darwin Gallery, NT
- Gallows Gallery, WA
- Glenn Gallery, SA
- Greenaway Gallery, Vic
- Greenhill Galleries, SA
- Greenwood Gallery, Vic
- Harrison Galleries, NSW
- Hester Gallery, NSW
- Jahroc Gallery, WA
- Jenny Pihan Fine Art, Vic
- Lombard Art Gallery, SA
- Lynne Wilton Gallery, Vic
- Maree Mizon Gallery, NSW
- Monsoon Gallery, WA
- Paint Box Fine Art, ACT
- Pilbara Fine Art Gallery, WA
- Pivotal Gallery, Vic
- Raglan Gallery, NSW
- Red Dot Gallery, SA
- Redhill Gallery, Qld
- Rembar Gallery, Vic
- Richard Martin Gallery, NSW
- Rushcutters Bay Gallery, NSW
- Stafford Studios of Fine Art, WA
- Xanadu Gallery, WA
- Shayne Gallery, Montreal, Canada
- Karin Weber Gallery, Hong Kong
- International Surrealism Now, Lisbon, Portugal
- Artery Gallery, St Andrews, Scotland
- Red Sea Gallery, Singapore
- Galerie TOAAC Switzerland
- Dart Gallery Devon, England
- Blackheath Gallery, England
- Susan Street Fine Art Gallery, California, USA
- Gallery Diamante, California, USA
- Joanne Coia Gallery, Florida, USA

== Publications ==
Baines is listed in the Lexikon der phantastischen Künstler.

His paintings have appeared in such publications as ArtSlant New York, and Glow Magazine.
