= The Pursuit of D. B. Cooper =

1981 film by Roger Spottiswoode

- Theatrical release poster
- Directed by: Roger Spottiswoode
- Screenplay by: Jeffrey Alan Fiskin
- Based on: Free Fall: A Novel by J.D. Reed
- Produced by: Daniel Wigutow; Michael Taylor
- Starring: Robert Duvall; Treat Williams; Kathryn Harrold; Paul Gleason; R.G. Armstrong
- Cinematography: Harry Stradling Jr.; Charles F. Wheeler
- Edited by: Allan Jacobs; Robbe Roberts
- Music by: James Horner
- Production company: PolyGram Pictures
- Distributed by: Universal Pictures
- Release date: November 13, 1981
- Running time: 100 minutes
- Country: United States
- Language: English
- Budget: $14 million
- Box office: $3.7 million

The Pursuit of D. B. Cooper is a 1981 American crime thriller comedy film about infamous aircraft hijacker D. B. Cooper, who escaped with $200,000 after leaping from the back of a Boeing 727 airliner on November 24, 1971. The bulk of the film fictionalizes Cooper's escape after he landed on the ground.

== Plot ==
On a clear day in 1971, the hijacker identified as D.B. Cooper jumps from an airliner by using the rear exit, parachuting into a forest in Washington State. The man is later identified as Jim Meade, a military veteran with big dreams. Meade escapes the manhunt using a Jeep that he had previously hidden in the forest and concealing the money that he has stolen in the carcass of a deer. He meets his estranged wife Hannah, who operates a river rafting company. Meade is being hunted by Bill Gruen, an insurance investigator who was Meade's army sergeant, and Meade's army buddy Remson, who remembered Meade talking about hijacking an aircraft.

Gruen confronts the Meades at the rafting company, but they escape down the river. The Meades lead Gruen and Remson on a cross-country chase involving various stolen cars. Gruen is fired by his employer but continues the chase to claim the money for himself. At the aircraft boneyard near Tucson, Arizona, the Meades acquire a hot-air balloon, but Gruen steals the money from Hannah. Meade chases him with a barely functional Boeing-Stearman PT-17 cropduster biplane. Meade runs Gruen off the road but crashes his aircraft.

Recovering from the wrecks, Meade has Gruen's gun and for a few minutes, they discuss how Gruen knew that Meade was D. B. Cooper. Along with clues that he had left, the previous encounters between the two men in the army had convinced Gruen that only Meade could have managed the audacious hijacking.

Meade leaves Gruen with a few bundles of the cash and walks away with the rest, to be picked up by Hannah. With Gruen abandoning the pursuit, Remson must try to recover the stolen money. When he reaches a crossroads that the Meades have just passed, Remson sees what he thinks is their truck parked nearby and continues the chase, but the truck turns out to have just been a look-alike; as the credits roll, Meade and Hannah are seen to be still traveling down the road in the far distance.

== Cast ==
- Robert Duvall as Sgt. Bill Gruen
- Treat Williams as D.B. Cooper/Jim Meade
- Kathryn Harrold as Hannah Meade
- Ed Flanders as Brigadier Meade
- Paul Gleason as Remson
- R. G. Armstrong as Dempsey
- Dorothy Fielding as Denise
- Nicolas Coster as Avery
- Cooper Huckabee as Homer
- Howard K. Smith as himself
- Christopher Curry as Hippie

== Production ==
The Pursuit of D. B. Cooper was based on American poet J.D. Reed's 1980 novel Free Fall: A Novel.

Jeffrey Alan Fiskin wrote the original script. Robert Mulligan was the initial director, but he was allegedly fired because it took him seven days to shoot the whitewater rapids chase.

Director John Frankenheimer also worked on the film, but he was replaced by Buzz Kulik after shooting one sequence, and Kulik finished the film. W.D. Richter worked on the script uncredited, as only Jeffrey Allan Fiskin was awarded credit.

The producers then asked editor-director Roger Spottiswoode to shoot a major new stunt and edit the film. Spottiswoode argued that the film was "doomed" unless he could shoot new sequences, to be written by Ron Shelton, who would be credited as an associate producer. The Spottiswood-Shelton scenes comprise approximately 70% of the finished film.

According to one writer, the new team "added new characters - a rural rogue's gallery of scam artists - and an end-of-the-hippie era feeling. Even when editing the existing material, the new writer and director changed the film thematically, dramatically, cinematically."

The Kulik film was a "banal, dour Vietnam vet docudrama" in which Meade concocts the scheme to escape postwar malaise and becomes upset when he wins the acclaim as a hijacker that had eluded him as a veteran. The Shelton-Spotiswoode film was more of a chase comedy "about a man who returns home and plans to get himself the easy money that's part of the American dream for him and for all the low-lifes he meets along the way (including a Nam comrade who returns to haunt Meade like a comic Javert)."

Kathryn Harrold later said: "It was a little tricky knowing what was going to happen without a script".

To generate publicity for the film, Universal Pictures offered a million-dollar reward for any information that would lead to the capture and arrest of the real D.B. Cooper, but no one ever claimed the money. (Note: The Pursuit of D. B. Cooper includes many inaccuracies; for example, D. B. Cooper is shown jumping during daylight hours with clear weather, but the real Cooper jumped during the night during heavy rain.)

=== Aircraft in the film ===
A Boeing 727-173C (c/n 19504–527, N690WA) leased from World Airways was used in the film as the hijacked Northwest Orient Airlines Boeing 727. Painted in the fictitious Northern Pacific company livery, it appears in the first scene, photographed by pilot Clay Lacy from his Learjet. Four professional parachutists performed the jump from the rear exit stairs of the Boeing 727.

Other aircraft in the film included wrecks found at Davis–Monthan Air Force Base, including twin-engine and four-engine propeller aircraft such as the Douglas C-47 Skytrain, Lockheed P2V Neptune, Lockheed C-121 Constellation and Douglas C-54 Skymaster. Numerous Sikorsky H-34 and Sikorsky CH-37 Mojave helicopters were also featured. A Boeing-Stearman PT-17 (s/n 41 25304, N56949) flown by Art Scholl was used in the climatic car-aircraft chase in the film.

== Soundtrack ==
The musical score includes the song "Shine," written and sung by Waylon Jennings and also released on Jennings' 1982 album Black on Black. A soundtrack album was released by Polydor Records (PD-1-6344) consisting mostly of country songs.

Track listing

No.	Title	Writer(s)	Artist	Length
1.	"Shine"	Jennings	Waylon Jennings	2:49
2.	"Maybe He Knows About You"	Enid Levine	Rita Coolidge	2:40
3.	"Bittersweet Love"	Enid Levine	Jessi Colter	3:15
4.	"Money"	John Sebastian	Rita Coolidge	3:42
5.	"Wyoming Bound"	James Horner	James Horner (conductor)	1:37
6.	"Silk Dresses"	Michael Smotherman	The Marshall Tucker Band	3:15
7.	"Money" (Instrumental)	Enid Levine	James Horner (conductor)	2:45
8.	"You Were Never There"	Michael Smotherman	Waylon Jennings and Jessi Colter	3:38
9.	"White Water"	James Horner	James Horner (conductor)	4:11
10.	"Shine (Bluegrass Version)"	Waylon Jennings	Waylon Jennings	2:35
Total length:				30:27

== Reception ==
The Pursuit of D. B. Cooper, although similar to other hijacking films of the period, was not a success at the box office. In a critical review of the film, Vincent Canby of The New York Times noted that "a number of excellent actors (were coerced) into performing what is a dismally unfunny chase-comedy that eventually seems as aimless, shortsighted and cheerlessly cute as the character they've made up and called 'D.B. Cooper'."

In 1982, original director John Frankenheimer described the film as "... probably my worst-ever experience. A key member in the chain of command had been lying to both management and myself with the result that we all thought we were making a different movie."

Roger Spottiswoode won the Special Jury Prize at the 1982 Cognac Festival du Film Policier.

== See also ==
- D. B. Cooper in popular culture
