= Tentacles (novel) =

2009 novel by Roland Smith

- First edition cover
- Author: Roland Smith
- Cover artist: Phil Falco
- Language: English
- Series: Cryptid Hunters
- Genre: Adventure
- Publisher: Scholastic
- Publication date: October 2009
- Publication place: United States
- Media type: Print
- Pages: 319 (first edition, paperback)
- ISBN: 978-0-545-16688-1
- OCLC: 310398669
- Preceded by: Cryptid Hunters
- Followed by: Chupacabra

Tentacles is a 2009 young adult novel by Roland Smith. It is the sequel to Smith's 2005 novel Cryptid Hunters, and was followed by Chupacabra in 2013.

== Plot ==
Grace and Marty are preparing to join Wolfe, Grace's father and Marty's uncle, on a trip to New Zealand aboard the ship Coelacanth to try and capture a giant squid. They are joined by Marty's best friend Luther. Their trip is moved up due to fear that Noah Blackwood, Grace's grandfather, will attempt to sabotage them. Blackwood sends Butch McCall, one of his henchmen, to sneak onto the ship.

After setting sail, Grace spends much of her time overseeing the unhatched Mokélé-mbembé eggs also on board while Marty learns how to use a flying robot called a dragonspy and managing the kitchen. When the Mokélé-mbembé eggs hatch, one of the creatures bites Luther and imprints on him. Butch lies about his credentials and finds a position working with a squid researcher.

When they arrive in waters off New Zealand, Butch tries to push Marty overboard, but he is rescued by Theo, an incompetent member of the crew. Theo reveals himself to be Ted Bronson, Wolfe's genius partner. Ted reveals he has designed a submarine to help catch a giant squid. Blackwood shows up on a ship of his own, planning to attack the Coelacanth then stage a rescue.

Marty, Ted, and a squid scientist go into the ocean in Ted's submarine and successfully lure a live giant squid back to the Coelacanth. While they are underwater, Blackwood attacks the ship. He steals the young Mokélé-mbembé and threatens to kill people if Grace doesn't go with him, so she agrees. Luther sneaks the dragonspy into her pocket so they can communicate.

== Publication ==
Tentacles was first published in 2009 by Scholastic. It was translated into German by Birgit Niehaus in 2013.

== Reception ==
Jane Hendriksen Baird writing for School Library Journal calls Tentacles a "high octane page-turner that will reel readers in and keep them riveted". A review in Horn Book Guide says some elements are "absurd".
