= Thunder Cave =

1995 book by Roland Smith

- First edition
- Author: Roland Smith
- Language: English
- Genre: Young adult fiction
- Publisher: Hyperion Books
- Publication date: 1995
- Publication place: United States
- Media type: Print (Paperback)
- Followed by: Jaguar

Thunder Cave is a young adult adventure novel by Roland Smith, first published by Hyperion Books in 1995. It is the first of three books, being followed by Jaguar and The Last Lobo.

== Plot summary ==
After his mother dies in a car accident, fourteen-year-old Jacob Lansa embarks on a journey across the globe to Kenya to find his father. On his journey he meets a Masai named Supeet and Stionik whose goal is to bring the long rains. Supeet believes that Jacob is in Kenya for other reasons than to find his father, which bides true after an accident that could end the chance to bring the long rains.

== Reception ==
Thunder Cave was reviewed for Booklist by Kathy Weisman, who likened it to Gary Paulsen's novels. Weisman wrote, "Although the novel is longer than most for this age group, the action never flags, and Smith's focus on local color and vivid attention to detail will make readers feel they are participants in Jacob's experiences."

The audiobook adaptation was reviewed by Anna Rich. "The strong plot lends itself to reading aloud, and [Johnny] Heller's easy narrative style enhances both characters and storyline."
