= Elephant Run =

2007 novel by Roland Smith

- First edition cover
- Author: Roland Smith
- Language: English
- Genre: Young Adult Historical Fiction
- Publisher: Hyperion Books
- Publication date: 25 September 2007
- Publication place: United States
- Media type: Print Hardback/Paperback
- Pages: 318 pp
- ISBN: 978-1-4231-0402-5
- OCLC: 124031729
- LC Class: PZ7.S657655 El 2007

Elephant Run is a young adult historical novel by Roland Smith, first published in 2007. It takes place mainly in Burma in the midst of World War II. The main character is Nicholas Freestone, a 14-year-old boy, tamed and simple, who is sent to live by his mother with his father on the family teak plantation, which requires toughness and strength, to escape the bombing in London. When the Japanese invade Burma, they take over the plantation, sending Nick's father, Jackson Theodore Freestone III, to a prison camp. Leaving Nick to escape and try to save his father with the help of some friends and with the danger of some enemies.

Elephant Run was chosen as one of the ALA Best Books for Young Adults in 2009. and received several nominations for book awards.

== Plot summary ==
Nicholas Gillis Freestone is sent to Burma after his mother's apartment is destroyed in or the Battle of Britain. He meets Nang the foreman, his daughter Mya, and his son Indaw, a mahout. At the time of Nick's arrival, there is much talk about the recent Japanese bombing of Rangoon, predicting the British defenses in Burma will soon fall. The next day Nick is at the village and Hannibal, a koongyi (timber elephant) with a grudge against tiger Nats (spirits of the forest), attacks Nick and his ribs are cracked. Out of embarrassment, Nick keeps the incident to himself until his father hears of the accident from Hilltop (Taung Baw in Burmese), a monk who was one of the two original mahouts to come with Nick's great-grandfather, Sergeant-Major Jackson Theodore Freestone I, who founded Hawk's Nest. Hilltop is Mya & Indaw's great-grandfather, who some people rumor is over 100 years old. Hilltop is said to know the secret language of the elephants. Rumor says he lives in the forest and disappeared for sixty years before returning to the Freestone Plantation.

On Christmas, Nick, his father, Indaw, and Mya are traveling to the nearby Freestone Island when the Japanese invade. Japanese soldiers soon overrun and capture the Freestones' camp, taking into custody all its inhabitants while Nick and the elephants go into a safe hiding place. Not long after, though, Nick is captured by an amiable soldier, Sergeant Sonji, whom Nick initially takes to be crazy. Sonji takes an interest in Nick, teaching him to create haiku and treating him relatively well for a Japanese sergeant of the time. Nick is returned to the elephant village by the sergeant, at which point the brutal extent to which the Japanese are taking in their conquest becomes clear. Under the newly erected Japanese flag lie the corpses of Nang, who has been beaten to death, and Captain Josephs, a British officer who has been decapitated. His father and Indaw have been taken as POWs (prisoners of war), and Nick is taken a hostage at Hawk's Nest. He remains there for ten months as a servant of sorts to Colonel Nagayoshi, the Japanese commander of Hawk's Nest. While there, Nick is routinely beaten by a crippled elderly Japanese sympathizer named Bukong but is otherwise left unscathed by the Japanese.

Later, Nick gets a letter from his father saying he was transported from a camp for British and Australian prisoners in Singapore to one in Burma. One night Hilltop shows a secret passage that was in the house to Nick and Mya. Everyone later believes that they escaped when they were actually in the tunnel. From then on Hilltop shows the passages that link to Hawk's Nest. On their escape day, Nick and Mya disguise themselves as novice monks and escape Hawk's Nest with Hilltop and Hannibal. In a nearby village, they are trapped by Captain Moto who wants to find and catch the infamous thief Kya Lei (Tiger's Breath), a Burmese Robin Hood. The next day Hilltop writes a letter saying that he was at the prison camp and would be back. Kya Lei helps Nick and Mya to get to the first camp. Each day, they progress closer to Jackson and Indaw. When Hilltop returns he tells Nick and Mya that he talked to Indaw while he was at the prison camp and planned an escape. The day of his escape was on the festival day, a day where the Japanese soldiers buy goods for themselves. Because the guards were distracted by the festival, Indaw was able to escape. Later that day, Jackson faked his death and was able to escape, with the help of Sergeant Sonji.

The group trek into the jungle but are caught by Captain Moto, Bukong, and Japanese sympathizers. However, Hannibal attacks them, due to the presence of tiger skins on Moto's jeep, and the group is liberated by Bernard and Kachin scouts, who parachuted in to destroy the airfield at Hawk's Nest. Hilltop elects to stay behind, and not go with the group because he feels responsible for Hannibal and loves Burma.

The book fast forwards to 1945, where the Freestones have moved to the Australian Bush and opened a cattle ranch. Nick Freestone and Mya became a couple, his stepfather and mother are happy and, Jackson Freestone, Hilltop, and Hannibal are in good terms. And most especially, the Land of Burma belongs to the Burmese again.

== Reception ==
A Kirkus Reviews review read, "It's the thrilling adventure tale Smith is known for, strong on plot and setting, and though the beginning is an uneasy mix of story and information, the tale soon rolls".
