= Cryptid Hunters =

2005 novel by Roland Smith

- First edition cover
- Author: Roland Smith
- Cover artist: Gail Doobinin
- Language: English
- Series: Cryptid Hunters
- Genre: Adventure
- Publisher: Hyperion Books
- Publication date: February 2005
- Publication place: United States
- Media type: Print
- Pages: 352
- ISBN: 978-0-7868-5161-4
- OCLC: 54843703
- LC Class: PZ7.S65766 Cr 2005
- Followed by: Tentacles

Cryptid Hunters is a 2005 young adult novel by Roland Smith. It follows thirteen-year-old twins Grace and Marty O'Hara after their parents go missing in a helicopter accident and they are sent to live with their uncle, who searches for cryptids. It is the first of four novels in a series and received mixed reviews from critics.

== Plot ==
Grace and Marty O'Hara, thirteen-year-old twins attending a private school in Switzerland, learn their parents have gone missing in the Amazon rainforest. They are sent to live with their uncle, Wolfe, on an island off the coast of Washington state. Wolfe is a veterinarian who uses his personal wealth to search for cryptids. When the twins arrive on the island, they are joined by a cultural anthropologist, Laurel Lee, who was rescued off of a kayak near the island and has come to give Wolfe what she claims is the egg of Mokélé-mbembé. She stole the egg back from Noah Blackwood after she had given it to one of their research labs and they claimed that had lost it. Noah Blackwood is Wolfe's rival and a poacher who pretends to be a conservationist.

Wolfe and Laurel plan to go to the Congo Basin and search for Mokélé-mbembé and send Grace and Marty back to Switzerland. However, the children fall out of the plane taking them back to school, and land in the Congo, along with a dog named PD, short for Pocket Dog, and a bonobo named Bo. They make their way to the place Wolfe stayed during a previous expedition, called the Skyhouse, while Wolfe and Laurel try to make their way there as well. While at the Skyhouse, they are attacked by Butch McCall, one of Blackwood's henchmen, and he kidnaps Grace.

Using old journals at the Skyhouse, Marty discovers Grace is not his twin, but actually the daughter of Wolfe and Blackwood's daughter Rose. Grace escapes and makes her way back to Marty, and they follow a parrot through the forest to the nest of a dead Mokélé-mbembé. They find two eggs in the nest and take them back to the Skyhouse. Blackwood shows up and tries to convince Grace to go with him, but Marty threatens to destroy the eggs and he leaves. They go back to the island with the eggs to try and incubate them.

== Publication ==
Cryptid Hunters was first published as a hardcover book in February 2005 by Hyperion Books (ISBN 978-0-7868-5161-4). (Note: Original publishing month is as referenced by published reviews. Some of the distributor websites such as Amazon, Barnes & Noble have posted a release date as early as December 27, 2004. The publisher, Hyperion Books, has also been referred to as Disney-Hyperion, and Hyperion Books for Children.) A trade paperback was released by Hyperion in 2006. (Note: Amazon posted a release date of March 21, 2006, while Barnes & Noble and Goodreads.com posted a release date of April 1, 2006.) A school edition was released in 2005 by Scholastic (ISBN 978-0-439-79811-2), and a library binding was released in 2006 by Turtleback Books. It was also released as an audiobook in 2006.

== Reception ==
Cryptid Hunters won the following awards:

- 2007 Nevada Young Readers Award winner, Intermediate Category, Nevada Library Association.
- 2007-2008 Mark Twain Readers Award - 3rd Place, Missouri Association of School Librarians.
- 2009-2010 Young Hoosier Book Award, Middle Grades category, Indiana Library Federation.

Cryptid Hunters received mixed reviews from critics. A Booklist review calls the plot a "well-paced jungle adventure" and School Library Journal and Bulletin of the Center for Children's Books both comment positively on the characters of Grace and Marty. Kirkus calls the story "appropriately cheesy" but found the stereotypes "a bit much". A review in Publishers Weekly finds the small role cryptids actually play in the story frustrating, and says the "unsatisfying journey is less about cryptids than it is about soap opera-esque family intrigue".
