= Jaguar (novel) =

1997 novel by Roland Smith

- First edition
- Author: Roland Smith
- Language: English
- Genre: Young adult fiction
- Publisher: Hyperion Books
- Publication date: 1997
- Publication place: United States of America
- Media type: Print (Paperback)
- Preceded by: Thunder Cave
- Followed by: The Last Lobo

Jaguar is a young adult adventure novel by Roland Smith, first published by Hyperion Books in 1997. It is the sequel to the book Thunder Cave.

== Plot summary ==
Fourteen-year-old Jake is forced to be left to live at a retirement home in Poughkeepsie, New York while his father, Dr. Robert Lansa, travels to help his friend Bill set up a jaguar preserve. Doc, as everyone calls him, takes longer than expected in Brazil and sets up a plane ride for Jake to visit during his Spring Break. When he arrived in Manaus, Jake met Buzz, the expedition's pilot who is supposed to track jaguars at the preserve. Jake meets Doc but is angry with him for not arriving home, not keeping in touch, and not meeting him at the airport. A couple mornings later, Bill is working on the boat they received, and Buzz, Doc, and Jake are heading outside when the boat explodes. This explosion kills Bill, injured Buzz's leg, and injured Doc's arm. At first, the expedition is called off, but Silver, a skipper who lives in his boat nearby, offers his boat. At first, the expedition declines, but they decide that Jake could be the pilot and they could take the boat up the Amazon. Flanna, the expedition's botanist, goes with Doc to Brasilia to get the exploration permit changed. Meanwhile, Buzz teaches Jake how to fly the Morpho, a small ultralight plane. One night, Jake goes into Silver's boat and while looking at some of Silver's books, he is attacked by a man with a scar on his face and knocked out. Jake keeps this a secret between himself and Silver. When Doc and Flanna return, Doc, Flanna, Silver, and Jake get ready for the trip up the Amazon.

Silver is the captain of his boat, named the Tito. Silver secretly knows about the man with the scar and encourages everyone to keep a shotgun nearby on the boat. The boat breaks down and they must stop at a village while Silver finds a mechanic there. This is a miserable shantytown with an Indian camp nearby and a gold mine that has small claims from virtually everyone in the shantytown. Jake sees the man with the scar through binoculars and runs to warn Silver. Soon Jake finds Silver and Doc is worried and finds Jake. Then, Doc learns of a jaguar that comes to the town every night and "vandalizes" the town. There is a betting pool for whoever gets the weight of it right when it is caught. Doc meets with the Indian, Raul, who helps him tranquilize the jaguar under the conditions that he gets to come on the expedition to see it let go and that it gets weighed. Doc agrees and they successfully capture the jaguar, get it weighed, and quickly leave the village. Raul wins the betting pool and donates the money to his camp before he leaves.

The expedition continues until Silver wants to go up a tributary that he said might lead to the center of the preserve. Doc, Flanna, and Jake agree not knowing that he would try to look for the Lost Mines of Muribeca. They try to turn around but the reverse control malfunctions so they continue up the narrow tributary. They find a beautiful lake at the end of the tributary and set up camp there. For several weeks, Doc and Raul tag animals while Flanna studies the plants. Jake tracks the tagged animals using the Morpho. Meanwhile, Silver takes trips out into the rain forest by himself and looks for the lost mines. Things are going well until Doc and Raul take a week-long trip to the rain forest and Silver disappears. Doc returns without Raul and is extremely sick with malaria. Jake lands from one of his flights and Tyler ( the man with the scar) and Fred, who threatened Jake and Doc at the shantytown are both behind him. Tyler holds an automatic rifle and ties up Flanna and Jake. Since Doc can't move, they leave him in the tent. After Fred disobeys Tyler, Fred is shot. Tyler asks Jake and Flanna about Silver, but they don't have any information. Jake is able to deceive Tyler after Tyler wants to know how the tracking equipment worked in order to track down Silver. Jake gives Tyler the frequency for a jaguar's collar and Tyler sets out. Doc comes and untieds Flanna and Jake, afterwards, Jake flies off to find Silver. He purposely crashes into the canopy and finds Silver nearby. Silver talks with Jake and Silver indicates he found the Lost Mines of Muribeca but that he did not want to steal from the natives. They rescue Raul, captured by the isolated Indian camp and they trap Tyler using the killed jaguar's collar. He falls into a pit and after a brawl with Raul and Jake, Silver has to drop his gun and step back. Jake is ordered to sit down by Silver and is almost killed but Flanna shoots Tyler with a compound bow. The night before they would leave the lake and find another place to set up camp, Woolcott, the one who is willing to fund the preserve, along with Buzz, lands in a very nice floatable private plane. He accepts the preserve and Jake flies back to Poughkeepsie, New York for a few more weeks of high school and a trip with his grandfather, Taw, to Arizona while Flanna and Doc stay to run the preserve.

== Reception ==
Kirkus Reviews called the book, "A first-rate adventure about greed, mutual dependence, and family".
