= Living statue =

Street performance & arts installations

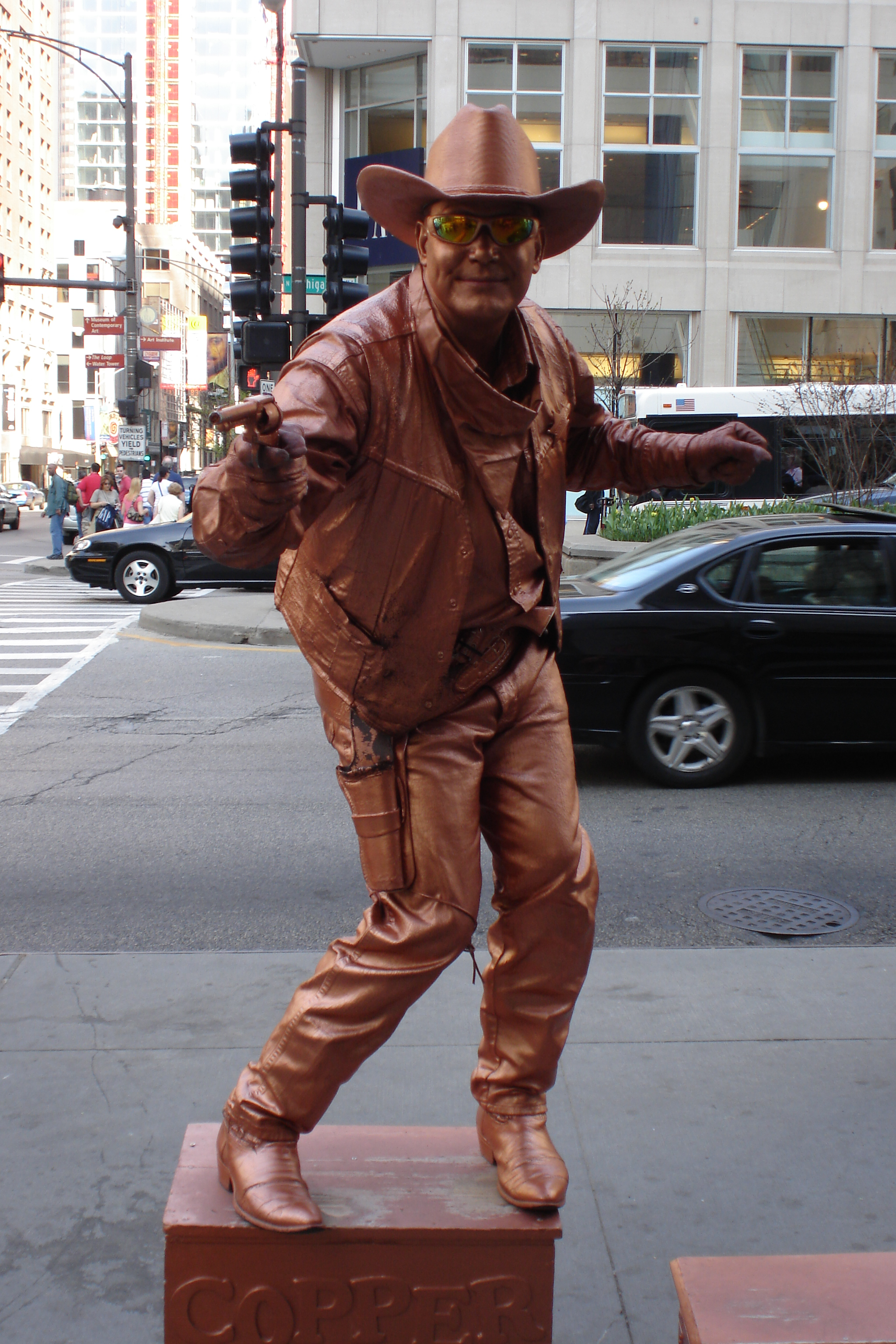
"The Copper Cowboy", a living statue performer in Chicago

A living statue, also known as a human statue, usually refers to a performer who poses as a statue or mannequin, usually with realistic statue-like makeup.

Living statue may also refer to art installations created by an artist using living people, or other works created by a performing artist.

== History ==
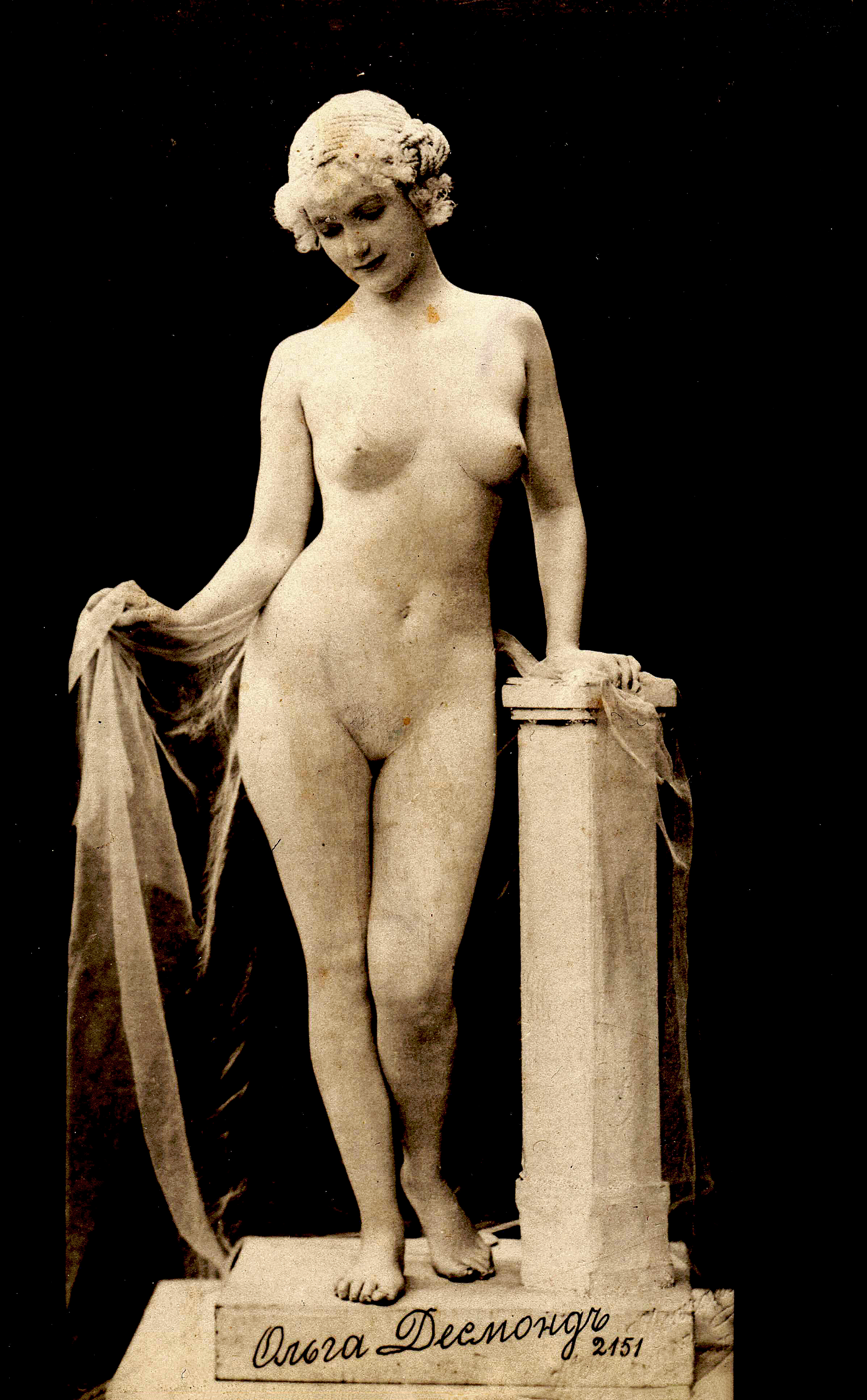
Olga Desmond nude with drapery and pedestal

The tableau vivant, or group of living statues, was a regular feature of medieval and Renaissance festivities and pageantry, such as royal entries by rulers into cities. Typically a group enacting a scene would be mounted on an elaborate stand decorated to look like a monument, placed on the route of the procession.

By a quirk of English law, nudity on the stage was not permitted unless the performers remained motionless while the stage curtains were open. In the early years of the 20th century, performers took advantage of this exception to stage "plastic representations", as they were sometimes called, centring on nudity. The most persistent performer in this line was the German dancer Olga Desmond, who later put on "Evenings of Beauty" (Schönheitsabende) in Germany, in which she posed nude in imitation of classical works of art ("living pictures"). The English tradition continued until English law was changed in the 1960s.

A living statue appeared in a scene of the 1945 French film Les enfants du paradis (Children of Paradise). The London-based artists Gilbert and George created living statues in the 1960s.

== Contemporary use ==
Contemporary performances are commonly on-the-street busking but may also be at events where the artist is paid. A living statue attraction, as a performance, is the artist's ability to stand motionless and occasionally come to life to comic or startling effect. These performers, also known as human statues, are often completely covered in paint, often gold or silver in colour.

Australian artist Andrew Baines is known for his artworks using living people, often used to convey a social message.

Mark Jenkins street installation camouflaging a sculpture as a living statue in Barcelona

In 2008 the American artist Mark Jenkins placed The Golden Ass, a sculpture posed as a living statue, among the living-statue street performers on a tourist street in Barcelona, where it collected coins from passersby.

Phil Genoux was one of the earliest known artists to do living statue as street performance, starting in London in 1988. Here he is featured on possibly the first current affairs TV footage of living statue as street performance ever aired, on Amsterdam TV in 1989.

== Events ==
Since 1996, the annual World Statues Festival is held in Arnhem, Netherlands, initially under the name "Rijnfestijn", now World Living Statues and Statues by Night.

Since 2000, the University of Business and Social Sciences in Buenos Aires, Argentina has hosted a National Contest of Living Statues.

Since 2011, the International Festival of Living Statues has been hosted by Masca Theatre in Bucharest, Romania, where there is a focus on developing the form through artistic research.

The first completely Living Statues Festival started in the city of Espinho, Portugal, in 1997.

== Gallery ==
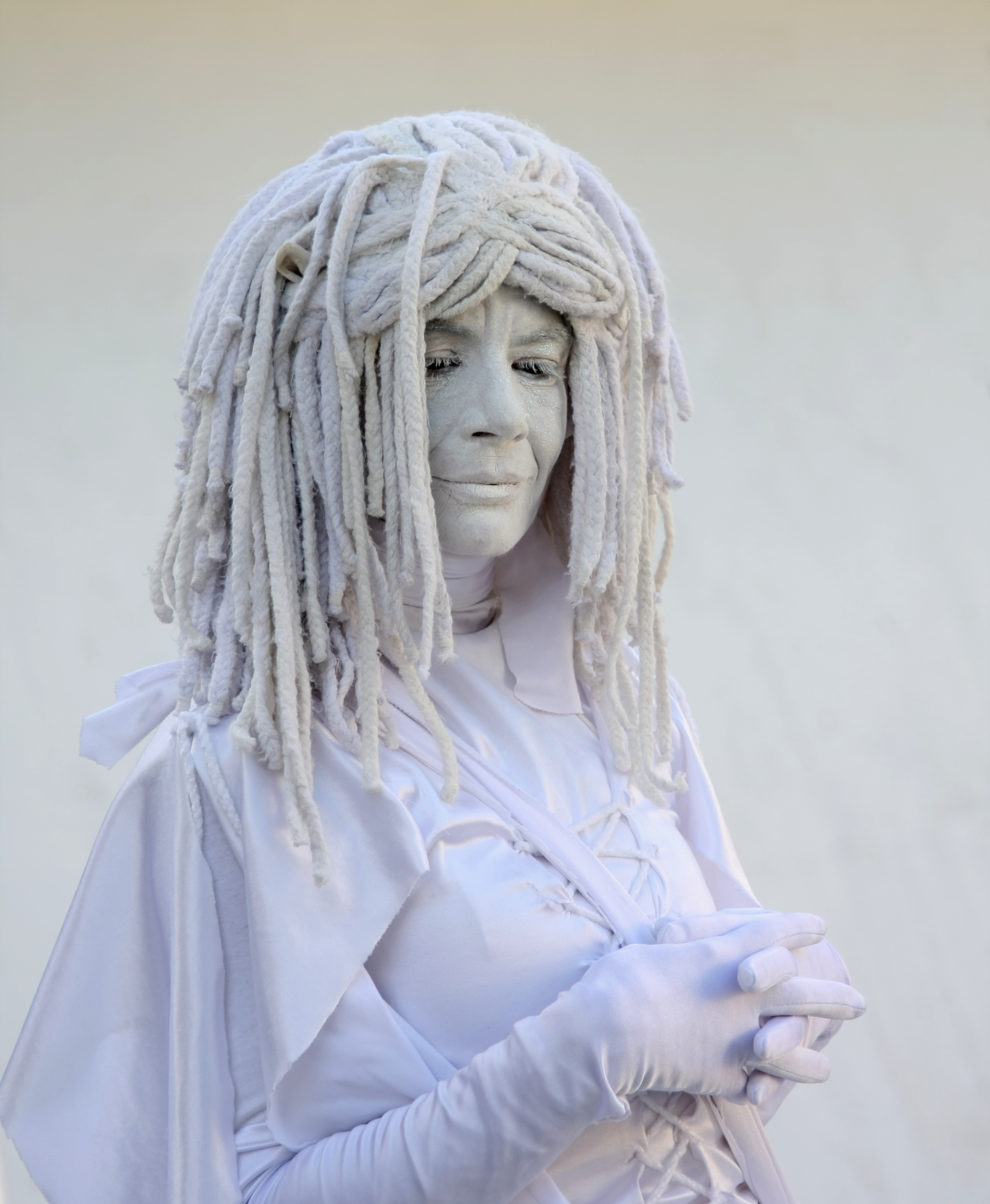
Miami Beach, Florida

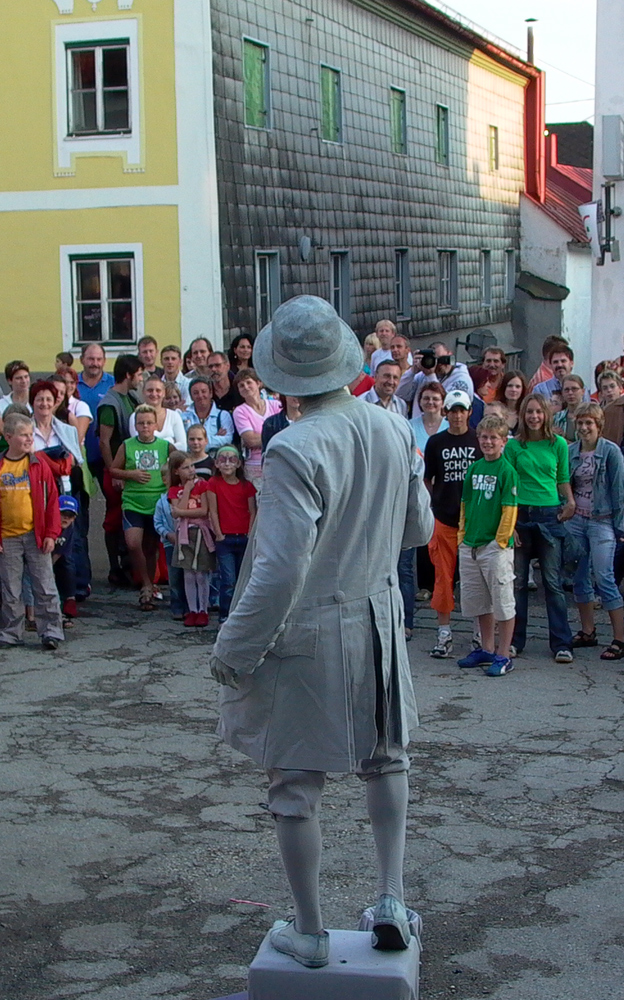
A Living Statue "Stillman Theater" draws a fascinated crowd

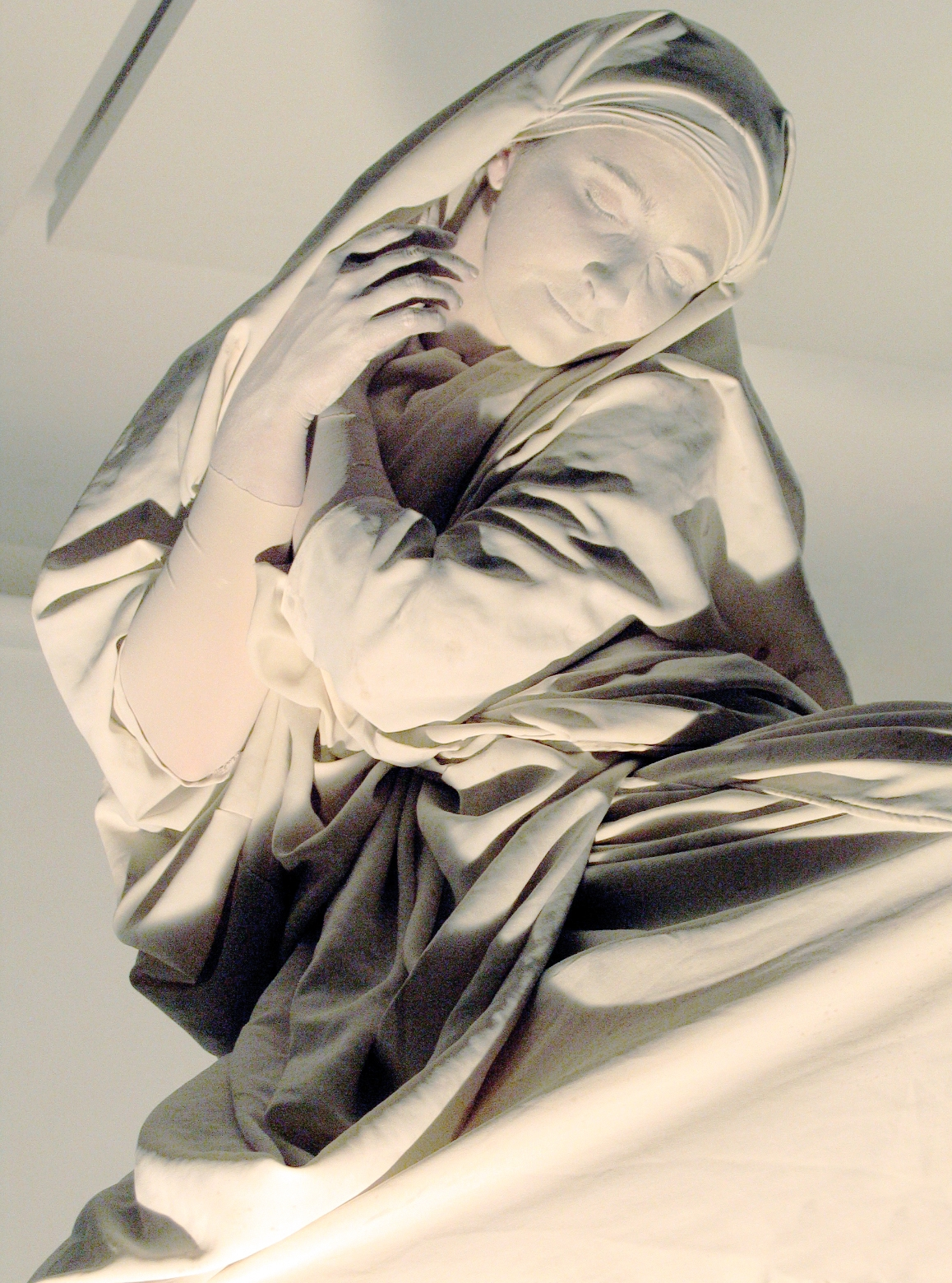
"Sophie Malraye, Statue Vivante", World Champion 2006 in Arnhem. Paris, France

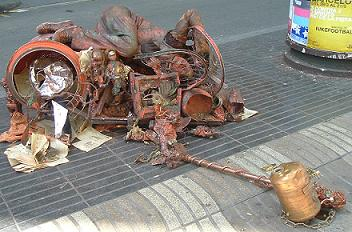
Barcelona, Spain

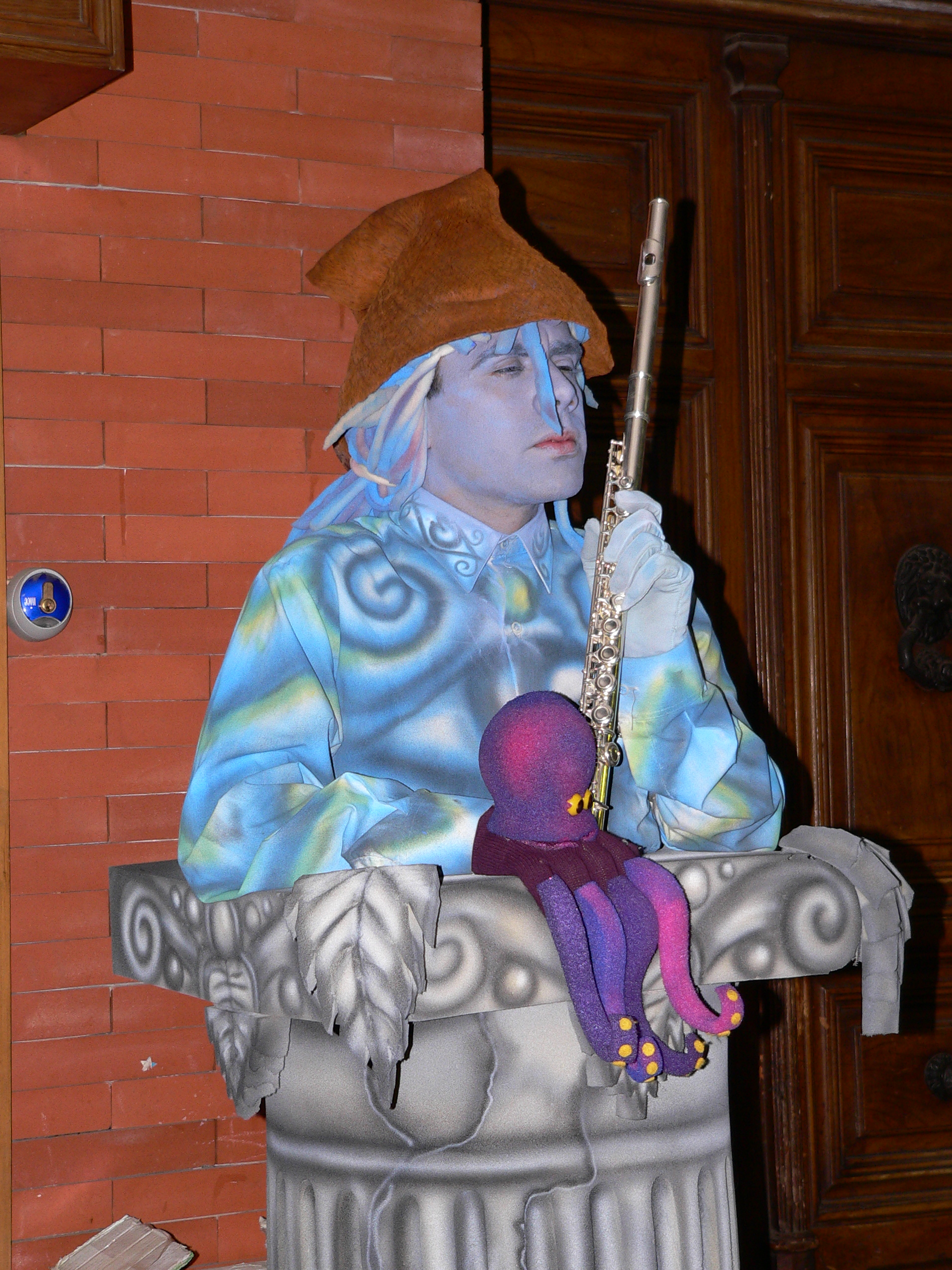
Alcalá de Henares, Spain

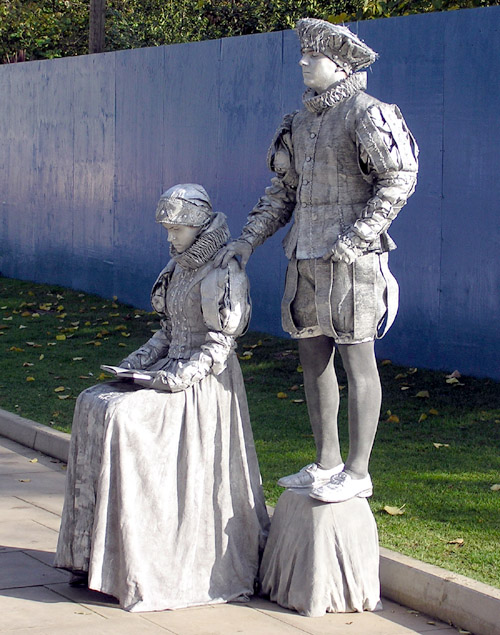
Jubilee Gardens, London

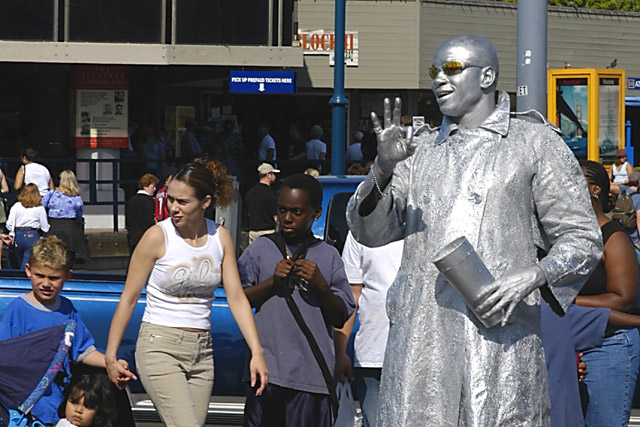
"Silver man" at Fisherman's Wharf, San Francisco

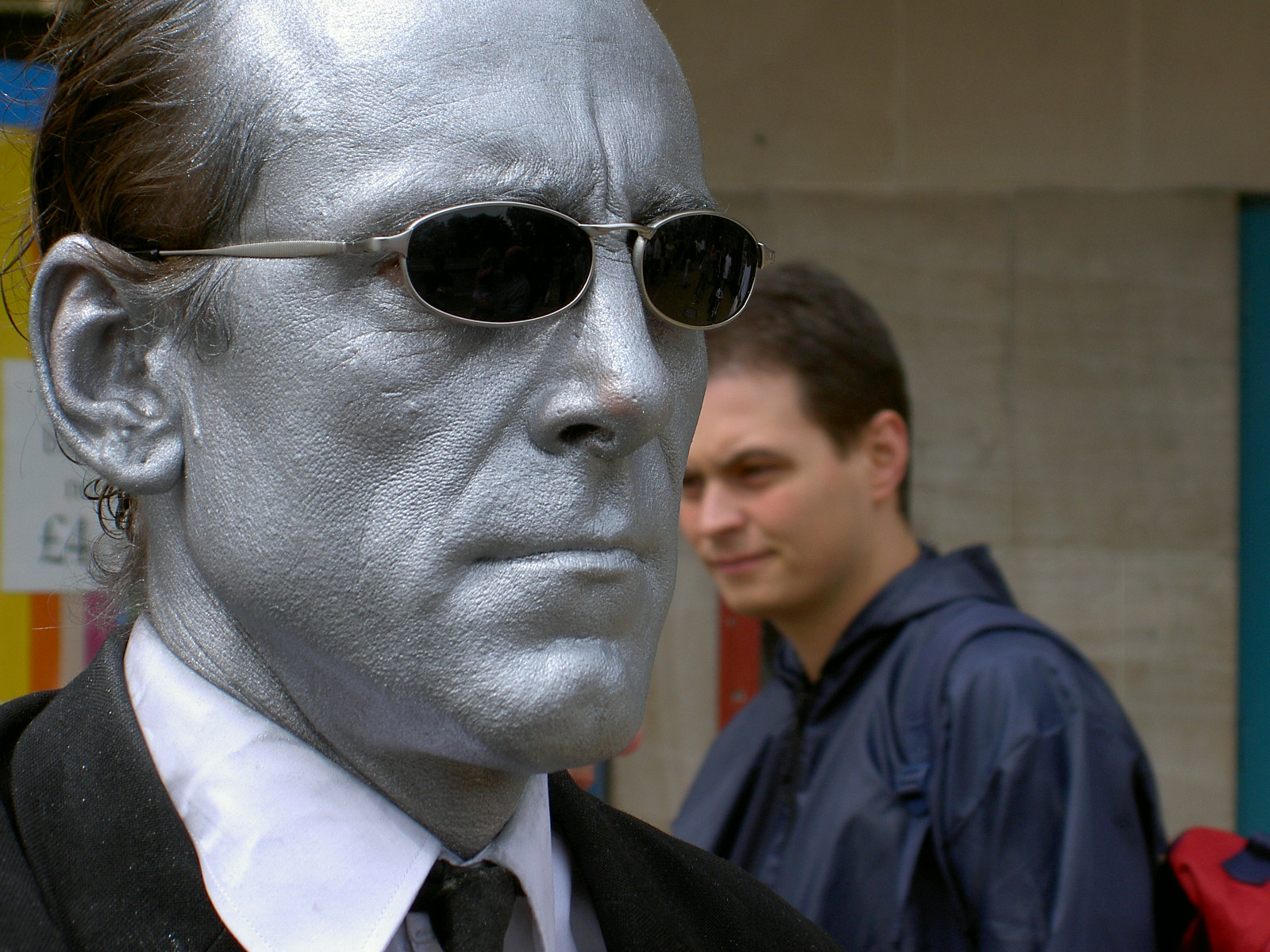
Street performer spray painted silver in Edinburgh

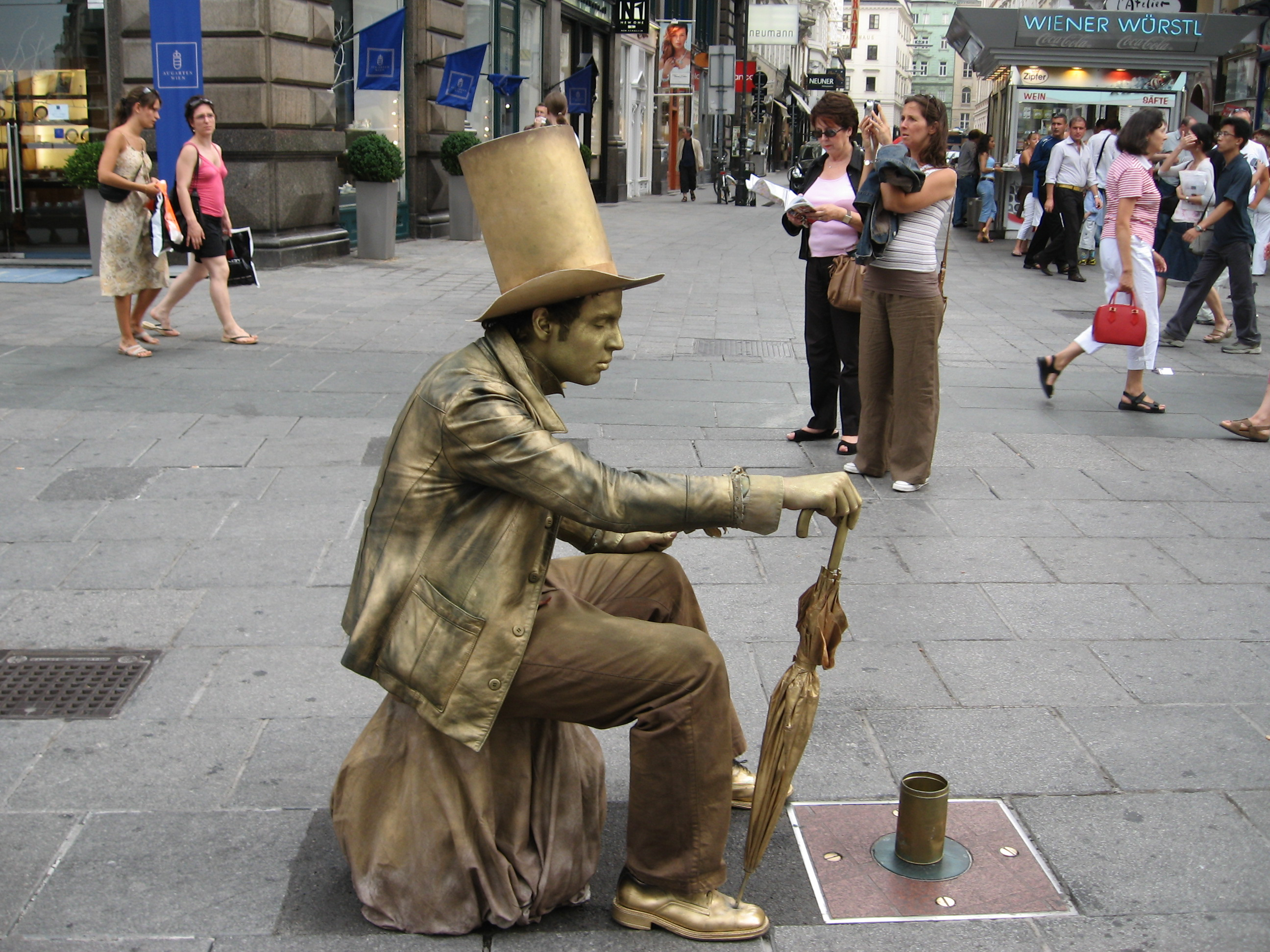
Vienna, Austria

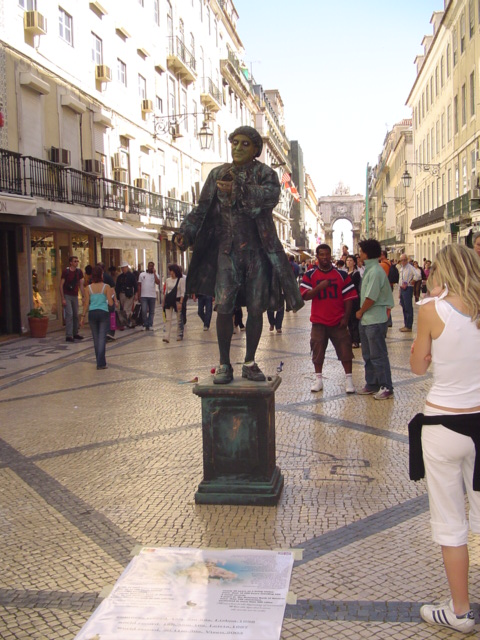
Lisbon, Portugal

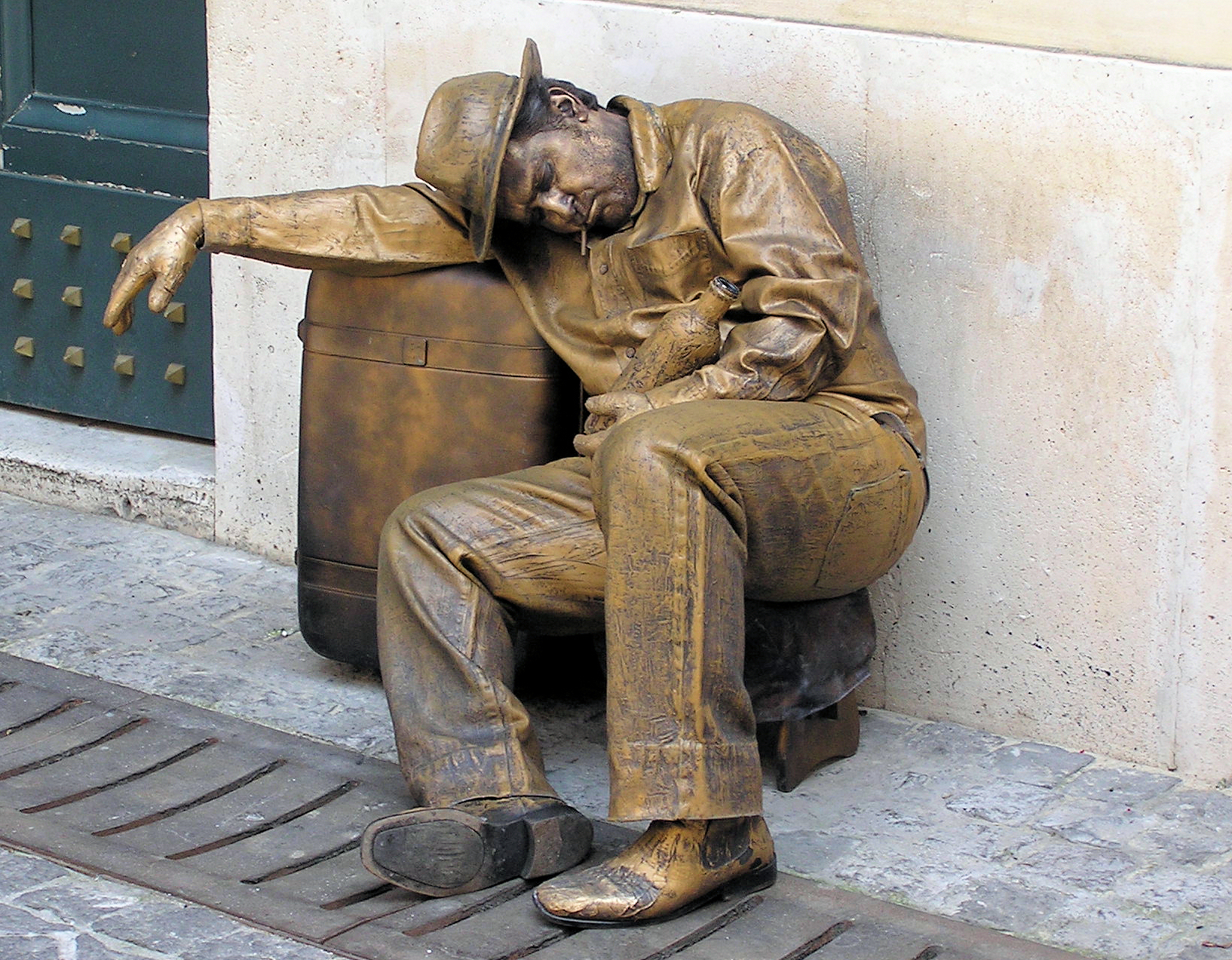
Rome, Italy

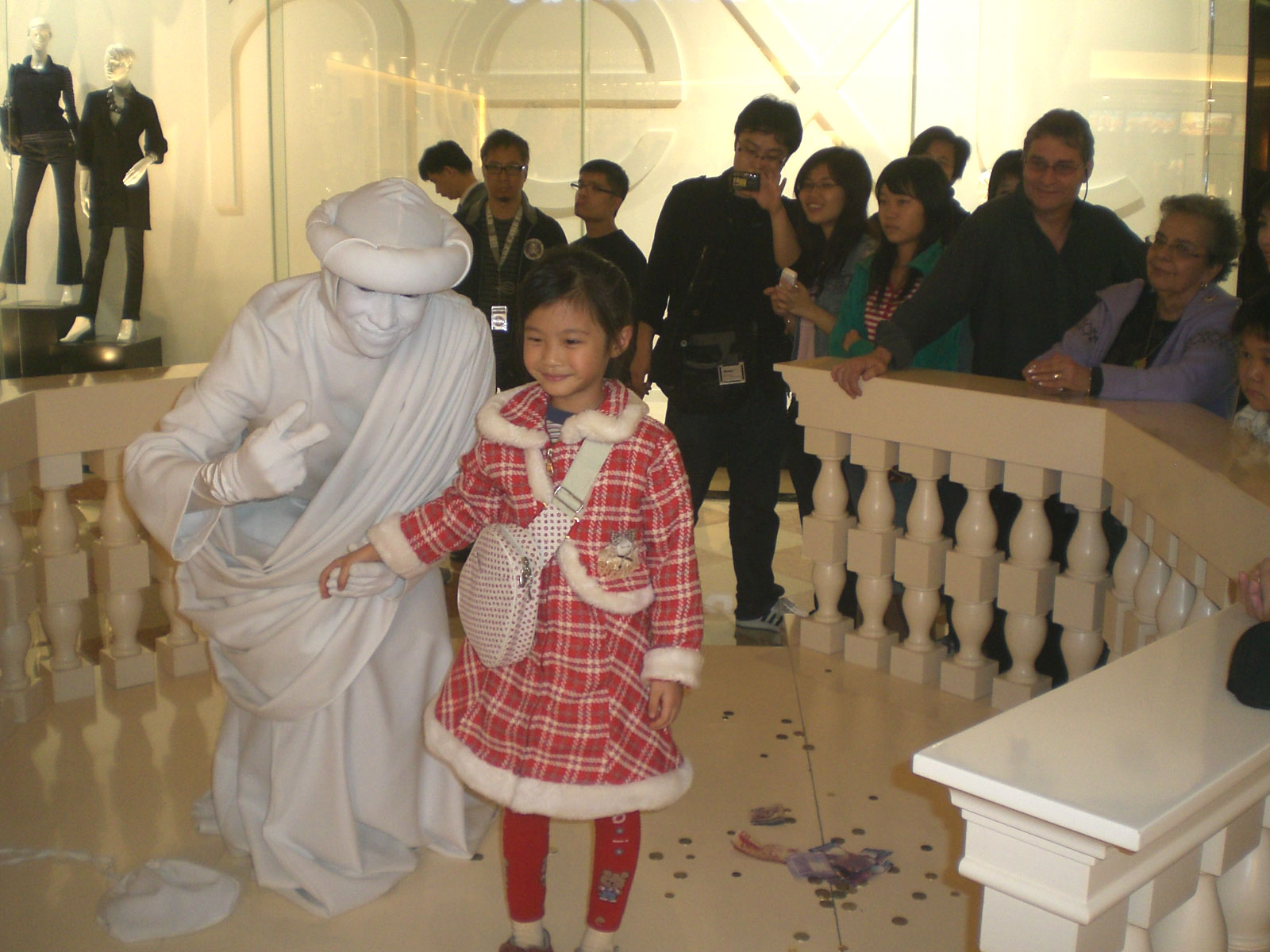
The Venetian Macao, Macau

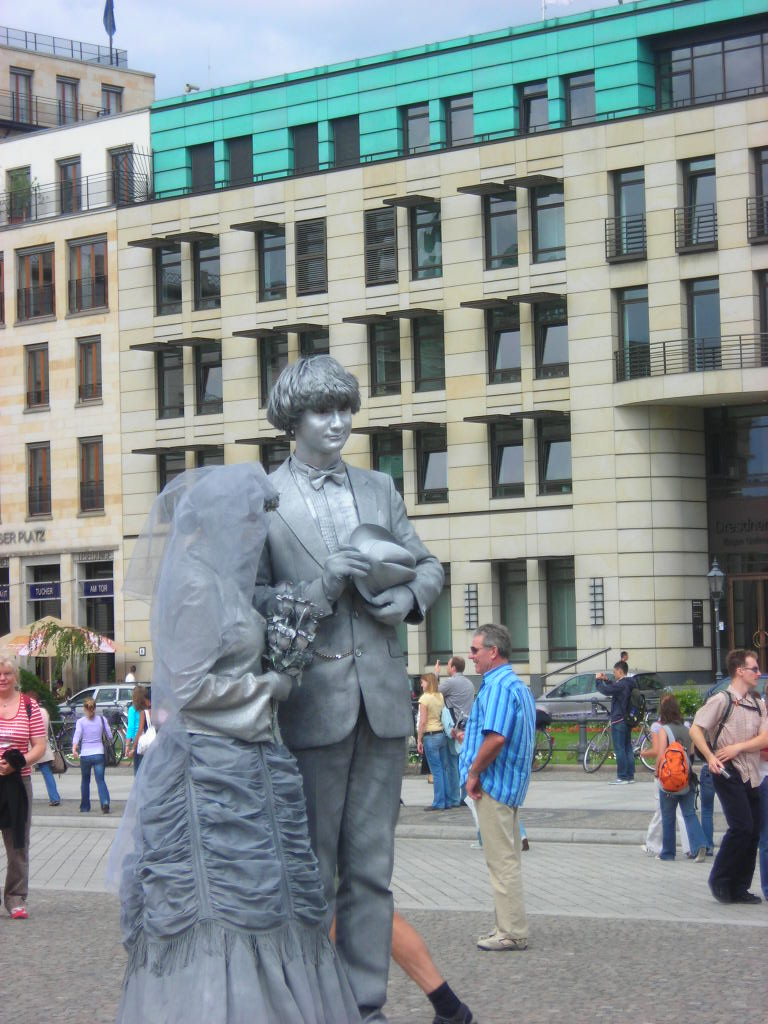
Pariser Platz, Berlin

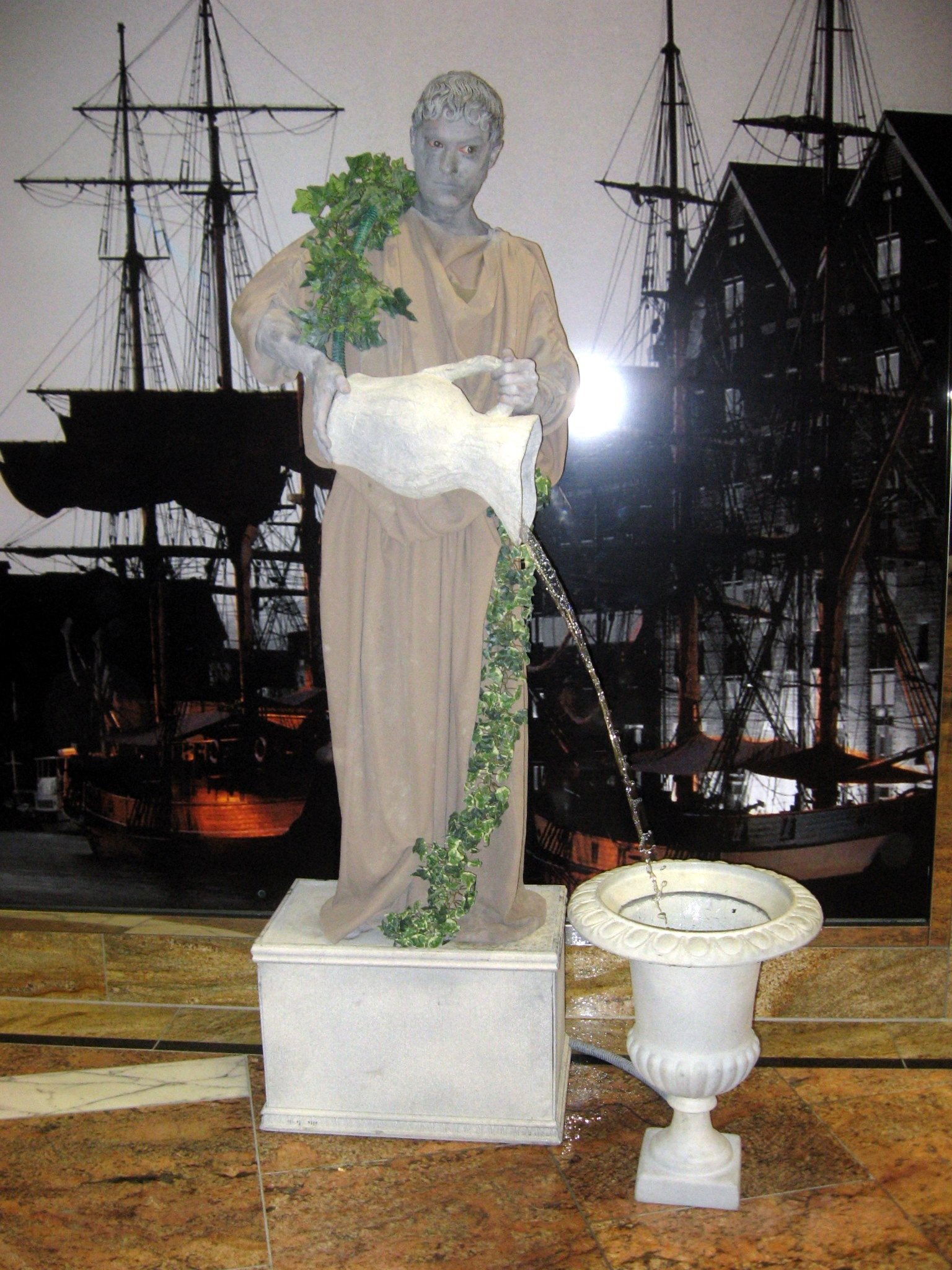
Gloucester, England

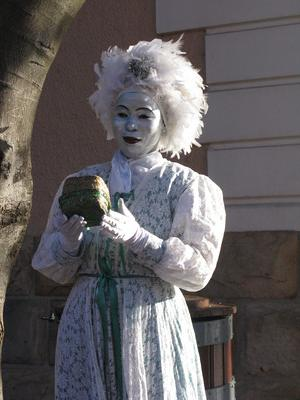
Fairy, Victoria & Alfred Waterfront, Cape Town, South Africa

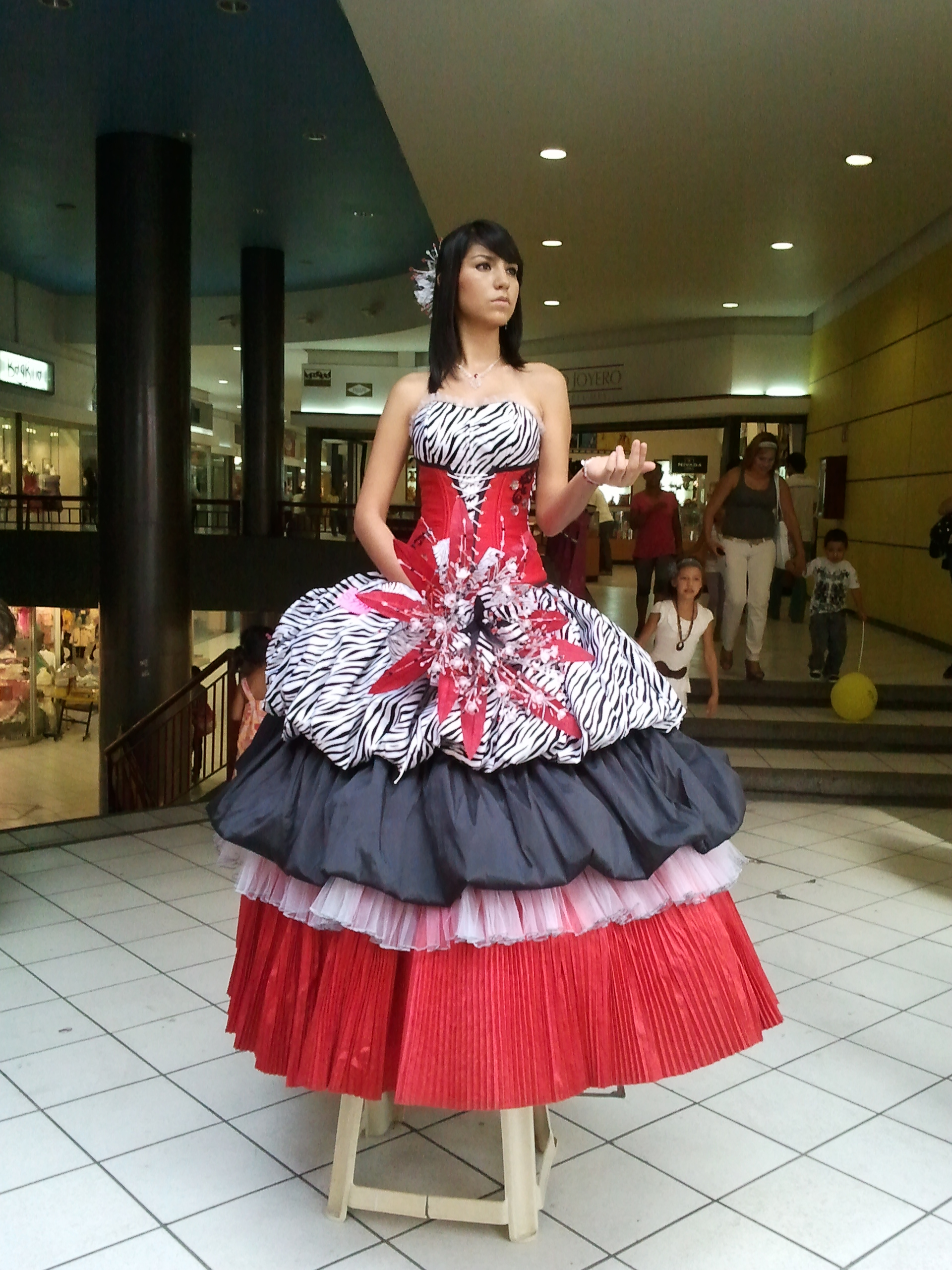
A Living Statue seen in the Downtown of Leon, Mexico

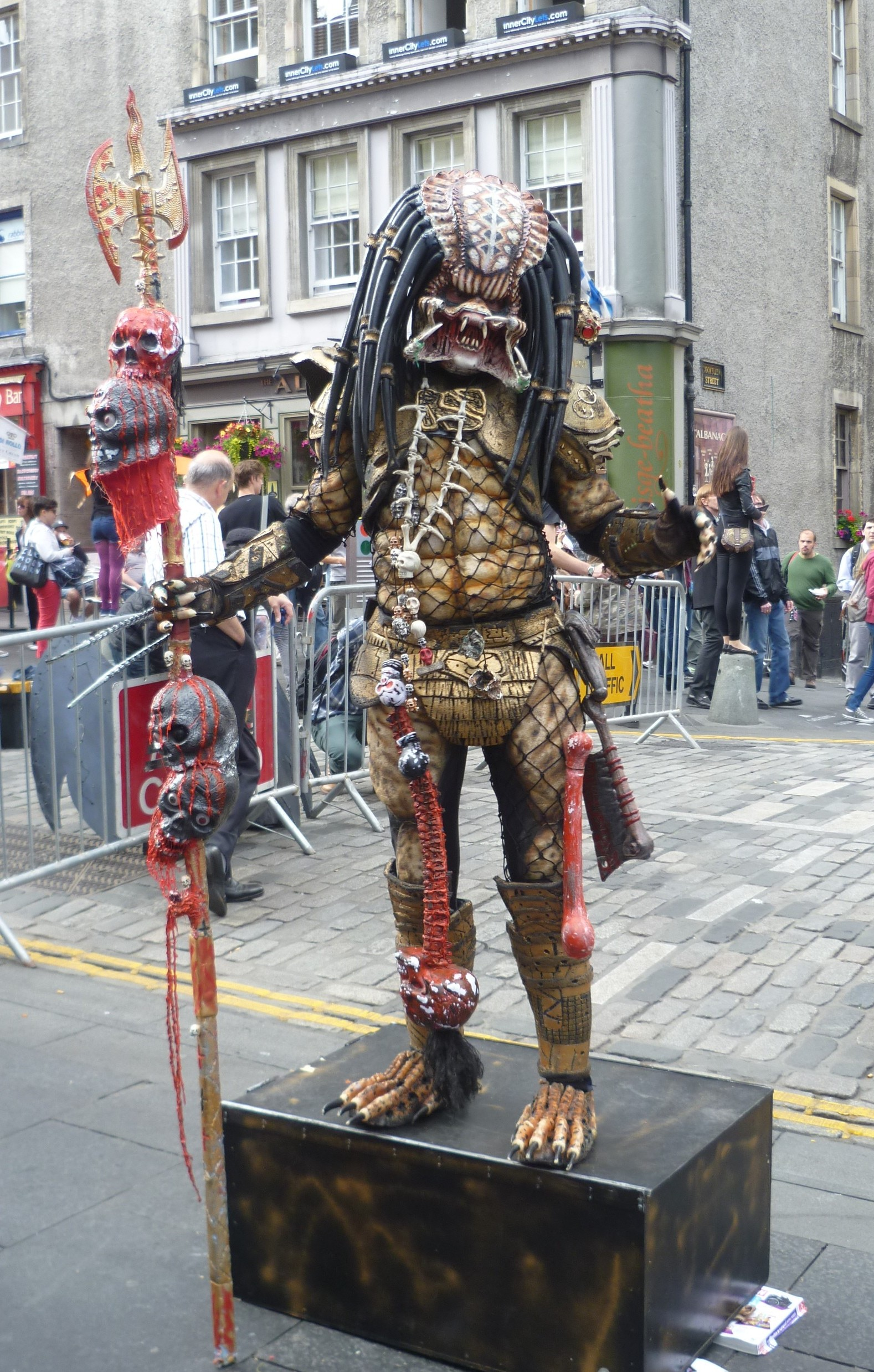
Living statue of a Predator in Edinburgh, Scotland

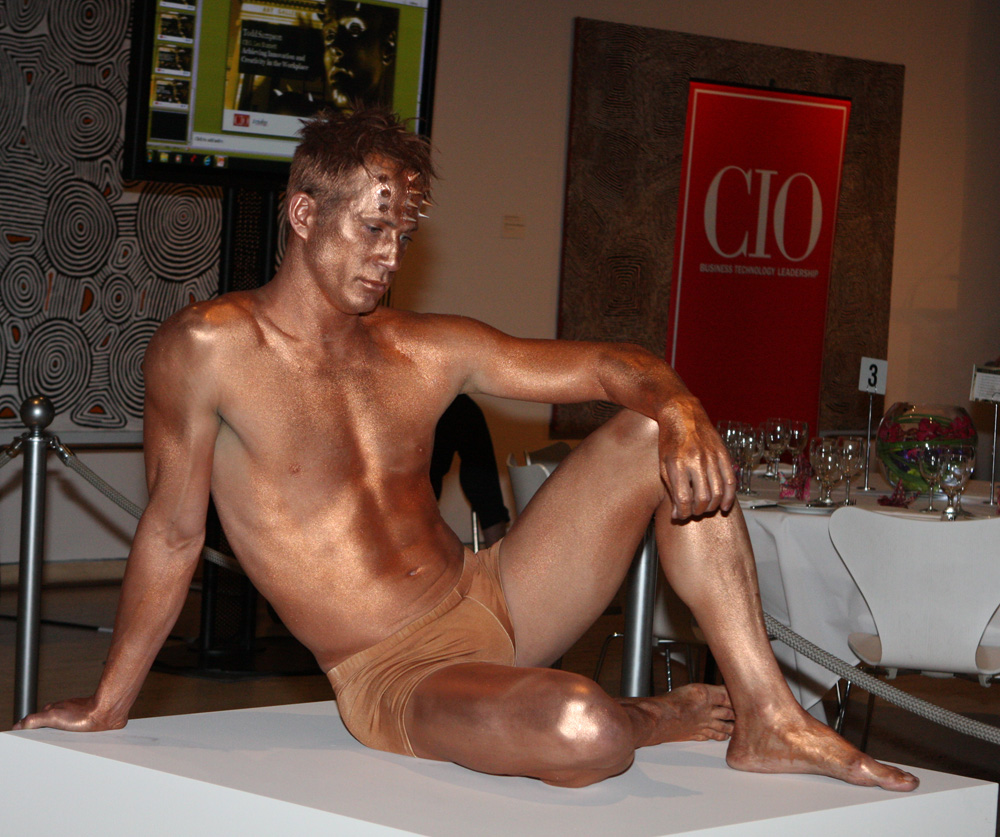
Art Gallery of New South Wales in Sydney, Australia

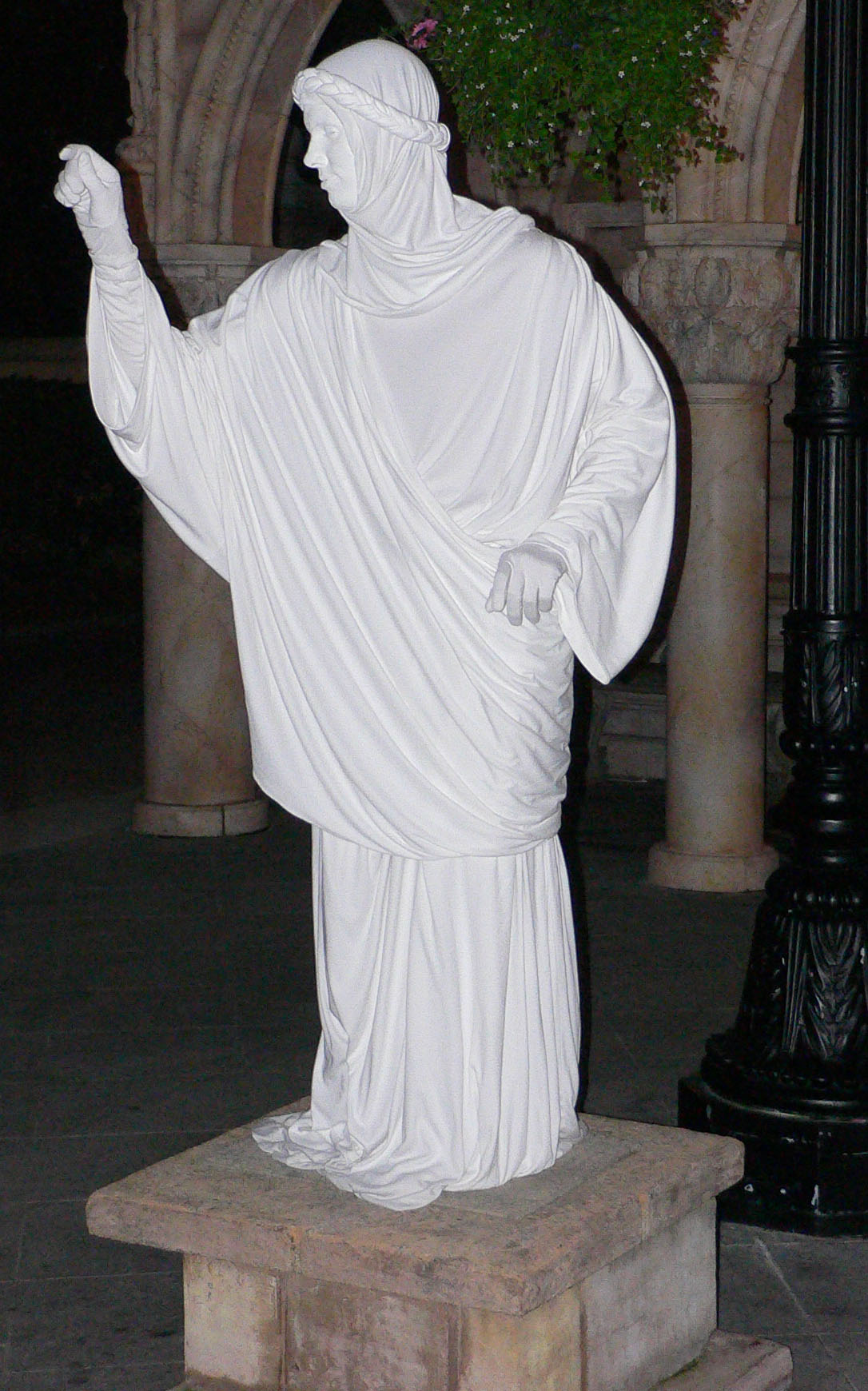
Epcot, Walt Disney World Resort, Bay Lake, Florida

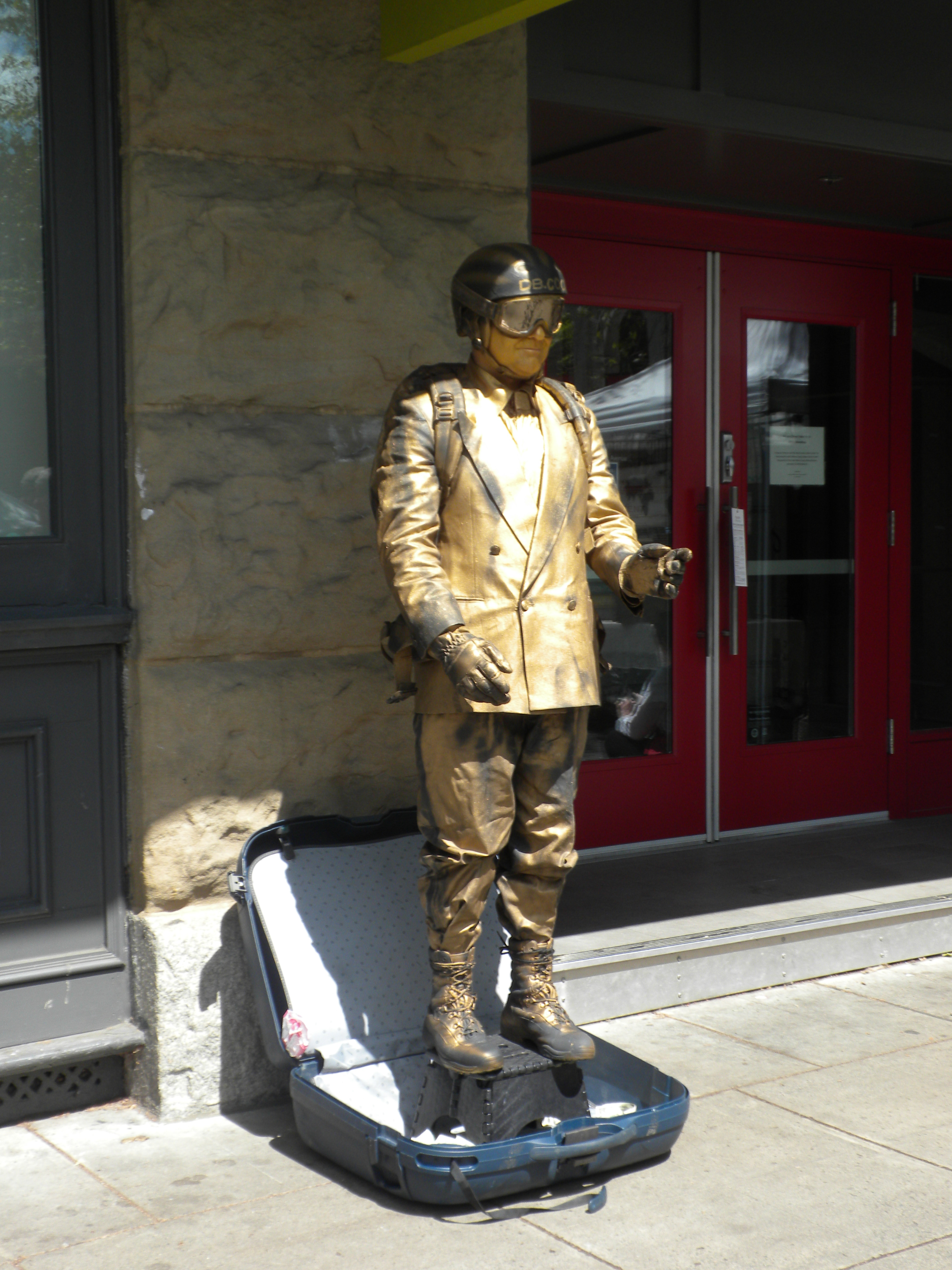
Living statue of D. B. Cooper in Portland, Oregon, U.S.

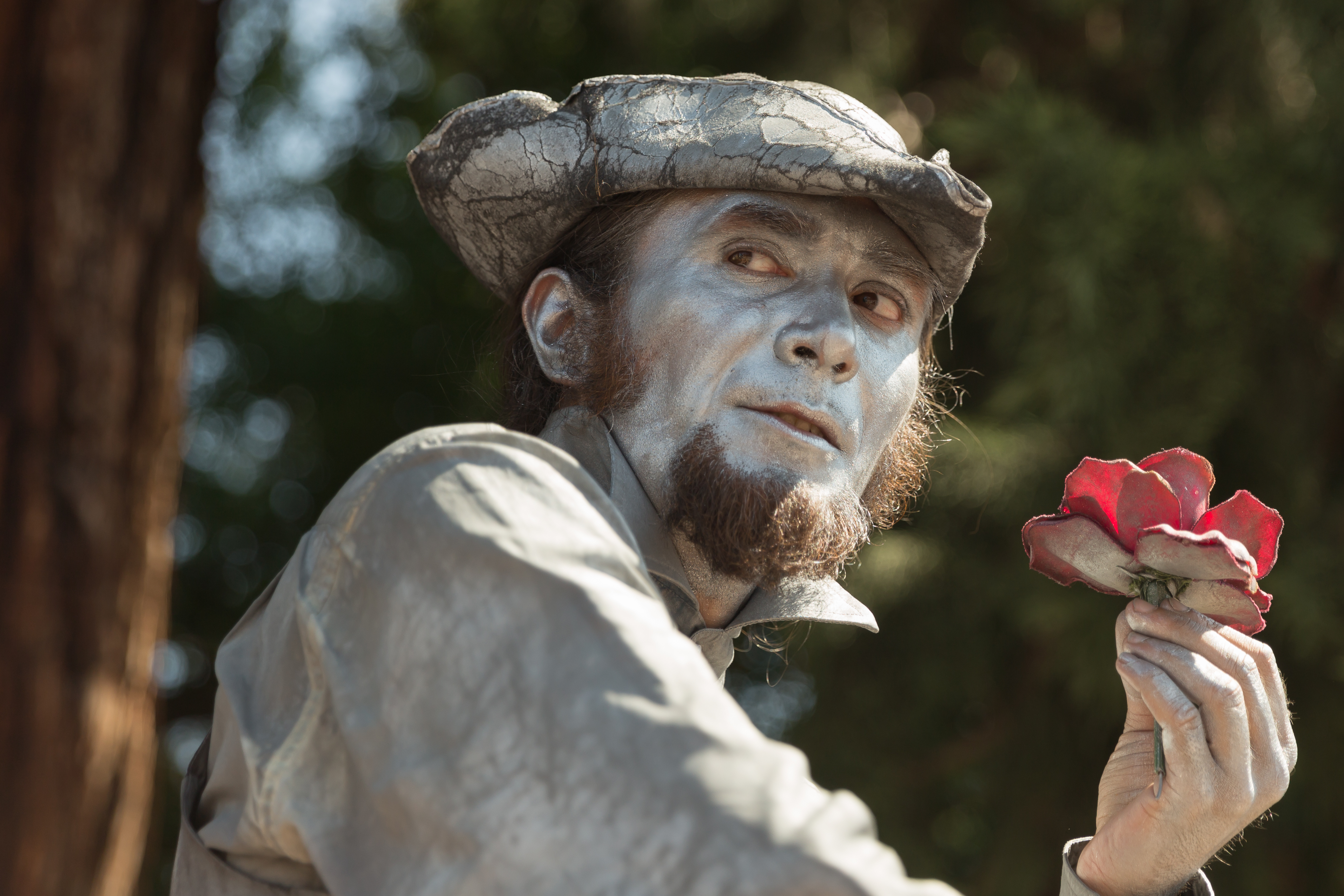
Annecy, France

== See also ==
- Body painting – Form of art using the human body as the canvas
- Busking – Performing in public places for gratuities or to be seen only
- Mannequin Challenge – Viral Internet video trend
- Weeping Angel, a living being that resembles a statue – Fictional villain in Doctor Who
