= Roland Smith =

American author of young adult fiction (born 1951)

- Born: November 30, 1951 (age 74); Portland, Oregon, U.S.
- Education: Portland State University
- Occupation: Author
- Spouse: Marie Smith
- Website: rolandsmith.com

Roland Smith (born November 30, 1951) is an American author of young adult fiction as well as nonfiction books for children.

== Early life and education ==
Roland Smith was born in Portland, Oregon, graduated from Portland State University and, following a part-time job at the Oregon Zoo in Portland, began a 20-year career as a zookeeper, both at the Oregon Zoo and the Point Defiance Zoo in Tacoma, Washington. After working to save wildlife following the Exxon Valdez oil spill, in 1990, he published his first book, Sea Otter Rescue, a non-fiction account of the process of animal rescue. Smith continued to draw upon his zoo experiences for other non-fiction titles, including Journey of the Red Wolf, which won an Oregon Book Award in 1996.

== Publishing career ==
In 1997 Smith published his second novel, Thunder Cave. The book continues Smith's theme, as teenage protagonist Jacob Lansa follows his biologist father to Africa where the father is researching elephants. Lansa is also seen in 1999's Jaguar and 2001's The Last Lobo, as well as Tentacles, the sequel to Cryptid Hunters, and Chupacabra, the sequel to Tentacles.

== Works ==
=== Non-fiction ===
- Sea Otter Rescue (1991)
- Primates in the Zoo (1993)
- Snakes in the Zoo (1992)
- Inside the Zoo Nursery (1993)
- Cats in the Zoo (1994)
- Whales, Dolphins and porpoises in the Zoo (1994)
- African Elephants (1995)
- Journey of the Red Wolf (1996; Winner of the 1996 Oregon Book Award for Young Readers Literature)
- Vultures (1997)
- In the Forest with the Elephants (1998)

=== Picture books by Roland and Marie Smith ===
- B is for Beaver (2003)
- E is for Evergreen (2004)
- Z is for Zookeeper (2005)
- N is for our Nation’s Capital (2010)
- S is for Smithsonian (2010)
- W is for Waves (2013)
- T is for Time (2015)

=== Lansa/Hickock/O'Hara continuity ===
- Thunder Cave (1997) (Jacob Lansa #1)
- Sasquatch (1998) (Dylan Hickock)
- Jaguar (1999) (Jacob Lansa #2)
- The Last Lobo (2001) (Jacob Lansa #3) (guest appearance by Buckley Johnson from Sasquatch)
- Cryptid Hunters (2005) (O'Hara #1)
- Tentacles (2009) (O'Hara #2; mention of Dylan Hickock; guest appearance by Jacob Lansa)
- Chupacabra (2013) (O'Hara #3; mention of Jacob Lansa; guest appearance by Dylan Hickock)
- Mutation (2014) (O'Hara #4; guest appearance by Dylan Hickock and Jacob Lansa)

=== Jack Osborne series ===
- Zach's Lie (2003)
- Jack's Run (2005)

=== Peak Marcello series ===
- Peak (2007)
- The Edge (2015)
- Ascent (2018)
- Descent (2020)

=== I, Q book series ===
- I, Q Book One: Independence Hall (2008)
- I, Q Book Two: The White House (2010)
- I, Q Book Three: Kitty Hawk (2012)
- I, Q Book Four: The Alamo with Michael P. Spradlin (2013)
- I, Q Book Five: The Windy City with Spradlin (2014)
- I, Q Book Six: Alcatraz with Spradlin (2014)

=== Storm Runners trilogy ===
- Storm Runners (2010)
- The Surge (2011)
- Eruption (2012)

=== Beneath series ===
- Beneath (2009)
- Above (2016)

=== Standalones ===
- Amy's Missing (1996)
- Elephant Run (2007)
- The Captain's Dog: My Journey with the Lewis and Clark Tribe (2008)
- Legwork (2011; e-book)
- Hijack Over Weaver's Needle (2012)
- The Switch (2022)

=== Other ===
- Shatterproof (2012) - fourth book in the series The 39 Clues: Cahills vs. Vespers.

== Awards ==
Smith's books have won "Book of the Year" awards in Colorado, Nevada, South Carolina, and Florida, as well as in his native state of Oregon. Peak won the 2007 National Outdoor Book Award (Children's Category). Smith has also won 3 awards for his best selling series Cryptid Hunters in 2008 and 2010.

== Personal life ==
Smith lives in Portland, Oregon with his wife and stepchildren.
