= Sasquatch (novel) =

Novel by Roland Smith

- Author: Roland Smith
- Cover artist: Stephanie Bart-Hovarth
- Language: English
- Genre: Fantasy, Adventure
- Publisher: Hyperion Books
- Publication date: 1998/1999
- Publication place: United States
- Media type: Print (Paperback)
- Pages: 188 pp (first edition, paperback)
- ISBN: 0-7868-1334-2

Sasquatch is a novel written by Roland Smith.

== Plot ==
Fourteen-year-old Dylan Hickock's father, Bill, had quite often been strange. Bill would often go from one favorite subject to another, borrowing books to suit his interest. Dylan's mother goes on a four-month expedition to Egypt as an Egyptologist. Dylan's father had been on a hunting trip to Mount St. Helens, which is in danger of an eruption. Later, he takes Dylan to a cryptozoology convention called Bigfoot International, where Dr. Theodore Flagg is late for the meeting, and one member shows a huge snapshot of bigfoot.

Later, when Dr. Flagg, who supports bringing in evidence of Bigfoot in the form of an actual specimen, dead or alive, arrives, someone in the audience named Buckley Johnson objects to his views. Dylan's father objects to the idea as well, but is quiet about it. Dylan and his father later go to his house, because he owns real estate and Mr. Johnson is one of his buyers. There is a giant statue of Bigfoot in his yard, and he is being watched by a neighbor, Peter Nunn, who also owns a house from Bill Hickock's real estate and has set up video cameras and tape recorders.

Bill invites Mr. Johnson to dinner with him and Dylan. Mr. Johnson tells them to call him Buck, and denies ever seeing the Sasquatch. Later, while Dylan's father joins Dr. Flagg on the expedition to Mount St. Helens, and everyone comes to Dylan's house for the night, taking away all communications so that the word isn't spread. Dylan's father wants him to quietly get Buck involved in this, but when Dr. Flagg is woken up he points a gun at Dylan, and Bill thinks Dr. Flagg is crazy.

Dylan goes over to Buck's house, enters from the back so "Peter Nunn" is not able to capture them on camera. He finds out that Buck's wife Betty and his son Gary had died, and that Buck is a retired field biologist. Dylan later shows his dad, who is not tech-savvy, how to e-mail. He wants to go on the expedition with them, but his dad says it's too dangerous, and they must leave now before they set up restricted access zones, and Dylan promises to stay with his friend Doug.

Dylan meets the expedition's tracker, Kurt Skipp, who is slow at walking but very quick with his hands. When the expedition leaves, "Peter Nunn", who now calls himself Agent Crow, shows up at Dylan's house. He shows Dylan an FBI badge, and warns him that Buck is dangerous. After Agent Crow leaves, Dylan arrives at Buck's house, and Buck demands the extra communication radio. The radio was left behind by Clyde and his brothers, because they only need one radio as Clyde's brothers are mute and he claims that they were sent by aliens from the planet Zona.

Dylan is about to give Buck the radio and a map, but says that he will not give them to him unless he takes Dylan with him to Mount St. Helens. Buck needs the radio and map, so he brings Dylan with him. Buck also says that Agent Crow is following him because he thinks he stole something, and that Agent Crow is no longer an actual FBI agent.

On the news, a volcanologist being interviewed says that the volcano is not likely to erupt. On the way to the mountain, Dylan has to pee and is interrupted by tremors caused by the volcano. Buck takes Dylan to an old cabin, which smells horrible, and they open the windows even though it lets ash inside. When they go to sleep, Dylan hears a piercing howl in the distance, and Buck insists it's a mountain lion.

The next day, Dylan is sent to fetch water from the river, because Buck uses a walking staff to walk, and the cane has a carving of a mountain and his wife and son. Dylan gets lost and encounters a Sasquatch footprint. He eventually gets back to the cabin, but there is a tremor and a hot pipe sags from the ceiling, and Buck warns Dylan not to touch it. Over breakfast, Dylan convinces Buck to tell him about Sasquatch, but Buck says only if he doesn't ask any more questions. He also explains that a locked cabinet in the cabin is Pandora's Box.

Buck tells him that the Sasquatch is real, and that the howl they heard last night was from a Sasquatch, and that his friend Billy Taylor who had previously owned the cabin could talk to the Sasquatch, and when he died the cabin was given to Buck. The next few days it rained, and Dylan and Buck were kept inside. On the radio, they hear that the expedition is to go down to the ravine, and Buck seems to dislike the idea greatly.

Dylan goes for a walk and encounters Agent Crow. He explains that Buck, who likely went under the pseudonym D. B. Cooper or Dan Cooper, hijacked an airplane and stole $200,000, and later a boy found some of the money on the ground, and the FBI considered Buck to be a primary suspect. When Dylan returns to the cabin, Buck is not there, and the walking staff, as well as the map and radio were gone as well.

Pandora's Box was unlocked, and Dylan finds another staff in it, and uses it to turn a hole in the ground, which opens a trapdoor with an extremely long ladder. Dylan climbs down the ladder, and tries to look for Buck. He gets lost, and there are still tremors, and he discovers money in the caves under the cabin. He yells for help, and Buck and an adult Sasquatch find him. Buck admits that he is D. B. Cooper to Dylan Hickock. He says he committed the hijacking to pay for cancer treatments for his son. He also says that his wife Betty had told Billy to stash the money in the cabin. Buck had also talked to Dylan's dad through the radio by setting up a code.

Buck tells Dylan to go to the ravine and make giant Sasquatch footprints using a cast made from real ones, and to lead them away from the tunnel. Agent Crow interferes on the radio, and talks about Buck, and Kurt Skipp soon arrives and discovers Dylan making the footprints, and sees a Bigfoot-like creature, and shoots at it. Dylan tries to stop him, but Kurt knees him in the stomach.

At the same time, the volcano had a small eruption, and trees collapse on Kurt and kill him. Dylan hears his dad on the radio and talks to him. Dylan discovers his dad at a waterfall, and he is injured and barely conscious. A Sasquatch takes Dylan's dad to a safer place and beckons Dylan to follow. He talks to Dr. Flagg on the radio and tells him about the situation.

A helicopter arrives to take Dylan and his Dad back to civilization. Clyde and his brothers are missing, and Dylan thinks they went back to Zona. When they get back home, Dylan wonders what had happened to Buck, and Dylan sends a message to his mother that Dylan's father is in hospital.

Dylan receives an e-mail from Buck that an "old friend" is about to arrive at his house, but it's Agent Crow. In the fridge, there was a message from Buck for Agent Crow, saying that he confessed to the hijacking. Another message was for Dylan, saying that Agent Crow should get more exercise. After Agent Crow leaves, Dylan also finds a wooden staff from Buck to remember him by. On it, a face resembling Dylan was carved into the handle.

== See also ==
- D. B. Cooper in popular culture
