= List of fictional presidents of the United States (S–T) =

Lists of fictional presidents of the United States
| A–B | C–D | E–F |
| G–H | I–J | K–M |
| N–R | S–T | U–Z |
Fictional presidencies of historical figures
| A–B | C–D | E–G |
| H–J | K–L | M–O |
| P–R | S–U | V–Z |

The following is a list of fictional presidents of the United States, S through T.

== S ==
=== President Elaine Sallinger ===
- Presidency mentioned in: Red Dwarf novel Better Than Life
- Described as "perhaps the greatest American President of all time".
- Appears only as the fifth carving on Mount Rushmore.

=== President Robert Samuelson ===
- President in: the novel Red-12 by Louis A. Goth
- Guides the US (and the world) through a highly dangerous crisis precipitated by a nuclear explosion inside a Chinese satellite over the Pacific.
- This causes tensions and mutual suspicions among the world's superpowers, and there are increasing indications of possible involvement by extraterrestrial beings.

=== President Newton Sanders ===
- President in: Mark Lawson's novel: Idlewild
- In a universe in which President John F. Kennedy survived the assassination attempt on his life, and went on to be re-elected in 1964, Newton Sanders wins the 1992 Presidential election running as a third-party candidate - defeating both President George H. W. Bush and Bill Clinton.
- He is assassinated via a "baby bomb" (an infant wrapped in Semtex and detonated) by Yusaf Yusaf (alias "Anderson Kempinski Fraser"). As he did not have a vice-president, he is succeeded by the Speaker of the House.

=== President Matthew Vincente "Matt" Santos ===
- President in: The West Wing (television series)
- A former mayor and three-term congressman from Houston, Texas.
- Santos is married to Helen Santos and has two children.
- He is preparing to retire from politics when he is approached by Josh Lyman about a presidential campaign.
- He starts out the campaign in last place in a crowded field, before catapulting into third place after receiving 19% of the vote in the New Hampshire primary.
- Surging late after winning the California primary, Santos is deadlocked with the frontrunner, Vice President Bob Russell at the 2006 Democratic National Convention. Santos wins the party nomination on the fourth ballot and names former Labor Secretary and White House Chief of Staff Leo McGarry as his running mate.
- Santos narrowly defeats Senator Arnold Vinick of California by a count of 272 to 266 electoral votes. However, this victory is undermined by the sudden death of Leo McGarry (written due to the real-life passing of McGarry's portrayer, actor John Spencer) on Election Night.
- Before his inauguration, Santos names his defeated rival Vinick his secretary of state, ensuring bipartisan cooperation in handling growing tensions between Russia and China, and seeks the confirmation of Pennsylvania Governor Eric Baker as his vice president.
- Second sitting U.S. Congressman to be elected to the presidency after James A. Garfield.
- In the West Wing canon, Santos is the first Hispanic-American president.
- Played by: Jimmy Smits
- Party: Democratic

=== President Lee Sarason ===
- President in: It Can't Happen Here
- Chief political operative and adviser to Berzelius 'Buzz' Windrip as a Governor and U.S. Senator.
- U.S. Secretary of State during Windrip's presidency, during which time the United States is transformed into an authoritarian Corporatist country.
- Following the flight of the disillusioned Vice President Perley Beecroft to Canada, Sarason leads a coup which sees Windrip overthrown and exiled to France.
- Due to extravagance and relatively weak rule, Sarason is soon after killed in a bloody putsch at the White House organised by General Dewey Haik, who proclaims himself as the new president. Thereafter, a military dictatorship erodes Corporatist power, plunging the United States into civil war and a war with Mexico.
- Party: Corporatist (presumably, previously Democratic)

=== President James William Sawyer ===
- President in: White House Down
- Proposes a controversial peace treaty with allied nations to both remove military forces from and provide significant financial aid to the Middle East. The controversy of the treaty prompts his own Vice President to announce his resignation in protest.
- Is in the White House when terrorists attack - led by his own Secret Service detail leader Martin Walker, whose son died during military deployment, and ex-Delta Force and CIA operator Emil Stenz. The attack is later revealed to have been masterminded by Eli Raphelson, the Speaker of the United States House of Representatives, who is allied with influential groups who stand to lose money should the peace deal go through.
- Is rescued by Capitol policeman John Cale, and along with him attempts to escape from the White House.
- Presumed dead after an explosion in the White House cabana, but narrowly escapes. He is later shot defending a hostage, but survives when the bullet deflects off his pocket watch.
- Married to Allison Sawyer, who is abroad in Paris during the events of the film.
- Party: Democratic
- Played by Jamie Foxx

=== President Kenneth Saxon ===
- President in: Missing! (novel, 1969) by Michael Avallone.
- Elected in 1968
- Defeated in 1972 by Robert Winslow Sheldrake.
- Party: Democratic

=== President Adam Northfield Scott ===
- President in: The Kidnapping of the President
- Revolutionaries kidnap him on a visit to Toronto, Canada.
- Played by: Hal Holbrook

=== President Nehemiah Scudder ===
- President in: Robert Heinlein's Future History, Scudder is elected president in 2012 and
  - Establishes a theocracy.
  - Holds no further elections.
  - Takes the title "Prophet" rather than "President".
  - Establishes a new capital, New Jerusalem, in the Mid-West.
- His descendants rule as "Prophets" for most of the 21st Century but grow increasingly corrupt and venal, finally overthrown in the novella If This Goes On—.
- The new government declares a restoration of the Constitution of the United States "as it stood prior to the inauguration of President Scudder".
- Heinlein planned, but never wrote, the story in which Scudder gains power, to be named "The Stone Pillow", but decided that it would be too depressing.
- In Heinlein's earlier novel For Us, The Living: A Comedy of Customs (written 1939 but only published after Heinlein's death) Scudder attempts to be elected but his extensive use of Ku Klux Klan type thugs alarm many people and a counter-mobilization manages to forestall his election, thus in the earlier version the US avoids decades of theocracy.

=== President George Sears ===
- President in: Metal Gear Solid (unnamed in the game. Name given in Metal Gear Solid 2: Sons of Liberty).
- The 43rd president
- George Sears is actually a pseudonym for Solidus Snake, a survivor of the Les Enfants Terribles project that also created protagonist Solid Snake and his nemesis Liquid Snake.
- In the sequel Metal Gear Solid 2, he is revealed to be a former member of The Patriots (a secret group that controls the United States) and is the true mastermind behind the Shadow Moses island incident in 2005 (the fictional events of Metal Gear Solid).
- He acts without permission from the Patriots and is forced to resign his presidency.
- Sears is succeeded by President James Johnson by the time of Metal Gear Solid 2.
- In an early draft of the Metal Gear Solid 2 story, George Sears is named George Ryan and the events of the game were meant to occur while Solidus was still in office.

=== President Phil Ken Sebben ===
- President in: Harvey Birdman, Attorney at Law special Harvey Birdman: Attorney General
- Has no memory of being elected president and is quickly impeached.
- Loose parody of Donald Trump.
- Played by: Stephen Colbert

=== President David Segovia ===
- President in: FlashForward, a 2009 ABC Television Series
- On October 6, 2009, during his second term, the entire human race passes out for one minute and seventeen seconds and experiences a future memory from April 29, 2010.
- During President Segovia's Flashforward, he is informed of some major event taking place.
- Played by: Peter Coyote

=== President William Lyons Selby ===
- President in: The Outer Limits episode "The Hundred Days of the Dragon"
- Vice President: Theodore Pearson
- Selby is assassinated before election and is replaced by a lookalike agent from an unnamed Asian government.
- The Vice-President arrests the agent when the plot is discovered.
- Party: Not mentioned
- Played by: Sidney Blackmer

=== President Julian September ===
- President in: JLA #18 (05/1998)
- September alters history to become President of the United States.
- The JLA destroy his Engine of Chance, which only alters history further.

=== President Robert "Dakota Bob" Shaefer ===
- President in: The Boys
- Republican candidate in the 2000 election.
- Previously served as Vice President to George H. W. Bush after Dan Quayle
- Heeds intelligence warnings about terrorist hijackings; was expecting 9/11, and orders that three of the hijacked planes be shot down.
- However, he is bludgeoned with a fire extinguisher and left incapacitated; the vice-president subsequently orders that the fourth plane be allowed to proceed unmolested, so that superheroes sponsored by Vought-American Consolidated can rescue it. The failed rescue leads to the plane destroying the Brooklyn Bridge.
- Leads America into war against Afghanistan and Pakistan.
- He was killed by an angry wolverine released by his vice president, Victor "Vic the Veep" Neuman, who then succeeded him.
- In the live-action television series, Robert "Dakota Bob" Singer, played by Jim Beaver (the name change referring to his character Bobby Singer in Supernatural).
  - He was originally the U.S. Secretary of Defense and a staunch opponent to Vought but had his hands tied due to the creation of Supe terrorists after Homelander's unauthorised distribution of Compound V to terrorists.
  - Running as the Democratic nominee for president in 2024 on a platform of curtailing the power and influence of Supes, his election immediately makes him the target of a plot by Homelander and Sister Sage to install a Supe supremacist regime by assassinating him and elevating his running mate Victoria Neuman (a Supe) to the presidency. On January 6, after Homelander outs Neuman as a Supe on live television and Singer is nearly assassinated by a shapeshifting Supe posing as Annie January, Singer is framed for ordering Billy Butcher's assassination of Neuman (having been party to the CIA's and The Boys' attempts to pre-emptively assassinate her) and arrested before he can be inaugurated as president. As a result, House Speaker Calhoun, a staunch Homelander ally, is sworn in as president instead.
  - After Homelander's death and the impeachment of President Ashley Barrett (who had been appointed Vice President and succeeded Calhoun following his assassination by Homelander), Singer is exonerated and instated as President. Wishing to strengthen the Federal Bureau for Superhuman Affairs to combat a discombobulated Vought International and remaining hostile Supes (including those created during trials to recreate V1, the original version of Compound V), he sought to appoint Hugh 'Hughie' Campbell as its director; politely declining the position (due to owing his own electrical store), Singer said that the position was still open to him should he reconsider.

=== President John Shaw ===
- President in: Time Trax
- While serving as Secretary of State in 1993 he is the target of a time travelling assassin.
- By 2093 he is considered one of the three great Presidents along with Abraham Lincoln and Elaine Nakamura.
- Played by: Dorian Harewood

=== President James Kavanaugh Shea ===
- President in: The Godfather Returns and The Godfather's Revenge
- Former Governor of New Jersey.
- Born in 1919.
- Appoints his brother Daniel Brendan Shea to be his Attorney General.
- Presidential term from 1961 to 1964.
- Assassinated during the 1964 Democratic National Convention.
- Based on President John F. Kennedy.

=== President Shears ===
- President in: Traveler

=== President Robert Winslow Sheldrake ===
- President in: Missing! (novel, 1969) by Michael Avallone
- Born in Nebraska.
- Defeats incumbent President Kenneth Saxon in 1972.
- Is missing on Inauguration Day, January 20, 1973.
- Is found two days later curled up naked in an air duct after accidentally being given tea with an LSD laced sugar cube by his daughter.
- Party: Republican

=== President Andrew Shepherd ===
- President in: The American President
- A native of Wisconsin.
- Avowed fan of the Green Bay Packers.
- Shepherd went to Stanford University before teaching history at the University of Wisconsin.
- He has a daughter named Lucy and is married to Mary Shepherd, who later dies of cancer.
- As a bachelor president, Shepherd starts dating environmental lobbyist Sydney Wade of Virginia while running for re-election.
- Cannot get his best friend, Chief of Staff A.J. McInerney, to grant his simplest of requests, "Call me Andy" (as opposed to 'Mr. President'), even when they are playing pool. However, after two dates, Sydney grants his request.
- Orders the bombing of Libyan Intelligence Headquarters in retaliation for their bombing of an American missile defense system in Israel. Refuses to use the attack for political gain as he regrets the killing of the building's innocent night shift.
- Quote: "You want to claim this land as the land of the free? Then the symbol of your country cannot just be a flag. The symbol also has to be one of its citizens exercising his right to burn that flag in protest. Now show me that, defend that, celebrate that in your classrooms. Then you can stand up and sing about the land of the free."
- Party: Democratic
- Played by: Michael Douglas

=== President Sally Sheridan ===
- President in: XIII: The Conspiracy
- First female president.
- Presidential term 2009–2010.
- Assassinated whilst giving her Veterans Day speech in Raleigh, North Carolina.
- Vice President Joseph K. Galbrain replaces her.
- Her murder is later revealed to have been orchestrated by her brother Walter "Wally" Sheridan, and other members of the XIII group. Her death enables him to run for president, gaining support through the sympathy at the loss of his sister.
- A female version of President William B. Sheridan, who in the XIII comics was Walter Sheridan's brother.
- Has opposing political views to her brother, Walter.
- Party: Democratic (presumably)

=== President Walter "Wally" Sheridan ===
- President in: XIII (comics) and XIII: The Conspiracy (TV film and series)
- Presidential term 2013–2014.
- Brother of anterior president William B. Sheridan (comics)
- Brother of anterior president Sally Sheridan (TV film and series)
- In the comics, these two powerful politicians and brothers are a comic version of John F. Kennedy and his brother Robert F. Kennedy. In the book, Wally is the mastermind behind the XIII conspiracy, which began with the assassination of his brother (a nod to the JFK murder). It would have culminated in the establishment of a dictatorship in the United States.
- In the TV film (XIII: The Conspiracy) and series (XIII: The Series) he has his sister killed and smears the reputation of her successor, Joseph K. Galbrain. He later runs for, and wins the national election, and comes closer to establishing a dictatorship in the United States.
- Resigns from office due to "health problems".
- Campaigns for the Republican nomination for president in the 2016 election when he is killed by Colonel Amos.
- Party: Republican
- Buried at the Walter Sheridan Presidential Library in Charlotte, North Carolina.

=== President Alexander George Sherman ===
- President in: The Genesis Machine (novel, 1978) by James P. Hogan
- Sherman is president in a near future where a western alliance is under pressure from, and losing territory in a domino-effect to an African-Asian axis.
- A theoretical scientist creates a new mathematical model of the universe, and in doing so, creates an untraceable weapon that can restore the balance of world power.
- Instead of using the weapon to give superiority to the west, while President Sherman stands by in shock, the scientist destroys all weapons of mass destruction worldwide, and thus sets the stage for an enforced world peace.
- Party: Not mentioned

=== President William Shockley ===
- President in: First Family (movie, 1980)
- Serves as Vice President to Manfred Link.
- Becomes President after President Link and the First Family are declared "dead" by the U.S. Supreme Court after President Link attempts to sell U.S. citizens for a super-growth plant food.
- Dies from a panic-induced heart attack while taking the oath of office.
- President Shockley is given high marks for his master of the ship of state, albeit for some thirty seconds.
- Played by: Bob Dishy

=== President Angela Shostakovich ===
- President in: nightmare future in an episode of Mr. Belvedere
- President of the United States in 2040.
- Played by: Michele Matheson

=== President Bubba Shrub ===
- President in: Bikini Planet
- Played by: Richard Van Vleet

=== President Gordon Shumway ===
- President in: ALF – "Hail to the Chief" episode
- In a dream sequence, Kate dreams Alf is elected president, solves all the country's problems, and gets his face on Mount Rushmore.

=== President Will Signoff ===
- President in: The Adventures of Rocky and Bullwinkle movie

=== President Gene Simone ===
- President in: Shadowrun role-playing game
- Presidential term 2064–2069.
- 10th UCAS President | 56th US President.
- Senate President Pro Tempore prior to becoming president.
- Succeeds President Nadja Daviar after her disappearance soon after the end of the failed November 3 coup.
- VP Nadja Daviar had succeeded President Kyle Haeffner after his death during the coup, and the Speaker of the House was likewise incapable of assuming office.
- Succeeded by Angela Colloton (R) in 2069.

=== President Lisa Simpson ===
- President in: The Simpsons – "Bart to the Future" episode
- Native of Springfield.
- The first straight female president, Lisa is the incumbent president in 2030, succeeding Donald Trump (though Trump himself would become the actual 45th president), Chaz Bono, and Ted Kennedy.
- At the end of the episode "The Kid Is All Right", Lisa Simpson is running for president in the 2056 presidential election against Isabel Gutierrez (Republican). During the debates, Simpson responds to Anderson Cooper's question about getting the United States out of the War in Afghanistan by saying she will throw in the towel and make Afghanistan a state.
- Lisa Simpson also becomes president in the episode "Mother and Child Reunion", in which her decision not to attend college ultimately leads her to the presidency but results in a decades-long estrangement from her mother, Marge.
- In multiple episodes, Lisa has fantasized about her election as president being prevented due to a minor failing in her education, such as in "Lisa on Ice" when a reporter's revelation of her failing grade in gym class during her inauguration results in her banishment.
- Party: Democratic

=== President Erika Sloane ===
- President in Mission Impossible - Dead Reckoning and Mission: Impossible – The Final Reckoning.
- First female African American president and former Director of the Central Intelligence Agency.
- During her tenure as CIA Director, she supervised SAC operative August Walker, who was later revealed to be the leader of a covert bio-terrorism organisation named The Apostles. The group tried, and failed, to detonate a nuclear device in the Siachen Glacier in Kashmir. Despite this, Sloane was able to maintain her professional reputation and enter politics.
- She was elected president some time before the events of Dead Reckoning, and in the film only appears as a presidential portrait in the office of Director of National Intelligence Delinger.
- In The Final Reckoning, Sloane is in office when a rogue artificial intelligence dubbed 'The Entity', originally a project of the United States Government, goes rogue and begins infiltrating the defense and intelligence apparatus of countries worldwide, and causes international chaos through manipulation of the media. The AI also recruits numerous followers who form a doomsday cult and attempt to infiltrate government, military and law enforcement to advance its interests.
- When 'The Entity' gains control of the nuclear weapons systems of France, the UK, India, Pakistan, China, North Korea and Israel, President Sloane is advised to order a first strike against the command centres of the other compromised nations before 'The Entity' also gains access to the United States Strategic Command. This would prevent the AI from launching missiles and save 7 billion people, but would result in the death of 100 million. She is also advised to select a significant American city to nuke as a compromise and to potentially prevent World War III breaking out with the other nations as a result of her actions.
- Declines to use the nuclear football to authorise the strikes, opting to release Impossible Missions Force agent Ethan Hunt from federal custody to stop 'The Entity'. She allows him to escape on Marine One, and later uses connections with Rear Admiral Neely, the commander of Carrier Strike Group 10, to further assist Hunt in locating means to stop 'The Entity'.
- Her actions result in a member of her Secret Service Presidential Protective Detail, secretly a recruit of 'The Entity's doomsday cult, trying to assassinate her. She is saved by General Sidney, the Chairman of the Joint Chiefs of Staff, who despite his objections to her decisions shoots the cultist dead but is also fatally wounded in the process.
- Ultimately, the IMF is able to defeat 'The Entity' and prevent global annihilation. Sloane then travels from Mount Weather Emergency Operations Center via Air Force One and reunites with her son, a member of the United States Marine Corps.
- Cabinet includes Secretary of State Walters, Secretary of Defense Serling Bernstein, Director of National Intelligence Delinger and later Richards (the former Director of the National Reconnaissance Office) and Director of the Central Intelligence Agency Eugene Kittridge. Another cabinet level official is Director of the National Security Agency Angstrom.
- Played by: Angela Bassett.
- Party: Unspecified

=== President Charles H.P. Smith ===
- President in: November
- Played by: Nathan Lane
- Smith is an unpopular president up for re-election.

=== President David Roger "Dave" Smith ===
- President in: "The Unknown Law" by Avram Davidson (1963)
- The youngest President ever elected, being just thirty-five.
- Popular veteran of a war recently fought in Sumatra, loosely modeled on John F. Kennedy (President at the time of writing).
- Enters office directly into a major crisis:
  - The Cold War has spread into space, with the United States and Soviet Union staking rival claims in the Asteroid Belt.
  - On Earth an alliance of anti-US Latin-American nationalists has united all of South America and are spreading northwards into Panama.
- Faces a domestic crisis with Jim Macdonald, a political rival and former friend, trying to blackmail Smith into making him Secretary of Space. Macdonald intends to use this position to spark an all-out confrontation with the Soviets, unilaterally seizing disputed asteroids. If not given this position, he will plunge the just-inaugurated President into a major public scandal and destroy his credibility. Macdonald has been put up to this by his wife Sarra, a shrewd schemer and manipulator - who is the President's mistress.
- On the third day after inauguration, the president gets a visit from three officials who inform him of an "Unknown Law" inaugurated by George Washington and maintained secretly by all Presidents since: Once in a term, a President may order the assassination of a person who, in the President's judgement, constitutes a Clear and Present Danger to the Integrity of the Nation and against whom no evidence can be brought in a court. It had been invoked seventeen times in the history of the US, and the secret was always kept.
- After his initial shock, President Smith concludes that he must invoke the Unknown Law already on his third day in office.

=== President Robert "Bud" Smith ===
- President in: National Lampoon's Men in White
- Played by: Barry Bostwick

=== President Jefferson Smithsonian ===
- President in: Henry Stickmin's Infiltrating the Airship
- Played by: Marcus Bromander

=== President Jennifer A. Smythe ===
- President in: The Probability Broach, as part of the North American Confederacy Series by L. Neil Smith, in which the United States becomes a libertarian state after a successful Whiskey Rebellion and George Washington being overthrown and executed by firing squad for treason in 1794.
- Serves as the 26th President of the North American Confederacy.
- Serves as president from 1984 to 1992.
- She is the fourth woman to hold the office of the presidency after Harriet Beecher Stowe, Rose Wilder Lane, and Ayn Rand.
- Party: Gallatinist

=== Acting president Elizabeth Sovrain ===
- Acting president in: Strands of Sorrow, part of the Black Tide Rising series by John Ringo
- Secretary of education prior to the zombie apocalypse caused by the H7D3 virus.
- During the Fall (the final collapse of society into chaos as the plague hits a tipping point), her security detail attempts to evacuate her from DC to a continuity bunker, but with the city overrun by infected they are unable to escape, and instead shelter in the Department of Education's dedicated bunker. She remains there for the next year until finally being found and rescued by US military forces led by Wolf Squadron, a mostly-civilian militia founded by Steve Smith organizing survivors in the Atlantic Ocean and being deputized by the remaining military command structure.
- Due to no one else higher than her in the United States presidential line of succession having been found, she is installed as acting president, and quickly proves herself inept at the job. Driven by a delusional desperation to find her daughter (who was infected just before the Fall), she orders the military to stop killing infected and focus on searching for her daughter, while also having Smith arrested for war crimes on the basis of all the infected killed on his orders were still technically human.
- With her actions undermining all efforts to rebuild the country – as Texas' provisional government threatens to secede and there are rumblings of a military coup - Smith's daughters Faith and Sophia stage an unauthorized rescue mission into DC to find someone who can legally supplant Sovrain as president. They succeed in locating and rescuing Vice-President Rebecca Staba, who takes over as president and overrides all of Sovrain's orders after removing her from power.
- It is not directly stated what happens to Sovrain after this, but it is suggested that she was declared mentally inept and institutionalized.
- Party: Not stated, but served in a Republican administration.

=== President Sparrow ===
- President in: The Messiah of Morris Avenue
- Fourth Sparrow to occupy the religious right White House.

=== President Kathleen Spencer ===
- President in: Nikita
- Former Vice President to President Charles Grayson, who succeeded him to the position after his resignation after failure to endorse a peace treaty.
- At the G20 Economic Summit she is taken hostage by the secret organisation named The Invisible Hand and replaced with an identical decoy, who later commits suicide in the Oval Office and frames government operative Nikita Mears (Maggie Q) for her assassination, in conjunction with corrupt members of the United States Secret Service.
- It is later revealed the real Kathleen Spencer has been imprisoned by The Invisible Hand in a covert prison cell in Dubai, and is later rescued by Mears.
- Played by: Michelle Nolden
- Party: Unspecified

=== President Richard John Splett ===
- President in: Veep
- Second African American to hold the office after Kemi Talbot.
- Born and raised in Lurlene, Iowa to a Catholic family.
- Attended both Yale University and the Illinois Institute of Technology, where he graduated with doctorates in both constitutional law and veterinary medicine, respectively.
- Married to First Lady Annette Splett.
- Worked as a political assistant and adviser in Washington, D.C. early in his career, serving in the administration of President Selina Meyer, most notably in the Meyer campaign's efforts to win Nevada's Electoral College votes via a statewide recount in 2016, as well as working for future Vice President Jonah Ryan, including as his Communications Director during his election campaign to become U.S. Congressman for New Hampshire's 2nd district and as his chief of staff.
- Following Selina Meyer's departure from office, Splett worked for her private office and assisted both the Meyer and Ryan campaigns during the 2020 primaries.
- Briefly served as the Mayor of Lurlene, Iowa, his home town, after the previous ceremonial mayor, a dog, died when Selina Meyer fed it an unwanted chocolate. His supervision of first response efforts after a cropduster crashed into a 7-Eleven saw him praised as a hero and his profile raised to a national level. Dan Egan became Splett's self-appointed Chief of Staff following his dismissal from Meyer's 2020 presidential campaign.
- After he was approached by lobbyist Sidney Purcell to run for a seat in the Iowa Senate to advance the interests of a large pesticide company, he inadvertently disclosed that various members of the Iowa State Government including the Lieutenant Governor were accepting bribes whilst announcing to the press his decision not to run.
- After the arrest of the incumbent, he is selected by Governor of Iowa Ballentine to serve as the new Lieutenant Governor albeit to sideline him through makework assignments out of fear that Splett was endeavouring to usurp him.
- He ascended to the governorship after Governor Ballentine became blind and brain damaged after contracting shingles during a meeting with Jonah Ryan, who had contracted chickenpox.
- Delivered the keynote speech at his party's 2020 National Convention, where he also served as a superdelegate and was described as the "future face of the party".
- Served as the United States Secretary of Agriculture during the second presidency of Selina Meyer from 2021 to 2025 at the behest of Jonah Ryan. He fired Dan Egan as a condition of this appointment, thus prompting Egan to abandon politics in favour of a career in real estate.
- Elected as president in 2040, he was awarded the Nobel Peace Prize for brokering a genius Three State Solution which curbed conflict in the Middle East.
- After his landslide re-election in 2044, he attends the funeral of former President Selina Meyer at her presidential library at Smith College, Massachusetts.
- Acted as a sperm donor for Catherine Meyer and Majorie Palmiotti in the conception their son, who is also called Richard (Catherine and Majorie wished to raise him gender-neutral with a gender-neutral name, but Meyer announced to the press that the baby's name was Richard).
- Implied to have been raised believing that his mother was his aunt and that his grandparents were his parents (having come to that conclusion himself).
- In a non-canonical Vulture article written by David Mandel in 2020, Splett was appointed to the position of COVID-19 response co-ordinator by President Meyer (despite the outbreak in the United States taking place during what would have been President Montez's time in office).
- Political Party: Democratic (implied)
- Portrayed by: Sam Richardson

=== President Springhead ===
- President in: The Firesign Theatre's album: I Think We're All Bozos on This Bus
- Played by: Phil Austin
- A computer-controlled automaton, with a voice similar to Richard Nixon, answering questions from visitors to a World's Fair-like exhibition.
- The President is "broken" when a visitor asks it a question that has no answer "Why does the porridge bird lay his eggs in the air?".

=== President Rebecca Staba ===
- President in the Black Tide Rising series by John Ringo, starting in Book 4 Strands of Sorrow
- Former lieutenant governor of Oklahoma, who ran in the primaries for the 2012 election and failed to achieve the nomination, but was chosen as running mate due to her conservative views balancing out the candidate (who is unnamed by the books), who is more centrist.
- Is serving as vice president when the H7D3 virus causes a zombie apocalypse. When the plague hits a tipping point and society collapses, her security detail attempts to evacuate her and her family to the Raven Rock Mountain Complex, but are unable to escape DC due to sheer number of infected. Instead, they make their way to the Federal Emergency Management Agency and shelter in its dedicated bunker with the remaining staff.
- A year later, the bunker is found by Faith and Sophia Smith, who are looking for anyone higher up the line of succession than Secretary of Education Elizabeth Sovrain, whose inept leadership as Acting President is undermining efforts to retake the country from the infected. Upon being informed of the situation, Staba immediately has herself sworn in as president and overrides Sovrain's actions, getting reclamation efforts back on track.
- With DC still too overrun by infected to reliably use as a capital, she relocates to the more secure Jacksonville, Florida for the foreseeable future.
- Appoints Faith and Sophia's father Steve, the commander of the Wolf Squadron militia that spearheaded efforts to rebuild society, to serve as Secretary of Defense. She also selects Steve's wife Stacey, who handled Wolf Squadron's civilian administration, to be her Vice-President.
- Makes some changes to the restored federal government in order to make it more efficient for the ongoing crisis, including restructuring the Defense Department into the Departments of War, Army and Navy, and folding the Departments of Transportation, Housing and Urban Development, and Agriculture into the Department of the Interior.
- Upon learning about the Betas, infected humans who are no longer aggressive but have lost most higher intelligence, she reluctantly makes the judgement call to order them treated as serfs, as they will die without being cared for but will never function as normal people again, and this way they can be protected from enslavement and abuse.
- Has a husband, Dave, and three children, son Thomas and daughters Christy and Sherry.
- Party: Republican

=== President Stanfield ===
- President in: The Trojan Horse
- Played by: Tom Skerritt
- He attempts to justify an invasion of Saudi Arabia in order to halt China's oil supply.

=== President James Stanford ===
- President in: xXx: State of the Union
- Played by: Peter Strauss
- His Secretary of Defense, George Deckert leads an unsuccessful military coup to assassinate him and seize power.
- After Deckert's demise, Stanford gives the Medal of Honor to those that saved him while quoting Tupac Shakur: "Wars come and go, but my soldiers stay eternal."
- Party: Possibly Democratic

=== President Stanton ===
- President in: The Pet Shop of Horror Manga story Dual
- Uses a mystic element to become President of the United States.
- Vice President to President Manheim, and served during World War II.
- Is chosen by the mystic element to become President to use the Atomic Bomb to end the war.

=== President Arch Stanton ===
- President in: Planetfall
- Played by: Ted V. Mikels

=== President Jack Stanton ===
- President in: Primary Colors, book by Joe Klein and (movie, 1998)
- Stanton is a Democratic governor of a southern state. He appears to be a charming and philandering politician. He eats junk food and is portrayed as a thinly disguised pastiche of Bill Clinton.
- Played by: John Travolta
- Party: Democratic

=== President Roger Stanton ===
- President in: The Pet Shop of Horror Manga Story "Dual"
- An irresponsible and womanizing Former Congressman from California.
- Grandson of the President Stanton who ended World War II.
- Buys a mystic element to enhance his political career.
- The element puts the mind of his noble chief of staff into his body after an accident.
- As President he is a good husband and father, and leads the United States to its greatest power and influence.

=== President Richard Starkey ===
- President in: The Postman (movie, 1997)
- Unseen fictional president of a post-apocalyptic America attempting to rebuild, created by Kevin Costner's character.
- Note: Richard Starkey is the actual name of Beatles drummer Ringo Starr.

=== President Joseph Staton ===
- President in: American Dreamz
- 2nd term president and guest judge on a weekly talent show.
- Character is a thinly veiled parody of George W. Bush.
- Played by: Dennis Quaid

=== President Thomas M. Staver ===
- President in: No Man's World by Martin Caidin
- In office in 1971.
- President as United States attempts to establish presence on Moon, where Soviet Union has had bases for three years.

=== President Mike Stearns ===
- President in: The 1632 series created by Eric Flint
- Serves from 1632 to 1635.
- Party: Fourth of July
- Former prize fighter and regional president of a mine workers' union.
- After the town of Grantville, West Virginia is thrown back in time to 17th-century Holy Roman Empire, during the Thirty Years' War, Stearns' leadership peacefully annexes dozens of central German cities and their environs to create the New United States.
- After unrest threatens to dissolve the loose Confederated Principalities of Europe of which the New United States is a powerful member, Stearns, in cooperation with its monarch Gustav II Adolf, becomes the founding Prime Minister of the nominally republican United States of Europe.

=== President Joe Steele ===
- President in: Joe Steele (novel, 2015) and (short story, 2003) of the same name by Harry Turtledove
- An alternate history version of Joseph Stalin in which his parents emigrated to the United States.
- Steele becomes a Democratic congressman from Fresno, California.
- After bringing about the death of Franklin D. Roosevelt in a fire at the Governor's Mansion, Steele is elected President of the United States in the 1932, defeating incumbent Herbert Hoover.
- He creates a brutal dictatorship while in office.
- Remains president for six terms and defeats:
  - Alf Landon in 1936
  - Wendell Willkie in 1940
  - Thomas E. Dewey in 1944
  - Harold Stassen in 1948
  - Robert A. Taft in 1952
- In the short story, Steele runs unopposed in 1944, 1948 and 1952.
- Serves until his death from a stroke on March 5, 1953, and is succeeded by his 84-year-old vice president John Nance Garner.
- In the short story, Garner is overthrown and executed shortly into his term by J. Edgar Hoover, who becomes another dictatorial president.
- In the novel, Garner take over, but is impeached and retires to Texas while Hoover becomes the director of the United States.

=== President Thomas Steele ===
- President in: Shadowrun role-playing game
- Presidential term 2053–2057.
- Succeeds after President Alan Adams dies one day after his second inauguration in 2053.
- 5th UCAS President | 51st US President.
- Speaker of the House Betty Jo Pritchard succeeds him in 2057 after the UCAS House of Representatives declares the UCAS Presidential Election of 2056 invalid, cancelling the second inauguration of incumbent President Thomas Steele and his VP-elect.
- Party: Democratic

=== President Diane Steen ===
- President in: Mafia!
- Married unknowingly to the nation's biggest mob boss.
- Played by: Christina Applegate

=== President Bryan Stegmeyer ===
- President in: Mobile Suit Gundam 00
- Effective leader of the Union of Solar Energy and Free Nations.
- Voiced by: Masayuki Omoro (Japanese); Brian Drummond (English)

=== President Joseph Steppens ===
- President in the Extended Directors Cut of: Salt
- Former United States Speaker of the House who succeeds President Howard Lewis, who is killed in the PEOC by a Soviet/Russian sleeper agent masquerading as a CIA officer and does not have an incumbent Vice President after the recent death of Maxwell Oates.
- Parents and sister were killed in a plane crash in Russia in 1974, and like protagonist Evelyn Salt it is implied that the real Joseph Steppens also died in that crash and is replaced by a Soviet sleeper agent.
- Announced that President Steppens will travel to Moscow for a summit, and visit the site where his "family" died.

=== President Sterling ===
- President in: Dr. Dolittle: Tail to the Chief
- He has a daughter, Courtney (played by Elise Gatien).
- Played by: Peter Coyote

=== President David T. Stevens ===
- President in: Twilight's Last Gleaming (movie, 1977) based on Viper Three (novel, 1971) by Walter Wager
- A group of military convicts seizes control of an ICBM complex and demands:
  - $10 million.
  - The release of top secret documents regarding the Vietnam War.
  - and President Stevens as a hostage.
- President Stevens agrees to the demands, and gets the Secretary of Defense to promise he will release the documents should anything happen to him.
- The President is fatally wounded during a rescue attempt outside of the missile complex, and realizes at the last moment of his life that the Secretary of Defense will not release the documents.
- Played by: Charles Durning

=== President Stevenson ===
- President in: Veep
- Likely succeeded Ronald Reagan (the most recent real-life President mentioned in the series) and first elected in 1988.
- Mentioned by Selina Meyer as having a "bizarre indifference to Apartheid".
- In the episode "Library", he is seen attending the opening of the Stuart Hughes Presidential Library and Museum in 2018, catching Selina Meyer in a recreation of the Oval Office sitting at a cordoned-off replica of the Resolute desk.
- Played by: Robert Pine

=== President James Edward Stevenson ===
- President in: Turning Point: Fall of Liberty
- Nazi Supporter.
- Former Speaker of the House.
- He becomes the 35th President in 1953 after President Thomas E. Dewey and Vice President Haley resign after the Nazi's invasion of the East Coast of the United States.
- His first act in office is ordering all American armed forces and resistance groups to stand down.
- The American Resistance assassinates him.

=== President Jim Stevens ===
- President in: Term Limits by Vince Flynn
- Very corrupt.
- His administration disaffects anti-government special forces veterans.
- Party: likely Democratic

=== President Tom Stewart ===
- President in: Hitman: Blood Money
- Pro-cloning president, targeted by "The Franchise" who want to maintain their own covert cloning program.
- His Vice President Spaulding Burke is killed in a car crash organized by "The Franchise, who then after get Daniel Morris nominated to the VP position.
- Attempted assassination is helped by his own vice president, Daniel Morris.
- President Stewart is to be assassinated in the White House by Mark Parchezzi III before Agent 47 intervenes.
- Plans to nominate third VP after Morris's death, but says he will not let Congress dictate his decision.
- Has strong support and high approval ratings, and defeats anti-cloning Democratic candidate, Frank Morgan, in the general election.
- Party: Republican

=== President Digby R. Stewart ===
- President in: The Andropov Deception by Brian Crozier
- Former Actor, and close ally of British Prime Minister Brenda Barclay.

=== President Greg Stillson ===
- President in: The Dead Zone
- His Presidency and role is starting a nuclear Armageddon which is foreseen by psychic Johnny Smith.
- Stillson's presidency is prevented when Smith attempts to assassinate him during his run for Congress and he shields himself with a child.
- Party: Third Party Christian Conservative
- Played by: Martin Sheen

=== President Brandon Stokes ===
- President in While Justice Sleeps by Stacey Abrams
- War hero before being elected President
- Party: Republican
- Opposes merger between biotech companies Advar and Genworks
- Plots assassination of Supreme Court Justice Howard Wynn
- Illegally funds biowarfare programs

=== President Jim Stonecold ===
- President in: .hack
- 44th President of the United States
- Resigns from office in January 2006 after the "Pluto's Kiss" computer virus brings about the collapse of the modern internet and nearly causes a nuclear catastrophe by activating the United States' nuclear defense and automated counter-strike systems on December 24, 2005.

=== President B. D. Stonefeller ===
- President in: Battlefront of the Great Powers by Uruma Natsuko
- 92nd President of the United States.
- Formerly a colonel of the United States Armed Forces.
- Fierce rival of Long Yinying, the 31st President of China, as the United States are ranked 2nd and envy China's first place in the Global Ranking. Stonefeller is very ambitious, and funds much research on the Theseus Cells with the objective of creating an army of World-End Heroes, in order to prevail over the other nations.
- During the Nation-Toppling Battle in year 2207, the United States fight China in the first round, and the winning nation gets to claim one prize of its choosing from the loser. Stonefeller decides to claim all of China's confidential information if the USA wins: every little secret on every Chinese citizen, past, present and future. Stonefeller's motivation is that he does not want to destroy China, but to shame them on the national stage and bring them down from the top spot of the Global Ranking.
- Stonefeller is an intelligent man, deducing the presence of spies in his recent military transfers because of data illegally collected in several facilities.
- He shows to be pretty caring towards his country's World-End Hero, Aiden D. Adams. As Aiden was defeated by Chinese World-End Hero Hui Xiyi in the Nation-Toppling Battle, Stonefeller immediately intervened to beg Xiyi not to kill Aiden, and accepted his loss.
- He is also an honorable man. He fully accepts his defeat in the Nation-Toppling Battle and its consequences, notably on his approval rating among American citizens. He takes responsibility and pledges to protect all Americans more than ever.
- His Vice-President, Daniel S. Barkley, seems to wish the President's spot. He calls Stonefeller and warns him to prepare for his "inevitable downfall" after their defeat.

=== President Bridget Strand ===
- President in: Death Stranding
- First female president and last president of the United States before the Death Stranding event.
- President of the surviving 'United Cities of America' until her death.
- Adoptive mother of the game's protagonist, Sam Porter Bridges
- Played by:
  - Lindsay Wagner (likeness and older voice)
  - Emily O'Brien (younger voice)

=== President Martin Suarez ===
- President in: DC Universe, as of DC Universe Decisions (2008)
- He is publicly endorsed by Bruce Wayne as an attempt by Batman to get close to Suarez's campaign to uncover an assassination attempt.
- Party: Democratic

=== President Patrick J. Sullivan ===
- President in: My Uncle the Alien
- Played by: Dink O'Neal

=== President Danielle Sutton ===
- President in G20
- Former Captain in the United States Army who fought in the Battle of Fallujah in the Iraq War. A photograph of her evacuating a child from a bombed building was published on the cover of Time Magazine. She also earned a Purple Heart for her actions.
- Married to First Gentleman Derek Sutton, a fellow military veteran, and has two children; First Daughter Serena Sutton and First Son Demetrius Sutton.
- Cabinet and cabinet level officials include Vice President is Harold Moseley, Secretary of the Treasury Joanna Worth, Director of the Central Intelligence Agency Mikkelson and Chairman of the Joint Chiefs of Staff General Paulson.
- Whilst attending the G20 summit in Cape Town, the venue is captured by mercenaries led by Edward Rutledge, a former Australian Special Forces soldier, who were originally hired to provide additional security to the summit alongside the United States Secret Service. Sutton's Counter Assault Team, and bodyguards from several other nations, are killed in the takeover.
- Sutton is able to escape the mercenaries with her Secret Service bodyguard Manny Ruiz, as well as British Prime Minister Oliver Everett, First Lady of South Korea Han Min-Seo and Managing Director of the IMF Elena Romano, whilst the rest of the world leaders are captured.
- Rutledge forces the hostages to read a pangram, allowing his team to create deepfake recordings of them making statements against cryptocurrency. This causes mass worldwide crypto investments and a stock crash, increasing the value of Rutledge's bitcoin wallet and investments from shorting the markets. He also executes Prime Minister of Australia Lowe, and President of South Korea Lee Young-Ho to try and draw Sutton out.
- Sutton allows Romano and Everett escape in The Beast whilst she and Ruiz fight the mercenaries. She eventually gives herself up to Rutledge when he threatens to kill her husband. A team of SAPS Special Task Force operatives breach the hotel and kill the remaining hostiles. Sutton fights Rutledge as he tries to escape, ultimately knocking him off a helipad to his death.
- After the events of the takeover, Treasury Secretary Joanna Worth is arrested as a co-conspirator of Rutledge, having been partially motivated to betray her county after losing to Sutton in the presidential primaries.
- Played by: Viola Davis
- Party: Unspecified

=== President Paxton S. Superstoe ===
- President in: Superstoe by William Borden

=== President Not Sure (Joe Bauers) ===
- President in: Idiocracy
- Real name: Joe Bauers
- Mistakenly renamed "Not Sure" upon registering for American citizenship.
- Born sometime in the 20th Century.
- While working as an army librarian, Bauers takes part in a military experiment which planned to freeze him for one year, however, due to an accident, he is frozen for 500 years.
- As Secretary of the Interior under President Camacho, Bauers helps end a major Dust Bowl.
- At the end of the movie Bauers succeeds Camacho as president.
- Portrayed by Luke Wilson

=== Dr. Wilbur Daffodil-11 Swain ===
- President in: Slapstick by Kurt Vonnegut
- Last President of the United States and King of Manhattan.
- He gives everyone new middle names that are nouns followed by a number hence his middle name "Daffodil-11". If someone has the same name and number they are your brother or sister, if they have the same name but different number it means they are a cousin. This system was designed to give people relatives and always have family. This system ultimately destroys the country because the families would start flocking to states and joining up and ignoring laws and creating their own communities.

=== President Gifford Swansea ===
- President in: The Probability Broach as part of the North American Confederacy series by L. Neil Smith
- The United States becomes a Libertarian state after a successful Whiskey Rebellion and George Washington being overthrown and executed by firing squad for treason in 1794.
- Serves as the eleventh President of the North American Confederacy.
- Presidential term 1852–1856.
- Arthur Downing succeeds him and he serves from 1856 until his death in 1859.

=== President June Syers ===
- President in: The Kid Who Became President by Dan Gutman
- She says that she will be the second Franklin Delano Roosevelt.
- She is the first woman and African American president.
- Term Length: January 2002-unknown.
- Party: Lemonade (fictional party)

=== President (Succession) ===
- President in Succession
- Never referred to by name in the series, but is mainly called "The Raisin" or "The Shrivelled California Raisin".
- Implied to be a native of California based on his nickname.
- Is close friends with Scottish-American media mogul Logan Roy, who helped him get elected via favourable coverage on his conservative network news channel ATN. During his administration, Senior Press Aide Michelle-Anne Vanderhoven often acts as a go-between for the President and Roy.
- He is initially reciprocal with Roy, assisting in dealing with FCC red tape. However, as the series progresses, the President eventually becomes more distant, and does not intervene when the Department of Justice and FBI begin investigating criminal wrongdoings by Roy's companies.
- Ultimately decides not to run for re-election, resulting in his Vice President David Boyer trying and failing to court Roy's endorsement as his successor.
- Succeeded by Jeryd Mencken, an alt-right politician endorsed by Roy who narrowly beats Democratic nominee Daniel Jimenez.
- Political party: Republican

== T ==
=== President Oluwakemi 'Kemi' Talbot ===
- Former President in Veep
- First African-American to hold the office.
- Third female president after Selina Meyer and Laura Montez.
- Born in Queens, New York City to a Nigerian mother and Norwegian father.
- Involved in a serious car accident when she is 16, which resulting in the decapitation and death of her then boyfriend.
- Graduates summa cum laude from both Columbia University and Columbia Law School.
- Marries Gordon Talbot, and has two adopted children; Lars and Abebi.
- Former political roles include:
  - Queens District Attorney
  - United States Attorney for the Southern District of New York
  - Member of the New York City Council
  - Queens Borough President
  - New York State Senator
  - United States Senator from New York.
- She is originally set to win the South Carolina primary, but Meyer in collusion with China rigs it in her favour through voter suppression targeting African American voters.
- Attempts to win the party nomination for president in 2020 during the brokered National Convention in Charlotte, North Carolina, but loses to former President Selina Meyer due to a number of compromising deals including promising to overturn same-sex marriage and appointing the populist, nativist Jonah Ryan as running mate. This is so that Meyer could avoid appointing Talbot as running mate (or to serve as Talbot's running mate herself).
- Is elected sometime between 2024 and 2040 for two consecutive terms.
- Attends the funeral of former President Selina Meyer in 2045, where she delivers the main eulogy.
- Political Party: Democratic (implied)
- Played by: Toks Olagundoye

=== President John Tanner ===
- President in the updated version of the Games Designer Workshop roleplaying game Twilight 2000.
- A former governor of California, Tanner is elected in 1992 after George Bush decides not to run for a second term.
- In 1995, war breaks out between the Soviet Union and China, and in 1997 the war spreads to Europe.
- President Tanner is killed in the crash of Air Force One on Thanksgiving Day during a nuclear strike on Washington.
- His Vice President, Deanna Pembroke, is killed in the same attack and he is succeeded by Speaker of the House Munson.
- Party: Democratic

=== President Darius Tanz ===
- President in Salvation
- First British American President.
- Born to British parents on holiday in Philadelphia, which gives him birthright US citizenship in addition to British citizenship, thus rendering him eligible to hold the offices of Vice President and later President pursuant to Article 2 Section 1 of the United States Constitution.
- Billionaire aerospace scientist and founder of Tanz Industries, which undertakes projects such as planning the Ark mission to Mars.
- Enlisted to aid the United States government in preventing a large asteroid from colliding with Earth and causing an extinction level event, as well as help against the rogue hacker group RE/SYST who aim to pit the United States and Russia against each other in the lead up to the collision.
- Appointed as vice president by President Pauline Mackenzie after the arrest of treacherous former vice president Monroe Bennett, primarily due to his non-political background, scientific knowledge and public popularity during the crisis. He is approved in an emergency sitting of Congress by a two thirds majority.
- Becomes President under the 25th Amendment after President Pauline Mackenzie is assassinated by a sniper after delivering a speech at the "Unity Rally".
- Nominates two term congressman and former NASA shuttle pilot Trey Thompson as his Vice President.
- When the railgun project his administration is working on to destroy the Samson asteroid is sabotaged by a doomsday cult, he resigns the presidency to focus his full attention on other options, and is replaced by Thompson.
- Secret Service codename: Goliath.
- Political Party: Independent (presumed)
- Played by: Santiago Cabrera

=== President Taqu'il ===
- President in Frisky Dingo
- A superstar gangster rapper, he gains the Presidency through the Supreme Court, because the Democratic and Republican candidates, supervillain Killface, and billionaire superhero Xander Crews, respectively, are deemed ineligible
- Voiced by Killer Mike

=== President Allison Taylor ===
- 50th President in: 24
- 2013–2014.
- First female president; resigns at the end of Day 8 following a peace treaty conspiracy.
- Former United States Senator from Missouri; she wins the seat formerly held by her father.
- Played by: Cherry Jones
- Party: Republican

=== President Edward Taylor ===
- President in Impact, a 2008 television mini-series.
- President during a world threatening crisis caused by the collision of a brown dwarf star with the Moon.
- Played by Steven Culp

=== Acting President Nathan Templeton ===
- In Commander In Chief
- Speaker of the House who becomes Acting President for approximately one day, because President Mackenzie Allen (to whom he is a leading political foe) suffers a ruptured appendix requiring several hours of surgery and at least a day of recovery.
- With his new position of power, he quickly forces an end to the airline labor strikes, undoing Allen's weeks of careful negotiations.
- He later returns to speakership.
- Played by: Donald Sutherland
- Party: Republican

=== President Tempus ===
- President in Lois & Clark: The New Adventures of Superman.
- A recurring villain in the series.
- Born in a distant future utopia, he hates the boredom of his society, and intends to prevent its rise by killing Superman.
- Played by Lane Davies

=== President Ben Tennyson ===
- President in the Ben 10: Ultimate Alien episode "Ben 10,000 Returns".
- Becomes the president prior to this episode.
- Note that this would make the tagline "20 years from now" inaccurate, as that would make him 36 years old, and thus unqualified Constitutionally to have been elected. (minimum age is 35) However, "President of Earth" may have different qualifications.
- His tenure lasts "Just long enough to defeat the third Vilgaxian invasion".
- Voiced by: John DiMaggio

=== President Gwen Tennyson ===
- President in: Ben 10,000 Returns
- Succeeds President Ben Tennyson prior to this episode.
- Note that this would makes the tagline "20 years from now" inaccurate, as that would make her 36 years old, and thus unqualified Constitutionally to have been elected. (minimum age is 35) However, "President of Earth" may have different qualifications.

=== President Trey Thompson ===
- President in CBS television series Salvation
- First African American President.
- Holds a degree in mathematics and is a graduate of the United States Air Force Academy.
- Works for NASA for many years as a Space Shuttle pilot.
- Goes into politics after retiring from NASA, and is elected to two terms as a congressman, enjoying an 80% approval rating in his district.
- Selected to become Vice President by President Darius Tanz. Chosen over Michigan Senator Mitch Gitlow due to his reputation as a "straight shooter" and willingness to confront President Tanz on issues when needed.
- Ascends to the presidency under the provisions of the 25th Amendment when President Tanz resigns to devote his full-time to preventing the Samson asteroid from crashing to Earth.
- Played by James Lesure

=== President Daniel Thompson ===
- President in Earth: Final Conflict.
- In the early 21st Century an alien race called the Ta'Lon arrive on Earth with a hidden agenda.
- President Thompson is supported by the Ta'Lon over industrialist Jonathan Doors, and is shot in a staged assassination attempt to ensure his re-election.
- Once re-elected President Thompson agrees to Ta'Lon instigating Martial Law.

=== President Thompson ===
- President in "The Third World War" by General Sir John Hackett (1978).
- A former governor of South Carolina.
- A Conservative who defeats incumbent Vice President Walter Mondale in 1984 after President Jimmy Carter is elected to a second term.
- President during the sixteen-day Third World War which ends with the nuclear destruction of Birmingham in England, and Kiev in the Soviet Union
- Party: Republican

=== Mr. Thompson ===
- President in: Atlas Shrugged
- Never actually referred to as president, only as head of state, but the office is implied from context (he heads the government of the United States and is based in Washington D.C.).
- Thompson presides over a series of socialist reforms (or at least, social-democratic) and attempts to compromise with John Galt, but Galt is not willing to do so. Galt offers that Thompson abolish Income Tax, but Thompson is not willing to do that. Eventually, due to Galt to taking away all the capable people on whom the economy depends, the United States collapses into total chaos and famine.
- After which Galt and his friends would reconstruct it on a strict capitalist free enterprise base, and whoever survives the cataclysm will have to accept that. The ultimate personal fate of Thompson is not specified.

=== President Thomas Nathaniel Thorn ===
- President in several novels by Dale Brown
- Elected in 2000. First third-party candidate to win since Lincoln.
- Notable for his "Fortress America" policy, in which he withdraws all troops deployed overseas and refuses to deploy troops unless America's interests are directly threatened.
- Also notable for strict adherence to the Constitution, e.g. ignores inauguration ceremony at Congress and does not appoint a National Security Advisor.
- Doesn't stand for re-election after a Russian nuclear attack on America.
- Party Affiliation: Jeffersonian (fictional third party)

=== President Thornton ===
- President in The Pooch and the Pauper, 2000 TV movie.
- Played by Fred Willard

=== President Zachary Thornton ===
- President in: Capital Mysteries by Ron Roy

=== President Daniel Churchill Thorpe ===
- President in the TV mini-series World War Three (1982)
- A hardline conservative, President Thorpe institutes a grain embargo of the Soviet Union.
- Dies in office, and is replaced by Thomas McKenna.

=== President Thurston ===
- President in: The Emberverse series, by S. M. Stirling.
- After the sudden failure of modern technology causes the collapse of society, Thurston - a former member of the US military - manages to set up a government in Boise, Idaho.
- With himself as president he hopes to eventually re-unite the entire former territory of the US and refuses to recognize the numerous new nations which arose out of the chaos
- Once proven wrong, however, he easily admits he is at fault. But when declaring the next President should be elected, he is assassinated by his son Martin Thurston, who sets himself up as president.

=== President Todd ===
- President in: Quantico
- He is kidnapped with the First Lady Elaine Todd by a terrorist group in the midst of a G-20 Summit.
- The First Lady is eventually murdered during the kidnapping.
- A crisis is introduced, forcing the president to resign.
- Party: Unknown
- Played by: Danny Johnson

=== President Rupert Justice Tolliver ===
- President in Rides a Pale Horse, a novel by Franklin Allen Lieb.
- Former minister and Governor of Texas.
- Defeats Vice President Sandman in the 2000 Election.
- Begins a military buildup, and a campaign against terrorist states.
- The same conspiracy that assassinated President Kennedy has the same assassin kill President Tolliver.
- Party: Republican

=== President John Tomarchio ===
- President in: Jericho (2006 TV series).
- As junior senator from Wyoming, Tomarchio belongs to a small group of U.S. government officials who survive a series of nuclear attacks on two dozen American cities.
- Originally one of six people competing for the presidency after the attacks, he eventually manages to become leader of the new Allied States of America (ASA), which contains most of the former U.S. territory west of the Mississippi.
- Tomarchio's increasingly authoritarian administration turns out to be infiltrated and controlled by the criminal Jennings & Rall company
- Towards the end of the series a Second American Civil War between the ASA and the other successor governments of the U.S. seems to be on the horizon.
- Played by: George Newbern.

=== President Averell Torrent ===
- President in: Empire, by Orson Scott Card
- Formerly a professor at Princeton University
- Is attributed throughout the book as being a moderate, with no real polarized political stance
- In an interview before the election Torrent is asked if he will run for the Republicans, the party for which he recently served as National Security Advisor, but he responds that he will only run for the presidency if elected in primaries by both parties (i.e., the Democrats and Republicans) which he eventually is.
- Elected in place of President Nielson near the end of the book

=== President Veronica Townshend ===
- President briefly referenced in Moonfall by Jack McDevitt
- A former economics professor from the University of Oregon, junior senator from Oregon, and Secretary of Education under the Hamlin administration.
- First female president
- Wins the election of 2016 following the presidency of Andrew Culpepper.
- During her administration, the space shuttle Atlantis II is marooned in space after deflecting off of the Earth's atmosphere and goes careening towards the sun. The astronauts on-board remain in contact with NASA until their oxygen supply is fully depleted.
- Chooses not to run in the 2020 election, saying that it is "Not worth it." Her vice president is nominated but loses the election to Henry Kolladner.
- Returns to her home state of Oregon after leaving office.
- Opens her presidential library in 2022.
- Party: Republican

=== President Michelle Travers ===
- President in the Netflix action thriller series The Night Agent.
- A former United States representative, senator and member of the Senate Intelligence Committee, Travers is elected president in 2020.
- Her vice president is Ashley Redfield, a former governor of Wisconsin, who in 2023 conspires with a private military contractor, Gordon Wick, to have Travers assassinated due to her attempting to establish relations with Omar Zadar, the leader of the radical Peoples Independence Front (PIF) in an unnamed Balkan country.
- Previously, in 2022, Redfield and Wick had staged a terrorist attack in DC in an attempt to kill Zadar. When this failed, Redfield informed White House Chief of Staff Diane Farr, who agreed to help cover it up to protect Travers.
- However, Redfield and Wick continue to operate as rogues and soon freeze Farr out. Redfield and Wick target Travers for assassination at Camp David during a meeting with Zadar, using bombs placed by rogue Secret Service agents.
- Travers is ultimately rescued by FBI Special Agent Peter Sutherland Jr, who had been working to expose the conspiracy. Redfield and Farr are arrested and charged for their roles, whilst Wick escapes.
- After the Camp David incident, Travers decides not to run for re-election in 2024, resulting in her party nominating the more conservative and isolationist candidate Richard Hagan, the governor of Kansas, who she refuses to endorse.
- Political Party: Unspecified (implied to be a moderate Republican)
- Portrayed by: Kari Matchett.

=== President Mary Rose Tremane ===
- President in Deadlands: Hell on Earth role playing game.
- Elected in 2078 on a platform of peaceful negotiation with the Confederate States of America.
- "Disappears" while traveling on Air Force One over the Rocky Mountains on January 1, 2081.

=== President Quentin Trembley III ===
- President in: Gravity Falls
- The "8th ½" president. His existence is retroactively covered up by the government for being too silly.
- Wins the 1837 presidential race due to his opponents being crushed in a landslide.
- During his tenure, he declares war on pancakes, appoints babies to the Supreme Court, and signs the "Depantsipation Proclamation" which bans pants.
- His face appears on the -$12 bill.
- After being driven from office, Trembley founds the town of Gravity Falls and freezes himself in a block of peanut brittle for over 150 years before escaping in the present.
- Played by: Alex Hirsch

=== President Melvin Trent ===
- President in the 1967 movie In Like Flint
- Replaced with an actor double named Sebastian.
- Played by: Andrew Duggan

=== President Samuel Arthur Tresch ===
- President in: Mr. President (TV series, 1987–88)
- Former Governor of Wisconsin.
- Played by: George C. Scott

=== President Allan Trumbull ===
- Speaker of the House and Acting President in: Olympus Has Fallen
- Vice President and Acting President in: London has Fallen
- President in: Angel Has Fallen
- As Speaker of the House of Representatives of the United States in 2013, takes temporary office during the invasion at the White House. The President and Vice President are hostages so he becomes Acting President.
- As Vice President in 2016, he remains in D.C. during the trip of President Asher to London for the funeral of Prime Minister of the United Kingdom. The assassinations of key world leaders and the kidnapping of the President Asher force him to once again become Acting President.
- In 2019, he is officially president in his own right. He recommends Mike Banning (hero of the first two Has Fallen movies) to replace the director of the Secret Service. A swarm of drones attacks him on a fishing trip, leaving Banning and a comatose Trumbull the only survivors.
- Trumbull wakes up some time later. It is revealed that his VP is a conspirator in the attack. Banning is exonerated and Trumbull's VP arrested.
- Trumbull may appear in the upcoming continuation of the franchise, Night has Fallen.
- Played by: Morgan Freeman

=== President Harrison Tucker ===
- President in: The First Lady (2018), a novel by James Patterson and Brendan DuBois
- Former Senator and Governor of Ohio
- Has an affair with a lobbyist of the defense industry
- His wife gets kidnapped in the book due to an intrigue of his chief of staff, Parker Hoyt, and has to be saved by the Secret Service

=== President Thomas Nelson Tucker ===
- President in: The White House Mess (book) by Christopher Buckley
- Former Governor of Idaho.
- Marries former movie star Jessica Heath Tucker, and has one son Thomas Jr..
- Serves from 1989 to 1993.
- Attempts to give part of the Southwest U.S. to Mexico as a goodwill gesture, normalizes relations with Cuba, deals with a hostage crisis in Bermuda, and gets the U.S. Virgin Islands admitted as the 51st State.
- Loses to George H. W. Bush in 1992 in a landslide.
- Party: Democratic

=== President Rexford Tugwell ===
- President in: The Grasshopper Lies Heavy, which is in turn a work of fiction in the alternate history The Man in the High Castle (book) by Philip K. Dick; almost certainly based on the real Rexford Guy Tugwell.

=== President Turner ===
- President in: Ekipa, Polish political drama.
- Frequently mentioned in one episode "Dalej idziesz sam", during a crisis with nuclear testing in Belarus. Although he is not seen, his voice is heard when he speaks to the Polish Prime Minister via phone.

=== President Douglas Turner ===
- President in: The Case of the President by Austrian author Marc Elsberg.
- A former president, who, three years after leaving office, is arrested in Athens, Greece on behalf of the International Criminal Court for committing illegal drone strikes in Syria.
- His prosecution causes international diplomatic unrest and US Military members try to free him from prison by force to prevent his conviction in The Hague.
- He could be based on Donald Trump since he shares the same initials with him.

=== President Madeline Turner ===
- President in: The Edge of Honor and Power Curve by Richard Herman

=== President William Turner ===
- Advocates a complete withdrawal of US Military Forces from around the world, and a massive cut to the US Defense Budget.
- President during the Chinese Nuclear Attack on Japan.

=== President John P. Tweedledee ===
- President in: Let 'Em Eat Cake by George and Ira Gershwin
- Defeats incumbent John P. Wintergreen, who fails to convince the Supreme Court to nullify the election results.
- Overthrown by Wintergreen and his Blue Shirts on July 4.
- Becomes President of Cuba.

=== President Twigg ===
- President in DAG, 2001 NBC TV series.
- Wife is named Katherine, nicknamed "Mrs. President."
- Followed by President Whitman.

=== President Duncan Tyler ===
- President in the 1980 film Hangar 18
- During his re-election campaign a UFO is captured.

=== President Helen Tyler ===
- President in Modus (TV series)
- First female president
- Succeeds Barack Obama
- Married to First Gentleman Dale Tyler, and has one daughter, Zoe.
- Goes missing whilst staying in Admiralty House whilst on a state visit to Stockholm, Sweden.
- Secret Service codename: Evergreen
- Political party: Likely Democrat
- Portrayed by: Kim Cattrall
