= Debbie Dadey =

American writer (born 1959)

Debra S. Dadey (born May 18, 1959) is an American writer and co-writer of 162 books, including 74 total Bailey School Kids books co-written with Marcia Jones. These comprise 51 in the Adventures of the Bailey School Kids series, 9 Bailey School Kids Jr. Chapter Books, and 14 Bailey School Kids - Special Editions.

Dadey was born in Morganfield, Kentucky. She was a first grade teacher and librarian before becoming a full-time writer. Her award-winning "books for reluctant readers" have been published by Scholastic, Tor/Starscape Publishing, Hyperion, Bloomsbury USA, Delacorte, Walker, Willowisp, and F&W Publishing.

== Selected works ==
Nonfiction

- Story Sparkers: A creativity guide for children's writers, Dadey and Marcia Jones (Cincinnati, OH: Writer's Digest Books, 2000)

=== Fiction ===
Dadey as sole writer

- Buffalo Bill and the Pony Express, illustrated by Charlie Shaw (Note: Charles William Shaw (1941–2005). LC Online Catalog records (65) show that he illustrated books as "Charlie Shaw" for Disney Press (14) and as "Charles Shaw" otherwise (51). "Shaw, Charles, 1941-2005". Library of Congress Authorities (lccn.loc.gov). Retrieved 2017-03-24.) (Disney Press, 1994) – historical novel
- Marty the Maniac, illus. Mel Crawford (1996) – first? of a Marty series (1996–?), some illus. by Meredith Johnson
- My Mom the Frog, illus. Richard A. Williams (Scholastic Corporation, 1996)
- Bobby and the Great, Green Booger, illus. Mike Gordon (St. Petersburg, FL: Willowisp Press, 1997) – first in a Bobby series
- Shooting Star: Annie Oakley the legend, illus. Scott Goto (NY: Walker and Co., 1997)
- Will Rogers: larger than life, illus. Scott Goto (1999)
- King of the Kooties, illus. Kevin O'Malley (Walker, 1999)
- Cherokee Sister (Delacorte Press, 2000) – historical novel
- The Swamp Monster in Third Grade, illus. Margeaux Lucas (Scholastic, 2002) – first in a Swamp Monster series
- Whistler's Hollow (1st US ed., NY: Bloomsbury Children's Books, 2002) – historical novel
- Great Green Gator Graduation, illus. Margeaux Lucas (Scholastic, 2006)
- The Worst Name in Third Grade, illus. Tamara Petrosino (Scholastic, 2007) – first in a series
- A Whale of a Tale, illus. Tatevik Avakyan (Aladdin Books, 2012) – Trident Academy series, aka Mermaid Tales

Dadey with co-writers

- The Adventures of the Bailey School Kids, series (Scholastic, 1990–2009) written by Dadey and Marcia Jones, illustrated by John Steven Gurney
- Ghostville Elementary, series (Scholastic, 2003–2007), wri. Dadey and Jones, illus. Guy Francis
- The Keyholders, series (Tor Books Starscape, 2009) wri. Dadey and Jones, illus. Adam Stower
- Slime Wars, Dadey and her son Nathan Dadey, illus. Bill Basso (2003)
- Slime Time, Dadey and Nathan Dadey, illus. Bill Basso (2004)
- Triplet Trouble and the Runaway Reindeer, by Dadey and Jones, illus. John Speirs (1995) – first of a Triple Trouble series (1995–?)
