= Ron Roy =

American children's fiction writer

- Born: April 29, 1940 (age 86); Hartford, Connecticut, US
- Education: University of Connecticut (BA); University of Hartford (MA)
- Occupation: Fiction writer
- Notable work: A to Z Mysteries
- Website: https://www.ronroy.com

Ron Roy (born April 29, 1940) is an American writer of children's fiction, primarily mysteries for young readers. He is best known for the series A to Z Mysteries (from 1997), Capital Mysteries (from 2001), and Calendar Mysteries (from 2009).

Roy was born in Hartford, Connecticut, grew up in East Hartford, and has lived in Connecticut most of his life. He earned his Bachelor of Arts degree in English from the University of Connecticut and his master's degree in early childhood education from the University of Hartford. He taught fourth grade for ten years until he sold his first book in 1978 and became a full-time writer. His first several books were unpaged picture books.

== Selected works ==
=== A to Z Mysteries ===
The A to Z Mysteries are a series of chapter books for readers aged 6 to 9, comprising 26 books published from 1997 through 2005. The series is written by Ron Roy, with interior illustrations and original cover art by John Steven Gurney, and redesigned cover art (2015) by Stephen Gilpin. In each book in the series, three kids named Dink, Josh, and Ruth Rose solve a mystery set in their fictional home town of Green Lawn, Connecticut (and sometimes in other locations in the USA). The average page length of the text of each book is approximately 80 to 90 pages.

List of A to Z Mysteries books
#	Title	Published
1	The Absent Author	1997
2	The Bald Bandit	1997
3	The Canary Caper	1998
4	The Deadly Dungeon	1998
5	The Empty Envelope	1998
6	The Falcon's Feathers	1998
7	The Goose's Gold	1998
8	The Haunted Hotel	1999
9	The Invisible Island	1999
10	The Jaguar's Jewel	2000
11	The Kidnapped King	2000
12	The Lucky Lottery	2000
13	The Missing Mummy	2001
14	The Ninth Nugget	2001
15	The Orange Outlaw	2001
16	The Panda Puzzle	2002
17	The Quicksand Question	2002
18	The Runaway Racehorse	2002
19	The School Skeleton	2003
20	The Talking T-Rex	2003
21	The Unwilling Umpire	2004
22	The Vampire's Vacation	2004
23	The White Wolf	2004
24	The X'ed-Out X-Ray	2005
25	The Yellow Yacht	2005
26	The Zombie Zone	2005

=== Capital Mysteries ===
The Capital Mysteries is a chapter book series for readers aged 6 to 9, comprising 14 books published from 2001 through 2012. The series is written by Ron Roy, with interior illustrations by Timothy Bush and cover art by Greg Swearingen. In each book in the series, two kids named KC and Marshall solve a mystery set in and around their home city of Washington, D.C. The plots often involve the president himself.

List of Capital Mysteries books
#	Title	Published
1	Who Cloned the President	2001
2	Kidnapped at the Capital	2002
3	The Skeleton in the Smithsonian	2003
4	A Spy in the White House	2004
5	Who Broke Lincoln's Thumb?	2005
6	Fireworks at the FBI	2006
7	Trouble at the Treasury	2006
8	Mystery at the Washington Monument	2007
9	A Thief at the National Zoo	2008
10	The Election Day Disaster	2009
11	The Secret at Jefferson's Mansion	2009
12	The Ghost at Camp David	2010
13	Trapped on the DC Train	2011
14	Turkey Trouble on the National Mall	2012

=== Calendar Mysteries ===
The Calendar Mysteries is a chapter book series for first and second graders, comprising 13 books published from 2009 through 2014. The series is written by Ron Roy, with interior illustrations and cover art by John Steven Gurney. The main characters are cousins and younger siblings of Dink, Josh, and Ruth Rose from the A to Z Mysteries series. The average page length of the text of each book is approximately 65 pages.

List of Calendar Mysteries books
#	Title	Published	Ref.
1	January Joker	2009	
2	February Friend	2009	
3	March Mischief	2010	
4	April Adventure	2010	
5	May Magic	2011	
6	June Jam	2011	
7	July Jitters	2012	
8	August Acrobat	2012	
9	September Sneakers	2013	
10	October Ogre	2013	
11	November Night	2014	
12	December Dog	2014	
13	New Year's Eve Thieves	2014	

=== A to Z Mysteries Super Editions ===
The A to Z Mysteries Super Editions is a chapter book series for readers aged 6 to 9, published from 2006. The series is written by Ron Roy, with interior illustrations and cover art by John Steven Gurney. A continuation of the popular original A to Z Mysteries series (the final volume of which was published in 2005), the Super Editions follow Dink, Josh, and Ruth Rose as they travel to various locations around the US and solve mysteries. The average page length of the text of each book is approximately 130 pages.

List of A to Z Mysteries Super Edition books
#	Title	Published
1	Detective Camp	2006
2	Mayflower Treasure Hunt	2007
3	White House White-out	2008
4	Sleepy Hollow Sleepover	2010
5	The New Year Dragon Dilemma	2011
6	The Castle Crime	2014
7	Operation Orca	2015
8	Secret Admirer	2015
9	April Fools' Fiasco	2017
10	Colossal Fossil	2018
11	Grand Canyon Grab	2019
12	Space Shuttle Scam	2020
13	Crime in the Crypt	2021
14	Leopard on the Loose	2022
