= Marcia Jones (writer) =

American writer (born 1958)

Marcia Thornton Jones (born July 15, 1958) is an American writer of children's books, the author or co-author of more than 135 elementary chapter books, picture books, and mid-grade novels, including The Adventures of the Bailey School Kids series, among other works co-written with Debbie Dadey.

== Biography ==
Jones was born in Joliet, Illinois. She has been an elementary school teacher of first and third grades, computer lab, writing and reading, and Gifted & Talented. She has been a full-time writer since 1990. Her books are published by Scholastic, Tor, Dutton (Penguin Group), Hyperion Press (Disney), and F&W. She lives in Lexington, Kentucky with her husband Stephen.

== Works ==
Nonfiction

- Story Sparkers: A creativity guide for children's writers, by Debbie Dadey and Jones (Writer's Digest, 2000)

=== Fiction ===
Jones as sole writer

- Godzilla Ate My Homework (Scholastic Little Apple, 1997) – chapter book for young readers
- Champ (Scholastic, 2007) – children's novel
- The Tale of Jack Frost, illus. Priscilla Burris (Scholastic, 2008) – picture book
- Leprechaun on the Loose, illus. Cyd Moore (Scholastic, 2008) – picture book
- Ratfink, illus. C. B. Decker (Dutton Children's Books, 2010) – children's novel

Jones with co-writers

- Keyholders SERIES (Tor Books Starscape, Fall 2009), wri. Dadey and Jones, illus. Adam Stower
- The Adventures of the Bailey School Kids (Scholastic, 1992–present), written by Debbie Dadey and Jones, illustrated by John Steven Gurney – SERIES, 65 titles
- The Bailey School Kids Junior SERIES (Scholastic), Dadey and Jones, chapter books
- Bailey City Monsters SERIES (Scholastic), Dadey and Jones, illus. Gurney
- Ghostville Elementary SERIES (Scholastic, 2003–2007), Dadey and Jones, illus. Jeremy Tugeau (vols 1–4) and Guy Francis (illustrator) (vols 5-8)
- Triplet Trouble and the Runaway Reindeer, by Dadey and Jones, illus. John Speirs (Scholastic Corporation, 1995) – first of a Triple Trouble series (1995–?)
- Barkley's School for Dogs SERIES (Hyperion Books for Children, 2001)
- Ghost Dog, Dadey and Jones, illus. Amy Wummer (Hyperion Books for Children, 2001)
- Ghosts Do Splash in Puddles, Dadey and Jones, illus. Joëlle Dreidemy (2003)
