= Bailey School Kids =

Children's book series

The Adventures of the Bailey School Kids
- Author: Marcia Jones and Debbie Dadey
- Illustrator: John Steven Gurney
- Cover artist: John Steven Gurney; Nathan Hale
- Country: United States
- Language: English
- Genre: Adventure, fiction
- Publisher: Bardel Entertainment and Rainbow S.p.A. (formerly Scholastic Corporation)
- Published: 1990-2006
- No. of books: 83

The Adventures of the Bailey School Kids (also known as The Bailey School Kids) is an adventure fiction supernatural children's book series written by Marcia Jones and Debbie Dadey. The illustrations and character design were done by John Steven Gurney, with some of the covers re-illustrated in 2000 by Nathan Hale. The series is intended for grades 2 to 4 and was published by Bardel Entertainment and Rainbow S.p.A (who attained the rights from Scholastic Corporation).

In each story, the Bailey School kids encounter a relatively ordinary character (such as a school teacher, custodian, etc.) who, unbeknownst to them, may or may not be a mythical being (e.g. a vampire, werewolf, dragon, etc.). This often entails a backstory about the history of the supposed "mythical being" and what they are doing in Bailey City, but whether the character is actually a mythical being is left ambiguous.

The series consists of 83 books, including Super Specials, Holiday Special Editions, the BSK "Jr" chapter books series, and the spin-off series Bailey City Monsters. The first novel, Vampires Don't Wear Polka Dots, was published in 1990.

== Main characters ==
- Howard ("Howie") is a logical and intelligent boy who looks for logical solutions to problems and provides advice to his friends. His dad works for FATS (Federal Aeronautics Technology Station). His parents are divorced.
- Melody is a brave girl in the group who is also very competitive with Eddie and tends to act protective of her best friend Liza when Eddie teases or makes fun of her.
- Elizabeth ("Liza") is an easily scared and sensitive girl and is the best friend of Melody. She avoids getting into situations into which someone might get hurt. She always believes in fairy tales, and she cannot swim.
- Edward ("Eddie") is a "tough guy" who always makes fun of his friends, particularly Melody and Liza and finds ways to cause a nuisance particularly during class which often results in him being scolded by Mrs. Jeepers.

== Recurring characters ==
- Mrs. Jeepers is the third grade teacher at Bailey Elementary, with some of the students in her class thinking she is a vampiress due to her Transylvanian accent and the fact that she always wears a green brooch which she rubs whenever one of the students misbehaves in conjunction with flashing her green eyes. Other teachers before her quit due to the student's behaviour, but Mrs. Jeepers is the only one who can keep them under control due to them being afraid of her. Her family is from Transylvania, and she has a coffin-like box in her basement. Despite her bizarre family and unusual behavior, it is never revealed if she really is a vampiress. She appears in all the books in the regular series as well as the Super Special editions.
- Mr. Jenkins is the camp counselor of Camp Lone Wolf, and may or may not be a werewolf. Like Mrs. Jeepers, it is never known if he really is a werewolf. He comes off as a mean and tough man but is sometimes shown to have a soft side, especially towards nature. He has two known cousins, one who dances hula (who appears in book 36 (Werewolves Don't Hula Dance) and one who ran for president (who appears in book 49 Werewolves Don't Run for President). He is a tall and hairy man who wears torn clothes and a dog collar, has pointy ears, and often demonstrates his characteristic howl. He reappears in book 27 Mermaids Don't Run Track.
- Dr. Victor is a brilliant scientist residing in Bailey City. Some people think he is, or may be related to, the original Dr. Victor Frankenstein, leading them to believe his companion, Frank, is really Frankenstein's monster. After his first appearance, he argues with Frank, prompting the two of them to separate, but they make up later on. It is believed that he was directly responsible for the creation of "Frankenstein's Bride". He first appears in book 6 Frankenstein Doesn't Plant Petunias and later reappears in books 41 (with the main character of the book being his niece) and 47 (where he is mentioned briefly).
- Carey is the popular, rich girl in the fourth grade at Bailey Elementary. Although she comes off as a spoiled brat, she tends to care about what is going on around her, especially when it comes to Mrs. Jeepers being a "vampiress". Eddie likes to scare Carey by pulling pranks on her.

== List of books ==
=== The Adventures of the Bailey School Kids ===
Sources:

1. Vampires Don't Wear Polka Dots
2. Werewolves Don't Go To Summer Camp
3. Santa Claus Doesn't Mop Floors
4. Leprechauns Don't Play Basketball
5. Ghosts Don't Eat Potato Chips
6. Frankenstein Doesn't Plant Petunias
7. Aliens Don't Wear Braces
8. Genies Don't Ride Bicycles
9. Pirates Don't Wear Pink Sunglasses
10. Witches Don't Do Backflips
11. Skeletons Don't Play Tubas
12. Cupid Doesn't Flip Hamburgers
13. Gremlins Don't Chew Bubble Gum
14. Monsters Don't Scuba Dive
15. Zombies Don't Play Soccer
16. Dracula Doesn't Drink Lemonade
17. Elves Don't Wear Hard Hats
18. Martians Don't Take Temperatures
19. Gargoyles Don't Drive School Buses
20. Wizards Don't Need Computers
21. Mummies Don't Coach Softball
22. Cyclops Doesn't Roller-Skate
23. Angels Don't Know Karate
24. Dragons Don't Cook Pizza
25. Bigfoot Doesn't Square Dance
26. Mermaids Don't Run Track
27. Bogeymen Don't Play Football
28. Unicorns Don't Give Sleigh Rides
29. Knights Don't Teach Piano
30. Hercules Doesn't Pull Teeth
31. Ghouls Don't Scoop Ice Cream
32. Phantoms Don't Drive Sports Cars
33. Giants Don't Go Snowboarding
34. Frankenstein Doesn't Slam Hockey Pucks
35. Trolls Don't Ride Roller Coasters
36. Wolfmen Don’t Hula Dance
37. Goblins Don't Play Video Games
38. Ninjas Don't Bake Pumpkin Pie
39. Dracula Doesn't Rock And Roll
40. Sea Monsters Don't Ride Motorcycles
41. The Bride Of Frankenstein Doesn't Bake Cookies
42. Robots Don't Catch Chicken Pox
43. Vikings Don't Wear Wrestling Belts
44. Ghosts Don't Ride Wild Horses
45. Wizards Don't Wear Graduation Gowns
46. Sea Serpents Don't Juggle Water Balloons
47. Frankenstein Doesn't Start Food Fights
48. Dracula Doesn't Play Kickball
49. Werewolves Don’t Run For President
50. The Abominable Snowman Doesn't Roast Marshmallows
51. Dragons Don't Throw Snowballs

=== Bailey School Kids Super Special Editions ===
1. Mrs. Jeepers Is Missing
2. Mrs. Jeepers' Batty Vacation
3. Mrs. Jeepers' Secret Cave
4. Mrs. Jeepers In Outer Space
5. Mrs. Jeepers' Monster Class Trip
6. Mrs. Jeepers On Vampire Island
7. Mrs. Jeepers' Scariest Halloween... EVER!!!!
8. Mrs. Jeepers' Creepy Christmas
9. The Bailey School Kids - Joke Book

=== Bailey School Kids Holiday Specials ===
1. Swamp Monsters Don't Chase Wild Turkeys
2. Aliens Don't Carve Jack-O-Lanterns
3. Mrs. Claus Doesn't Climb Telephone Poles
4. Leprechauns Don't Play Fetch
5. Ogres Don't Hunt Easter Eggs

=== Bailey School Kids "Jr" Chapter Books ===
1. Ghosts DO Splash In Puddles
2. Reindeer DO Wear Striped Underwear
3. Cupid DOES Eat Chocolate-Covered Snails
4. Pirates DO Ride Scooters
5. Dragons DO Eat Homework
6. Wizards DO Roast Turkeys
7. Vampires DO Hunt Marshmallow Bunnies
8. Cavemen DO Drive School Buses
9. Snow Monsters DO Drink Hot Chocolate

=== Bailey City Monsters ===
1. The Monsters Next Door
2. Howling at The Hauntlys’
3. Vampire Trouble
4. Kilmer's Pet Monster
5. Double Trouble Monsters
6. Spooky Spells
7. Vampire Baby
8. Snow Monster Mystery
9. Happy Boo Day

=== Little Kids ===
1. SS The Hauntlys' Hairy Surprise

=== Also by Marcia Thornton Jones and Debbie Dadey ===
==== Ghostville Elementary ====
1. Ghost Class
2. Ghost Game
3. New Ghoul In School
4. Happy Haunting
5. Stage Fright
6. Happy Boo-Day to You!
7. Hide-and-Spook
8. Ghosts Be Gone!
9. Beware of the Blabbermouth!
10. Class Trip to the Haunted House
11. The Treasure Haunt
12. Frights! Camera! Action!
13. Guys and Ghouls
14. Frighting Like Cats and Dogs
15. A Very Haunted Holiday
16. Red, White and Boo!
17. No Haunting Zone!
