= Capital Mysteries =

2001–2012 children's novels by Ron Roy

- 14 books
- Author: Ron Roy
- Illustrator: Liza Woodruff (books 1–2); Timothy Bush (from book 3)
- Country: United States
- Genre: Children's novels, mystery fiction
- Publisher: Golden Books (books 1–2); Random House (from book 3)
- Published: 2001–2012
- Media type: Print (paperback)

Capital Mysteries is a series of mystery novels for young readers written by Ron Roy. It was inaugurated in 2001 with Who Cloned the President?, illustrated by Liza Woodruff and published by Golden Books. Beginning with the third volume in 2003 it was illustrated by Timothy Bush and published by Random House.

The books follow the adventures of child detectives KC Corcoran and Marshall Li, who are best friends and spend much of their time solving mysteries around the monuments of Washington D.C. KC's mother marries the fictional President Zachary Thornton in volume 4 so that KC becomes the "First Daughter" from volume 5 onward. The marriage gives both junior detectives access to the White House and other monuments when solving cases.

== Books ==
Random House acquired the book publishing rights of Golden Books Family Entertainment in a deal agreed on August 15, 2001. Evidently it continued publication under the Golden Books name at least to some time in 2002. Random House editions of books 1–2 were published in 2003.

- Who Cloned the President (Golden Books, 2001), illustrated by Liza Woodruff
- Kidnapped at the Capital (Golden, 2002), illus. Liza Woodruff
- The Skeleton in the Smithsonian (Random House, 2003), illus. Timothy Bush
- A Spy in the White House (2004)
- Who Broke Lincoln's Thumb? (2005)
- Fireworks at the FBI (2006)
- Trouble at the Treasury (2006)
- Mystery at the Washington Monument (2007)
- A Thief at the National Zoo (2008)
- The Election Day Disaster (2009)
- The Secret at Jefferson's Mansion (2009)
- The Ghost at Camp David (2010)
- Trapped on the DC Train (2011)
- Turkey Trouble on the National Mall (Random, 2012), illus. Timothy Bush

== A to Z Mysteries ==
KC and Marshall team up with the A-to-Z junior detectives Donald David "Dink" Duncan, Josh Pinto, and Ruth Rose Hathaway in White House White-Out (Random House, 2008), volume 3 of A to Z Mysteries: Super Edition written by Ron Roy and illustrated by John Steven Gurney.
