= John Steven Gurney =

American author & illustrator (born 1962)

John Steven Gurney (born 1962) is an American author and illustrator of children's books. Gurney is the author and illustrator of the picture book Dinosaur Train, as well as the Fuzzy Baseball graphic novel series. He has illustrated over 150 books, including popular series such as The Bailey School Kids, A to Z Mysteries, and the Calendar Mysteries. His work has also appeared in popular children’s magazines such as Cricket, Babybug, and Ladybird. Gurney is also an art educator. He is on the faculty at both Hollins University in Hollins, Virginia and Kutztown University of Pennsylvania in Kutztown, Pennsylvania, where he teaches illustration

== Early life and education ==
Gurney was born in 1962 in Lancaster, Pennsylvania and grew up in Bucks County, Pennsylvania. He wanted to be an illustrator since he was in kindergarten and while he was in High School, he studied privately with the renowned Illustrator William Arthur Smith. Gurney attended college at Pratt Institute in Brooklyn, NY where he received a Bachelor of Fine Arts in illustration. During the summers while attending Pratt, he drew caricatures on the boardwalk in Atlantic City, New Jersey. After graduating, he continued his studies of traditional oil painting technique at the Stevenson Academy of Fine Arts in Glen Cove, NY and at the New York Academy of Art in New York, NY. In 2017 he received his Master of Fine Arts in Illustration from the University of Hartford’s Hartford Art School where he studied with Murray Tinkelman and C.F. Payne.

== Career ==
Gurney’s work first drew national attention when he won a nationwide poster contest for Molson Golden Ale which appeared in Rolling Stone magazine. The poster depicted a skier flying through the air about to grab a glass of brew from a helpful dog, pouring the bottle. His first illustrated book followed his contest win when he illustrated William F. Buckley’s, The Temptation of Wilfred Malachey (Workman Books, 1985).

At this time, he also created illustrations for greeting cards, promotional posters for various companies, publications, and educational publishers, and drew caricatures for parties and social gatherings. After the publication of his second illustrated book, The Night Before Christmas (Scholastic, 1985), Gurney was hired to create the original covers and internal drawings for the Bailey School Kids and A to Z Mysteries series.

Gurney’s first book as author and illustrator was Dinosaur Train (Harper Collins, 2001), which was inspired by his son’s love of trains and dinosaurs. The PBS television show “Dinosaur Train” is not based on Gurney’s book, but before the show was aired the production company bought the film and TV rights to his book to avoid any potential conflicts.

Gurney’s Fuzzy Baseball graphic novel series is about The Fernwood Valley Fuzzies, a baseball team of likeable animals. In book #1 the Fuzzies play The Rocky Ridge Red Claws, in book #2 (Ninja Baseball Blast) they play The Sashimi City Ninjas, and in book #3 they play a team of robots, The Geartown Clankees. Book #4 (Dino-Hitters) is due to be published in 2021, where they play a team of dinosaurs, the Triassic Park Titans.

Gurney uses people from his hometown of Brattleboro, Vermont to pose as models for his illustrations in his chapter book series. To date, 40 individuals—children and adults—have posed as models for his illustrations.

In addition to books, Gurney illustrated one version of the Milton Bradley board game Guess Who and he illustrated the poster for the 1996 Macy’s Thanksgiving Day Parade.

The University of Findlay’s Mazza Museum has four pieces of Gurney’s illustrations in their collection.

Gurney also works as a caricature artist throughout New England and has traveled to Las Vegas and New Orleans to draw caricatures at live events.

Gurney’s artistic style often focuses on depicting animals in human situations and with human-like personality traits. His work is fun and fanciful and often tinged with a sense of humor.

== Teaching ==
Gurney travels to elementary schools around the United States and the world to give presentations to students regarding his work as an author and illustrator. He has visited schools in 33 states as well as Canada, Hungary, Poland, Saudi Arabia, Vietnam, and The Philippines.

Currently, Gurney teaches illustration at Hollins University in Hollins, VA and Kutztown University of Pennsylvania in Kutztown, PA.

== Personal life ==
Gurney lives in Brattleboro, Vermont with his wife Kathie. They have two adult children.

== Selected works (in order of publication date) ==
=== Author/illustrator ===
- Dinosaur Train (Harper Collins, 2001)
- The Bossy Pirate (Schiffer Publishing, 2018)
- Fuzzy Baseball graphic novel series (Papercrutz Publishing)
  - Fuzzy Baseball (2016)
  - #2: Ninja Baseball Blast (2019)
  - #3: RBI Robots (2020)
  - #4: Dino Hitters (expected 2021)

=== Illustrator ===
==== Picture books ====
- The Temptation of Wilfred Malachey by William F. Buckley (Workman Books, 1985)
- The Night Before Christmas by Clement Clark Moore (Scholastic, 1985)
- On Our Way to Market by Dayle Ann Dodds (Simon & Schuster, 1991)
- Over the River and Through the Woods (Scholastic, 1992)
- The Search for Sidney’s Smile by Marc Kornblatt (Simon & Schuster, 1993)
- The Hog Call to End All! by SuAnn Kiser (Orchard Books, 1994)
- Chatterbox: The Bird Who Wore Glasses by Michael E. Uslan (EE Publishing, 2006)

==== Chapter books ====
- The Worldwide Dessert Contest by Dan Elish (Orchard Books, 1988)
- Christmas Magic by Patricia Hermes (Scholastic, 1996)
- My Secret Valentine by Patricia Hermes (Scholastic, 1996)
- Something Scary by Patricia Hermes (Scholastic, 1996)
- Turkey Trouble by Patricia Hermes (Scholastic, 1996)
- Stubby and the Puppy Pack by Nikki Wallace (San Val, 2000)
- Upchuck and the Rotten Willy Running Wild by Bill Wallace (Aladdin, 2000)
- Chomps, Flea, and the Gray Cat (That’s Me) by Carol and Bill Wallace (Aladdin, 2001)
- Stubby and the Puppy Pack to the Rescue by Nikki Wallace (Simon & Schuster, 2002)
- The Meanest Hound Around by Carol and Bill Wallace (Aladdin, 2004)
- Bub Moose by Carol and Bill Wallace (Aladdin, 2014)
- Bub, Snow, and the Burly Bear Scare by Carol and Bill Wallace (Aladdin, 2014)

==== Series ====
- The Bailey School Kids Series (numbers 1 through 51) by Debbie Dadey & Marcia Thornton Jones (Scholastic, 1991-2006)
- The Bailey School Kids Super Special (numbers 1 through 7) by Debbie Dadey & Marcia Thornton Jones (Scholastic, 1996-2005)
- A to Z Mysteries (numbers 1 through 26) by Ron Roy (Random House, 1997-2005)
- The Bailey City Monsters Series (numbers 1 through 8) by Debbie Dadey & Marcia Thornton Jones (Scholastic, 1998-2000)
- The Baily City Monsters Super Special #1: The Hauntlys’ Hairy Surprise by Debbie Dadey & Marcia Thornton Jones (Scholastic, 1999)
- The Bailey School Kids Thanksgiving Special: Swamp Monsters Don’t Chase Wild Turkeys by Debbie Dadey & Marcia Thornton Jones (Scholastic, 2001)
- The Bailey School Kids Holiday Special: Aliens Don’t Carve Jack-o’-Lanterns by Debbie Dadey & Marcia Thornton Jones (Scholastic, 2002)
- The Bailey School Kids Holiday Special: Mrs. Claus Doesn’t Climb Telephone Poles by Debbie Dadey & Marcia Thornton Jones (Scholastic, 2002)
- The Bailey School Kids Holiday Special: Ogres Don’t Hunt Easter Eggs by Debbie Dadey & Marcia Thornton Jones (Scholastic, 2003)
- The Bailey School Kids Holiday Special: Leprechauns Don’t Play Fetch by Debbie Dadey & Marcia Thornton Jones (Scholastic, 2003)
- A to Z Mysteries Super Edition (numbers 1 through 13) by Ron Roy (Random House, 2006-2021)
- Big Apple Barn Series (numbers 1 through 6) by Kristin Earhart (Scholastic, 2007-2008)
- Calendar Mysteries (numbers 1 through 13) by Ron Roy (Random House, 2009-2014)
- Palace Puppies Series (numbers 1 through 4) by Laura Dower (Hyperion, 2013)
- Pet Hotel Series (numbers 1 through 4, interior illustrations only) by Kate Finch (Scholastic, 2013-2014)
