= Guy Francis =

English cricketer

Personal information
- Born: 16 August 1860; Maugersbury, Gloucestershire
- Died: 18 May 1948 (aged 87); Denbigh, Wales
- Batting: Right-handed

Domestic team information
- Years: Team
- 1884-1888: Gloucestershire
- Source: Cricinfo, 1 April 2014

Guy Francis (16 August 1860 – 18 May 1948) was an English cricketer. He played for Gloucestershire between 1884 and 1888.
