= A to Z Mysteries =

Book by Ron Roy

- The front cover art for The Absent Author, the first book in the A to Z Mysteries series
- A to Z Mysteries (26 titles); A to Z Mysteries Super Edition (continuing); Calendar Mysteries
- Author: Ron Roy
- Illustrator: John Steven Gurney
- Country: United States
- Genre: Children's, mystery novels
- Publisher: Random House
- Published: September 23, 1997-April 26, 2005 (main series); 2006–present (sequel and spinoff)
- Media type: Print (paperback)

A to Z Mysteries is a series of children's mystery books. The series is written by Ron Roy, illustrated by John Steven Gurney, and published by Random House. The series is generally considered among the best "easy readers" for young children. There are twenty-six books in the original series; one for each letter of the alphabet. The series begins with The Absent Author (1997) and ends with The Zombie Zone (2005).

The books follow the adventures of three child detectives, Donald David "Dink" Duncan, Josh Pinto, and Ruth Rose Hathaway. They are nine years old and live in Green Lawn, a fictional town in Connecticut and they become friends.

Other characters include Pal, a dog who once belonged to criminals and now lives with Josh; Wallis Wallace, a mystery writer and sometime participant; and Mr. Linkletter, the local hotel receptionist. Others include Officer Fallon, Josh's younger twin brothers Bradley and Brian, Ruth Rose's younger brother Nate, a taxi driver Maureen Higgins, two friends Tommy Tomko and Eddie Carini, Officer Fallon's grandson a little kid named Jimmy Fallon, a diner owner named Ellie, Detective Reddy, Ruth Rose's former baby-sitter Olivia (Livvy) Nugent, Livvy's son Randy, Randy's baby sibling, a 30 year old hotel worker Freddy, Wallis Walace's brother Walker Wallace, a kid named Amy Flower, Mrs. Davis, Dink's Guinea Pig Loreta, Dink's mom Mrs. Duncan, Doris Duncan, and Mr. Pasky, owner of the local book nook owner in Green Lawn.

The success of the original series inspired a follow-up series called A to Z Mysteries Super Edition with the same characters. The first book in this series, Detective Camp, was published in May 2006. In addition, Roy and Gurney created a spin-off series titled Calendar Mysteries, beginning with "January Joker" on December 22, 2009.

An article in The Horn Book Magazine states that one reason for the series' popularity may be that the main characters "are about as cool as oatmeal", offering relief to readers who may feel burdened by peer pressure.

== Original series ==
- A to Z Mysteries (26 volumes)

=== The Absent Author ===
The Absent Author
- Author: Ron Roy
- Language: English
- Genre: Children's Mystery
- Publisher: Random House
- Publication date: September 23, 1997
- Publication place: United States
- Media type: Print (Hardback & Paperback)
- Followed by: The Bald Bandit

The Absent Author was written in 1997, and is the first book in the A to Z Mysteries series. In the first installment, the Absent Author, we meet the young team: the well read and thoughtful Dink (that's Donald David Duncan); neighbor Ruth Rose; and best friend Josh. The plot involves three amateur detectives Dink, Josh, and Ruth Rose who come across a mystery when they begin to suspect that a famous mystery writer named Wallis Wallace was kidnapped when he did not show up for a book-signing.

=== The Canary Caper ===
The Canary Caper, the third book in the series, was written in 1998. The plot follows Dink, Josh, and Ruth Rose investigating a series of animal thefts. However, not long after the theft occurs, the animals are returned and all is peaceful. Until the pet owners houses are robbed the very night the pets are returned. This makes the trio look for a connection and eventually leads to a stakeout at a proposed victim's house.

- This book was published on March 3, 1998, along with The Deadly Dungeon.

=== The Deadly Dungeon ===
The Deadly Dungeon, the fourth book in the series, was written in 1998. The trio heads up to Wallis Wallace's castle in Maine where they begin to hear strange noises in the night. While Wallis Wallace says that it is the ghost of a famous movie star who lived there years back, Dink, Josh, and Ruth Rose believe otherwise and are determined to find out the truth. When they find big footprints, Dink and Josh believe it is Wallis' brother, as his feet are about the same size as the footprints. However, Ruth Rose insists it wasn't him, as the trio gets trapped and they know Wallis's brother couldn't do that. At the end, they trap the real culprit.

- This book was published on March 3, 1998, along with The Canary Caper.

=== The Empty Envelope ===
The Empty Envelope, the fifth book in the series, was written in 1998. Donald David "Dink" Duncan gets several letters in the mailbox addressed to "D. Duncan".... but finds when opening them that they all start with "Dear Doris" and are not meant for him. While his friends Josh Pinto and Ruth Rose Hathaway think it is someone's idea of a joke, Dink suspects that there is more to it than that. His suspicions are practically confirmed when Doris Duncan herself shows up one day to acquire the letters and demands them immediately. Not knowing that Ruth Rose's little brother Nate took the letters unaware that they were something important, Dink apologizes to Ms. Duncan, who then leaves in an unpleasant mood. Dink and his friends investigate the letters, uncover a code in the wording, and find a valuable stamp concealed in one of the envelopes hidden under a worthless stamp. Then the owner of the valuable stamp comes to get it back.

- This book was published on April 16, 1998.

=== The Falcon's Feathers ===
The Falcon's Feathers, the sixth book in the series, was written in 1998. In the book, Josh discovers a falcons’ nest, he checks on the young birds every day. But when he tries to show Dink and Ruth Rose, the nest is empty! When they found a baby falcon's wing trimmed, they know that someone is stealing the falcons from Green Lawn. Now they have to find them before it is to late.

- This book was published on October 13, 1998.

=== The Goose's Gold ===
The Goose's Gold is the seventh book in the series. In the book, Dink, Josh, and Ruth Rose are visiting the Florida Keys. Two divers have found sunken treasure, and are taking donations to fund a dive to recover it. They promise to share the wealth with the community, but it all seems too good to be true.

=== The Haunted Hotel ===
The Haunted Hotel is the eighth book in the series. In the book, strange sounds and stranger sights are scaring guests away from the Shangri-la Hotel and out of Green Lawn. It's up to Dink, Josh, and Ruth Rose to stop the spook before their towns turn to a ghost town.

=== The Invisible Island ===
The Invisible Island is the ninth book in the series. In the book, Dink, Josh, and Ruth Rose go to Squall Island. The discovery of a hundred dollar bill in the sand prompts them to return the following day, but when they go back, the island is gone.

=== List of Books in the series ===
- The Absent Author
- The Bald Bandit
- The Canary Caper
- The Deadly Dungeon
- The Empty Envelope
- The Falcon's Feathers
- The Goose's Gold
- The Haunted Hotel
- The Invisible Island
- The Jaguar's Jewel
- The Kidnapped King
- The Lucky Lottery
- The Missing Mummy
- The Ninth Nugget
- The Orange Outlaw
- The Panda Puzzle
- The Quicksand Question
- The Runaway Racehorse
- The School Skeleton
- The Talking T. Rex
- The Unwilling Umpire
- The Vampire's Vacation
- The White Wolf
- The X'ed-Out X-Ray
- The Yellow Yacht
- The Zombie Zone

E-book editions were available by 2010 or earlier; unabridged audiobook editions by 2012 or earlier.

In late 2018, American food chain Popeyes Louisiana Kitchen released the series in smaller sizes with re-illustrated covers in their kids meals.

== A to Z Mysteries Super Edition ==
The sequel series, A to Z Mysteries Super Edition, is set one year after the original series and in different places rather than at home in Connecticut. The books are about fifty pages longer than the original volumes.

- Detective Camp (May 9, 2006)
- Mayflower Treasure Hunt (August 28, 2007)
- White House White-out (August 12, 2008)
- Sleepy Hollow Sleepover (July 27, 2010)
- The New Year Dragon Dilemma (November 22, 2011)
- The Castle Crime (January 28, 2014)
- Operation Orca (June 28, 2015)
- Secret Admirer (December 22, 2015)
- April Fools' Fiasco (February 28, 2017)
- Colossal Fossil (February 27, 2018)
- Grand Canyon Grab (March 5, 2019)
- Space Shuttle Scam (March 3, 2020)
- Crime in the Crypt (July 6, 2021)
- Leopard on the Loose (March 15, 2022)

== Calendar Mysteries ==
The A to Z Mysteries have also led to a spinoff series called Calendar Mysteries, starting with January Joker. The series is aimed at second and third graders and focuses on Dink's cousin Lucy, Josh's younger twin brothers Brian and Bradley, and Ruth Rose's younger brother Nate. The main characters from A to Z Mysteries also make occasional appearances. While A to Z Mysteries focused on alliterating the alphabet to book titles, Calendar Mysteries relates the titles and themes to the different months of the year. The time and settings of each book often correspond to various holidays in a given month.

- January Joker (December 22, 2009)
- February Friend (December 22, 2009)
- March Mischief (January 26, 2010)
- April Adventure (February 9, 2010)
- May Magic (March 22, 2011)
- June Jam (March 22, 2011)
- July Jitters (June 26, 2012)
- August Acrobat (June 26, 2012)
- September Sneakers (August 6, 2013)
- October Ogre (August 6, 2013)
- November Night (August 26, 2014)
- December Dog (September 23, 2014)
- New Year's Eve Thieves (September 23, 2014)

== A to Z Animal Mysteries ==
In 2023, the latest spin-off called A to Z Animal Mysteries focuses on detectives Abigail "Abbi" Wallace, her best friends Lydia and Daniel Herrera, and her dog, Barkley as they solve animal mysteries. The series is written by Kayla Whaley and illustrated by Chloe Burgett.

- The Absent Alpacas (July 4, 2023)
- Bats in the Castle (September 19, 2023)
- Cougar Clues (March 26, 2024)
- Dolphin Detectives (July 30, 2024)
- The Emerald Egg (March 4, 2025)
- Find That Ferret! (November 18, 2025)
- The Gecko Escape Room (July 14, 2026)
