= The Miraculous Journey of Edward Tulane =

2006 novel by Kate DiCamillo

- First edition
- Author: Kate DiCamillo
- Illustrator: Bagram Ibatoulline
- Language: English
- Genre: Young adult novel
- Publisher: Candlewick Press
- Publication date: March 30, 2006
- Publication place: United States
- Media type: Print (Hardback & Paperback)
- Pages: 210
- ISBN: 0-7636-2589-2
- LC Class: PZ7.D5455 Be 2000

The Miraculous Journey of Edward Tulane is a 2006 children's novel by American author Kate DiCamillo and illustrated by Bagram Ibatoulline. Following the life of a china rabbit, the book won the 2006 Boston Globe-Horn Book Award in the Fiction category. Scholarly readings of this novel have examined the work from the lens of spirituality and Christian religious studies, human development, and clinical psychology.

== Plot ==
Edward Tulane is a china rabbit given to a ten-year-old girl named Abilene by her grandmother in the 1930s. He enjoys a pleasant but vain life with his young mistress, who treats him with love and respect until an unfortunate incident finds him falling overboard while vacationing on the Queen Mary. As Edward falls, he sees Abilene standing on the deck of the ship, holding his gold pocket watch (a token of her love) high in the air and calling his name. It is the last thing he sees as he descends into sea. Edward spends an extended period of time on the ocean floor hoping Abilene will come back for him, until a storm frees him from the seabed and a passing fisherman pulls him from his fishing net. The man, Lawrence, takes him home to his wife, Nellie. They name Edward Susannah and Nellie makes him dresses. Edward is briefly upset by this but is ultimately grateful to no longer be on the ocean floor. Lawrence sometimes puts Edward on his shoulders to show and teach him constellations, so if he's ever lost, he can find his way home. Nellie puts Edward in a highchair in the kitchen and talks to him about her and Lawrence’s son, William, who died when he was young, and Edward learns that he is not the only one who has lost something--or someone--very dear to him.

When Lawrence and Nellie’s daughter, Lolly, comes to visit, Edward is taken to the dump because Lolly believes her parents should not be treating a toy rabbit like a child. Edward realizes that he is upset to be separated from Nellie and Lawrence, which he states is a feeling he has not previously experienced.

After 40 days, Edward is taken from the dump by a dog. This is how Edward comes to spend seven years with a homeless man, Bull, and his dog, Lucy. Edward is renamed Malone. He sits on Bull’s shoulders as they walk or travel in empty rail cars. Edward savors the moments when Bull sings to him and Lucy, and when Bull tells Edward about his children which he wishes to be in contact with. One night, a man wakes Bull and Lucy while they are sleeping in a railcar. He accosts Bull and Lucy, flinging Edward from the moving car in the course of the altercation. Edward once again finds himself upset at being separated from his friends, another piece of his heart broken watching the railcar roll away.

An old woman finds Edward on the side of the road and uses him as a scarecrow. A young boy named Bryce, who is being paid to work in the fields, stares at Edward, wishing to have him as a toy. Edward watches the sky longingly, wishing he could just fly away, returning to Abilene and her house on Egypt Street. Bryce takes Edward down and brings him home. Bryce lives with his four-year-old sister, Sarah Ruth, who is bed-ridden because she is extremely sick. She is delighted with Edward and renames him Jangles. Their alcoholic father comes home periodically and is prone to fits of rage. When Sarah Ruth passes away, Bryce runs away from home, so he does not have to interact with his father anymore. He makes money by tying strings to Edward’s limbs and making him dance on street corners. When Bryce goes to a diner with Edward and discovers he cannot pay, the diner owner smashes Edward’s head on the counter and he loses consciousness.

While he is unconscious, Edward dreams that he is back at Abilene's house on Egypt Street. All of the people he has ever loved are there, including Abilene, Nellie, Lawrence, Bull, Lucy, and Bryce. Edward is looking for Sarah Ruth, and Lawrence takes him outside and points to the 'Sarah Ruth constellation.' Edward then discovers he has a pair of wings on his back, which he had dreamt of having during his time as a scarecrow. Edward begins to fly towards Sarah Ruth, but all of his friends manage to catch him. During this scene, Edward is desperate to return to his friends, and reluctant to go back to a world with no light and no future.

Edward wakes up in the house of a toy maker named Lucius Clarke. He learns that Bryce came to the toy maker with Edward shattered in pieces and had offered to give up Edward if the toy maker would only fix him. The toy maker agreed, and Edward is put on display with other toys in his shop. At first, Edward is distraught. His heart is broken from being parted from Bryce and from the death of Sarah Ruth. Although Bryce comes back once to see Edward, Lucius reminds him of their deal and he leaves the shop. Edward is put on a shelf next to a doll who is 100 years old. She advises Edward that he should remain open to loving others despite the pain and sadness that he has experienced. Edward refuses to listen to her advice, insisting that he would rather jump off the shelf than to deal with another broken heart, but the doll reminds him that some will come. Edward repeats these words long after she's gone, a regular chant turning to something that feels like hope. Edward remains in the shop for a long time. Weeks turn to months, months to seasons, seasons to years. One day, many years later, a little girl comes in who loves Edward and wants to have him as a toy. Her mother looks thoughtfully at Edward, and he realizes that it is Abilene. They are then joyfully reunited, and he becomes the toy of her daughter.

== Analysis ==
Edward Tulane has garnered sustained scholarly and popular attention since its publication in 2006. It has been compared to other works of children’s literature, including 's "The Steadfast Tin Soldier" by Hans Christian Andersen, as well as The Indian in the Cupboard by Lynne Reid Banks, The Velveteen Rabbit by Margery Williams, The Mouse and His Child by Russell Hoban, and The Tale of Despereaux, also written by DiCamillo. Teachers and educators state that The Miraculous Journey of Edward Tulane facilitates rich classroom participation and discussion among students, pointing out the utility of the book for engaging students in a read-aloud setting. Scholarly accounts analyze Edward Tulane from the perspective of spirituality and religion, empathic development, and clinical psychology.

=== Religion and spirituality ===
Scholar Catherine Posey’s 2013 empirical study examined how four children between the ages of ten and eleven responded to Edward Tulane in one-on-one interviews, focusing on how the novel created space for articulating perceptions of the divine. Posey found considerable diversity in the children’s responses: one participant identified Sarah Ruth as a God-figure whose love persisted beyond death, while another connected the stars to a God who both witnesses suffering and punishes those who fail to love. Posey concludes that the novel can expand children’s perceptions of the divine in ways that diverge from their religious traditions.

In 2023, a chapter on Edward Tulane was published in a book celebrating the 100th anniversary of The Velveteen Rabbit. Authors Malik, Graves, and Fraustino contend that Edward Tulane can be read as an allegory for the earlier work. They note that both toy rabbits initially belonged to privileged child owners, were partially constructed from real animal materials, and are structured around the central tension of becoming “real” after figurative rebirths. However, the authors point out that DiCamillo seems to explain Edward’s transformation not with magic, but with a type of redemptive love characteristic of Christianity. The chapter advances an extended biblical reading of the novel that traces Edward’s journey as an Exodus from Abilene’s house on Egypt Street. His submersion in the ocean is interrupted simultaneously as a baptism and as a parallel to the story of Jonah, whose pride leads to his being cast overboard before he is redeemed. Edward’s forty days in the dump echo Christ’s forty days in the desert. When Edward is pinned up on the scarecrow pole, they point out the resemblance to the crucifixion.

=== Empathy ===
Scholar Roni Natov, in her 2018 book The Courage to Imagine: The Child Hero in Children’s Literature, offers an extended critical reading of the novel, situating it alongside The Tale of Despeareaux, also by DiCamillo, to compare how the novels instantiate the concept of empathy in young readers. Natov argues that while the mouse-protagonist in Despereaux represents its hero’s innate capacity for empathy, Edward Tulane dramatizes the process of learning how to take the perspectives of others. This is reflected in the continual renaming of Edward throughout the text, which Natov contends represents his expanding consciousness that occurs as a product of inhabiting new forms of human experience. Moreover, she compares Edward’s social descent—from the toy of a privileged child, to garbage heaps and campfires with people who are homeless—to the classical hero’s descent into the underworld. Ultimately, Natov reads Edward’s journey as one of burgeoning empathy, a prerequisite for love.

=== Posthumanism and significance to children's toy novels ===
Academic Shubhneet Kaur Kharbanda contributed an influential scholarly chapter to the book Children’s Cultures After Childhood entitled “Messy Assemblages.” Kharbanda situates Edward Tulane alongside The Velveteen Rabbit and The Indian in the Cupboard within a posthumanist framework. Drawing on Jane Bennett’s concept of “vital materialism” and Bruno Latour’s Actor-Network Theory, Kharbanda argues that the toy figures in these novels challenge the anthropocentric assumption that agency belongs exclusively to human subjects. Edward’s ambiguous ontological status—being simultaneously an inert china toy and a being with complex interiority—exemplifies Bennett’s notion of “thing power,” while his repeated near-destructions and survivals are theorized as evidence of a posthuman capacity for cyclical existence exceeding the human lifespan. Against the idea that toys are transitional objects children inevitably discard, Kharbanda proposes that objects have their own generational arcs, with children appearing only temporarily in the longer biography of a toy.

=== Significance to therapeutic practice ===
Offering a different perspective, psychological clinician James Montgomery wrote an article about the significance of Edward Tulane to narcissistic personality traits. Montgomery reads Edward's fall from the ship as a figure for the narcissist's characteristic helplessness before reality, and traces the subsequent journey through various owners as a parallel to the therapeutic process, moving from helplessness and misrecognition toward the gradual emergence of a safer, more connected self. The shattering of Edward's head and its repair by the doll mender are identified as the central therapeutic metaphor representing the necessary destruction of the narcissist's worldview, while the antique doll's offer of unconditional positive regard is read as the equivalent of the role of the therapist. Montgomery reports using the book directly in clinical practice across patient populations of varying educational and professional backgrounds, and notes that most patients re-read it before returning their copy.

== Reception ==
The Miraculous Journey won the 2006 Boston Globe–Horn Book Award for children's fiction and a Parents' Choice Award for Spring 2006 fiction. It was a Quill Awards finalist in the children's chapter book category.

In 2007 the U.S. National Education Association named it one of "Teachers' Top 100 Books for Children" based on an online poll. In 2012 it was ranked number 59 among all-time children's novels in a survey published by School Library Journal – the third of three books by DiCamillo in the Top 100.

== Adaptations ==
=== Film ===
On October 30, 2013, Robert Zemeckis was set to direct and produce the film adaptation of The Miraculous Journey of Edward Tulane for New Line Cinema with Jeff Stockwell writing the script.

=== Play ===
The novel has been adapted for the stage on multiple occasions. Synchronicity Theatre in Atlanta staged a play by Dwayne Hartford based on the novel in February 2018, and again in September 2023. In 2024, Hartford put on Edward Tulane for an Arizona-based youth theater company called Childsplay. Writing in the Arizona Republic in 2024, critic Kerry Lengel named it the best world premiere of the season, describing Hartford’s adaptation as a tearjerking stunner that used inventive storytelling to create an ever-changing world out of simple set pieces on a revolving stage. The script subsequently attracted significant interest, being taken up by four theaters in a single season, including South Coast Repertory in Southern California and Stages Theater in Minnesota.

=== Opera ===
The Minnesota Opera commissioned Edward Tulane, with Paola Prestini composing the music for the new opera and Mark Campbell writing the libretto. Edward Tulane was scheduled to run at the Ordway Center for Performing Arts in March 2020, but the run was postponed due to the COVID-19 pandemic. It was finally given its world premiere on October 8, 2022. Writing in the Minnesota Star Tribune, critic Rob Hubbard praised the production as one that could engage a multigenerational audience. The production was also noted for its elaborate visual design. The opera was conducted by Lidiya Yankovskaya, and the title role was sung by tenor Jack Swanson. A recording has been released.

=== In popular culture ===
The book was featured in My Love from the Star, a 2014 Korean drama about an alien living on Earth for 400 years who falls in love with a popular actress. This propelled the novel to the top of the bestseller lists in major Korean bookstores as the alien repeatedly quotes from it throughout the series.

The book was also quoted at a memorial service for Lil Peep by his mother.
