= The Tiger Rising =

2001 children's book by Kate DiCamillo

- First edition
- Author: Kate DiCamillo
- Language: English
- Subject: Tiger, animals, wood carving
- Genre: Children's fiction
- Published: Candlewick Press
- Publication place: United States
- Media type: Book, Kindle
- Pages: 114
- Awards: National Book Award Finalist
- ISBN: 0763618985
- OCLC: 43115159

The Tiger Rising is a 2001 children's novel written by American author Kate DiCamillo. It is about a 12-year-old named Rob Horton who finds a caged tiger in the center of the woods near his home. The book was a National Book Award Finalist.

== Plot ==
Rob Horton is 12 years old and suffers from a strange, itchy rash on his legs that he knows isn't contagious. He lives with his father in a Florida motel called the Kentucky Star. His father (named Robert), and Rob have recently moved to Lister, Florida, after the death of Rob's mother, Caroline, to cancer six months prior. Rob is quiet and often is bullied at school. Things begin to change when Rob discovers a caged tiger in the forest while wandering the woods. He then meets a girl named Sistine Bailey who has recently moved nearby. Rob shows Sistine the tiger. Rob, who usually keeps his feelings locked away in an imaginary suitcase begins to open up emotionally to Sistine. Though Sistine insists on letting the tiger go, Rob is wary of what will happen to it if he does. Rob finally relents and releases the tiger, letting it run into the woods. However, just moments later, Rob's father shoots the tiger dead. Rob's father is then seen holding the gun over the tiger in front of the Kentucky Star. Rob then angrily attacks his father and tells him he wishes his father died instead, and also forces him to say the name Caroline Horton, which Rob is forbidden to say. Rob also insists they bury the tiger, and have a funeral. Rob and his father confront their unresolved feelings about Rob's mother and Rob begins looking forward to going to school with Sistine.

== Characters ==
Rob Horton – The protagonist of the story. Rob and his father, Robert Horton, moved from Jacksonville to Lister after his mother's (Caroline Horton) death. He stays at the Kentucky Star Motel along with his father who works there. He is a silent kid and usually gets bullied. He also discovers the tiger in the cage.

Sistine Bailey – Sistine (or Sissy) and her mother move to Lister. Sistine is Rob's classmate. Sistine's parents are divorced after her father had an affair with his secretary. As compared to Rob, she is very open emotionally and gets judged by other people at school.

Willie May – Housekeeper of the Kentucky Star. Though uneducated, she gives old people advice to Rob and Sistine, leading Sistine to claim she is a prophetess. She and Rob both have a connection to losing a loved one.

Robert Horton – Rob's dad. He works at the Kentucky Star Motel and is underpaid by Beauchamp.

Caroline Horton – Rob's mom. She died of lung cancer before Rob and his dad moved to Lister, Florida.

Beauchamp – Owner of the Kentucky Star motel, the woods behind the motel, and the tiger.

The Tiger – The tiger is described as a beautiful and poor animal trapped cruelly in a cage where he cannot leave. He paces around in the cage and is fed by Beauchamp and then Rob. After Rob and Sistine let the tiger out of its cage, it was shot by Rob's dad, killing it.

Cricket – Willie May's childhood pet parakeet that she lets go and eventually is thought to be killed by a snake.

Norton and Billy Threemonger – Two "redneck" brothers who bully Rob in school and on the bus.

Mrs. Bailey – Sistine's mom. She babies Sistine and forces her to wear dresses. Her husband cheated on her with his secretary.

Mr. Phelmer – Principal of Rob's school who views Rob as a nuisance, neglects him, and feels uncomfortable talking to him. He later tells Rob that he cannot come to school in case the strange rash on his legs is contagious.

Preceded by Because of Winn-Dixie	Books by Kate DiCamillo; 2001	Succeeded by The Tale of Despereaux
