= Kate DiCamillo =

American author (born 1964)

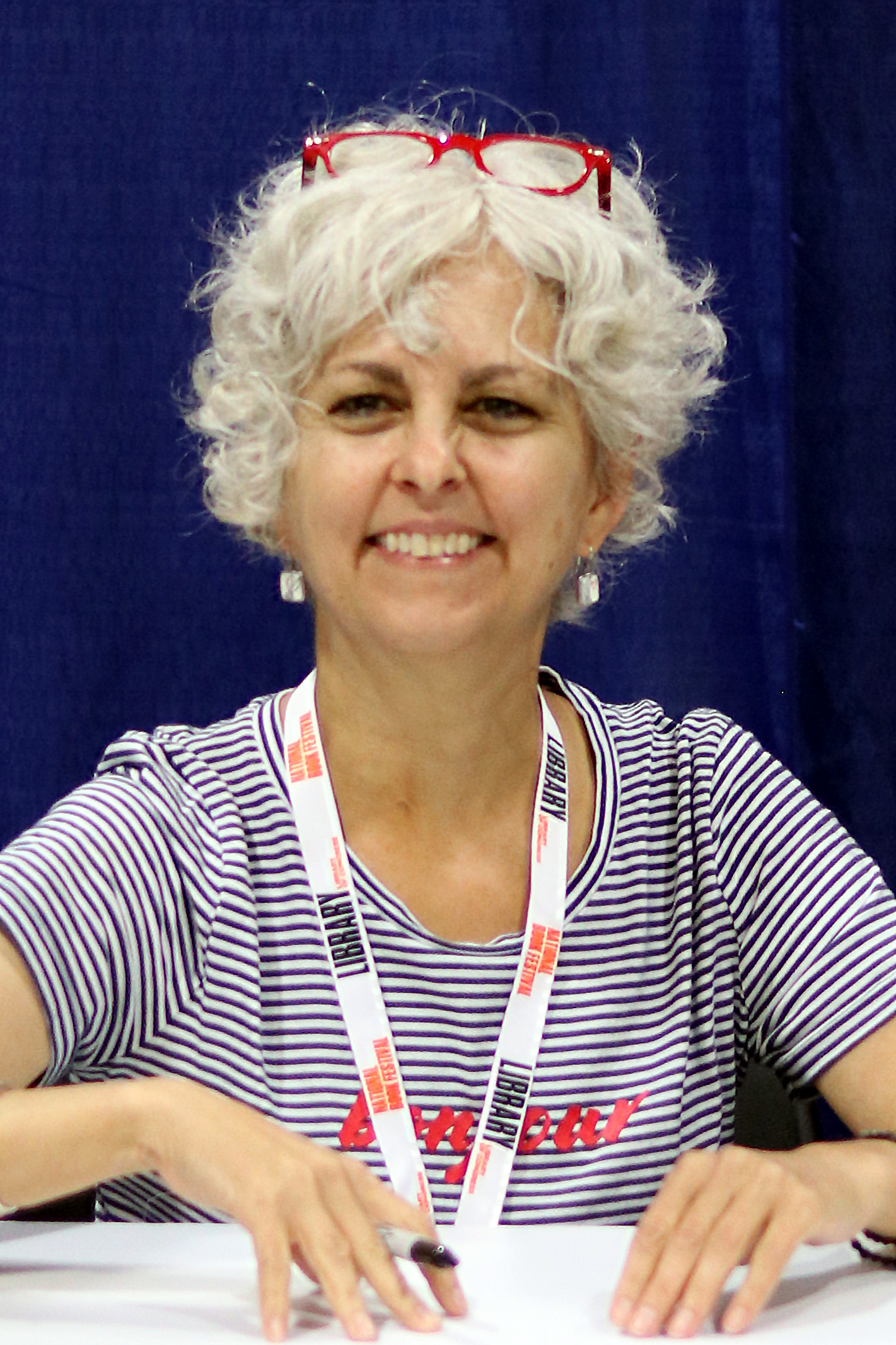
- DiCamillo at the 2018 National Book Festival
- Born: Katrina Elizabeth DiCamillo; March 25, 1964 (age 62); Philadelphia, Pennsylvania, U.S.
- Occupation: Writer
- Writing career
- Genre: Children's fiction
- Notable works: Because of Winn-Dixie (2000); The Tiger Rising (2001); The Tale of Despereaux (2003); The Miraculous Journey of Edward Tulane (2006); The Magician's Elephant (2009); Flora & Ulysses (2013); Mercy Watson series (2005—2022)
- Notable awards: Newbery Medal; 2004, 2014; National Ambassador for Young People's Literature; 2014–15
- Website: katedicamillo.com

Signature
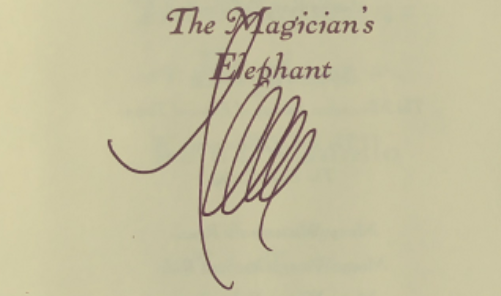

Katrina Elizabeth DiCamillo (born March 25, 1964) is an American author of children's fiction. She has published over 25 novels, including Because of Winn-Dixie (2000), The Tiger Rising (2001), The Tale of Despereaux (2003), The Miraculous Journey of Edward Tulane (2006), The Magician's Elephant (2009), the Mercy Watson series (2005–2022), and Flora & Ulysses (2013). Her books have sold around 37 million copies. Four have been developed into films and two have been adapted into musical settings. The Tale of Despereaux and Flora & Ulysses won the Newbery Medal, making DiCamillo one of seven authors to have won two Newbery Medals.

Born in Philadelphia, DiCamillo moved to Clermont, Florida, as a child, where she grew up. She earned an English degree from the University of Florida, Gainesville, and spent several years working entry-level jobs in Clermont before moving to Minneapolis, Minnesota, in 1994. In Minnesota, DiCamillo worked in a book warehouse and attempted to get a book published. Her first book to be accepted for publication was Because of Winn-Dixie, which was critically and commercially successful. DiCamillo then left her job to become a full-time author.

From 2014 to 2015, DiCamillo was the American National Ambassador for Young People's Literature. She lives in Minneapolis and continues to write. Her newest book, Orris and Timble: Star Stories (the final book in the Orris and Timble early-reader trilogy), was published on April 7, 2026. Her next book, Love & Mercy, is to be published on December 8, 2026.

== Early life and education ==
Katrina Elizabeth DiCamillo was born on March 25, 1964, in Philadelphia, Pennsylvania, to Betty Lee DiCamillo (née Gouff), a teacher, and Adolph Louis DiCamillo, an orthodontist. DiCamillo is the sister of Curt DiCamillo, an architectural historian. She had chronic pneumonia as a child and was often hospitalized. In hopes of helping her sickness, the family moved to the warmer climate of Clermont, Florida, when Kate was five. Her father remained in Philadelphia with his business, but visited on occasion. Although he originally planned to move with the family after selling his practice, this never happened. In a 2023 profile in The New Yorker by Casey Cep, DiCamillo talked about the physical and emotional abuse her father inflicted on the family before their move to Florida.

DiCamillo enjoyed reading as a child and often visited the local library. She has said her mother sparked her love for books. DiCamillo also often turned to reading when she was particularly sick with pneumonia and unable to do much else. She wanted to be a veterinarian until she was around ten.

Over time, DiCamillo learned that she also had very serious allergies that were making her ill. Through careful management, her mother helped her overcome those symptoms too, allowing her to become more active.

DiCamillo was educated at public schools in the area beginning with Clermont Elementary, before entering Rollins College. She left Rollins and worked for a time at Walt Disney World before briefly attending the University of Central Florida. She eventually entered the University of Florida, Gainesville, and graduated with a bachelor's degree in English in 1987.

== Early career ==
DiCamillo then worked various entry-level jobs in Clermont, including at Circus World, Walt Disney World, a campground, and a greenhouse. She said of her life during this time that she thought she was a talented writer and expected it to be quickly recognized so she "sat around for the next seven or eight years". DiCamillo moved to Minneapolis in 1994, following a close friend, and after several jobs was hired to work at The Bookman, a book warehouse and distributor, as a picker, eventually in the children's book section, a placement she was initially disappointed by. While working in the department, DiCamillo discovered The Watsons Go to Birmingham – 1963, a children's novel she greatly admired.

She began writing regularly while working at the warehouse, waking up before her shifts on weekdays to write. At the warehouse, she was assigned to pull books on the children's literature floor, so she began reading those books voraciously to improve her craft. After four years in Minnesota, DiCamillo met the author Louise Erdrich, who encouraged her. DiCamillo submitted her books to several publishers. She received in return 473 rejection letters. She was also encouraged by the author Jane Resh Thomas. By the age of 36, despite her efforts, DiCamillo had published only several short stories aimed at adults.

== Writing career and recognition ==
DiCamillo had published 25 books as of 2018. As of 2021, almost 37 million copies of her books were in print. In 2019, Mpls St Paul Magazine called her "Minnesota's most successful writer". In 2006, a Candlewick Press representative called her books a "cornerstone" of the publisher's success. DiCamillo's first book to be accepted for publication was Because of Winn-Dixie, a story about a girl who finds a stray dog and takes it home. A 1998 McKnight Fellowship grant allowed her to focus more on writing. She conceived the book's plot during the winter of her first year living in Minnesota, when she was missing her Florida home and upset about her apartment's no-dog policy. DiCamillo gave her draft to a Candlewick sales agent who was at a Christmas party held by The Bookman. The draft was initially given to an editor who left the company on maternity leave, and it was lost in a pile of other manuscripts. It was rediscovered when the employee's office was cleaned out. DiCamillo was offered a contract. After a rewrite, the book was published in 2000. Flo Davis, the wife of a founder of the Winn-Dixie supermarket chain, sponsored DiCamillo to visit various schools in Florida and widen the book's reach. It was a quick commercial and critical success. Afterward, DiCamillo left her job to focus on writing full-time. In 2004, she told the Chicago Tribune that she forced herself to write two pages every day, which took her on average 30 minutes to an hour. In 2017, she estimated that she spent 12–15 hours a week writing and 35 to 40 reading, mainly adult fiction. She often traveled to talk about her writing. During the COVID-19 pandemic, DiCamillo reported that she wrote every morning for 100 days.

Because of Winn-Dixie's success marked the beginning of DiCamillo's writing career. It won the 2000 Josette Frank Award and a Newbery Honor. Her second book, The Tiger Rising, was published the next year. It was also well received by critics, who noted stylistic differences between it and Because of Winn-Dixie. DiCamillo won the Newbery Medal in 2004 for her third book, The Tale of Despereaux. She wrote it upon the request of the child of one of her friends for a story with "an unlikely hero". DiCamillo said she was shocked by the news of the Newbery. She said her 2006 book The Miraculous Journey of Edward Tulane, which is about a china rabbit, was very easy to write.

The Mercy Watson series, which features a pig as its main character, began with Mercy Watson Goes for a Ride (2006) and ended with Mercy Watson: Something Wonky This Way Comes (2009). DiCamillo's 2010 novel Bink & Gollie, co-written with Alison McGhee and illustrated by Tony Fucile, won the 2011 Theodor Seuss Geisel Medal. Her 2013 novel Flora & Ulysses was partially inspired by an injured squirrel she saw. It won the Newbery Medal in 2014, making her one of six writers to win two Newberys since the award was created in 1920.

In 2014, DiCamillo was named the fourth National Ambassador for Young People's Literature, a post she held from January 2014 to December 2015. Upon taking that role, she used the theme "Stories Connect Us". In the summers of 2015 and 2016, DiCamillo led the Collaborative Summer Library Program's summer reading campaign as the summer reading champion.

Her 2016 book Raymie Nightingale, about three young girls competing in a competition who end as friends, did not feel complete, and two years later DiCamillo wrote a sequel, Louisiana's Way Home. In 2019 she published Beverly, Right Here, completing a trilogy. In The New York Times the author Kimberly Brubaker Bradley wrote that Beverly, Right Here "may be her finest [book] yet". In 2019 she received the Regina Medal in recognition of her writing. DiCamillo's 2019 picture book La La La uses just one word: "la". Minnesota Governor Tim Walz named March 29, 2020, Kate DiCamillo Day. DiCamillo's novel The Beatryce Prophecy was begun in 2009, rediscovered in 2018, and published in 2021. Her next novel, Ferris, was published on March 5, 2024. Her latest book, Lost Evangeline, the final book in The Norendy Tales trilogy, was published on September 30, 2025.

=== Awards ===
DiCamillo has received several awards for her books.

| Award | Year | Work | Result | Ref. |
|---|---|---|---|---|
| Josette Frank Award | 2000 | Because of Winn-Dixie | Won | |
| Newbery Medal | 2000 | Because of Winn-Dixie | Honor | |
| Dorothy Canfield Fisher Children's Book Award | 2002 | Because of Winn-Dixie | Won | |
| National Book Award for Young People's Literature | 2001 | The Tiger Rising | Finalist | |
| Mark Twain Award | 2003 | Because of Winn-Dixie | Won | |
| Newbery Medal | 2004 | The Tale of Despereaux | Won | |
| Dorothy Canfield Fisher Children's Book Award | 2005 | The Tale of Despereaux | Won | |
| Boston Globe–Horn Book Award: Fiction and Poetry | 2006 | The Miraculous Journey of Edward Tulane | Won | |
| Parents' Choice Award | 2006 | The Miraculous Journey of Edward Tulane | Won | |
| Quill Awards | 2006 | The Miraculous Journey of Edward Tulane | Finalist | |
| Geisel Award | 2006 | Mercy Watson Goes for a Ride | Honor | |
| Geisel Award | 2010 | Bink & Gollie | Won | |
| National Book Award for Young People's Literature | 2013 | Flora & Ulysses | Longlist | |
| Newbery Medal | 2014 | Flora & Ulysses | Won | |
| National Book Award for Young People's Literature | 2016 | Raymie Nightingale | Finalist | |
| Regina Medal | 2019 | — | Won | |
| Minnesota Book Award | 2024 | The Puppets of Spelhorst | Nominated | |

== Adaptations ==
DiCamillo's books have been adapted into films and stage productions. Because of Winn-Dixie became a 2005 film of the same name. The Tale of Despereaux was developed into a 2008 animated film. In 2020, Netflix began production on an animated film based on The Magician's Elephant. In 2021, Walt Disney Pictures released the film Flora & Ulysses as a streaming film on Disney+. The film The Tiger Rising was released in 2022.

DiCamillo co-wrote the Winn-Dixie screenplay and did some early consulting on The Tale of Despereaux, but was comparatively less involved. She has said that she enjoyed both adaptations. She has a cameo in Flora & Ulysses.

In 2017, the Minnesota Opera announced that it was going to adapt The Miraculous Journey of Edward Tulane into an opera. The company postponed its scheduled opening due to the COVID-19 pandemic. The opera, Edward Tulane, received its world premiere on October 8, 2022, at the Ordway Center for the Performing Arts in Saint Paul. The music is by Paola Prestini, and the libretto by Mark Campbell. The production was conducted by Lidiya Yankovskaya and the title role sung by tenor Jack Swanson. A recording has been released.

The Magician's Elephant was adapted into a musical that premiered in Stratford-upon-Avon by the Royal Shakespeare Company in 2021. Although the opening was postponed due to COVID-19, the Royal Society Shakespeare Company scheduled a reopening for October 14.

=== Featured films ===
- Because of Winn-Dixie – February 18, 2005
- The Tale of Despereaux – December 19, 2008
- Flora & Ulysses: The Illuminated Adventures – February 19, 2021
- The Tiger Rising – January 21, 2022
- The Magician's Elephant – March 17, 2023

== Analysis ==
DiCamillo's style is often similar to children's literature from the Victorian or Edwardian eras. Homesickness and hope are frequent themes. Many of the books follow someone who is alone and has to survive on their own, undergoing suffering and loneliness, commonly the absence or loss of parents. The author Julie Schumacher said that "a sense of abandonment [...] pervades everything she has written." Other themes in DiCamillo's novels include love, salvation, emotional change, and "senseless cruelty", according to the New York Times. According to the Journal of the American Academy of Child and Adolescent Psychiatry, DiCamillo's works often begin with young protagonists who are "puzzled, wanting, and waiting" but conclude that they must handle matters on their own.

A New York Times article noted that she has written stories in many different genres. She told the National Endowment for the Arts that her books were "the same story, over and over in many ways" with the same themes repeating. DiCamillo has said that she doesn't know how to "develop a character" but she discovers them "and follow[s] their story." DiCamillo's fiction is influenced by her experiences growing up; for instance, many of her realistic fiction novels take place in north and central Florida and include dialogue common to the Southern United States. She told the Orlando Sentinel that she tries to leave room for the reader to read between the lines, saying that she has tried to emulate E. B. White: "He's using the same words we're all using. It must be that stripped-away quality, his heart is resting more on each word, and that's what I'm always trying to do." Her novels often include "distinct scenes that are lightly connected".

According to DiCamillo, The Miraculous Journey of Edward Tulane wrote itself, while many of her other works go through eight to nine drafts. She usually only writes one book at a time, but in 2015 she told The Horn Book Magazine that she "juggled" various works, for instance writing a draft of a more serious book and then switching to a shorter, less serious one. She has said that when writing books for children she tries to be direct and "not to condescend to them". In a 2018 article in Time, DiCamillo wrote that children's books should be "a little bit sad". She told another interviewer that "the kid in me has never gone away" and that when she writes for children rather than adults the main difference is that she is more hopeful. Many of her books have animals as main characters, something DiCamillo has called ironic, because as a child she avoided such books.

In 2020 the author Ann Patchett published an essay in The New York Times describing reading DiCamillo's work as an adult and recommending that others read it too, calling her work as a whole "sui generis, each one extraordinary".

== List of works ==
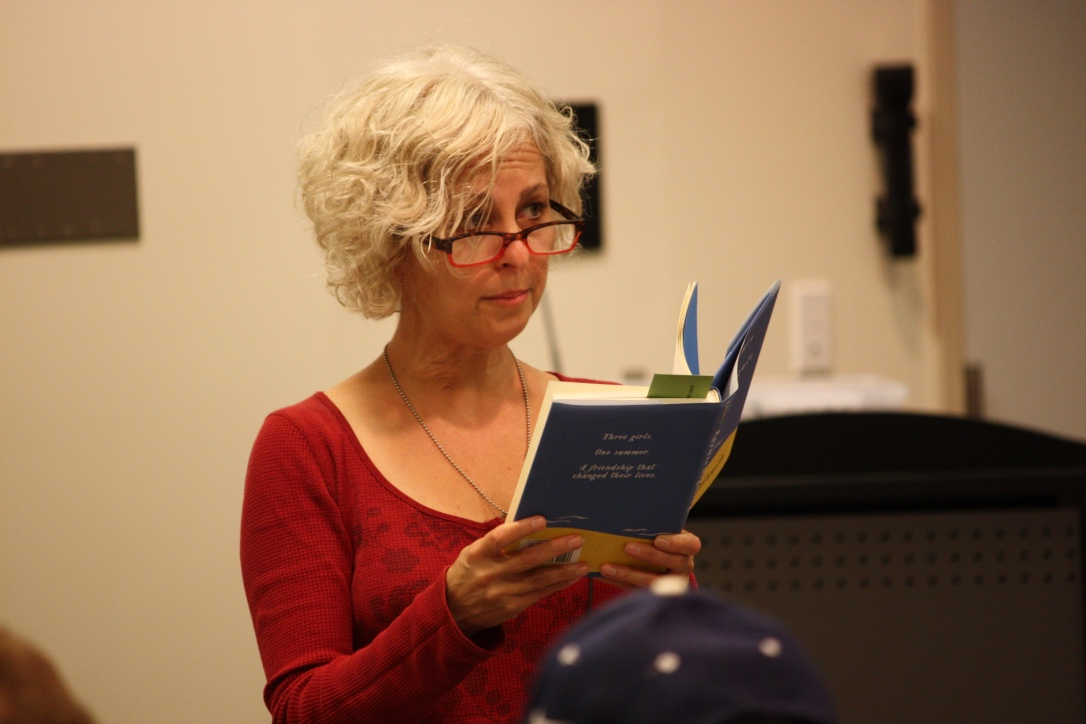
DiCamillo in 2016

=== Novels ===
- Because of Winn-Dixie. Somerville, Massachusetts: Candlewick Press. March 2000. ISBN 978-0-7636-0776-0.
- The Tiger Rising. Somerville, Massachusetts: Candlewick Press. March 2001. ISBN 978-0-7636-1898-8.
- The Tale of Despereaux. Illustrated by Timothy Basil Ering. Somerville, Massachusetts: Candlewick Press. August 2003. ISBN 978-0-7636-1722-6.
- The Miraculous Journey of Edward Tulane. Illustrated by Bagram Ibatoulline. Somerville, Massachusetts: Candlewick Press. February 2006. ISBN 978-0-7636-2589-4.
- The Magician's Elephant. Illustrated by Yoko Tanaka. Somerville, Massachusetts: Candlewick Press. September 2009. ISBN 978-0-7636-4410-9.
- Flora & Ulysses: The Illuminated Adventures. Illustrated by K. G. Campbell. Somerville, Massachusetts: Candlewick Press. September 2013. ISBN 978-0-7636-6040-6.
- Raymie Nightingale. Somerville, Massachusetts: Candlewick Press. April 2016. ISBN 978-0-7636-8117-3.
- Louisiana's Way Home. Somerville, Massachusetts: Candlewick Press. October 2018. ISBN 978-0-7636-9463-0.
- Beverly, Right Here. Somerville, Massachusetts: Candlewick Press. September 2019. ISBN 978-0-7636-9464-7.
- The Beatryce Prophecy. Illustrated by Sophie Blackall. Somerville, Massachusetts: Candlewick Press. September 2021. ISBN 978-1-5362-1361-4.
- The Puppets of Spelhorst. Illustrated by Julie Morstad. Somerville, Massachusetts: Candlewick Press. October 2023. ISBN 978-1-5362-1675-2.
- Ferris. Somerville, Massachusetts: Candlewick Press. March 2024. ISBN 978-1-5362-3105-2.
- The Hotel Balzaar. Illustrated by Julia Sarda. Somerville, Massachusetts: Candlewick Press. October 2024. ISBN 978-1-5362-2331-6.
- Lost Evangeline. Illustrated by Sophie Blackall. Somerville, Massachusetts: Candlewick Press. September 2025. ISBN 978-1-5362-2552-5.
- The True Story of Edith Leapyear, Child Outlaw: As Told by Herself. Somerville, Massachusetts: W.W. Norton & Company. April 2027. ISBN 978-1-3241-5888-2.

=== Early Reader Chapter books ===
- Bink & Gollie series (Candlewick Press), text by DiCamillo and Alison McGhee, illus. Tony Fucile
  - Bink & Gollie (September 2010)
  - Bink & Gollie: Two for One (June 2012)
  - Bink & Gollie: Best Friends Forever (April 2013)
- Mercy Watson series (Candlewick Press), text by DiCamillo, illus. Chris Van Dusen
  - Mercy Watson to the Rescue (August 2005)
  - Mercy Watson Goes for a Ride (May 2006)
  - Mercy Watson Fights Crime (August 2006)
  - Mercy Watson: Princess in Disguise (July 2007)
  - Mercy Watson Thinks Like a Pig (July 2008)
  - Mercy Watson: Something Wonky This Way Comes (July 2009)
  - A Very Mercy Christmas (September 2022)
- Tales from Deckawoo Drive series, text by DiCamillo, illus. Chris Van Dusen
  - Leroy Ninker Saddles Up: Tales from Deckawoo Drive, Volume One (August 2014)
  - Francine Poulet Meets the Ghost Raccoon: Tales from Deckawoo Drive, Volume Two (August 2015)
  - Where Are You Going, Baby Lincoln?: Tales from Deckawoo Drive, Volume Three (August 2016)
  - Eugenia Lincoln and the Unexpected Package: Tales from Deckawoo Drive, Volume Four (October 2017)
  - Stella Endicott and the Anything-Is-Possible Poem, Volume Five (June 2020)
  - Franklin Endicott and the Third Key, Volume Six (June 2021)
  - Mercy Watson is Missing!, Volume Seven (December 2023)
- Orris and Timble series, text by DiCamillo, illus. Carmen Mok
  - Orris and Timble: The Beginning (April 2024)
  - Orris and Timble: Lost and Found (April 2025)
  - Orris and Timble: Star Stories (April 2026)

=== Picture books ===
- Great Joy. Illustrated by Bagram Ibatoulline. October 2007. OCLC 144226866.
- Louise, the Adventures of a Chicken. Illustrated by Harry Bliss. September 2008.
- A Piglet Named Mercy. Illustrated by Chris Van Dusen. April 2019.
- A Very Mercy Christmas. Illustrated by Chris Van Dusen. September 2022.

=== Short stories ===
- "Your Question for Author Here", text by DiCamillo and Jon Scieszka, Guys Read: Funny Business (HarperCollins, 2010)
- "The Third Floor Bedroom", in Chris Van Allsburg, et al., The Chronicles of Harris Burdick: Fourteen Amazing Authors Tell the Tales (Houghton Mifflin Harcourt, 2011)
- "The Castle of Rose Tellin", in The Best Short Stories 2024: The O. Henry Prize Winners (Vintage Books, September 2024)
