= Bink & Gollie =

Children's book

- Author: Kate DiCamillo; Alison McGhee
- Illustrator: Tony Fucile
- Language: English
- Genre: Children's book
- Published: September 14, 2010
- Publisher: Candlewick Press
- Publication place: United States
- Pages: 96
- ISBN: 978-0-7636-3266-3

Bink & Gollie is a children's book written by Kate DiCamillo and Alison McGhee and illustrated by Tony Fucile, and published by Candlewick Press on September 14, 2010. The book contains three stories following the daily lives and adventures of two best friends, a short, untidy yet lovable girl named Bink and a tall, dignified, self-doubting girl named Gollie.

The idea behind the book came in 2006 when DiCamillo and McGhee (who met in 2001) wanted to write one together, which they had not done before. The two had an idea for a story about a short girl and a tall girl, emailing possible names for the characters to each other. They eventually settled on the made-up names "Bink" and "Gollie" (initially spelled "Golly", but changed due to the name reminding McGhee of polliwogs). DiCamillo and McGhee then started coming up with ideas for the stories before writing them, including one involving socks. McGhee called the collaborative process of writing the stories "a great process for [her]", due to it showing her that she could work on literature different from her previous solo works. Tony Fucile based the characters' designs in the illustrations on images and childhood photographs of DiCamillo and McGhee. Prior to its publication, DiCamillo stated that the book "brings [her] joy" and makes her laugh when she reads it.

The book was followed by two more sequels, Bink & Gollie: Two for One on June 12, 2012, and Bink & Gollie: Best Friends Forever on April 23, 2013.

== Reception ==
The magazine Kirkus Reviews compared the titular characters in the book series to James Marshall's George and Martha. The review complimented the cartoonish artwork as "expressive and hilarious", including the "black-and-white scratchy lines and washes" that highlight objects using spot color such as rainbow socks.

== Awards ==
This book received the Theodor Seuss Geisel Medal in 2011.

== Other media ==
Two direct-to-video animated films adapted from the books, Bink & Gollie ...and More Stories About Friendship and Bink & Gollie: Two for One, and Bink & Gollie: Best Friends Forever, were released in 2012 and 2013, respectively. The films were directed by Rory Madge and produced by Paul R. Gagne and Melissa Reilly Ellard at Weston Woods Studios and Chuck Gammage Animation, with music composed by David Mansfield. They featured Kate Micucci as Bink, Riki Lindhome as Gollie, and Jon Carroll, David de Vries and Wendy Carter as additional characters. Bink & Gollie ...and More Stories About Friendship was selected by the Association for Library Service to Children's Carnegie Medal/Notable Children's Videos Committee in 2013, and released on Kanopy in 2018. Bink & Gollie: Two for One won the Carnegie Medal for Excellence in Children's Video in January 2014.

A stage play adaptation was produced by Kindertheater Weber/Camenzind and Theater am Gleis and directed by Andrea Schulthess in 2015–2017, with Christine Camenzind as Bink and Liliane Weber as Gollie. The set design was done by Thomas Freydl.
