= Georgia Shreve =

Georgia Shreve is a composer, writer, playwright, poet, and multimedia artist known for her interdisciplinary approach to the arts. Since the 1990s, she has created more than 100 original compositions, plays, poems, and novels.

== Early life and education ==
Shreve was born in Detroit Michigan, and began exploring the arts at a young age, writing poetry and directing plays by the age of ten. She received a bachelor's degree in philosophy from Stanford University. a master's degree in creative writing from Brown University, a master's degree in finance from Columbia University and a master's degree in psychology from the University of Pennsylvania. She is currently completing a Master of Fine Arts in Creative Writing at Columbia University.

== Career ==
=== Composition ===
Shreve's compositions span a range of genres, including orchestral works, chamber music and vocal pieces. Her works have been performed at Carnegie Hall, Lincoln Center and National Sawdust. Two notable oratorios, Lavinia and Anna Komnene, premiered at Alice Tully Hall in 2022 with a 62-piece orchestra. These works explore themes of education and the role of strong women in history.

=== Writing ===
Shreve's literary works have been featured in The New Yorker, The New Republic, and The New Criterion. Her short story "Last Acts" was published in The New Yorker and explores themes of loss and resilience. She is also the author of the poetry collection Messages Never Sent and the recipient of the Stanford Magazine Fiction Award for her story "The Countess of M—".

=== Multimedia art ===
Shreve integrates music, literature, and visual imagery in her multimedia performances. One of her notable projects, Four Seasons, merges time-lapse photography with her piano concerto to evoke the passage of time and the beauty of nature.

=== Discography ===
- Lavinia (Oratorio, 2022)
- Anna Komnene (Oratorio, 2022)
- Spirit of Christmas (album, 2024)
- Lives of a Woman (Recorded with the Czech National Symphony Orchestra, 2024)

== Personal life ==
Shreve was married to portfolio manager Glenn Greenberg, the son of baseball player Hank Greenberg. Together, they had three sons who pursued careers in business, mathematics, and music. Shreve was one of the first female investment bankers, a role she used to support her artistic work. In 2007, Shreve sold her 1060 Fifth Avenue penthouse for $46 million, setting a record for the largest co-op deal in New York City at the time.

== Reception ==
A review in The New Yorker praised her writing for its "complex emotional resonance and deft storytelling".
