= The Tale of Despereaux (video game) =

2008 video game

- North American Microsoft Windows cover art
- Developers: Sensory Sweep Studios; The Fizz Factor (DS)
- Publishers: North America; Atari; Universal Pictures Digital Platforms Group (DS); Europe; Warner Bros. Interactive Entertainment
- Platforms: Nintendo DS; Wii; PlayStation 2; Microsoft Windows
- Release: Nintendo DS, Wii, PlayStation 2 December 2, 2008; Microsoft Windows; December 16, 2008
- Genre: Action
- Mode: Single-player

The Tale of Despereaux is a 2008 action video game based on the 2008 film of the same name, which itself is based on the 2003 novel of the same name. It was first released for Nintendo DS, Wii, and PlayStation 2. Two weeks later, the game was also released on Microsoft Windows.

While the Nintendo DS version of the game received positive reviews, the other versions were mostly rated negatively.

== Gameplay ==
The Tale of Despereaux is an action game with jump 'n' run elements in which players control a mouse named Despereaux through a total of 16 chapters. While the Wii, PlayStation 2 and PC versions of the game feature a real 3D environment, the DS version is a 2.5D sidescroller game in which players have to walk from the left to the right side of the screen. When touching water, the mouse drowns and respawns at the start of the level or, if activated, the last checkpoint. Players can hit enemies with a "sword" (a toothpick or needle) to kill them. If enemies attack the mouse, the player dies and also respawns. Depending on the enemy, it will take a certain number of hits to kill them. In all levels, three notes—a red, a green, and a blue one—can be found.

== Development ==
On August 19, 2008, video game publisher Brash Entertainment announced that a video game based on the film The Tale of Despereaux was in development.

In October 2008, Universal Pictures announced they would publish the Nintendo DS version through Universal Pictures Digital Platforms Group, while Brash would handle distribution.

However, after the game went gold, Brash Entertainment announced they had officially declared closure in November 2008. On December 2, 2008, Atari announced they had picked up publishing rights to the title in North America, although due to the game going gold prior to the announcement and Brash's closure, the packaging would retain Brash Entertainment's logo and branding. The DS version, which Atari now handled distribution, retained Universal branding and publishing. Warner Bros. Interactive Entertainment took over publication and distribution in Europe.

On December 2, 2008, the game was released for Nintendo DS, Wii, and PlayStation 2. On December 16 of the same year, the game was also released on Microsoft Windows. An Xbox 360 version of the game was also planned, but was cancelled for unknown reasons.

== Reception ==
Reception

Review scores
| Publication | Score |
|---|---|
| IGN | 1.9 (PS2, Wii) |
| IGN | 7.7 (DS) |

According to review aggregator website Metacritic, the Nintendo DS version of the game received "Generally Favorable Reviews". IGN rated the PlayStation 2 and Wii versions of the game with 1.9 out of 10 points, calling it "[...] a total disaster [...]", stating that it "[...] offered almost nothing redeeming during the six to seven hours it took to beat it". However, the Nintendo DS version received a positive review with 7.7 of 10 points by IGN, stating that the game is "A charming little platformer that's ideal for younger gamers". Variety magazine praised the DS version's graphics and the game's learning curve.
