= Paola Prestini =

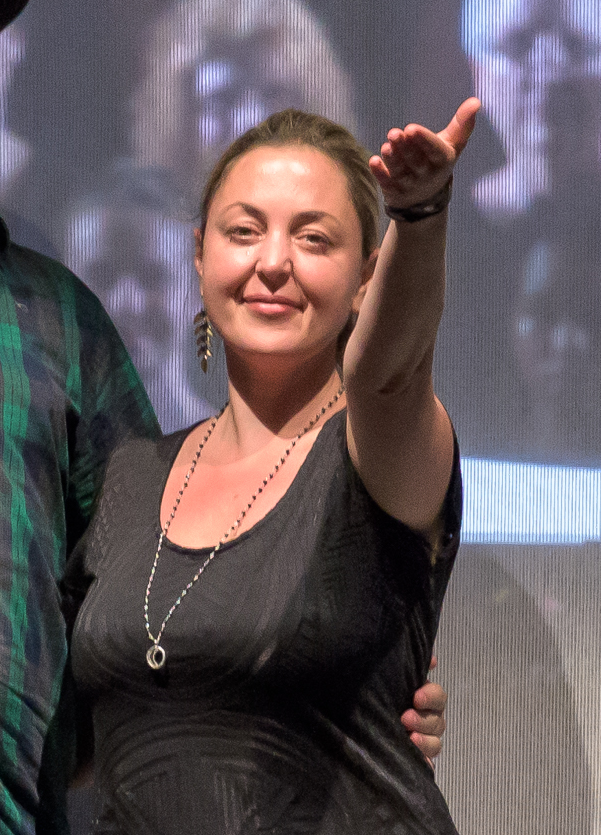
- Prestini pictured in 2016

Background information
- Born: 1975; Italy
- Genres: Classical music, other
- Occupations: Composer, musician
- Spouse: Jeffrey Zeigler
- Website: www.paolaprestini.com

Paola Prestini (born 1975) is a composer of classical music. The New York Times referred to Prestini as "the enterprising composer and impresario" and a "human resources alchemist". In 2011, she was named one of the Top 100 Composers in the World under 40 by National Public Radio.

== Early life and education ==
Prestini was born in Italy and graduated from the Interlochen Arts Academy and Juilliard School, where she "had already developed a reputation as a formidable impresario even before she graduated." She studied there under Samuel Adler, Robert Beaser, and Sir Peter Maxwell Davies. She was also a PD Soros Fellow. Most recently, in 2016, she was named by Musical America, one of 30 “Innovators” of the year.

== Career ==
In 1999, while still a student, Prestini co-founded VisionIntoArt, an interdisciplinary arts company that established the annual 21c Liederabend festival, which went on to be performed at Disney Hall with the Los Angeles Philharmonic, and at BAM's 2013 Next Wave Festival (in collaboration with Beth Morrison Projects), the Colorado Project (for which the New York Times called her music "downright gorgeous") premiered at Houston's Da Camera Series, The Met Museum, Stanford University and the Kennedy Center, and a variety of other multimedia collaborations. Her Hubble Cantata was performed in the largest to date communal VR experience at Bric's Celebrate Brooklyn; the New Yorker said of the event "six thousand of us together, in Prospect Park, Brooklyn, [were] floating around the Orion Nebula...Crescendos, beauty, drama…It astounded me, this feeling of floating above Earth, and tears began to emerge from my cardboard goggles..." while Hyperallergic called it "a thundering opus”. Nature Magazine called it "a highly collaborative meld of science and art."

She is also the founding artistic director and CEO of National Sawdust. Her programming endeavors there have "earned her large stores of gratitude in the new-music world". She has been quoted by Timeout NY as "Paola Prestini is a name to know in New York new music, as she works to secure a home for innovative composition and performance in Williamsburg".

She sits on the strategy committee for Prototype Festival, is a regular curator at John Zorn's The Stone, and also sits on the board of National Sawdust. Some of the compositions she has written or is working on include Gilgamesh, Labyrinth, The Hubble Cantata, Aging Magician, Epiphany, The Colorado, Oceanic Verses, Two Oars, and Mass Re-Imaginings. Prestini's music has been commissioned by and performed at the following institutes: Carnegie Hall, Chicago Symphony, the New York Philharmonic, New York City Opera and the Kronos Quartet, and in non-U.S. venues. Recordings of her music have been released on VIA Records, Innova, and Tzadik Records, and her compositions have been published in the Arcana series by Hips Road. She is the editor of the New York Philharmonic's Very Young Composer handbook.

Of her recent works which focus on the voice, Aging Magician represents her penchant for long process, interdisciplinary work that she self initiates and co-produces. Of Aging Magician, Anthony Tommasini of the New York Times stated that "[Prestini’s] choral writing is ethereal, unfolding in long-spun lines and chantlike phrases. Yet there are complex stretches of cluster chords that the choristers sing with precision." The Boston Globe called her opera Gilgamesh "an enchanted exploration of the eternal mysteries….[Prestini's] atmospheric but tuneful music for 'Gilgamesh' inhabited an indie-opera rainforest of its own…" and The Boston Music Intelligencer said of it "It sparkles, both literally and figuratively…Her melodies entice and speak of a modern, yet accessible flare…it holds its intensity with valor through its end." Upcoming large scale work include a new installment of the River Project with filmmaker Murat Eyuboglu (filmmaker of the Colorado) based on the Amazon, which currently won a 2017 NEA award, and Two Oars, a new opera with Robert Wilson, and the cellist Jeffrey Zeigler.

Her two-act opera Edward Tulane received its world premiere on October 8, 2022, by the Minnesota Opera at the Ordway Center for the Performing Arts in Saint Paul. The libretto by Mark Campbell is based on the 2006 novel The Miraculous Journey of Edward Tulane by Kate DiCamillo about a toy rabbit who has been separated from his family. The production was conducted by Lidiya Yankovskaya, and the title role was sung by tenor Jack Swanson. A recording has been released.

== Recognition and awards ==
The New York Times referred to Prestini as "the enterprising composer and impresario" and a "human resources alchemist". In 2011, she was named one of the Top 100 Composers in the World under 40 by National Public Radio. In 2001 Prestini was one of eight of America's “most promising composers in the early stages of their professional careers [to be] selected out of nearly 200 submissions received from around the country." Excerpts from The Hubble Cantata were praised as "the high point of the evening visually as well as musically” at Liederabend, Opus L.A. in April 2016.

Prestini received the Victor Herbert Award ASCAP in 2014 and the ASCAP Morton Gould Young Composer Award for double string quartet and double bass (in 2002). She has also been the recipient of the NEFA grant Award Grants for Aging Magician, in the category ranging from $90,000-$130,000. She was a NYSCA Individual Artist Grant Awardee in both 2006 and 2009.

In 2009, Prestini received first prize for her work Nightsong: For Solo Marimba in the Marimba/Cello Duo Category Classical Marimba League Composition, the Lower Manhattan Cultural Council Grant Award. She also received an American Music Center CAP Grant in 2004, 2007, 2008 and 2010; the Mary Flagler Cary Charitable Trust for New Music Grant in 2008; the Trust for Mutual Understanding Grant in 2008; the Lower Manhattan Cultural Council Grant/Swing Space Award in 2006; and the Monumental Brass Quintet Women's Commissioning Award in 2003. She also received the Paul and Daisy Soros Fellowship for New Americans and other fellowships from Carnegie Hall and the Sundance Institute, among others.

Prestini has held residencies at Florida's Hermitage Artist Retreat, LMCC Governor’s Island, MASS MoCA, The Park Avenue Armory, The Watermill Center and Wyoming's Ucross Foundation.

== Personal life ==
Prestini lives in Brooklyn, with her husband cellist Jeffrey Zeigler and her son Tommaso.
