= Flora & Ulysses (film) =

2021 family comedy film directed by Lena Khan

- Disney+ release poster
- Directed by: Lena Khan
- Screenplay by: Brad Copeland
- Based on: Flora & Ulysses by Kate DiCamillo
- Produced by: Gil Netter
- Starring: Matilda Lawler; Alyson Hannigan; Ben Schwartz; Anna Deavere Smith; Danny Pudi; Benjamin Evan Ainsworth; Janeane Garofalo; Kate Micucci
- Cinematography: Andrew Dunn
- Edited by: Jamie Gross
- Music by: Jake Monaco
- Production companies: Walt Disney Pictures; Netter Productions
- Distributed by: Disney+
- Release date: February 19, 2021
- Running time: 95 minutes
- Country: United States
- Language: English

Flora & Ulysses is a 2021 American superhero comedy-drama film directed by Lena Khan from a screenplay by Brad Copeland. It is based on the children's novel of the same name by Kate DiCamillo. The film stars Matilda Lawler, Alyson Hannigan, Ben Schwartz, Anna Deavere Smith, Danny Pudi, Benjamin Evan Ainsworth, Janeane Garofalo, and Kate Micucci while John Kassir provides the vocal effects of Ulysses.

Flora & Ulysses was released on Disney+ on February 19, 2021. It received generally positive reviews from critics. The film was removed from Disney+ on May 26, 2023, but later re-released digitally on September 26, 2023.

== Plot ==
Set in the 21st century in a suburban town in Vancouver, Flora Belle Buckman is a cynical 10-year-old girl who likes to get lost in the world of superheroes from the comics she reads. Her father George is a failed comic book author who has since taken a job at an office supply store called Binders Keepers overseen by his boss Chad while her mother Phyllis is a romance novelist who had won an award in the past, but has since hit writer's block. Their hardships have caused them to separate.

Flora's next door neighbor Tootie experiences trouble with her Ulysses brand vacuum that begins running amok in her yard. A regular squirrel is sucked into it just as the machine dies. Flora resuscitates the squirrel and takes to naming him after the vacuum. The next day, Ulysses uses Phyllis' vintage typewriter to type "Squirtel. [sic] I am. Ulysses. Born anew". Flora quickly discovers that Ulysses is not only sentient, but seems to possess superpowers as well. She regales her findings to Tootie's visiting nephew William Spiver who suffers from "hysterical blindness" due to stress.

When George arrives to see Flora, he and Phyllis discover Ulysses and he agrees to drop him off while he takes Flora out for the day. They stop by the diner Do-Nut World first, but Rita the waitress discovers Ulysses who begins to make a mess in the diner. George sees firsthand that Ulysses has superhuman flight and strength. Father and daughter grab him and flee back to his apartment which is monitored by a feisty cat named Mr. Klaus. The owner of the apartment is also named Mr. Klaus. They see his neighbor Dr. Meescham who tells them that Ulysses is fine and also witnesses his intelligence.

Meanwhile, the diner brings in Miller, an animal control expert who has a vendetta against squirrels due to having been demoted from his park warden duty following a rabid squirrel attack. A hysterical Rita believes that Ulysses had rabies and Miller becomes more determined to catch him.

When Flora and William visit Stanlee at his comic book store, they learn on the news that Ulysses is a fugitive and race to see George, who has decided to quit his job which also led to the regional manager to fire Chad. They hide at George's apartment, but Miller deduces their location. He gets attacked by Mr. Klaus, allowing the heroes to escape, but Miller gives chase. They evade him and make it back home.

Phyllis reveals that she is stressed out about an interview tomorrow for a newspaper and George agrees to be there beside her for support, hinting to Flora that he does not want to divorce her. In return, Phyllis reluctantly allows Ulysses to stay in their house. The interview goes poorly when the journalist sees Ulysses' writings and believes that Phyllis is in a dead end.

The next day, Miller sees the printed article and discovers George's family. Phyllis takes Ulysses to the woods to get rid of him, but realizes that she cannot go through with it after Ulysses gives her encouragement.

Flora and William head to the woods to rescue Ulysses and hide at an abandoned water park to escape a rainstorm. William reveals that he was sent away because he pushed his stepfather's car into a lake. He loved his biological father for his intellect and misses him. George meets up with Phyllis and Ulysses and find Flora and William where Phyllis apologizes. However, Miller arrives with a team and they capture Ulysses informing the family that they will euthanize him as they still believe he has rabies.

The Buckmans and William team up with Dr. Meescham and sneak into the animal sanctuary. While there, William overcomes his stress and regains his sight. They release all the animals, including a very angry Mr. Klaus, to distract Miller and his team and free Ulysses who once again displays his powers to rescue George. They decide to release Ulysses back into the wild. Miller arrives, but is frightened away by the abundance of squirrels.

The Buckmans work together to create a comic book called Ulysses, based on their adventure.

== Cast ==
- Matilda Lawler as Flora Buckman, a young cynical 10-year-old girl who enjoys superhero comic books.
  - Emma Oliver as six-year-old Flora
- John Kassir as the vocal effects of Ulysses, a squirrel that receives superpowers.
- Alyson Hannigan as Phyllis Buckman, a romance novelist and the mother of Flora.
- Ben Schwartz as George Buckman, a struggling comic book writer and the father of Flora who works at an office supply store.
- Benjamin Evan Ainsworth as William Spiver, a boy whom Flora befriends and is "hysterically blind".
- Nancy Robertson as Tootie Tickham, the neighbor of Flora and the aunt of William.
- Danny Pudi as Miller, an animal control officer who previously lost his job of park warden due to a rabid squirrel attack.
- Kate Micucci as Rita, a waitress at Do-Nut World and Miller's love interest.
- Darien Martin as Incandesto / Alfred T. Slipper, a superhero that was conceived by George.
- Bobby Moynihan as Stanlee, the owner of a comic book store who Flora visits; he was named after late Marvel comic book writer Stan Lee.
- Anna Deavere Smith as Dr. Meescham, the Buckmans' neighbor.
- Janeane Garofalo as Marissa, the neighbor of George.
- Christine Lee as Journalist
- Jesse Reid as Chad, George's supervisor at Binders Keepers with a jerk personality.
- Javier Lacroix as Donald
- David Milchard as Do-Nut World Cook
- Kyle Straut as Shobo
- Tori Katongo as The Mighty Condor, a superhero that was conceived by George.
- Henry Mah as the unnamed regional manager of Binders Keepers that Chad answers to.

Author of the original book Kate DiCamillo has a cameo in the film as a woman named Kate.

== Production ==
On May 31, 2018, it was announced that Disney was developing a film adaptation of Kate DiCamillo's novel Flora & Ulysses for their streaming service Disney+, with Brad Copeland writing the script.

On June 13, 2019, Alyson Hannigan and Ben Schwartz were cast as Flora's parents. Gil Netter produced the project. On June 27, 2019, Lena Khan was announced as director, and Matilda Lawler was cast in the titular role of Flora Buckman with Benjamin Evans Ainsworth and Danny Pudi also added to the cast as filming began in Vancouver. Pudi was cast before Schwartz and when director Lena Khan was deciding the role of the comic book store owner, Schwartz texted Bobby Moynihan who accepted immediately. Kate Micucci had already auditioned for the role of Rita and was cast due to her closeness with the three actors. This resulted in a reunion of the cast of the Disney animated series DuckTales. Filming wrapped on August 23, 2019.

Post-production was done remotely during the COVID-19 pandemic.

== Release ==
Flora & Ulysses was released on February 19, 2021, on Disney+. The movie made its linear premiere on Disney Channel in the United States on March 13, 2023.

The film was removed from Disney+ on May 26, 2023 as part of the Disney+/Hulu content purge. In response to backlash surrounding this, it was re-released digitally on multiple platforms including Amazon Prime Video, Vudu and Google Play on September 26, 2023.

== Reception ==
=== Audience viewership ===
According to Nielsen, Flora and Ulysses was the second-most-streamed film across all platforms in the United States during the week of February 15, 2021, to February 21, 2021.

=== Critical response ===
On review aggregator Rotten Tomatoes, 73% of 62 critics gave the film a positive review, with an average rating of 6.4/10. The website's critics consensus reads "Agreeable if not exceptional, Flora and Ulysses offers a fun, funny, family-friendly diversion -- and a furry twist on the superhero genre." On Metacritic, it has a weighted average score of 62 out of 100 based on 10 critics, the film received "generally favorable" reviews.

Peter Debruge of Variety praised the visual effects and applauded the score of the movie, writing, "Khan deserves credit for translating such slapstick to live action. Boosted by composer Jake Monaco's fantastical score, the entire production feels like a gateway drug for Disney's Marvel franchise." Maya Phillips of The New York Times praised the movie's direction and humor, complimented the performances of the actors, and found the visual effects effective, stating, "Flora & Ulysses veers close to falling into the trap of cheesiness that kids' movies of this genre often find themselves in, but miraculously never does. In fact, this hopeful comedy, in showing how a twitchy-tailed hero can change a family, lifts off and flies." Nell Minow of RogerEbert.com gave the film three and a half out of four stars and stated, "The superhero power of this movie comes from its endearingly offbeat characters, goofy humor, and gentle insights about finding optimism even when things go wrong."

Jennifer Green of Common Sense Media rated the film four out of five stars, complimented the movie for its educational value on creativity and its depiction of purposeful and benevolent superheroes, while praising the positive messages and role models for promoting friendship, perseverance, and independence. Kate Erbland of indieWire gave the film a 'B' and said, "We can't all have a supeheroic squirrel to help find our own purposes in life, but Flora & Ulysses posits that we don't need one - just a willingness to welcome their special kind of magic, in whatever shape it may take." Archika Khurana of The Times of India gave the movie a three out of five stars rating and found the screenplay to be strongly creative, stated that the visual effects manage to be smoothly integrated in the narrative, while complimenting the performances of the cast.

Adam Graham of Detroit News gave the film a 'B−' and stated, "It might not make you believe in the superpowers of squirrels, but for a quirky time-passer, you could do a lot worse." Angie Han of KPCC asserted, "It's one of those family movies that are kind of cute to watch if you have a kid to entertain, but otherwise there's no reason for an adult to watch it."

=== Accolades ===
Year	Award	Category	Nominee(s)	Result	Ref.
2022	Visual Effects Society Awards	Outstanding Animated Character in a Photoreal Feature	Pierre-Loïc Hamon, Sachin Tyagi, Nandini Nambiar, Loïc Mireault	Nominated	
2022	Annie Awards	Outstanding Achievement for Character Animation in a Live Action Production	Thomas Becker, Daniel Cavalcante, Philipp Winterstein, Victor Dinis, Thiago Lima Martins	Nominated	
