= Chris Van Dusen (illustrator) =

American children's book illustrator and author (born 1960)

- Born: March 17, 1960 (age 66); Portland, Maine
- Education: University of Massachusetts Dartmouth
- Occupations: Illustrator, writer
- Writing career
- Genre: Children's literature
- Website: chrisvandusen.com

Chris Van Dusen (born March 17, 1960) is an American illustrator and author of picture books. He has written picture books including If I Built a Car (2005) and The Circus Ship (2009), and has illustrated books including the Mercy Watson series by Kate DiCamillo.

== Early life and education ==
Chris Van Dusen was born in Portland, Maine. As a child he frequently drew pictures with his brothers. He loved the rhythm of Dr. Seuss's books and the visual detail of Robert McCloskey's illustrations, and has said McCloskey's 1952 book One Morning in Maine is his favorite book. Other inspirations include Barbara Cooney and E. B. White.

In 1982, Van Dusen graduated with a bachelor's degree in fine art from the University of Massachusetts Dartmouth. Following his graduation, he worked as a waiter before getting a part-time job in Lowell, Massachusetts, at a magazine for teenagers, where he began to publish his cartoons and illustrations. IN 1985 he moved to Camden, Maine.

== Career ==
=== Cartoons and illustrations ===
Van Dusen worked as a freelance illustrator for 10 years, publishing much of his work in children's magazines such as Nickelodeon, FamilyFun, and Disney Adventures. He created a poster for Ringling Bros. and Barnum & Bailey Circus, and illustrated several L.L.Bean catalog covers. He created the lobster on the Maine state license plate. In about 1991 he created illustrations for the Monterey Bay Aquarium, including a sea otter T-shirt that Taylor Swift wore in 2025, which led to the shirt to being reissued.

=== Children's books ===
In 2000, he published his first picture book, Down to the Sea with Mr. Magee. As of 2025 he is the author-illustrator of 12 books, including If I Built a Car (2005) and The Circus Ship (2009). In 2015, he published his first non-rhyming story, Hattie and Hudson. He has illustrated an additional 18 books by other writers, including the Mercy Watson series by Kate DiCamillo.

Van Dusen says his illustrations are painted in gouache on an illustration board. He enjoys seeing children's reactions to his books, and frequently visits schools around New England. In 2026, Van Dusen's work was displayed at the Maine Maritime Museum in an exhibition called "Upon That Isle in Maine: The Story & Works of Chris Van Dusen".

== Personal life ==
Van Dusen and his wife Lori have two adult sons. The couple lives in coastal town in Maine and have a yellow lab named Opal.
