= Alison McGhee =

American author (born 1960)

- Born: July 8, 1960 (age 66); New York, United States
- Occupations: Novelist, professor
- Writing career
- Period: 1985–present
- Genres: Fiction, young adult, children's picture books
- Notable work: Shadow Baby
- Website: www.alisonmcghee.com

Alison McGhee (born July 8, 1960) is an American author, who has published several picture books, books for children, and adult novels. She is a New York Times bestselling author, and the winner of numerous awards.

== Education ==
McGhee attended Holland Patent High School, in New York and Middlebury College in Vermont.

== Career ==
McGhee's first novel, Rainlight, follows the characters left behind after the sudden and accidental death of Starr Williams. It received positive reviews and won both the Great Lakes College Association National Fiction Award and the Minnesota Book Award in 1999. McGhee's sophomore effort, Shadow Baby, is witnessed through the eyes of a young girl who befriends an old man as part of a school project. It was a Pulitzer Prize nominee. McGhee continued her adult themes with Was It Beautiful?.

She then began writing children's pictures. Countdown to Kindergarten and Mrs. Watson Wants Your Teeth, both share the same main character who begins the first story as she enters kindergarten and is in first grade by the second book. Turning her hand to young adult novels, McGhee introduced Snap and All Rivers Flow to the Sea.

In Only a Witch Can Fly McGhee focuses on poetry. In this story-poem, created in sestina form, a little girl dreams about flying on her broom.

McGhee is also a professor of creative writing at Metropolitan State University in Saint Paul, Minnesota.

== Personal life ==
McGhee is single with three grown children.

== Bibliography ==
=== Novels for adults ===
- 1998 - Rainlight
- 2000 - Shadow Baby
- 2003 - Was It Beautiful?
- 2007 - Falling Boy
- 2018 - Never Coming Back
- 2020 - The Opposite of Fate

=== Young adult and middle-grade novels ===
- 1999 - Snap
- 2018 - What I Leave Behind
- 2024 - Dear Brother

=== Picture books ===
- 2002 - Countdown to Kindergarten - Illustrated by Harry Bliss
- 2004 - Mrs. Watson Wants Your Teeth - Illustrated by Harry Bliss
- 2006 - A Very Brave Witch - Illustrated by Harry Bliss
- 2007 - Someday - Illustrated by Peter H. Reynolds
- 2008 - Bye-bye, Crib - Illustrated by Ross MacDonald
- 2008 - Little Boy - Illustrated by Peter H. Reynolds
- 2009 - Always - Illustrated by Pascal Lemaitre
- 2009 - Song of Middle C - Illustrated by Scott Menchin
- 2009 - Only a Witch Can Fly - Illustrated by Taeeun Yoo
- 2010 - So Many Days - Illustrated by Taeeun Yoo
- 2011 - Making a Friend, illustrated by Marc Rosenthal
- 2013 - The Case of the Missing Donut, illustrated by Isabel Roxas
- 2014 - Star Bright, illustrated by Peter H. Reynolds
- 2015 - The Sweetest Witch Around, illustrated by Harry Bliss
- 2016 - Tell Me a Tattoo Story, illustrated by Eliza Wheeler
- 2017 - Percy, Dog of Destiny, illustrated by Jennifer K. Mann
- 2020 - World So Wide, illustrated by Kate Alizadeh

== Awards ==
- 2011 Theodor Seuss Geisel Award with co-author Kate DiCamillo and illustrator Tony Fucile (Bink and Gollie)
- 1999 Minnesota Book Award (Rainlight)
- 2000 Minnesota Book Award (Shadow Baby)
- 2003 Minnesota Book Award (Countdown to Kindergarten)
- 2008 Minnesota Book Award (All Rivers Flow to the Sea)
- 2017 Christopher Award (Firefly Hollow)
- 2024 Nomination for Minnesota Book Award (Dear Brother)
- 2025 Nomination for Minnesota Book Award (Telephone of the Tree)
- The Great Lakes College Association National Fiction Award
