= Because of Winn-Dixie (film) =

- Theatrical release poster
- Directed by: Wayne Wang
- Screenplay by: Joan Singleton
- Based on: Because of Winn-Dixie by Kate DiCamillo
- Produced by: Trevor Albert; Joan Singleton
- Starring: Jeff Daniels; Cicely Tyson; Dave Matthews; Eva Marie Saint; AnnaSophia Robb
- Cinematography: Karl Walter Lindenlaub
- Edited by: Deirdre Slevin
- Music by: Rachel Portman
- Production company: Walden Media
- Distributed by: 20th Century Fox
- Release dates: January 26, 2005 (USA Film Festival); February 18, 2005 (United States)
- Running time: 106 minutes
- Country: United States
- Language: English
- Budget: $14 million
- Box office: $33.5 million

Because of Winn-Dixie is a 2005 American comedy-drama family film based on Kate DiCamillo's 2000 novel of the same name, with the screenplay written by Joan Singleton, produced by Trevor Albert and directed by Wayne Wang. The film was produced by Walden Media and released by 20th Century Fox.

Because of Winn-Dixie stars Jeff Daniels, Cicely Tyson, Eva Marie Saint, Dave Matthews and AnnaSophia Robb in her feature film debut. It premiered at the USA Film Festival on January 26, 2005, and was theatrically released on February 18, 2005.

The film received mixed reviews from critics and earned $33.5 million against a production budget of $14 million. It was released on DVD and VHS on August 9, 2005 by 20th Century Fox Home Entertainment.

== Plot ==
Ten-year-old India Opal Buloni has just moved to the (fictional) small town of Naomi, Florida with her father, who is a preacher.

While shopping at Winn-Dixie, Opal encounters a scruffy Berger Picard who is wreaking havoc. Not wanting the manager to send the dog to the pound, Opal claims he is hers and names him "Winn-Dixie". The dog becomes friends with everyone he encounters, and Opal makes some friends in the process.

She also rekindles her relationship with her father; from him, she learns ten things about her mother, Benjean-Megan, who abandoned them when Opal was three. She describes the preacher as a turtle, always sticking his head into his shell, and never wanting to come out into the real world. Opal realizes this is likely because of how sad he is about the loss of her mother, who (according to her father) disliked being a preacher's wife.

One day, fed up with Winn-Dixie, grumpy Mr. Alfred, landlord of the Bulonis' trailer park, demands they get rid of him. The preacher calls the pound, but Opal begs to keep him. Unable to see her upset, he asks the pound to return Winn-Dixie, claiming he is not the same dog he called about. The preacher convinces Mr. Alfred to allow them three months to find Winn-Dixie a new home. Later on, it is revealed that Mr. Alfred is dealing with difficult feelings which impact how he interacts with the Bulonis and Winn-Dixie.

During her wanderings with Winn-Dixie, Opal meets Miss Franny Block, a kind and somewhat eccentric librarian, who tells her many great stories including one about a bear who invaded the library. Opal gets a job at a local business, Gertrude's Pets, and befriends manager Otis, a shy ex-convict with a passion for music. Opal also meets Gloria Dump, a partially blind African-American recovering alcoholic whose backyard has a "mistake tree" with beer bottles hanging from it. She tells Opal the bottles represent the ghosts of all the things she has done wrong. Opal also meets Sweetie Pie Thomas, a young girl eager to get a dog like Winn-Dixie.

With enough new friends, Opal and Gloria decide to host a party. Opal invites Otis, Sweetie Pie and her father, and takes a risk by inviting Mr. Alfred; after hesitating, he begrudgingly accepts. Opal also befriends and invites her former enemies, brothers Stevie and Dunlap Dewberry (who secretly like her), and her sour-faced neighbor Amanda Wilkinson. When Opal learns that Amanda lost her younger brother Carson to an accidental drowning the previous summer, it inspires her compassion.

During the party, a severe thunderstorm strikes. Winn-Dixie, with a pathological fear of storms, runs away. Opal and the preacher frantically search for him, but after a while her father (who admits he has grown to love Winn-Dixie) is discouraged and wants to give up. An upset Opal blames him for the loss of her mother and Winn-Dixie. The preacher tells her he tried very hard to look for her mother. He admits it was his fault that she left him, and believes she is never coming back. However, in a rare show of affection, he tells Opal how grateful he is that her mother left her with him.

When all the guests return to Gloria's party, Otis starts to play a song ("Glory, Glory") on his guitar and the preacher and others sing along. Opal and the others then hear Winn-Dixie outside howling; she lets him in and gratefully welcomes him back.

== Cast and crew ==
- AnnaSophia Robb as India Opal Buloni
- Jeff Daniels as Mr. Buloni "The Preacher"
- Cicely Tyson as Gloria Dump
- Dave Matthews as Otis
- Eva Marie Saint as Ms. Franny Block
- Elle Fanning as Sweetie Pie Thomas
- Courtney Jines as Amanda Wilkinson
- Luke Benward as Steven "Stevie" Dewberry
- Nick Price as Dunlap Dewberry
- B.J. Hopper as Mr. Alfred
- Harland Williams as Policeman

=== Animals ===
- Becca Lish as Gertrude (voice)
- Lyco and Scott as Winn-Dixie

== Production ==
The film was directed by Wayne Wang; produced by Trevor Albert, Walden Media, and Joan Singleton; distributed by 20th Century Fox; with music composed by Rachel Portman. It was shot on location in Napoleonville, Louisiana, with some shooting in Gibson, Louisiana. To make sure both dogs got on well with AnnaSophia Robb, who played Opal, she was brought in early to get acquainted with them and give them treats. By the time shooting started, they considered her a "safe" area. Winn-Dixie was played by multiple Picardy Shepherds, a rare breed from France. The DVD extra "Diamond in the Ruff" shows the two principal dogs named Scott and Lyco, but producer Trevor Albert mentions in the DVD feature commentary that, in all, four dogs were used. In the featurette "Meet Winn-Dixie" AnnaSophia Robb mentions that the stunt dog named Tasha jumped over the flour. The film's mouse was played by a rat. The choice was made carefully because while mice would have been preferable, rats are much easier to train.

Director Wayne Wang wanted to use Picardy Shepherds because he thought they looked similar to the depiction of Winn-Dixie from the book cover. Dogs were brought from France when none were available in the U.S. Just like the book, the film is set in Naomi, Florida, but filmed in Louisiana. The bunny that Otis hands Opal (at around 56 mins) is a Netherland Dwarf. They only get to be between 7.5 to 9 inches.

== Soundtrack ==
- "Opal's Blues" – The Be Good Tanyas
- "Won't Give In" – The Finn Brothers
- "Splish Splash" – Adam Schlesinger and James Iha
- "Sunflower" – Alice Peacock
- "The Clapping Song" – Shirley Ellis
- String Quartet #17 ("Hunt")
- "Butterfly" – Dave Matthews
- "Sunrise" – Norah Jones
- "Cabaret" – Emmylou Harris
- "I've Gotta See You Smile" - Leigh Nash
- "Glory Glory" – AnnaSophia Robb, Jeff Daniels, Cicely Tyson, Dave Matthews, Eva Marie Saint, Courtney Jines, Nick Price, Luke Benward, Elle Fanning, and B.J. Hopper
- "Glory Glory" – Patrinell Wright and Gloria Smith
- "Someday Somehow (Have It All)" – The Beu Sisters
- "Fly" – Shawn Colvin
- "Amazing Grace" – Rachel Portman

== Release ==
The film was released in cinemas in the USA on February 18, 2005. It was released on DVD and VHS on August 9, 2005, by 20th Century Fox Home Entertainment.

== Reception ==
The film received mixed reviews from critics. Rotten Tomatoes gives it a score of 55% based on 121 reviews, with an average rating of 5.9/10. The site's consensus was: "An old-fashioned, if bland, adaptation of Kate DiCamillo's novel." At Metacritic, it has a score of 54/100 based on 27 reviews, indicating "mixed or average" reviews. Audiences polled by CinemaScore gave the film an average grade of "A" on an A+ to F scale. The Independent Critic gave the film 3 stars and a B. He lowered the score from a B+ to a B after rewatching the film and noticing some flaws, but still recommends it because of its family friendly message.

== Awards ==
AnnaSophia Robb was nominated in several categories, Best Performance in a Feature Film (Comedy or Drama) – Leading Young Actress – Best Family Feature Film – Comedy or Musical, at the Young Artist Awards 2006 Best book awards.
