= A Very Brave Witch =

Children's book by Alison McGhee

- Author: Alison McGhee
- Illustrator: Harry Bliss
- Language: English
- Genre: children's book
- Published: 2006
- Publisher: Paula Wiseman Books/Simon and Schuster
- Publication place: United States
- ISBN: 978-0-689-86730-9

A Very Brave Witch is a children's book by Alison McGhee and illustrated by Harry Bliss. Released in 2006 by Simon and Schuster, it is about a young witch who is afraid of humans, until she meets one. The book was a New York Times bestseller and was adapted into an animated short in 2007.

== Synopsis ==
The book opens with a young witch talking about how she loves Halloween, from the decorations to the costumes. She then says that witches are terrified of humans, as they do not look like them. The little witch isn't afraid of them and goes to the nearby town to investigate them up close, in the process discovering that the neighborhood children are trick or treating. She initially misunderstands them to say that they are "trick a tree" and proceeds to perform aerial maneuvers on a nearby tree to show that she is best at "tricking a tree". This results in her falling off her broom. The children show concern for her, assuming that she is another human child in costume. Talking with them, she finds that they are not so bad and that one girl dressed as a witch has always dreamed of flying. This delights the young witch, who immediately invites her to fly on her broom. They soar off into the sky, much to the delight of the two children and the horror of the nearby adult witches.

== Release ==
A Very Brave Witch was first published in hardback on August 4, 2006, through Paula Wiseman Books. An audiobook adaptation narrated by Elle Fanning was published in 2007 through Weston Woods Studios; the work was also given a paperback and ebook release, again through Paula Wiseman Books.

The work sold well upon its initial release and placed on the New York Times' Bestseller List for Children's Books for the week of October 22, 2006.

== Reception ==
Kirkus Book Reviews wrote: "This gently humorous story is teamed with appealing, warm, yet appropriately spooky watercolors that depict the very brave witch on what is, naturally, her favorite holiday." and Publishers Weekly wrote: "Bliss channels Charles M. Schulz in his voice-bubble dialogue and expressive drawings of children with circular heads, simple mouths and dot-eyes with parentheses-shaped eyelids. Like Michael Rex's Brooms Are for Flying! and David Costello's Here They Come! , this tale demystifies the amiable protagonist and her non-green counterpart alike." The School Library Journal wrote:"Done in black ink and watercolor, the cartoon artwork captures the holiday's spirit with crisp fall colors and amusing details. Busy witches decorate their creepy-looking mansion by hanging skeletons, un-caging bats, and sprinkling spiders out the windows. In the "Sub-Basement Costume Unit," a seamstress is hard at work sewing a monster paw; costumes line the walls (Frankenstein, a space creature, etc.); and politician masks share space with a jar full of eyeballs." Common Sense Media wrote:"Witches, ghosts, and robbers all make appearances, and while their presence might raise tensions for the youngest children, nothing truly scary happens." It was a New York Times Bestselling Book.

Rebecca Young reviewed the book for the New York Times News Service, calling it endearing. AudioFile reviewed the audiobook adaptation, praising Fanning for her voice and inflections.

== Film adaptation ==
An animated short cartoon based on the book was released in 2007 by Weston Woods Studios. The film, directed by Virginia Wilkos, features the voice of actress Elle Fanning in the lead role. It was also released on DVD in 2009.

== See also ==
- Halloween
- Teeny-Tiny and the Witch-Woman, a similar children's book about a witch
