= Mercy Watson series =

Children's book series by Kate DiCamillo

- Cover of the first book in The Mercy Watson series
- Mercy Watson to the Rescue (2005); Mercy Watson Goes for a Ride (2006); Mercy Watson Fights Crime (2006); Mercy Watson, Princess in Disguise (2007); Mercy Watson Thinks Like a Pig (2008); Mercy Watson: Something Wonky This Way Comes (2009); A Piglet Named Mercy (2019); A Very Mercy Christmas (2022)
- Author: Kate DiCamillo
- Country: United States
- Language: English
- Genre: Children's fiction
- Publisher: Candlewick Press
- Published: 2005–2022
- Media type: Print (hardcover and paperback)

Mercy Watson is a series of children's books written by American author Kate DiCamillo and illustrated by Chris Van Dusen. The eponymous Mercy Watson is a fictional pig - often described as a "porcine wonder" by her owners Mrs. and Mr. Watson - who loves toast with 'a great deal of butter on it'.

Mercy Watson Goes for a Ride was a Theodor Seuss Geisel Honor Book in 2007 — one of three runners-up for the Geisel Award.

Eight Mercy Watson books were published from 2005 to 2022 by Candlewick Press of Somerville, Massachusetts.

== Books ==
- Mercy Watson to the Rescue (2005)
- Mercy Watson Goes for a Ride (2006)
- Mercy Watson Fights Crime (2006)
- Mercy Watson, Princess in Disguise (2007)
- Mercy Watson Thinks Like a Pig (2008)
- Mercy Watson: Something Wonky This Way Comes (2009)
- A Piglet Named Mercy (2019)
- A Very Mercy Christmas (2022)

=== Tales from Deckawoo Drive series ===
- Leroy Ninker Saddles Up (2014)
- Francine Poulet Meets the Ghost Raccoon (2015)
- Where Are You Going, Baby Lincoln? (2016)
- Eugenia Lincoln and the Unexpected Package (2017)
- Stella Endicott and the Anything-Is-Possible Poem (2020)
- Franklin Endicott and the Third Key (2021)
- Mercy Watson is Missing! (2023)

== Geisel Honor Book ==
Mercy Watson Goes for a Ride (ISBN 0-763-62332-6) was one of three Geisel Honor Books (runners-up for the Geisel Award) in 2007.
