= Teeny-Tiny and the Witch-Woman =

1975 novel

- First edition
- Author: Barbara K. Walker
- Illustrator: Michael Foreman
- Publisher: Pantheon Books
- Publication date: 1975

Teeny-Tiny and the Witch-Woman is a story written by Barbara K. Walker and illustrated by Michael Foreman based on a Turkish version of "Hansel and Gretel". The story was first published in 1975 by Pantheon Books and an animated short based on the story was produced by Weston Woods on May 31, 1980, directed by Gene Deitch.

== Plot ==
Three brothers are warned daily by their mother not to venture into the woods adjacent to their village; according to their grandmother, the forest is the domain of a "Witch-Woman" who eats children and uses their bones to build a fence around her house. One day, the two elder brothers, Big-One and In-the-Middle, take a chance and willingly enter the forest, unafraid of the supposed Witch-Woman. Teeny-Tiny, the youngest brother, reluctantly follows them, but keeps "[his] eyes open and [his] legs ready to run". The boys spend all afternoon playing in the forest, but when it grows dark, the three become lost, hungry and tired. Searching for a way out of the woods, Teeny-Tiny climbs a tree and spots a light in the distance. He and his brothers follow the light to a cottage owned by a grotesque old woman who offers them food and shelter for the night.

While Big-One and In-the-Middle sleep, the restless Teeny-Tiny looks out of the bedroom window and notices a knobby white fence made of children's bones. As Teeny-Tiny realizes that their hostess is the Witch-Woman, she calls out to the boys to ascertain their collective slumber. Teeny-Tiny resists sleep and contrives a series of bedtime rituals to stall for time, eventually requesting water in a sieve. When the Witch-Woman prepares for this task, Teeny-Tiny overhears her placing three magic objects upon a kitchen shelf: a bar of soap, a sewing needle, and a short knife.

Teeny-Tiny wakes his brothers and warns them of the Witch-Woman, and the three brothers escape, with Teeny-Tiny stealing the three magic objects. The Witch-Woman, still engrossed in her futile chore, catches sight of the fleeing boys and gives chase. Teeny-Tiny uses the magic objects to maintain a distance from the pursuing Witch-Woman. The soap creates a mountain of foam, and the needle multiplies into a mountain of needles, but they prove only slight obstacles to the Witch-Woman, who maneuvers around both mountains. However, the knife carves a canyon too long and wide for the Witch-Woman to run around or jump over, allowing Teeny-Tiny and his brothers to return safely home.

== Animated short ==
An animated short based on Barbara K. Walker's book was created by Weston Woods Studios in 1980. The short is a retelling of the story featuring frightening and sometimes amusing imagery. The short was first released on 16mm film for use in schools and libraries. This short has also been featured on a number of collections of other scary stories such as the Children's Circle video series and some holiday collections by Scholastic Books. The short was directed by Weston Woods Studios director Gene Deitch. The film was added to the ALA Notable Children's Videos list in 1980.

== See also ==
- Baba Yaga
- Halloween
- A Very Brave Witch, a similar book about a witch
