= Bagram Ibatoulline =

Russian-born artist who has illustrated books for young people

- Born: Omsk, Russia
- Education: Kazan Art School; Surikov Art Institute
- Occupations: Artist and illustrator
- Writing career
- Notable awards: Boston Globe–Horn Book Award (2006)

Bagram Ibatoulline is a Russian-born artist who has illustrated numerous books for younger readers written by Philip Booth, Kate DiCamillo, Michelle Houts, Stephen Mitchell, Linda Sue Park, Lois Lowry and others. His illustrations have been noted in reviews in The New York Times, Kirkus Reviews, The Wall Street Journal, and other national publications. Maria Russo wrote in 2019 that "Ibatoulline’s realistic watercolors astound and enchant, as always."

Ibatoulline was raised in Omsk, and at the age of 15 his family moved from Omsk to Kazan. After finishing his secondary education there, he spent four years as a student at the Kazan Art School. He served in the Russian army, and then entered the Surikov Art Institute in Moscow. He emigrated to the United States in 1991. His first book as an illustrator was Crossing (2001); the book is based on a poem by Philip Booth, and its narrative is created by its illustrations.

== Books ==
=== The Miraculous Journey of Edward Tulane ===
Cover art for the illustrated book The Miraculous Journey of Edward Tulane written by Kate DiCamillo and illustrated by Ibatoulline.

Kate DiCamillo and Ibatoulline received the 2006 Boston Globe–Horn Book Award for The Miraculous Journey of Edward Tulane. Michael Hearn's review in The New York Times noted that "Bagram Ibatoulline's haunting color plates and sepia illustrations at the beginning of each chapter evoke the era of Andrew Wyeth, Howard Pyle and Maxfield Parrish." In 2012, it was ranked number 59 among all-time children's novels in a survey published by School Library Journal .

=== Great Joy by Kate DiCamillo ===
In 2007, Bagram Ibatoulline illustrated Kate DiCamillo's first picture book, Great Joy, a Christmas picture book.
