= National Ambassador for Young People's Literature =

Literary honor

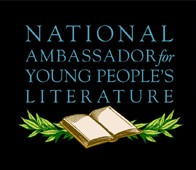
Logo for National Ambassador for Young People's Literature

National Ambassador for Young People's Literature is a literary honor presented bi-annually by the Library of Congress to an author or illustrator who is a U.S. citizen and who has made a substantial contribution to young people's literature. The position was established in 2008. More than receiving an award, during their tenure ambassadors help communicate to children about books and reading, so the selection criteria include being an effective communicator, having a dynamic personality and the ability to work with children. The position is modeled on the British Children's Laureate, which was established in 1999. The position is currently sponsored by the Center for the Book and the Children's Book Council. The ambassadorship includes a $15,000 expense stipend. A similar honor is awarded bi-annually by the Poetry Foundation for the Young People's Poet Laureate (formerly the Children's Poet Laureate).

== Ambassadors ==
- 2008–2009: Jon Scieszka
- 2010–2011: Katherine Paterson
- 2012–2013: Walter Dean Myers
- 2014–2015: Kate DiCamillo
- 2016–2017: Gene Luen Yang
- 2018-2019: Jacqueline Woodson
- 2020-2022 Jason Reynolds
- 2023-2024 Meg Medina
- 2025–2026: Mac Barnett
