= Flora & Ulysses =

2013 children's novel by Kate DiCamillo

- First edition
- Author: Kate DiCamillo
- Illustrator: K.G. Campbell
- Language: English
- Genre: Children's
- Publisher: Candlewick Press
- Publication date: 2013
- Publication place: United States
- Pages: 231 pp

Flora & Ulysses: The Illuminated Adventures is a children's novel by American author Kate DiCamillo and illustrated by K.G. Campbell, published in 2013 by Candlewick Press. It tells the story of Flora Belle Buckman and a squirrel named Ulysses. The illustrations include full-page and small pencil drawings, together with comic-book panels describing the gang's adventures.

== Plot ==
Set in the 21st century in a suburb town of Vancouver, British Columbia, Canada, Flora Belle Buckman, a self-proclaimed cynic, spends her time reading comic books and struggling to understand her parents’ recent divorce. She is jolted into action when the neighbor runs over a squirrel with a vacuum cleaner. The vacuum cleaner is her neighbor's present for his wife. The squirrel's brush with death causes him to develop superpowers, allowing him to understand humans and become smarter. Flora then names the squirrel Ulysses after the vacuum cleaner that ran him over. Flora sneaks him inside and explains to Ulysses that he must use his newfound powers to right wrongs, fight injustice, "or something." She then shows Ulysses The Amazing Adventures of Incandesto!, the comic that she has been reading. Later, that night, Ulysses decides to write on Flora's mother's typewriter, revealing he can write poetry and that he is actually good at it as well.

Next, Flora's mother asks Flora's father to kill the squirrel, but he does not wish to do so. Flora oversees their conversation and then gets suspicious. On a drive to her father's house, she questions him. Her father, wanting to stall, asks if she and Ulysses want to eat. In the diner, Ulysses flies and gets hurt. After they leave, they visit a nice doctor, who grew up in Blundermeecen. She shares some wisdom with the group. But before they can leave, a cat named Mr. Klaus jumps on Flora's father's head. Ulysses then throws the cat off his head and onto the floor.

When they come home, Flora asks her mother about her desire to kill Ulysses, and a shouting match erupts in which Flora comes to believe her mother does not love her. Flora, feeling hurt, declares that she will go home with her father. Ulysses writes a poem to explain Flora and her mother's real emotions, but Flora's mother kidnaps him before the poem can be read. Flora puts together a crack team to rescue Ulysses, who has already escaped, leaving Flora's mother to read his poem. The cast reunites in the father's apartment building, where Flora's cynical exterior is cracked for good as she realizes her mother truly loves her.

== Awards ==
Flora & Ulysses won the Newbery Medal for 2014.

== Reception ==
The Horn Book review described the book as "heartwarming" with plenty of humor and a "quirky supporting cast", and notes that the illustrations "accentuate the mood".

== Film adaptation ==
On May 31, 2018, it was announced that Disney was developing a film adaptation of the novel for their streaming service, Disney+, with Brad Copeland writing the script. Matilda Lawler stars as Flora, and her parents are played by Alyson Hannigan and Ben Schwartz. The film was released on February 19, 2021, streaming on Disney+.

Awards
Preceded by The One and Only Ivan	Newbery Medal recipient 2014	Succeeded by The Crossover
