= Candlewick Press =

Publishing company

- Parent company: Walker Books Ltd. (Trustbridge Global Media)
- Founded: 1992
- Founder: Sebastian Walker
- Country of origin: United States
- Headquarters location: Somerville, Massachusetts
- Distribution: Penguin Random House Publisher Services
- Publication types: Books
- Nonfiction topics: Children's literature
- Fiction genres: Children's literature
- Imprints: Templar Books; Big Picture Press; Candlewick Entertainment; Candlewick Studio; MIT Kids Press; MITeen Press
- No. of employees: 130
- Official website: www.candlewick.com

Candlewick Press, established in 1992 and located in Somerville, Massachusetts, is part of the Walker Books Group. The logo depicting a bear carrying a candle is based on Walker Books' original logo.

== History ==
Sebastian Walker launched Walker Books from his spare bedroom in his London home in 1978. Walker Books grew and he founded Candlewick Press in 1992. Candlewick Press opened with only six employees and now has more than one hundred.

== Publications ==
Candlewick was first known for picture books but expanded to include board books, novelty books, e-books and middle-grade and young adult fiction and non-fiction. Candlewick is an important children's book publisher thanks to publications such as a series known as the Ologies; Robert Sabuda and Matthew Reinhart's pop-up books; the Judy Moody and Stink franchises from author Megan McDonald and illustrator Peter H. Reynolds; Guess How Much I Love You; Martin Handford's Where's Waldo? books; Lucy Cousins' Maisy books, and National Book Award winner The Astonishing Life of Octavian Nothing, Volume 1: The Pox Party by M. T. Anderson. Candlewick's books continue to be in demand as demonstrated by recent The New York Times bestsellers I Want My Hat Back and This Is Not My Hat (also winner of the 2012 Caldecott Medal) by Jon Klassen and Timmy Failure: Mistakes Were Made by Stephan Pastis.

Candlewick Press is home to author Kate DiCamillo, having published her first novel, Because of Winn-Dixie (a Newbery Honor Book), along with The Tiger Rising (a National Book Award finalist), The Tale of Despereaux and Flora & Ulysses (Newbery Medal winners), The Miraculous Journey of Edward Tulane (a Boston Globe–Horn Book Award winner), the Mercy Watson series and Tales from Deckawoo Drive series of early readers, and The Magician's Elephant. Candlewick also published a novel Merci Suárez Changes Gears by Meg Medina, who became the 2023-2024 National Ambassador for Young People's Literature.

M. T. Anderson, author of the award-winning Octavian Nothing series of speculative historical fiction, is another of Candlewick's authors.

The Walker Books Group is made up of Candlewick Press, Walker Books UK and Walker Books Australia. In May 2020, the group was acquired by Trustbridge Global Media.

== Imprints ==
=== Templar Books ===
Templar Books is Candlewick's first imprint and is a partnership between Candlewick Press and Templar Publishing in the UK. This imprint publishes picture books, novelty books and board books. Notable titles include Jonny Duddle's The Pirates Next Door and Levi Pinfold's Black Dog, which received the Kate Greenaway Medal in 2013.

=== Big Picture Press ===
Big Picture Press was launched in the Fall of 2013 and publishes illustrated and high-quality books for readers of all ages. The imprint was developed by Templar Publishing in the U.K. as an alternative to digital publishing. Notable titles include Maps by Aleksandra Mizielinska and Daniel Mizielinski, and the Welcome to the Museum series.

=== Candlewick Entertainment ===
Candlewick Entertainment was launched in Spring 2014 to publish media-related children's books and TV and movie tie-ins, including Peppa Pig.

=== Candlewick Studio ===
Candlewick Studio was launched in Fall 2016 and publishes design-centric books with creators such as Ingela P. Arrhenius, élo, David Ellwand, Aaron Becker, and Carme Lemniscates.

=== MIT Kids Press and MITeen Press ===
In Fall 2021, Candlewick Press and the MIT Press launeched The MIT Kids Press and MITeen Press imprints, presenting STEAM topics for young people and young adults.
