= Because of Winn-Dixie =

2000 children's novel written by Kate DiCamillo

- First edition
- Author: Kate DiCamillo
- Language: English
- Genre: Children's novel
- Publisher: Candlewick Press (US); Walker Books (UK)
- Publication date: March 2000
- Publication place: United States
- Media type: Print (hardback & paperback)
- Pages: 182 pp.
- ISBN: 0-7636-0776-2
- OCLC: 41601218

Because of Winn-Dixie is a children's novel written by American author Kate DiCamillo published in the year 2000. It was adapted as a 2005 family film directed by Wayne Wang, produced by Walden Media and Twentieth Century Fox, and starring AnnaSophia Robb as Opal Buloni.

== Plot ==
A 10-year-old girl named India Opal Buloni has just moved to a trailer park in the small town of Naomi, Florida, with her father, who is known as The Preacher because he preaches at the local church. Her mother, Benjean-Megan, abandoned them when Opal was three. She describes The Preacher as a turtle, always sticking his head into his shell, and never wanting to come out into the real world. This is most likely because of how sad he is about her mother, with whom he is still in love.

While in the supermarket, Opal sees a scruffy dog wrecking the store and decides to take him home, naming him Winn-Dixie after the supermarket chain. Miss Franny Block, a librarian, shares great stories about her past, including one about her great-grandfather, whose family members died while he was fighting for the South in the Civil War. He invented Littmus Lozenge candies, which are sweet but include a secret ingredient—melancholy. Anyone who tasted the candies tasted sweetness mixed with sadness. Opal learns that her sour-faced neighbor, Amanda Wilkinson, lost her younger brother Carson when he drowned in the town lake the previous summer. She vows to be nicer to her from then on.

Opal finds a dog collar that she wants to buy for Winn-Dixie, but she has no money and decides to work for the pet store to earn it. Otis, a worker at Gertrude's Pets, is unwilling to hire Opal as a cleaning girl, but she comes to work. When Opal and Winn-Dixie step into the store, the animals panic when they see the big dog. Otis plays his guitar to calm them. Opal learns that Otis once went to prison for battering a police officer who tried to confiscate his guitar after telling Otis he couldn't play music on the street because he was disturbing to others.

As Opal rides her bike and Winn-Dixie runs ahead of her, they meet a woman named Gloria Dump, who's a recovering alcoholic. She and Opal become good friends, and Opal begins reading Gone with the Wind to her since Gloria has poor eyesight (this was changed to David Copperfield in the 20th anniversary release). Opal and Gloria decide to host a small party, inspired by the one in Gone with the Wind, inviting everyone they know. In the process, Opal becomes a friend to her former enemies, the brothers Stevie and Dunlap Dewberry. She also invites Amanda Wilkinson and Sweetie Pie Thomas, a younger girl who has no pet, and so has fallen in love with Winn-Dixie. Otis and Miss Franny Block are also invited.

Opal and Gloria set up everything outdoors, but it starts to rain, so they bring the party indoors. Opal can't find Winn-Dixie anywhere, even after searching the town. Ten minutes later she returns to Gloria's home to discover that Winn-Dixie has been there all the time, hiding because he is scared of storms. The book ends with Otis playing his guitar and everyone singing one of The Preacher's songs, being happy as a community.

== Reception ==
Because of Winn-Dixie was the winner of a Newbery Honor distinction the year after publication. In 2000, the book won the Josette Frank Award, and in 2003 won the Mark Twain Readers Award.

In 2007 the U.S. National Education Association listed Winn-Dixie as one of its "Teachers' Top 100 Books for Children", based on an online poll. In 2012 it was ranked number 20 on a list of the top 100 children's novels published by School Library Journal, the first of three books by DiCamillo in the Top 100. Because of Winn-Dixie has also received favorable reviews from critics of children's literature, who praise the book's treatment of themes like friendship and forgiveness. Another reviewer—largely echoing these same sentiments—argues that the Opal's rich and varied emotions are part of what make her character so likable, and so life-like. Other critics express how the novel teaches truthful lessons to all ages about how people should be treated.

== Adaptations ==
The novel was adapted as a 2005 family film directed by Wayne Wang, produced by Walden Media and 20th Century Fox, and starring AnnaSophia Robb as Opal Buloni.

A musical based on the novel debuted at the Arkansas Repertory Theatre on December 5, 2013. John Tartaglia directed the play while Nell Benjamin wrote the book and lyrics and Duncan Sheik wrote the music. The musical was a part of Goodspeed Musicals' 2019 season, playing from June to September, and was directed by John Rando.
