= National Sawdust =

Music venue in Brooklyn NY

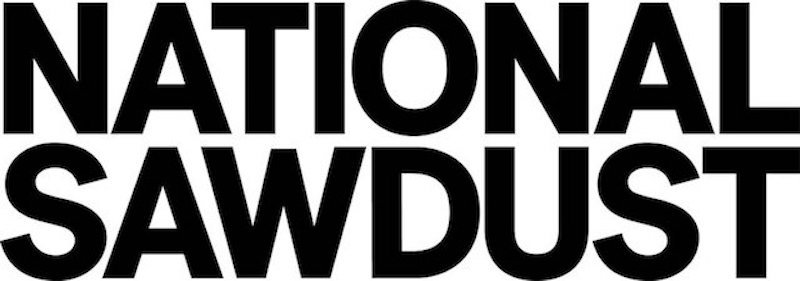
- Formation: 2015
- Type: Nonprofit music producer and venue
- Purpose: "To provide composers and musicians across genres a home in which they can flourish, a setting where they are given unprecedented support and critical resources essential to create and share their work."
- Location: 80 North 6th Street, Brooklyn, New York 11249
- Coordinates: 40°43′8.0472″N 73°57′40.824″W
- Co-founder and Artistic Director: Paola Prestini
- Website: https://nationalsawdust.org

National Sawdust is a nonprofit music producer and venue in Brooklyn, New York with the goal of providing "composers and musicians across genres... a setting where they are given unprecedented support and critical resources essential to create and share their work." The organization is named after its building's original tenant, an early 20th century sawdust factory by the same name. It was founded in 2015 by composer Paola Prestini and attorney Kevin Dolan. Since then, National Sawdust has featured artists and ensembles including Philip Glass, Yo-Yo Ma, Nico Muhly, Yo La Tengo, Eydís Evensen, Chris Thile, Pussy Riot, Caroline Polachek, Tanya Tagaq, Agnes Obel, Joan Tower, John Corigliano, the International Contemporary Ensemble, yMusic, Missy Mazzoli, Royce Vavrek, Du Yun, Karole Armitage, Anthony Roth Costanzo, Ser Serpas, and Daniela Lalita.

== History ==
The National Sawdust Company was a sawdust factory in operation in industrial Williamsburg, Brooklyn during the late 19th century and early 20th century. It closed in the mid 20th century, leaving the space empty for many decades. The impossibly massive timbers suffered from dry rot and it succumbed like many of the historic industrial buildings in the area to repurposing for residential and commercial spaces, displacing the artisans, fabricators, meat packers, and performers who used the formerly inexpensive spaces for studios, performance centers, illegal apartments and fabrication shops. The end of North 6th Street, once the home of legendary performance venues like Galapagos and Northsix and design collectives Faile, Scrapile, Smiley, Hermann, Brady Dollarhide, Bass Mind, SHINta and Woodylee, now hosts a more elite crowd that demands a contemporary and safer environment. On the National Sawdust block you'll now find high end furniture stores and a Patagonia store. The formerly great Northsix is now Music Hall of Williamsburg, run by the corporate power of Bowery Presents, serving up more politically correct performers. Galapagos is apartments and a high design furniture store. By 2015, the National Sawdust Company building was one of few original structures remaining in Williamsburg, and it was surrounded by new developments.

Kevin Dolan, an attorney, organist, and philanthropist based in New York City with a passion for contemporary music, began planning to create a new concert hall in 2008. He asked composer Paola Prestini to join him as the Co-founder and Artistic Director of the organization.

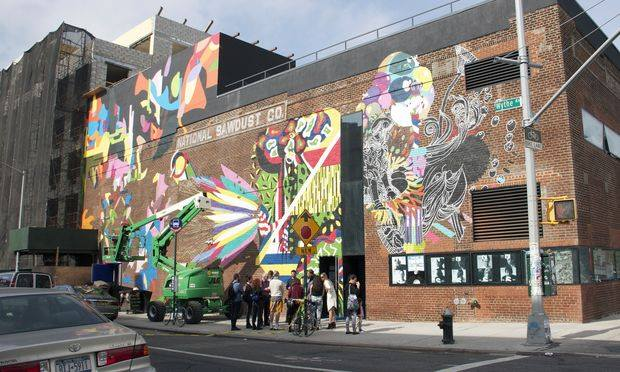
The exterior of the National Sawdust building, featuring a mural by artist Assume Vivid Astro Focus.

Beginning in 2008, Bureau V Architecture worked alongside SLAB Architecture and acoustic design consultant Arup New York to remodel the interior of the space. The concert hall was designed based on computer modeling and acoustic tests. For example, to protect the space from outside noise and vibration, it was constructed as a concrete room suspended by a chassis of springs within the original building. Other than the addition of a mural by artist Eli Sudbrack, the exterior of the building was left unchanged; the words "National Sawdust Co.," dating back to the building's original tenant, are still visible from the outside.

In its inaugural performance on October 1, 2015, National Sawdust featured Philip Glass, Nico Muhly, Chris Thile, Glenn Kotche, and Eve Gigliotti. In 2016 alone, the organization hosted over 500 performances.

== Strategy ==
National Sawdust has the goal of providing "composers and musicians across genres... a setting where they are given unprecedented support and critical resources essential to create and share their work."

Every season, National Sawdust selects several curators to fill its calendar with a wide array of musical performances. These performances feature both up-and-coming and established artists from around the world, performing classical, experimental, electronic, rock and roll, folk, and other genres of music. In addition to providing a performance space for these musicians, the organization gives young artists the professional assistance necessary to grow their careers, including workshops, marketing assistance, and an artist in residency program. The Artists in residency program, introduced in the fifth season, includes commissions up to $15,000 and access to the organization's performance space, the ability to curate concerts, and the opportunity to record their music. National Sawdust partners with Juilliard to debut the BluePrint Fellowship Program. In 2020, National Sawdust announced a New Works Commissions series, including award-winning composers whose work would be performed by the JACK Quartet and National Sawdust Ensemble.

== Associated artists ==
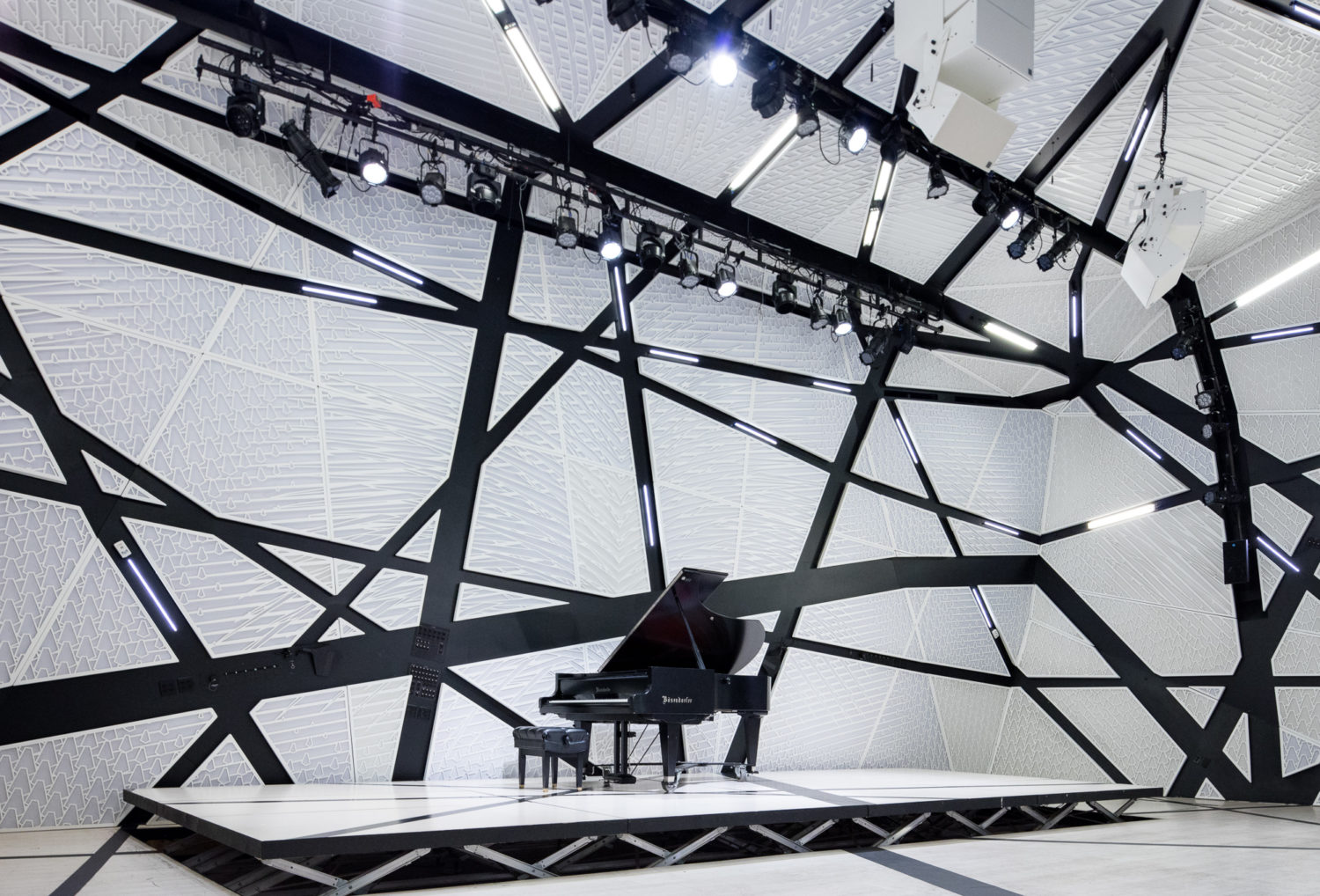
The interior of the National Sawdust performance venue.

- Co-founder and Artistic Director Paola Prestini
- Composer Philip Glass
- Cellist Yo-Yo Ma
- Operatic soprano Renée Fleming
- Bryce Dessner of The National (band)
- Musician Meredith Monk
- Composer Joan Tower
- Composer Missy Mazzoli
- Composer Du Yun
- Composer David Lang
- Composer Nico Muhly
- Choreographer Karole Armitage
- Countertenor Anthony Roth Costanzo
- Rock band Yo La Tengo
- Chris Thile of Punch Brothers
- Glenn Kotche of Wilco
- Jeffrey Ziegler of the Kronos Quartet
- Russian punk-rock band Pussy Riot
- Composer John Corigliano
- The International Contemporary Ensemble
- Chamber ensemble yMusic
- Producer Beth Morrison
- Mexican jazz singer Magos Herrera
- Composer Theo Bleckmann
- Composer-performer Sarah Hennies
