= The Tale of Despereaux (film) =

2008 British-American adventure comedy film

- Theatrical release poster
- Directed by: Sam Fell; Rob Stevenhagen
- Screenplay by: Gary Ross
- Story by: Will McRobb; Chris Viscardi
- Based on: The Tale of Despereaux by Kate DiCamillo
- Produced by: Gary Ross; Allison Thomas
- Starring: Matthew Broderick; Robbie Coltrane; Dustin Hoffman; Richard Jenkins; Kevin Kline; Frank Langella; William H. Macy; James Nesbitt; Tracey Ullman; Sigourney Weaver
- Cinematography: Brad Blackbourn
- Edited by: Mark Solomon
- Music by: William Ross
- Production companies: Universal Animation Studios; Relativity Media; Larger Than Life Productions; Framestore Animation
- Distributed by: Universal Pictures
- Release dates: December 7, 2008 (ArcLight Hollywood); December 19, 2008 (United States and United Kingdom)
- Running time: 93 minutes
- Countries: United States; United Kingdom
- Language: English
- Budget: $60 million
- Box office: $90.5 million

The Tale of Despereaux (/ˈdɛspəroʊ/ DESP-ər-oh) is a 2008 animated fantasy adventure comedy film loosely based on the 2003 novel of the same name by Kate DiCamillo. It was directed by Sam Fell and Rob Stevenhagen, and written by Gary Ross, based on a story by Will McRobb and Chris Viscardi. It features the voices of Matthew Broderick, Robbie Coltrane, Dustin Hoffman, Richard Jenkins, Kevin Kline, Frank Langella, William H. Macy, James Nesbitt, and Tracey Ullman, with Sigourney Weaver narrating the film.

The Tale of Despereaux premiered at ArcLight Hollywood on December 7, 2008, before being theatrically released in the United States and the United Kingdom on December 19, by Universal Pictures. It received mixed reviews from critics and was a box-office disappointment, grossing $90 million worldwide on a budget of $60 million.

== Plot ==
Sailor Pietro and his rat companion Roscuro arrive in Dor, an enchanting medieval French kingdom renowned for its exquisite soups, during Dor's annual "Royal Soup Day". Chef Andre, the kingdom's culinary maestro, crafts his delectable creations with the help of Boldo, a magical culinary genie residing in his pot. However, Roscuro's curiosity leads him to the royal banquet hall, where his accidental plunge into Queen Rosemary's soup triggers a heart attack, claiming her life. Disheartened by the tragic turn of events, Roscuro discovers that Pietro has left him behind to fend for himself in the castle's dungeons. Roscuro finds shelter with Botticelli Remorso, the enigmatic leader of Dor's rat population. However, he struggles to adapt to their warlike culture. Meanwhile, grief-stricken King Philip bans all things soup-related, declaring rats illegal. This prohibition not only prevents Andre from making his beloved soup but also drives Boldo away. Dor, devoid of the life-giving soup, slowly fades into poverty and despair. Princess Pea, deeply affected by her father's grief, mourns the kingdom's decline and her own isolation from the world.

In a mouse village within an abandoned kitchen storage room, Despereaux is born into the Tilling family. The newborn Despereaux is immediately noted by his family for his large ears and for not being born blind or crying. As he grows up, it is clear he is different from other mice; he is brave and curious rather than timid, unnerving other mice around him. In an effort to teach him to be a "proper mouse", his brother Furlough takes him to the royal library to show him how to chew books, but Despereaux is more interested in reading them, becoming fascinated by their stories. One day, Despereaux encounters Pea, promising to finish the story about a trapped princess and tell her how it ends. Upon discovering that Despereaux has violated mouse law by talking to a human, his parents, Lester and Antoinette, turn him over to the mouse council to avoid blame.

The council banishes Despereaux for the crime of having courage. The "threadmaster", a blind mouse named Hovis, lowers Despereaux into the dungeons using a red thread, where he is presumed dead by the rest of the mice. In the dungeons, Despereaux tells the princess story to the jailer, Gregory, who stops listening and leaves him alone. Despereaux is kidnapped by the rats and thrown into their arena with a tabby cat. As Despereaux is about to be eaten, Roscuro saves his life by asking Botticelli to give Despereaux to him under the pretense of eating, appearing to relent to the sewer rat dogma.

Having been unable to adjust to being a sewer rat, Roscuro is desperate to hear about the outside world. The two become friends, as every day, Despereaux tells him stories of the princess and her sadness. Wishing to make amends for the trouble he has caused, Roscuro sneaks into Pea's room and tries to apologize to her, but she lashes out at him, and guards come after him. Hurt by this, Roscuro vows revenge. He enlists the help of Miggery "Mig" Sow, Pea's young, hearing-impaired maid who longs to be a princess by convincing her she can take Pea's place if she captures her. After Mig drags Pea to the dungeons, Roscuro double-crosses her and locks her in a cell.

Meanwhile, Despereaux discovers that the princess is captured, and he tries to tell the King, who is too depressed to listen. Despereaux tries to get help elsewhere; he returns to the mouse village and tries to enlist his family, but they are afraid of his presence — for he has fallen in flour, so they mistake him for returning as a ghost — so he rings the town's bell to prove his survival, but still no one comes to his aid. Andre hears the bell, reminding him of the time he made soup, and, having had enough of the law, gets back to making soup, which brings back Boldo. Despereaux tries to get help from Andre and Boldo, with limited success. As Andre is distracted by a rainy thunderstorm (which was caused by the smell of the soup being released into the sky), Boldo agrees and takes Despereaux back to the dungeons. En route, they are attacked by rats; Boldo sacrifices himself to allow Despereaux to reach the arena.

In the arena, Roscuro sees the apologetic sincerity in Pea's eyes and regrets his actions. Still, an enraged Botticelli signals the rats to eat Pea. Despereaux releases the cat to chase some of the rats away, and fights off the others. Botticelli captures Despereaux, but the rain clouds part and sunlight reflects off a lost heart-shaped locket into the dungeon, stunning the photophobic sewer rats. Roscuro saves Despereaux by using one of the arena's spotlights to direct the sunlight at Botticelli, sending him falling into the arena, where the cat pursues him into its cage; Pea shuts in both of them with her feet, leaving Botticelli to be eaten as the rest of the sewer rats flee into the shadows.

In the aftermath, Mig is reunited with Gregory, who turns out to be her long-lost father, and they return together to their farm. Meanwhile, the King finally overcomes his grief and allows soup and rats back into the kingdom; it stops raining, and the sun rises over Dor; Roscuro returns to his life at sea; Despereaux, who also inspired the mice to be brave just like him, departs on a journey to see the world.

== Voice cast ==
- Matthew Broderick as Despereaux Tilling, a brave mouse who does not run from danger, as mice should
- Dustin Hoffman as Chiaroscuro "Roscuro", a civilized rat who arrives on a ship and is taken in by Botticelli
- Emma Watson as Princess Pea, the human Princess of Dor who befriends Despereaux
- Tracey Ullman as Miggery "Mig" Sow, Princess Pea's servant girl
- Ciarán Hinds as Botticelli Remorso, the gaunt and sadistic leader of the rat world
- Robbie Coltrane as Gregory, the jailer and Mig's long-lost father
- William H. Macy as Lester Tilling, Despereaux's father
- Tony Hale as Furlough Tilling, Despereaux's older brother
- Kevin Kline as Chef Andre, the royal cook.
- Stanley Tucci as Boldo, Andre's Arcimboldo-esque soup genie and friend
- Frank Langella as The Mayor of the mouse world
- Frances Conroy as Antoinette Tilling, Despereaux's mother
- Richard Jenkins as The Principal at Despereaux's school
- Christopher Lloyd as Hovis, the threadmaster in the mouse world
- Charles Shaughnessy as Pietro, the sailor whom Roscuro accompanied to Dor
- Sam Fell as Ned, Mig's uncle; Smudge, a rat
- Patricia Cullen as Queen Rosemary, Princess Pea's late mother, who died from a heart attack
- Jane Karen as Louise
- Bronson Pinchot as The Town Crier
- McNally Sagal as the teacher at Despereaux's school
- James Nesbitt (uncredited) as King Philip of Dor, Princess Pea's father
- Sigourney Weaver as The Narrator

== Production ==
The film's production was marred by disagreements and malpractice, or accusations thereof, between the French, British, and American staff. Sylvain Chomet was employed early by Gary Ross and Allison Thomas as director, before the film was approved for funding by Relativity Media, with pre-production (including character design, the first drafts of the screenplay written by Will McRobb and Chris Viscardi, and the addition of the original character of Boldo) taking place at his studio, Django Films in Edinburgh. Chomet came up against creative and ethical differences with the producers and was eventually fired from the project and thrown out of the studio space allocated to the film. Mike Johnson was hired to replace Chomet as director, before the role went to Sam Fell and Rob Stevenhagen.

== Soundtrack ==
The Tale of Despereaux (Original Motion Picture Soundtrack)

Film score by William Ross
- Released: December 16, 2008
- Recorded: 2008
- Studio: Sony Pictures Scoring Stage
- Genre: Film score
- Length: 59:04
- Labels: Back Lot; Intrada
- Compiler: William Ross

The score of The Tale of Despereaux was composed and conducted by William Ross, who recorded his score with the Hollywood Studio Symphony at the Sony Scoring Stage. The soundtrack was released on December 16, 2008, by Back Lot Music and Intrada Records. The soundtrack includes the songs "Soup" and "It's Great To Be a Rat", both written by Dave Stewart, Gary Ross, and Glen Ballard.

=== Track listing ===
All music is composed by William Ross unless noted otherwise.

No.	Title	Writer(s)	Length
1.	"Soup"	Dave Stewart; Gary Ross; Glen Ballard	1:43
2.	"It's Great To Be a Rat"	Stewart; Ross; Ballard	1:23
3.	"Main Title / Prologue"		2:38
4.	"The Village Of Dor"		2:17
5.	"Andre & Bolbo"		1:27
6.	"The Soup Is Served"		1:11
7.	"Roscuro's Fall"		2:42
8.	"A King's Sadness"		2:00
9.	"Mouse World / A Mouse Is Born"		3:11
10.	"Lonely Roscuro"		1:15
11.	"The Royal Library"		1:30
12.	"Once Upon a Time"		2:30
13.	"I Am a Gentleman / Mig's Story"		3:39
14.	"Banishment"		3:08
15.	"In The Dungeon"		1:02
16.	"Cat and Mouse"		2:03
17.	"Roscuro and Despereaux"		2:11
18.	"Mig Steals the Crown"		1:20
19.	"Roscuro's Apology"		3:45
20.	"Gregory Gives Mig Away"		1:02
21.	"The Quest"		3:56
22.	"Despereaux Is Back"		3:15
23.	"Boldo and Despereaux Charge!"		1:39
24.	"A Change of Heart"		2:14
25.	"Rescuing the Princess"		3:07
26.	"Epilogue"		2:43
Total length:			59:04

== Release ==
The Tale of Despereaux premiered at ArcLight Hollywood on December 7, 2008, and was theatrically released December 19, 2008, in the United States and the United Kingdom by Universal Pictures. In the United States, the film received a rating of G for "general audiences" by the Motion Picture Association of America, whereas in the United Kingdom, it received a certificate of U by the British Board of Film Classification.

=== Home media ===
The film was released on DVD and Blu-ray April 7, 2009. One Blu-ray release also includes a standard-definition DVD of the film, in addition to the Blu-ray disc. The film brought in a revenue of $25,531,805 in the United States DVD market.

== Reception ==
=== Critical response ===
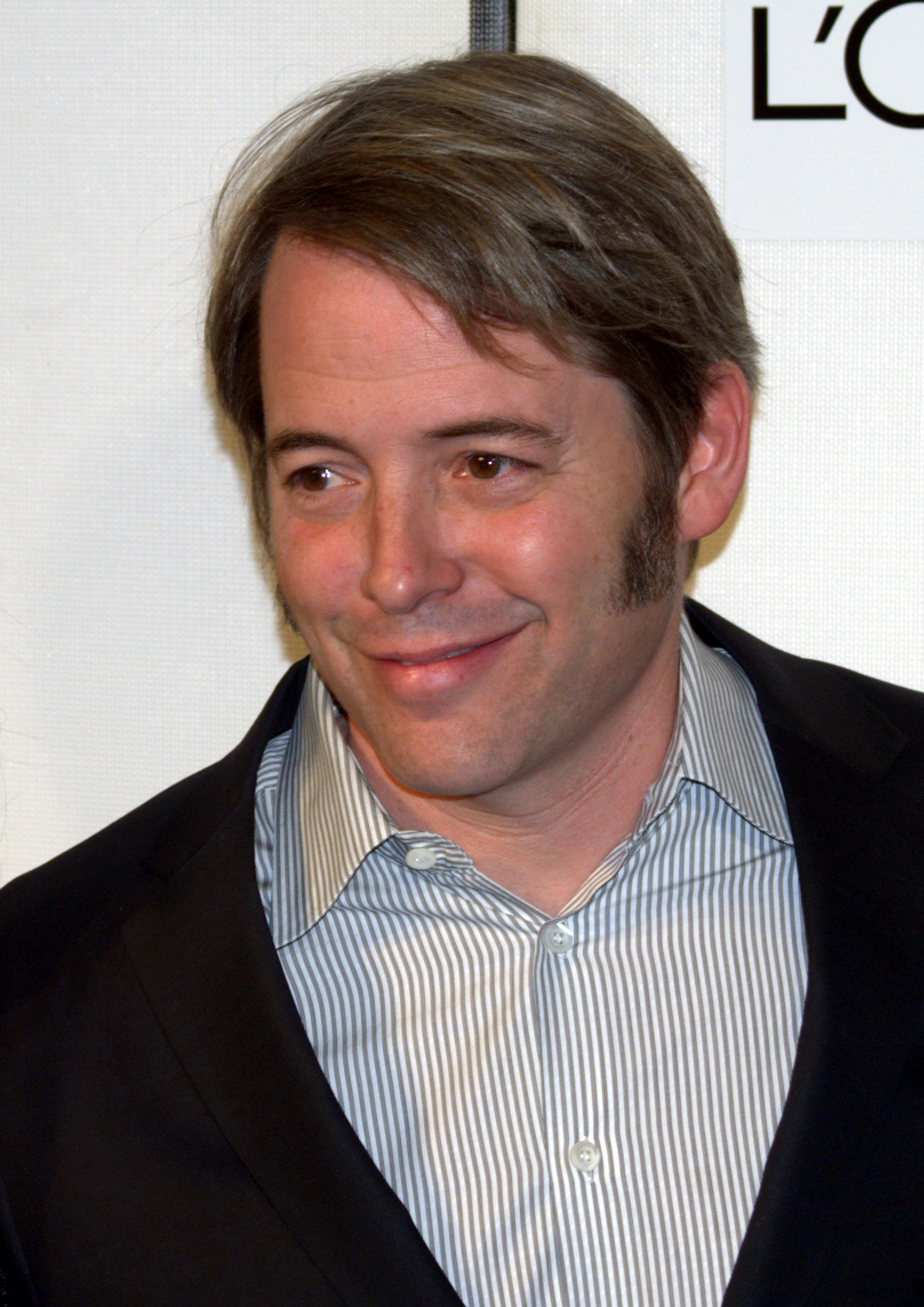
Matthew Broderick was praised for his performance in the film.

On the review aggregator website Rotten Tomatoes, 57% of 112 critics' reviews are positive, with an average rating of 5.7/10. The website's consensus reads: "Despite its striking visuals, The Tale of Despereaux as a story feels familiar and unimaginative." Metacritic, which uses a weighted average, assigned the film a score of 53 out of 100, based on 25 critics, indicating "mixed or average" reviews. Audiences polled by CinemaScore gave the film an average grade of "B" on a scale of A+ to F.

Roger Ebert of the Chicago Sun-Times awarded three stars, and wrote in his review, "The Tale of Despereaux is one of the most beautifully drawn animated films I've seen," but added, "I am not quite so thrilled by the story."

Christy Lemire of Associated Press was more critical, writing that the film "feels obvious, preachy and heavy-handed".

=== Box office ===
The Tale of Despereaux grossed $50.9 million in the United States and Canada, and $39.6 million in other territories, for a worldwide total of $90.5 million. Produced on a budget of $60 million, the film was a box-office disappointment.

The film opened in the United States on December 19, 2008. The film grossed $3.5 million on its first day, in 3,104 theaters, with an average of $1,140 per theater; it grossed $10.1 million in its opening weekend, ranking at third behind Seven Pounds and Yes Man. It grossed $8.1 million in its first week, dropping to tenth place behind Four Christmases for a decline of -20%, though would soon make $8.9 million in its second weekend, ranking at seventh behind Seven Pounds, declining by 12% compared to its first weekend. The film closed on March 5, 2009, with a domestic total of $50.9 million.

=== Awards ===
Award	Category	Nominee	Result	Ref(s)
Annie Awards 2009	Best Directing in an Animated Feature Production	Rob Stevenhagen, Sam Fell	Nominated	
Annie Awards 2009	Best Music in an Animated Feature Production	William Ross	Nominated	
Annie Awards 2009	Best Production Design in an Animated Feature Production	Evgeni Tomov	Nominated	
Annie Awards 2009	Best Storyboarding in an Animated Feature Production	Rob Stevenhagen	Nominated	
Casting Society of America, USA 2009	Outstanding Achievement in Casting – Animation Feature	Debra Zane	Nominated	
Chicago Film Critics Association Awards 2008	CFCA Award	Best Animated Feature	Nominated	
Motion Picture Sound Editors, USA 2009, Golden Reel Award	Best Sound Editing – Sound Effects, Foley, Music, Dialogue and ADR Animation in a Feature Film	Lon Bender (supervising sound editor), Chris Jargo (supervising dialogue/ADR editor), Nancy MacLeod (supervising Foley editor), Jon Title (sound designer), Peter Myles (music editor), Michael Hertlein (dialogue/ADR editor), Anna MacKenzie (ADR editor), Michelle Pazer (ADR editor), Paul Aulicino (sound effects editor), James Moriana (Foley artist), Jeffrey Wilhoit (Foley artist) and Diane Marshall (Foley artist)	Nominated	
San Diego Film Critics Society Awards 2008	Special Award	Richard Jenkins For The Visitor, Step Brothers and Burn After Reading For the body of work in the last year.	Won	
Satellite Awards 2008	Special Award	Best Motion Picture, Animated or Mixed Media	Nominated	

== Video game ==
A video game based on the film was released December 2, 2008, for the PlayStation 2, Wii and Nintendo DS, and December 16, 2008, for Microsoft Windows. An Xbox 360 version was originally announced, but it was canceled. While the PlayStation 2, Wii and Microsoft Windows versions were an action-adventure game, the Nintendo DS version was a 2.5D side-scrolling platformer.
