= The Tale of Despereaux =

2003 children's fantasy book by Kate DiCamillo

- First edition of the book from 2003
- Author: Kate DiCamillo
- Illustrator: Timothy B. Ering
- Cover artist: Davis Right
- Language: English
- Genre: Children's fantasy novel
- Publisher: Candlewick Press
- Publication date: August 25, 2003
- Publication place: United States
- Media type: Print (slick back)
- Pages: 276
- ISBN: 0-7636-1722-9
- OCLC: 50693525
- LC Class: PZ8.D525 Tal 2003

The Tale of Despereaux (/ˈdɛspəroʊ/ DESP-ər-oh) is a 2003 children's fantasy novel by American author Kate DiCamillo. The main plot follows the adventures of a mouse named Despereaux Tilling, as he sets out on his quest to save a captured human princess from the villainous rats. The book won the 2004 Newbery Medal award and has been adapted into a film and a video game loosely based on the book, as well as a stage musical.

== Accolades ==
In 2007 the U.S. National Education Association listed the book as one of its "Teachers' Top 100 Books for Children", based on an online poll. Teachers also made it a summer reading project. In 2012 it was ranked number 51 among all-time children's novels in a survey published by School Library Journal—the second of three books by DiCamillo in the Top 100.

== Plot ==
=== Book I: A Mouse Is Born ===
A small, sickly mouse named Despereaux Tilling is born in a castle with his eyes open (most mice are born blind). Despereaux, unlike other mice, spends much time reading, and particularly enjoys a book about a knight saving a princess and living happily ever after. One day, while reading, he hears music and follows the sound, which leads him to Princess Pea and King Philip. He sits at the king's feet to hear the music; infatuated with the princess, he speaks to her, although it is forbidden for mice to speak to humans. Because mice are related to rats, who were outlawed some years ago, the king outs Despereaux. Furlough, Despereaux's brother, sees this, and informs their father, Lester. Lester calls the mouse council as Furlough goes to collect Despereaux. The mouse council orders Despereaux to be sent to the dungeon to die. When Despereaux goes into the dungeon, he meets Gregory, the jailer, who saves him because Despereaux tells him a nice story.

=== Book II: Chiaroscuro ===
Book II features the prequel story of a rat named Chiaroscuro, who loved the light and was less vicious and cunning than other rats. After taking a red tablecloth from a prisoner who confessed that he traded his own daughter for it and didn't look back at her when he left her, Roscuro decided to go into the light against the wishes of his friend, Botticelli Remorso. He climbed onto a chandelier above a banquet and fell into the queen's soup, causing her to die of sheer fright. The princess ordered Roscuro to leave, whereupon he swore revenge against her. The king, distraught by the death of his wife, subsequently banned the use of spoons, soup, bowls, and rats, while Roscuro fled back to the dungeons.

=== Book III: The Tale of Miggery Sow ===
Many years before Despereaux and Roscuro were born, a six-year-old girl named Miggery "Mig" Sow witnesses the death of her ill mother. Afterward, Mig is sold to work by her father for some cigarettes, a hen, and a red tablecloth to a man Mig calls Uncle. Uncle often clouts Mig's ears, leaving her partially deaf. Upon seeing the princess pass by on a horse, Mig realizes that she wants to be a princess. Mig is then sent to work in the castle by the King's soldiers, who tell Uncle that no human being is allowed to own another. In the castle, she gains a significant amount of weight, only her head remaining small. Mig's main job is to go down to the dungeons to deliver Gregory the jailer his meals; while there, she meets Roscuro and confesses to him her wish to become a princess. Gregory gives her a handkerchief, Despereaux in it, and returns to the castle. Roscuro convinces Mig that if she helps him kidnap Princess Pea, he will make Pea a servant girl so Mig can become a princess.

=== Book IV: Recalled to the Light ===
Despereaux escapes the dungeons on a tray of Gregory's that Mig brings back to the kitchen, where he hears her conversation with Roscuro. However, Despereaux is soon discovered by Mig and Cook. Cook orders Mig to kill Despereaux. When Despereaux is attempting to flee, Mig chops off his tail with a knife. Despereaux spends the night in pain, sleeping on a sack of flour. Beginning to doubt the existence of a "happily ever after," Despereaux starts to weep. Meanwhile, Roscuro leads Mig to Princess Pea's room with a knife in one hand and a candle in the other to lead Princess Pea to the dungeon.

The next morning, the castle is in a panic over the captured princess. Guards are sent to search the dungeon, only to find Gregory dead from terror, lost in the dark mazes because Roscuro had chewed through the rope securing him to the dungeon entrance. Despereaux is seen by the mouse council, who mistake him for a ghost because he is covered in flour. Despereaux forgives his father for sentencing him to the dungeon, before mocking the rest of the council. Despereaux goes on to see the King. Despereaux tells the King that Pea is in the dungeon, but the King refuses to believe him because Despereaux is distantly related to the rats.

Despereaux then goes to Hovis, the thread master. Hovis gives him an entire spool of red thread and a sewing needle to serve as a sword for his quest to the dungeons. On his way, he runs into Cook, who has grown so anxious from Pea's disappearance that she has resorted to breaking the law and making soup. Instead of attacking Despereaux, she offers him some soup before seeing him off. Arriving at the dungeon, Despereaux loses the spool of thread when it leaves him at the top of the stairs. The spool of thread rolls to Botticelli Remorso, who smells soup, tears, flour, oil, and the blood of a mouse. Botticelli tricks Despereaux into thinking that he wants to help him save Princess Pea by leading him directly to her. Despereaux trusts Botticelli and follows him to the princess. Other rats start following as well when they smell Despereaux and the soup he recently ate. Mig, meanwhile, learns that Roscuro tricked her into helping him kidnap Pea and that she will never be a princess. Roscuro plans for Pea to remain locked in the dungeons so that he can marvel over her brightly colored dress, but Despereaux arrives to save Pea, and Mig chops Roscuro's tail off. Despereaux threatens to kill Roscuro with the sewing needle, but Botticelli taunts him for believing a mouse is capable of killing a rat. Roscuro, catching a whiff of the soup left on Despereaux's whiskers, realizes he does not truly want to hurt anyone and begins crying. Pea offers to treat Roscuro to soup if he frees her, to which Roscuro agrees. Botticelli, disgusted by the show of forgiveness and friendship between the two, returns to the darkness with the other rats.

Despereaux and Pea become close friends. Roscuro is allowed access to the upstairs of the castle, and reunites Mig with her father, a prisoner in the dungeons, who promises that he loves her and will never leave her again. Roscuro, Mig, the King, Pea, and Despereaux all get together for soup, as his parents, brother, and friends watch in amazement behind the scenes.

== Adaptations ==
=== Film ===
In 2008, the book was loosely adapted as an animated film of the same name.

=== Video game ===
On December 2, 2008, a video game for the Nintendo DS, Wii, and PlayStation 2 of the same name based on the film was released. On December 16, 2008, the game was also released for PC.

=== Stage musical ===
In 2018, the book was adapted into a musical by the PigPen Theatre Co.

== See also ==
- Ralph S. Mouse
- Reepicheep
- Stuart Little

== Sources ==
- Griswold, Jerry, "'The Tale of Despereaux': A World Without sad Soup", The New York Times, 16 November 2003

Awards
Preceded by Crispin: The Cross of Lead	Newbery Medal recipient 2004	Succeeded by Kira-Kira
