= Jack Swanson =

American operatic tenor, born 1992

Jack Swanson (born March 29, 1992) is an American operatic tenor with a high lyric voice, who specializes in bel canto roles in operas by composers such as Rossini and Donizetti. He has appeared at major international opera houses, including New York's Metropolitan Opera, the Vienna State Opera, the Hamburg State Opera, and Lyric Opera of Chicago.

== Early life and training ==
Swanson was born on March 29, 1992, in Stillwater, Minnesota. He graduated from Stillwater Area High School in 2010.

He obtained a Bachelor of Music in vocal performance from the University of Oklahoma in 2014. While an undergraduate, he participated in the summer vocal training program (2012 and 2013) of the Seagle Music Colony, performing Tobias Ragg in Sondheim's Sweeney Todd and the title role in Benjamin Britten's Albert Herring. As a student of Linda Esther Gray, he won first prize in the undergraduate art song category of the Hal Leonard Vocal Competition in 2014.

He continued his studies at the Shepherd School of Music at Rice University, receiving a Master of Music in May 2016. At Rice he sang Almaviva in Rossini's Il barbiere di Siviglia and Eurimaco in Monteverdi's Il ritorno d'Ulisse in patria. He spent two summers in the Santa Fe Opera apprentice program, during which he performed the Stage Manager in Mozart's The Impressario and a Japanese Envoy in Stravinsky's Le Rossignol in 2014 and A Peasant in Donizetti's The Daughter of the Regiment in 2015. He also won first place in the Scholarship Division of the 2015 National Opera Association Vocal Competition.

== Career ==
Swanson made his major stage debut in the 2015–2016 season with the Des Moines Metro Opera as Fenton in Verdi's Falstaff. He also sang with Opera Fort Collins as Ramiro in Rossini's La Cenerentola.

In the 2016–2017 season he appeared with Winter Opera Saint Louis as Camille in Lehar's The Merry Widow, with Opera Memphis as Frederic in Gilbert and Sullivan's The Pirates of Penzance, with Opera Delaware as Ramiro in La Cenerentola, and with England's Garsington Opera as Albazar in Rossini's Il turco in Italia. Concert appearances included Handel's Messiah with the Indianapolis Symphony Orchestra, Bruckner's Te Deum with the Houston Symphony Orchestra, and Mozart's Requiem with the Oregon Symphony Orchestra.

In October and November of 2017 he appeared as Almaviva in Rossini's Il barbiere di Siviglia on the Glyndebourne Tour, his debut with the company.

In January 2018, he first sang the title role of Leonard Bernstein's Candide in his debut with the Los Angeles Opera. James Conlon conducted, and Erin Morley sang Cunegonde. Swanson has gone on to sing the role on stage for the Atlanta Opera, and in concert at Opéra de Marseille, the Théâtre des Champs-Élysées in Paris, and the Lausitz Festival with the Hamburg Symphony.

In July of 2018 Swanson made his main-stage debut with the Santa Fe Opera in the role of Lindoro in Rossini's The Italian Girl in Algiers. Arya Roshanian, writing in the British magazine Opera, noted "newcomer Jack Swanson sang Lindoro's unrelenting music with apparent ease and is surely a name to watch in this repertoire."

During the 2018–2019 season, Swanson made his house debut with the Norwegian Opera as Nemorino in Donizetti's L'elisir d'amore (November–January), his Latin American debut at Theatro Municipal de São Paulo as Almaviva in Il barbiere di Siviglia (February), his role and house debut at Palm Beach Opera as Alfred in Offenbach's Die Fledermaus (March), his role and house debut at the Cologne Opera as Sam Kaplan in Kurt Weill's Street Scene (May), and his house debut with the Portland Opera as Almaviva in Il barbiere di Siviglia (June).

In July 2019 he performed Young Bastianello in John Musto's one-act comic opera Bastianello at the Festival Napa Valley.

During the 2019–2020 season, he sang Rodrigo in Rossini's Otello at the Frankfurt Opera (September–October), the tenor solos in Rossini's Messa di Gloria at La Seine Musicale (November), as tenor soloist with the American Symphony Orchestra at Alice Tully Hall in New York in a concert entitled "Sons of Bach" (December), (Note: Swanson sang the tenor parts in Wilhelm Friedemann Bach's cantata Erzittert und fallet and Carl Philipp Emanuel Bach's Magnificat. The conductor was Leon Botstein.) his role debut as Belmonte in Mozart's The Abduction from the Seraglio with Opera Omaha at the Orpheum Theatre (February). Canceled due to the Covid-19 pandemic were engagements to sing the title role in the world premiere of Paola Prestini's opera Edward Tulane at the Minnesota Opera (March), Cody in Philidor's The Blacksmith with Opera Lafayette (May), and Almaviva in Il barbiere di Siviglia at the Santa Fe Opera (summer 2020).

The early part of the 2020–2021 season was largely cancelled due to the Covid-19 pandemic. It was to have included a recital at the Frankfurt Opera (October 6) and engagements with the Norwegian Opera as Almaviva in Il barbiere di siviglia (November–January), Houston Grand Opera as Don Ramiro in La Cenerentola (January–February), and the Minnesota Opera in the same role (March–April). Swanson did sing in a Houston Grand Opera digital recital on March 12 with pianist Richard Bado, which was part of the "Live from the Cullen" series and later made available for streaming on Marquee TV. Further performances resumed in early April, when he sang as tenor soloist in Rossini's Stabat Mater with conductor Myung-Whun Chung and the Accademia Nazionale di Santa Cecilia in Rome. He then appeared with the Cologne Opera as Almaviva in Il barbiere di Siviglia (May) and with Garsington Opera in his debut in the title role of Rossini's Le comte Ory (May–July) and as The Italian Singer in Richard Strauss's Der Rosenkavalier (June–July).

On August 10, 2021, he made his debut at the Rossini Opera Festival in Pesaro, Italy, as Florville in Rossini's one-act comic opera Il signor Bruschino. He also gave a recital with piano accompaniment at the festival on August 17 at the Teatro Rossini, and sang in the festival's Rossini Gala on August 22. (Note: Swanson was a member of two ensembles who sang excerpts from Rossini's Ermione (Aria di Pirro, "Balena in man del figlio") and Guillaume Tell (Act 4 finale). The gala was presented outdoors in the Piazza del Popolo in the center of the old city.)

On December 4, 2021, he gave a recital as part of the Beirut Chants festival in Lebanon and in the latter part of December, made his role debut as Tamino in Mozart's Die Zauberflöte with Opéra national de Lorraine. From January to March, 2022, he sang for the first time Ferrando in Mozart's Così fan tutte with the Frankfurt Opera, and in April and May, repeated the role with Opéra national du Rhin. That summer he sang Almaviva with the Santa Fe Opera.

In August 2024 he appeared as Almaviva at the Rossini Opera Festival in a production that was presented in the large Vitrifrigo Arena. George Hall, writing in Opera, noted his voice was a bit light for such a large venue. Laura Servidei of Bachtrack, while agreeing that Swanson's "light, high tenor ... at times seemed weak for the role", also noted that his performance of the often-cut final rondo, 'Cessa di più resistere', was "remarkable".

He made his Metropolitan Opera debut on May 16, 2025, as Almaviva in Rossini's Il barbiere di Siviglia. The performance of May 31 was telecast internationally as part of the Metropolitan Opera Live in HD series.

== Personal life ==
Swanson is married to soprano Katherine Henly, whom he met at LA Opera during a production of Candide. They have a son (born November 2024) and live in Twin Cities, Minnesota.
