= Lidiya Yankovskaya =

Russian-American conductor (born 1986)

- Лидия Янковская
- Born: March 26, 1986 (age 40)
- Occupation: Conductor
- Website: www.lidiyayankovskaya.com

Lidiya Yankovskaya (Russian: Лидия Янковская; Russian pronunciation: [ˈlʲidʲijɐ janˈkofskajɐ]; born 26 March 1986) is a Russian-American opera and symphonic conductor and the former music director of Chicago Opera Theater.

== Biography ==
=== Early life ===
Born in Saint Petersburg. Yankovskaya studied ballet between the ages of three and five. She studied music from the age of five, playing piano and singing in the Saint Petersburg Children’s Choir of Radio and Television. She attended performances with her mother regularly, citing a production of Prokofiev's The Love for Three Oranges at the Mariinsky Theater as one of her first experiences with opera.

Due to the anti-Semitic climate in Russia, Yankovskaya immigrated to the United States with her mother at the age of nine. They settled in upstate New York, where Yankovskaya attended Hebrew day school.

=== Educational background ===
Yankovskaya's mother prioritized her musical development, enrolling her daughter at Guilderland High School in Albany, NY. Yankovskaya also joined the selective private teaching studio of piano duo Vladimir Pleshakov and Elena Winther, and began studying the violin. At 17, she won the school's concerto competition for a performance of Mozart’s Piano Concerto No. 12 (K. 414). During rehearsals, conductor Jeff Herchenroder suggested that Yankovskaya try leading from the piano. She later made her conducting debut at Herchenroder's request, leading the orchestra for the third movement of Dvořák's Symphony No.7 in D minor.

After graduation, Yankovskaya attended Vassar College, where she studied piano, voice, and conducting. She switched her focus from piano performance to conducting during her junior year. Yankovskaya led her own ensemble of approximately 55 instrumentalists and 30 singers in regular performances of contemporary works. Yankovskaya holds a master's degree in conducting from Boston University.

=== Career ===
Yankovskaya joined the Boston-based Juventas New Music Ensemble as an associate conductor and served as their music director between 2010-2017. Also taking on the role of artistic director in 2014, she sought to present collaborative, interdisciplinary works ranging from opera and ballet to puppetry, aerial dance, and robotic instruments.

Also in the Greater Boston area, she has served as the music director of Commonwealth Lyric Theater, music director of Lowell House Opera at Harvard University (2011-2015), and artistic director of the Boston New Music Festival. Yankovskaya has conducted the Boston Youth Symphony Orchestras Opera Chorus and prepared the Tanglewood Festival Chorus for programs with the Boston Symphony.

As a guest conductor, Yankovskaya has performed with the Washington National Opera, the Spoleto Festival USA, Symphony New Hampshire, Wolf Trap Opera, Stamford Symphony Orchestra, Opera Saratoga, Flagstaff Symphony Orchestra, the Brookline Symphony, Beth Morrison Projects, American Lyric Theater, and the Center for Contemporary Opera in New York City.

In 2015, Yankovskaya was one of six conductors selected to join the Dallas Opera's inaugural Hart Institute for Women Conductors and received honorable mention from Marin Alsop's Taki Concordia Conducting Fellowship.

Yankovskaya was appointed the music director of Chicago Opera Theater in June 2017 and began regular conducting duties with the 2018-19 season. She was the first female music director at Chicago Opera Theater. She stepped down as music director at the end of the company’s 2023-24 50th Anniversary season.

== Social and political involvement ==
During the Syrian refugee crisis, Yankovskaya started a grassroots performance ensemble that would become known as the Refugee Orchestra Project. The first performance by the ensemble took place on May 10, 2016 in Cambridge, MA. Growing interest on social media led to concerts in Boston, New York City, and Washington, DC. The orchestra joined the National Sawdust artists-in-residence for the 2017-18 season.

== Awards and honors ==
- 2018: U.S. representative at the World Opera Forum in Madrid
- 2018: Selected for the Bruno Walter National Conductor Preview, The League of American Orchestras
- 2018: National Opera Association, Best Opera Production for Rubinstein's The Demon with Commonwealth Lyric Theater
- 2017: Featured speaker, Opera America Conference in Dallas
- 2015: Participated in the Dallas Opera’s inaugural Hart Institute for Women Conductors
- 2015: Honorable Mention from Marin Alsop’s Taki Concordia Conducting Fellowship
- 2014: Winner of The American Prize in Opera Performance (Professional Division) for The Magic Mirror with Juventas New Music Ensemble
- 2014: Winner of The American Prize in Opera Performance (Community Division) for A Midsummer Night's Dream with Lowell House Opera
- 2014: Second Place in The American Prize in Conducting, Opera Division
- 2013: National Opera Association, Best Opera Production for Rachmaninoff's Aleko with Commonwealth Lyric Theater

== Recordings ==
- Caplan, Oliver. Illuminations. Juventas New Music Ensemble and Cleveland Contemporary Players. Oliver Caplan Music 5637904943, 2012. CD.
- Lane, Peter Van Zandt. HackPolitik. Juventas New Music Ensemble. Innova Recordings 892, 2014. CD.
