= Boston Globe–Horn Book Award =

Annual American literary award

- Awarded for: "excellence in literature for children and young adults"
- Location: Boston, Massachusetts
- Country: United States
- Presented by: The Horn Book Magazine
- First award: 1967
- Website: hbook.com/boston-globe-horn-book-awards

The Boston Globe–Horn Book Awards are a set of American literary awards conferred by The Boston Globe and The Horn Book Magazine annually from 1967. One book is recognized in each of three categories: Fiction and Poetry, Nonfiction, and Picture Book. The official website calls the awards "among the most prestigious honors in children's and young adult literature".

The Awards follow a school-year calendar. Taking the 2011–2012 cycle for illustration: books published June 2011 to May 2012 were eligible; submissions from publishers were accepted until May 15; the awards and honors were announced during June (when U.S. school years end), only one to twelve months after the eligible books were released.

From 1967 to 1975 there were only two award categories, fiction and picture book. The Nonfiction award was introduced in 1976 and the fiction category was revised to "Fiction and Poems" in 2001, when that award recognized Carver: A Life in Poems by Marilyn Nelson. There have been five "Special Citations": fourth awards conferred in five different years from 1977 to 1999.

Generally the books under consideration have been submitted by their publishers but the panel of judges may honor any eligible book. Before 2011–2012 the publishers were permitted to submit only a limited number of candidates.

== Winners ==
Boston Globe–Horn Book Award winners
Year	Category	Title	Writer	Illustrator	Ref.
1967	Fiction	The Little Fishes	Erik Christian Haugaard		
1967	Picture Book	London Bridge Is Falling Down	Peter Spier	Peter Spier	
1968	Fiction	The Spring Rider	John Lawson		
1968	Picture Book	Tikki Tikki Tembo	Arlene Mosel	Blair Lent	
1969	Fiction	A Wizard of Earthsea	Ursula K. Le Guin		
1969	Picture Book	The Adventures of Paddy Pork	John S. Goodall	John S. Goodall	
1970	Fiction	The Intruder	John Rowe Townsend		
1970	Picture Book	Hi, Cat!	Ezra Jack Keats	Ezra Jack Keats	
1971	Fiction	A Room Made of Windows	Eleanor Cameron		
1971	Picture Book	If I Built a Village . . .	Kazue Mizumura	Kazue Mizumura	
1972	Fiction	Tristan and Iseult	Rosemary Sutcliff		
1972	Picture Book	Mr. Gumpy's Outing	John Burningham	John Burningham	
1973	Fiction	The Dark Is Rising	Susan Cooper		
1973	Picture Book	King Stork	Howard Pyle	Trina Schart Hyman	
1974	Fiction	M. C. Higgins, the Great	Virginia Hamilton		
1974	Picture Book	Jambo Means Hello	Muriel Feelings	Tom Feelings	
1975	Fiction	Transport 7-41-R	T. Degens		
1975	Picture Book	Anno's Alphabet	Mitsumasa Anno	Mitsumasa Anno	
1976	Fiction	Unleaving	Jill Paton Walsh		
1976	Nonfiction	Voyaging to Cathay	Alfred Tamarin and Shirley Glubok		
1976	Picture Book	Thirteen	Remy Charlip	Jerry Joyner	
1977	Fiction	Child of the Owl	Laurence Yep		
1977	Nonfiction	Chance, Luck and Destiny	Peter Dickinson		
1977	Picture Book	Granfa' Grig Had a Pig	Wallace Tripp	Wallace Tripp	
1977	Special Citation	The Changing City and The Changing Countryside	Jorg Mueller		
1978	Fiction	The Westing Game	Ellen Raskin		
1978	Nonfiction	Mischling, Second Degree	Ilse Koehn		
1978	Picture Book	Anno's Journey	Mitsumasa Anno	Mitsumasa Anno	
1979	Fiction	Humbug Mountain	Sid Fleischman		
1979	Nonfiction	The Road from Home	David Kherdian		
1979	Picture Book	The Snowman	Raymond Briggs	Raymond Briggs	
1980	Fiction	Conrad's War	Andrew Davies		
1980	Nonfiction	Building: The Fight Against Gravity	Mario Salvadori	Saralinda Hooker and Christopher Ragus	
1980	Picture Book	The Garden of Abdul Gasazi	Chris Van Allsburg	Chris Van Allsburg	
1980	Special Citation	Graham Oakley's Magical Changes	Graham Oakley		
1981	Fiction	The Leaving	Lynn Hall		
1981	Nonfiction	The Weaver's Gift	Kathryn Lasky	Christopher G. Knight	
1981	Picture Book	Outside Over There	Maurice Sendak	Maurice Sendak	
1982	Fiction	Playing Beatie Bow	Ruth Park		
1982	Nonfiction	Upon the Head of the Goat	Aranka Siegal		
1982	Picture Book	A Visit to William Blake's Inn	Nancy Willard	Alice and Martin Provensen	
1983	Fiction	Sweet Whispers, Brother Rush	Virginia Hamilton		
1983	Nonfiction	Behind Barbed Wire	Daniel S. Davis		
1983	Picture Book	A Chair for My Mother	Vera B. Williams	Vera B. Williams	
1984	Fiction	A Little Fear	Patricia Wrightson		
1984	Nonfiction	The Double Life of Pocahontas	Jean Fritz	Ed Young	
1984	Picture Book	Jonah and the Great Fish	Warwick Hutton	Warwick Hutton	
1985	Fiction	The Moves Make the Man	Bruce Brooks		
1985	Nonfiction	Commodore Perry in the Land of the Shogun	Rhoda Blumberg		
1985	Picture Book	Mama Don't Allow	Thacher Hurd	Thacher Hurd	
1985	Special Citation	1,2,3	Tana Hoban	Tana Hoban	
1986	Fiction	In Summer Light	Zibby Oneal		
1986	Nonfiction	Auks, Rocks, and the Odd Dinosaur	Peggy Thomson		
1986	Picture Book	The Paper Crane	Molly Bang	Molly Bang	
1987	Fiction	Rabble Starkey	Lois Lowry		
1987	Nonfiction	The Pilgrims of Plimoth	Marcia Sewall		
1987	Picture Book	Mufaro's Beautiful Daughters	John Steptoe	John Steptoe	
1988	Fiction	The Friendship	Mildred D. Taylor	Max Ginsburg	
1988	Nonfiction	Anthony Burns: The Defeat and Triumph of a Fugitive Slave	Virginia Hamilton		
1988	Picture Book	The Boy of the Three-Year Nap	Dianne Snyder	Allen Say	
1989	Fiction	The Village by the Sea	Paula Fox		
1989	Nonfiction	The Way Things Work	David Macaulay	David Macaulay	
1989	Picture Book	Shy Charles	Rosemary Wells	Rosemary Wells	
1990	Fiction	Maniac Magee	Jerry Spinelli		
1990	Nonfiction	The Great Little Madison	Jean Fritz		
1990	Picture Book	Lon Po Po: A Red-Riding Hood Story from China	Ed Young	Ed Young	
1990	Special Citation	Valentine and Orson	Nancy Ekholm Burkert		
1991	Fiction	The True Confessions of Charlotte Doyle	Avi		
1991	Nonfiction	Appalachia: The Voices of Sleeping Birds	Cynthia Rylant	Barry Moser	
1991	Picture Book	The Tale of the Mandarin Ducks	Katherine Paterson	Leo and Diane Dillon	
1992	Fiction	Missing May	Cynthia Rylant		
1992	Nonfiction	Talking with Artists	Pat Cummings		
1992	Picture Book	Seven Blind Mice	Ed Young	Ed Young	
1993	Fiction	Ajeemah and His Son	James Berry		
1993	Nonfiction	Sojourner Truth: Ain't I a Woman?	Patricia C. McKissack and Frederick McKissack		
1993	Picture Book	The Fortune Tellers	Lloyd Alexander	Trina Schart Hyman	
1994	Fiction	Scooter	Vera B. Williams		
1994	Nonfiction	Eleanor Roosevelt: A Life of Discovery	Russell Freedman		
1994	Picture Book	Grandfather's Journey	Allen Say	Allen Say	
1995	Fiction	Some of the Kinder Planets	Tim Wynne-Jones		
1995	Nonfiction	Abigail Adams: Witness to a Revolution	Natalie S. Bober		
1995	Picture Book	John Henry	Julius Lester	Jerry Pinkney	
1996	Fiction	Poppy	Avi	Brian Floca	
1996	Nonfiction	Orphan Train Rider: One Boy’s True Story	Andrea Warren		
1996	Picture Book	In the Rain with Baby Duck	Amy Hest	Jill Barton	
1997	Fiction	The Friends	Kazumi Yumoto with Cathy Hirano (trans.)		
1997	Nonfiction	A Drop of Water: A Book of Science and Wonder	Walter Wick	Walter Wick	
1997	Picture Book	The Adventures of Sparrowboy	Brian Pinkney		
1998	Fiction	The Circuit: Stories from the Life of a Migrant Child	Francisco Jiménez		
1998	Nonfiction	Leon’s Story	Leon Walter Tillage	Susan L. Roth	
1998	Picture Book	And If the Moon Could Talk	Kate Banks	Georg Hallensleben	
1999	Fiction	Holes	Louis Sachar		
1999	Nonfiction	The Top of the World: Climbing Mount Everest	Steve Jenkins		
1999	Picture Book	Red-Eyed Tree Frog	Joy Cowley	Nic Bishop	
1999	Special Citation	Tibet: Through the Red Box	Peter Sís		
2000	Fiction	The Folk Keeper	Franny Billingsley		
2000	Nonfiction	Sir Walter Ralegh and the Quest for El Dorado	Marc Aronson		
2000	Picture Book	Henry Hikes to Fitchburg	D. B. Johnson	D. B. Johnson	
2001	Fiction and Poetry	Carver: A Life in Poems	Marilyn Nelson		
2001	Nonfiction	The Longitude Prize	Joan Dash	Dušan Petričić	
2001	Picture Book	Cold Feet	Cynthia DeFelice	Robert Andrew Parker	
2002	Fiction and Poetry	Lord of the Deep	Graham Salisbury		
2002	Nonfiction	This Land was Made for You and Me: The Life and Songs of Woody Guthrie	Elizabeth Partridge		
2002	Picture Book	“Let’s Get a Pup!” Said Kate	Bob Graham	Bob Graham	
2003	Fiction and Poetry	The Jamie and Angus Stories	Anne Fine	Penny Dale	
2003	Nonfiction	Fireboat: The Heroic Adventures of the John J. Harvey	Maira Kalman		
2003	Picture Book	Big Momma Makes the World	Phyllis Root	Helen Oxenbury	
2004	Fiction and Poetry	The Fire-Eaters	David Almond		
2004	Nonfiction	An American Plague: The True and Terrifying Story of the Yellow Fever Epidemic of 1793	Jim Murphy		
2004	Picture Book	The Man Who Walked Between the Towers	Mordicai Gerstein	Mordicai Gerstein	
2005	Fiction and Poetry	The Schwa Was Here	Neal Shusterman		
2005	Nonfiction	The Race to Save the Lord God Bird	Phillip Hoose		
2005	Picture Book	Traction Man Is Here!	Mini Grey	Mini Grey	
2006	Picture Book	Leaf Man	Lois Ehlert	Lois Ehlert	
2006	Fiction and Poetry	The Miraculous Journey of Edward Tulane	Kate DiCamillo	Bagram Ibatoulline	
2006	Nonfiction	If You Decide to Go to the Moon	Faith McNulty	Steven Kellogg	
2007	Picture Book	Dog and Bear: Two Friends, Three Stories	Laura Vaccaro Seeger	Laura Vaccaro Seeger	
2007	Fiction and Poetry	The Astonishing Life of Octavian Nothing, Traitor to the Nation, Volume 1: The Pox Party	M. T. Anderson		
2007	Nonfiction	The Strongest Man in the World: Louis Cyr	Nicolas Debon	Nicolas Debon	
2008	Picture Book	At Night	Jonathan Bean	Jonathan Bean	
2008	Fiction and Poetry	The Absolutely True Diary of a Part-Time Indian	Sherman Alexie	Ellen Forney	
2008	Nonfiction	The Wall: Growing Up Behind the Iron Curtain	Peter Sís	Peter Sís	
2009	Picture Book	Bubble Trouble	Margaret Mahy	Polly Dunbar	
2009	Fiction and Poetry	Nation	Terry Pratchett		
2009	Nonfiction	The Lincolns: A Scrapbook Look at Abraham and Mary	Candace Fleming		
2010	Picture Book	I Know Here	Laurel Croza	Matt James	
2010	Fiction and Poetry	When You Reach Me	Rebecca Stead		
2010	Nonfiction	Marching for Freedom: Walk Together, Children, and Don't You Grow Weary	Elizabeth Partridge		
2011	Picture Book	Pocketful of Posies: A Treasury of Nursery Rhymes	Salley Mavor	Salley Mavor	
2011	Fiction and Poetry	Blink & Caution	Tim Wynne-Jones		
2011	Nonfiction	The Notorious Benedict Arnold: A True Story of Adventure, Heroism, & Treachery	Steve Sheinkin		
2012	Picture Book	Extra Yarn	Mac Barnett	Jon Klassen	
2012	Fiction	No Crystal Stair: A Documentary Novel of the Life and Work of Lewis Michaux, Harlem Bookseller	Vaunda Micheaux Nelson	R. Gregory Christie	
2012	Nonfiction	Chuck Close: Face Book	Chuck Close with others	Chuck Close	
2013	Picture Book	Open This Little Book	Jesse Klausmeier	Suzy Lee	
2013	Picture Book	Building Our House	Jonathan Bean	Jonathan Bean	
2013	Fiction	Eleanor & Park	Rainbow Rowell		
2013	Nonfiction	Electric Ben: The Amazing Life and Times of Benjamin Franklin	Robert Byrd	Robert Byrd	
2014	Picture Book	Mr. Tiger Goes Wild	Peter Brown	Peter Brown	
2014	Fiction	Grasshopper Jungle	Andrew A. Smith		
2014	Nonfiction	The Port Chicago 50: Disaster, Mutiny, and the Fight for Civil Rights	Steve Sheinkin		
2015	Picture Book	The Farmer and the Clown	Marla Frazee		
2015	Fiction	Cartwheeling in Thunderstorms	Katherine Rundell		
2015	Nonfiction	The Family Romanov: Murder, Rebellion, and the Fall of Imperial Russia	Candace Fleming		
2016	Picture Book	Jazz Day: The Making of a Famous Photograph	Roxane Orgill		
2016	Fiction	The Lie Tree	Frances Hardinge		
2016	Nonfiction	Most Dangerous: Daniel Ellsberg and the Secret History of the Vietnam War	Steve Sheinkin		
2017	Picture Book	Freedom Over Me: Eleven Slaves, Their Lives and Dreams Brought to Life	Ashley Bryan	Ashley Bryan	
2017	Fiction	The Hate U Give	Angie Thomas		
2017	Nonfiction	Vincent and Theo: The Van Gogh Brothers	Deborah Heiligman		
2018	Picture Book	They Say Blue	Jillian Tamaki	Jillian Tamaki	
2018	Fiction and Poetry	The Poet X	Elizabeth Acevedo		
2018	Nonfiction	Photographic: The Life of Graciela Iturbide	Isabel Quintero	Zeke Peña	
2019	Picture Book	The Patchwork Bike	Maxine Beneba Clarke	Van T. Rudd	
2019	Fiction and Poetry	The Season of Styx Malone	Kekla Magoon		
2019	Nonfiction	This Promise of Change: One Girl's Story in the Fight for School Equality	Jo Ann Allen and Debbie Levy		
2020	Picture Book	Saturday	Oge Mora		
2020	Fiction and Poetry	King and the Dragonflies	Kacen Callender		
2020	Nonfiction	Infinite Hope	Ashley Bryan		
2021	Picture Book	I Talk Like a River	Jordan Scott	Sydney Smith	
2021	Fiction and Poetry	A Sitting in St. James	Rita Williams-Garcia		
2021	Nonfiction	From a Whisper to a Rallying Cry: The Killing of Vincent Chin and the Trial that Galvanized the Asian American Movement	Paula Yoo		
2022	Picture Book	Ain't Burned All the Bright	Jason Reynolds	Jason Griffin	
2022	Fiction and Poetry	All My Rage	Sabaa Tahir		
2022	Nonfiction	Black Birds in the Sky: The Story and Legacy of the 1921 Tulsa Race Massacre	Brandy Colbert		
2023	Picture Book	When You Can Swim	Jack Wong		
2023	Fiction and Poetry	Warrior Girl Unearthed	Angeline Boulley		
2023	Nonfiction	Sunshine	Jarrett J. Krosoczka		
2024 *This year saw slight category changes due to the Horn Book's centennial celebration	Picture Book	Do You Remember?	Sydney Smith	Sydney Smith	
2024 *This year saw slight category changes due to the Horn Book's centennial celebration	Poetry	Kin: Rooted in Hope	Carole Boston Weatherford	Jeffery Boston Weatherford	
2024 *This year saw slight category changes due to the Horn Book's centennial celebration	Nonfiction	The Mona Lisa Vanishes: A Legendary Painter, a Shocking Heist, and the Birth of a Global Celebrity	Nicholas Day	Brett Helquist	
2024 *This year saw slight category changes due to the Horn Book's centennial celebration	Fiction	Remember Us	Jacqueline Woodson		
2024 *This year saw slight category changes due to the Horn Book's centennial celebration	Special Citation	The New Brownies' Book: A love Letter to Black Families	Karida L. Brown and Charly Palmer		
2025	Picture Book	I Know How to Draw an Owl	Hilary Horder Hippely	Matt James	
2025	Fiction and Poetry	Everything We Never Had	Randy Ribay		
2025	Nonfiction	Death in the Jungle: Murder, Betrayal, and the Lost Dream of Jonestown	Candace Fleming		
2026	Picture Book	Navigating Night	Julie Leung	Angie Kang	
2026	Fiction and Poetry	A Scar like a River	Lisa Graff		
2026	Nonfiction	A World Without Summer: A Volcano Erupts, a Creature Awakens, and the Sun Goes Out	Nicholas Day	Yas Imamura	

== Repeat winners ==
Author Virginia Hamilton and illustrator Ed Young have both won three Awards, both in two categories. Steve Sheinkin and Candace Fleming have both won three Awards, all in the Nonfiction category.

Mitsumasa Anno, Avi, Nicholas Day, Jean Fritz, Cynthia Rylant, Allen Say, Sydney Smith, and Vera B. Williams have all won two Awards.

== See also ==
- Newbery Medal
- Caldecott Medal
