= Amnesty-Sís-Pinton Tapestries =

Memorial tapestries by Peter Sís and Ateliers Pinton

The Art for Amnesty-Sís-Atelier Pinton Tapestries are an ongoing collection of giant memorial tapestries designed by artist Peter Sís and created by French tapestry manufacturer Ateliers Pinton for Art for Amnesty, Amnesty International's global artist engagement program.

== Tapestries ==
Eleven Peter Sís-designed tapestries have been commissioned by Art for Amnesty founder Bill Shipsey.

=== Flying Man ===
The first tapestry, "The Flying Man" in honour of Czech dramatist, dissident and then President Václav Havel, was commissioned in 2012. Following Havel's death in December 2011 Shipsey's long time friend, Czech-born artist Peter Sís, created an illustration in memory of Havel for the front page of Czech newspaper Hospodářské noviny, commemorating Havel. Shortly thereafter an online campaign to name Prague Airport as the 'Vaclav Havel Airport' began. When this was successful, and the Czech Government decided to name the Airport in Havel's honour, Shipsey came up with the idea to transform Sís' image into a giant memorial tapestry for display at the airport.

This tapestry was funded by high-profile supporters of Amnesty International: musicians Bono, Edge, Peter Gabriel, Sting and Yoko Ono. The tapestries were hand-woven by Ateliers Pinton, the renowned tapestry weaving atelier in Felletin-Aubusson, France.

The resulting 4 by 5 metre tapestry depicts a striking image of a flock of white birds, in the shape of a man, set against a vivid blue background. Beneath him is the silhouette of Prague Castle and the Vltava river. One of the birds at the centre is shown carrying a red heart, a symbol Havel frequently used when signing his name.

Karel Schwarzenberg, Czech Foreign Minister at the time, and long time friend of Havel, praised the tapestry, saying, "Václav Havel would have been glad about it. Of course, he would have been even happier if he had heard that this wonderful gift in his memory was financed by co-artists—people of the same thinking and talent like him. I know how glad he was to meet any artist, be it from abroad or from the Czech Republic, who came to Prague and visited him. That was his life. They were his people."

The Flying Man tapestry currently hangs in Terminal 2 at Prague's Václav Havel Airport.

=== Out of the Marvellous ===
The second tapestry, Out of the Marvellous, was created in honour of Nobel Literature Laureate, Irish poet and long time Amnesty supporter Seamus Heaney. This tapestry, too, is themed around flight. It portrays Heaney flying over Ireland, using a giant book of his poetry as a parachute.

The name "Out of the Marvellous" comes from Heaney's poem "Lightenings viii". Lines from the poem are woven into the backdrop of the artwork. The tapestry took five months to be woven in Felletin, and measures 4 by 4.5 metres. It was unveiled by one of its patrons, singer Paul Simon, in April 2014, and hangs at Dublin Airport's T2.

Musician The Edge, another funder of the tapestry along with his bandmate Bono, said, "Seamus Heaney was an inspiration to our band—as well as to politicians, artists, dreamers and all in between, from every corner of the world. I love the idea that the words of this great poet—and Sís's beautiful tapestry—will send travellers from Ireland and beyond safely on their way 'out of the marvellous.'"

=== Yellow Submarine ===
In July 2015, a third monumental tapestry, in memory of musician and activist John Lennon and in gratitude for his wife Yoko Ono and her generosity to Amnesty International, was unveiled at the Ellis Island National Museum of Immigration in New York City harbour. It features Manhattan as a yellow submarine with a small John Lennon figure peeping out of the yellow submarine, flashing his famous peace sign. The tapestry is 7.3 metres wide and 3 metres high. It was paid for by Bono, Edge and Jimmy Iovine.

=== Flying Madiba ===
In December 2015, a fourth monumental tapestry, measuring 6 X 3 metres, was unveiled and dedicated at Cape Town International Airport. This artwork honours anti-apartheid leader and former South African President Nelson Mandela. It is titled Flying Madiba and was unveiled on December 10, 2015, International Human Rights Day. The tapestry, somewhat similar to Flying Man, depicts a figure flying over South Africa. This tapestry was funded by Bono, Edge, Sting, Peter Gabriel, and John Legend.

=== Flying Man ll ===
In July 2016 a fifth large tapestry, and a second honouring Vaclav Havel, was created by Pinton as a modified version of the original design by Sís. This tapestry was funded by Czech philanthropists and art patrons Karel Janecek and Libor Winkler. This tapestry is ultimately destined for the main meeting room of the Vaclav Havel Building of the European Parliament in Strasbourg when its renovation is completed in the spring of 2017. Meanwhile, the tapestry will tour and be displayed in the National Czech & Slovak Museum in Cedar Rapids, Iowa; at the Bohemian National Hall in New York City; and at DOX Centre for Contemporary Art in Prague. The dimensions of the tapestry are 3 metres long and 2 metres high.

=== Martin Luther King Tapestries ===
In November 2017 three Sís-designed Pinton tapestries honouring Martin Luther King Jr. and the civil rights movement in the U.S. were unveiled in the Civil Rights Institute in Birmingham Alabama, the National Civil Rights Museum in Memphis, Tennessee and the National Center for Civil and Human Rights in Atlanta, Georgia.

=== Hoopoe Tapestry ===
A small tapestry (two square metres) depicting the Hoopoe Bird was completed in July 2016. The tapestry was created in memory of Iranian lawyer and pro-democracy advocate Abdorrahman Boroumand, who was stabbed to death in the entrance to his apartment in Paris in 1991 by agents of the Islamic Republic of Iran.

== Peter Sís ==
Peter Sís is a highly awarded Czech-born American illustrator and children's books writer. He won the Hans Christian Andersen Medal in 2012 for his large legacy of children's book illustrations and is an eight-time winner of the New York Times Best Illustrated Book award.

He has also been awarded with the American Library Association's Caldecott Honor for the illustrations of his 1996 book, Starry Messenger, the 1998 book Tibet: Through the Red Box, and his 2007 work, The Wall: Growing Up Behind the Iron Curtain. The latter book also received the ALA's 2008 Sibert Medal for the most distinguished informational book for young readers. He has received a Boston Globe–Horn Book Award four times: for Komodo (1993), A Small Tall Tale From the Far Far North (1994), Tibet: Through the Red Box (1999), and The Wall: Growing Up Behind the Iron Curtain (2008).

He won the Deutscher Jugendliteraturpreis for Tibet: Through the Red Box.

Sís won the Golden Bear Award at the 1980 West Berlin Film Festival for an animated short. He also won the Grand Prix Toronto and the Cine Golden Eagle Award.

In 2012, when Flying Man was unveiled at Prague airport in memory of Havel, Sís explained his design to Radio Prague. He said, "You look at the sky, you see the flock of birds, you see somebody who can inspire you for one second, and then the birds fly in different directions and then the person is gone, like Václav Havel was gone… I grew up when he was active with Charter 77 and his Helsinki activities. At the same time, we thought we were into rock'n'roll and we thought we that were in opposition too. But only after all these years have I realised that we should have listened more, that he was amazingly brave and smart about what he was doing."

== Ateliers Pinton ==
Ateliers Pinton have created fine tapestries in Felletin-Aubusson, France since 1867. They use Basse-lisse looms that allow weavers create large-scale tapestries. All of Pinton's fibres and threads are dyed in-house; they have a collection of 10,000 shades of yarn. Each Pinton tapestry carries with it a signature "bolduc", a label describing the carpet or tapestry and its edition number. Pinton was responsible for weaving the original works of Léger, Miró, Calder, Delaunay and others, starting in the 1950s.
