= Brandy Colbert =

American author

- Born: Springfield, Missouri, U.S.
- Writing career
- Period: 2014–present
- Genres: young adult fiction, non-fiction
- Notable works: Pointe (2014); Life in Motion (Young Readers Edition) (2016); Little & Lion (2017); Finding Yvonne (2018); The Revolution of Birdie Randolph (2019); The Only Black Girls in Town (2020); Black Birds in the Sky (2021); The Blackwoods (2023)
- Notable awards: Stonewall Book Award (2018); Boston Globe–Horn Book Award (2022)
- Website: brandycolbert.com

Brandy Colbert is an American author of young adult fiction and nonfiction.

In 2018, her novel Little & Lion won the Stonewall Book Award for children's and young adult literature. In 2022, her nonfiction book Black Birds in the Sky won the Boston Globe–Horn Book Award for Nonfiction. Other notable books include Pointe (2014), the young readers edition of Life in Motion (2016), Finding Yvonne (2018), The Revolution of Birdie Randolph (2019), The Only Black Girls in Town (2020), and The Blackwoods (2023).

== Personal life ==
Colbert was born and raised in the Ozarks, in Springfield, Missouri, where she attended Glendale High School. The works of Dorothy West, Barthe DeClements, Jesmyn Ward, Colson Whitehead, and Zadie Smith were impactful to her writing career. She began working on what would be her debut novel, Pointe, in 2009, inspired by reports of long-term kidnapping cases. Colbert also teaches at the Hamline University’s MFA Program in Writing for Children and Young Adults.

== Selected works ==
=== Pointe (2014) ===
Colbert's debut young adult Pointe, following a teen dancer in suburban Chicago who has to come to terms with her dark past, was published in 2014 by Putnam.

A Chicago Tribune reviewer described the novel as "searing", and considered the main character "achingly believable", writing that she "inspires that level of connection" where "you long to reach into the pages ... and tell her, "No, you've got it all wrong". The book received a starred review from Publishers Weekly.

=== Little & Lion (2018) ===
Colbert's next young adult novel, Little & Lion, about a sixteen-year-old bisexual teen dealing with her brother's recent bipolar disorder diagnosis and her own sexuality, was published by Little, Brown in 2017. It received starred reviews from Booklist, Kirkus Reviews, the Bulletin of the Center for Children's Books, and School Library Journal.

Little & Lion also won the 2018 Stonewall Children’s and Young Adult Literature Award.

BuzzFeed and Tablet named Little & Lion one of the best young adult novels of 2017. Kirkus Reviews included it on their list of the year's best teen romance novels. Booklist also included it on their 2017 Editors' Choice: Books for Youth list.

In 2018, the American Library Association included it on their Best Fiction for Young Adults list, and Rainbow List.

=== Finding Yvonne (2018) ===
Colbert's third novel, Finding Yvonne, about a privileged teenager deciding what to do with her future when she unexpectedly becomes pregnant, was published by Little, Brown in 2018.

In 2018, the New York Public Library named Finding Yvonne one of the year's best books for teens. The following year, it was a CCBC Choices selection.

=== The Revolution of Birdie Randolph (2019) ===
Colbert's fourth novel, The Revolution of Birdie Randolph, a coming-of-age story about a 16-year-old girl, was published in 2019 by Little, Brown.

In 2019, the Chicago Public Library named The Revolution of Birdie Randolph one of the best young adult books of the year, and Booklist included it on their 2019 Booklist Editors' Choice: Books for Youth list. The following year, the American Library Association selected it for their Best Fiction for Young Adults list.

=== The Only Black Girls in Town (2020) ===
Colbert's first middle grade novel, The Only Black Girls in Town, about two black girls who find a mysterious journal in their attic, was published by Little, Brown in March 2020. Colbert says she found writing middle grade books intimidating, because she perceived writing for a younger audience as harder, and says that she wanted to write something that would've spoken to her as a kid. The initial idea for the novel came to her as she thought about what would happen if a character thought they were the only Black girl in town, but then another one moved in across the street. She cites Judy Blume and Beverly Clearly's books as influences for the novel.

The Only Black Girls in Town received starred reviews from Booklist, BookPage, Kirkus Reviews, Publishers Weekly, School Library Journal, and Shelf Awareness.

In 2021, the Association for Library and Information Science Education on their list of Notable Children's Books.

=== The Voting Booth (2020) ===
The Voting Booth, about two 18-year-olds on their first election day as registered voters, was published by Disney Hyperion in 2020 and reviewed in the New York Times.

In 2020, Booklist included The Voting Booth on their Booklist Editors' Choice: Books for Youth list, as well as their list of the top ten romance novels for youth. The following year, it was included on Young Adult Library Services Association's (YALSA) list of the best fiction for young adults.

=== Black Birds in the Sky (2021) ===
In 2021, Black Birds in the Sky: The Story and Legacy of the 1921 Tulsa Race Massacre was published by HarperCollins / Balzer + Bray.

In 2021, Booklist included Black Birds in the Sky on their Booklist Editors' Choice: Books for Youth list, as well as their 2022 list of the top ten history books for youth.

It won the 2022 Boston Globe–Horn Book Award for Nonfiction and was a finalist for the 2022 YALSA Excellence in Nonfiction for Young Adults Award.

=== The Blackwoods (2023) ===
The Blackwoods, the story of a Hollywood screen legend and her family, was published by HarperCollins / Balzer + Bray in 2023.

In 2023, Kirkus Reviews named The Blackwoods one of the best young adult books of the year.

== Awards and honors ==
Eight of Colbert's books are Junior Library Guild selections: Life in Motion: Young Readers Edition (2016), Little & Lion (2017), Finding Yvonne (2018), The Only Black Girls in Town (2020), The Revolution of Birdie Randolph (2020), The Voting Booth (2020), Black Birds in the Sky (2021), and The Blackwoods (2023).

Awards for Colbert's writing
Year	Title	Award	Result	Ref.
2018	Finding Yvonne	Earphones Award	Winner	
2018	Little & Lion	Stonewall Book Award	Winner	
2019	Finding Yvonne	Amelia Bloomer Book List	Selection	
2021	Black Birds in the Sky	Earphones Award	Winner	
2022	Black Birds in the Sky	Boston Globe–Horn Book Award for Nonfiction	Winner	
2022	Black Birds in the Sky	YALSA Award for Excellence in Nonfiction	Finalist	
2023	The Only Black Girls in Town	Rebecca Caudill Young Readers' Book Award	Nominee	

== Publications ==
=== Anthology contributions ===
- Perkins, Stephanie, ed. (2016). Summer Days and Summer Nights: Twelve Love Stories. St. Martin's Publishing Group. ISBN 9781250079121.
- Feral Youth. Simon Pulse. 2017. ISBN 9781481491112.
- Parker, Natalie C., ed. (2017). Three Sides of a Heart: Stories about Love Triangles. HarperCollins. ISBN 9780062424471.
- Reed, Amy, ed. (2018). Our Stories, Our Voices: 21 YA Authors Get Real About Injustice, Empowerment, and Growing Up Female in America. Simon Pulse. ISBN 9781534409019.
- Spotswood, Jessica; Sharpe, Tess, eds. (2018). "The Truth About Queenie". Toil & Trouble: 15 Tales of Women & Witchcraft. Harlequin Teen. ISBN 9781335016270.
- Zoboi, Ibi, ed. (2019). "Oreo". Black Enough: Stories of Being Young & Black in America. HarperCollins. ISBN 9780062698742.
- Foreshadow: A Serial YA Anthology of Short Stories. 2019.
- Silverman, Laura, ed. (2021). Up All Night: 13 Stories between Sunset and Sunrise. Algonquin Young Readers. ISBN 9781643750415.
- Fiffer, Steve, ed. (2022). The Moment: Changemakers on Why and How They Joined the Fight for Social Justice. University of Georgia Press. ISBN 9781588384751.

=== Non-fiction books ===
- Life in Motion: An Unlikely Ballerina Young Readers Edition. Co-written with Misty Copeland. Aladdin. 2016. ISBN 9781481479790.
- Black Birds in the Sky: The Story and Legacy of the 1921 Tulsa Race Massacre. Balzer + Bray. 2021. ISBN 9780063056664.
- The Rebellious Life of Mrs. Rosa Parks. Co-adapted with Jeanne Theoharis (Young Readers ed.). Beacon Press. 2021. ISBN 9780807067574.

=== Novels ===
- Pointe. Penguin Books. 2014. ISBN 9780399160349.
- Little & Lion. Little, Brown & Company. 2017. ISBN 9780316349000.
- Finding Yvonne. Little, Brown Books for Young Readers. 2018. ISBN 9780316349055.
- The Revolution of Birdie Randolph. Little, Brown Books for Young Readers. 2019. ISBN 9780316448567.
- The Only Black Girls in Town. Little, Brown Books for Young Readers. 2020.
- The Voting Booth. Disney Hyperion. 2020. ISBN 9781368053297.
- The Blackwoods. Balzer + Bray. 2023. ISBN 9780063091597.
