= Black Birds in the Sky =

2021 non-fiction book by Brandy Colbert

- Author: Brandy Colbert
- Publisher: Balzer + Bray
- Publication date: October 5, 2021
- Pages: 224
- Awards: Boston Globe–Horn Book Award (2022)
- ISBN: 9780063056664

Black Birds in the Sky: The Story and Legacy of the 1921 Tulsa Race Massacre is a 2021 non-fiction book by Brandy Colbert aimed at middle-grade and young adult readers that explores the 1921 Tulsa race massacre, as well as the historical context leading up to the event.

== Plot ==
Black Birds in the Sky recounts the story surrounding the Tulsa race massacre that took place between May 31 and June 1, 1921. The attack began after Dick Rowland, a 19-year-old Black man, allegedly assaulted Sarah Page, a 17-year-old white woman, resulting in a mob of white Tulsa residents seeking justice. The attackers, backed by government officials, burned and destroyed more than 35 square blocks of the neighborhood—at the time one of the wealthiest Black communities in the United States, colloquially known as "Black Wall Street".

Black Birds in the Sky not only discusses the events of the Tulsa race massacre but also explores the thriving community known as Black Wall Street, which was destroyed as a result of the massacre, as well as 100 years of history leading up to the event. Colbert provides context for the development of this community, including the impact of the United States government's forcible removal of Indigenous peoples, the rise of discriminatory laws, and Oklahoma's rise to statehood in 1907.

The book includes an foreword and afterword discussing the importance and relevance of knowing this history. Throughout, the text includes quotes from survivors, photographs, and newspaper headlines and articles.

== Reception ==
Black Birds in the Sky received starred reviews from Booklist, Kirkus Reviews, Publishers Weekly, School Library Journal, and Shelf Awareness.

Booklist's Melanie Marshall wrote, "This title offers a timely account for young adult readers. While it could have been written as a single, tragic event in an otherwise progressively trending nation, Colbert takes time and care to situate and contextualize the massacre as part of the longstanding history and legacy of racism in America." Marshall further noted that "readers are left with a vivid picture that will surely resonate with current events".

Kirkus Reviews called the book "a compelling recounting that invites and encourages readers to grapple with difficult history" They further noted that "the clear, readable prose supports a greater understanding both of how and why incidents like the one in Tulsa happened and their exclusion from curriculum and conversations about U.S. history."

Publishers Weekly referred to the writing as "compassionate but unflinching," and highlighted how "Colbert displays an impeccable grasp of the history of segregated Black towns and communities [...] and the powder keg of hatred and prejudice that would eventually condemn it".

Writing for Shelf Awareness, Natasha Harris highlighted how "thoroughly researched" Black Birds in the Sky is. Harris further added, "Colbert paints a clear picture of how and why this racial massacre occurred and encourages all readers, regardless of age or race, to confront the difficult and often obscured history of racial violence in the United States."

On behalf of School Library Journal, Allison Staley wrote, "Clear straightforward text, photos, and well-organized storytelling makes this an essential read for teens and adults alike."

The audiobook, narrated by Brandy Colbert and Kristyl Dawn Tift, also received a starred review from Booklist's Kaitlin Conner, who highlighted how Tift reads "with an air of grounded calm, her voice maintaining a gentle cadence, even as tensions escalate".

== Awards and honors ==
Black Birds in the Sky is a Junior Library Guild book.

In 2021, the audiobook received an Earphone Award from AudioFile. The same year, Booklist included the book on their Booklist Editors' Choice: Books for Youth list, as well as their 2022 list of the top ten history books for youth. In 2022, it won the Boston Globe–Horn Book Award for Nonfiction and was a finalist for the YALSA Award for Excellence in Nonfiction.
