= Jonathan Bean (illustrator) =

American children's book author and illustrator

- Born: 1979 (age 46–47)
- Education: Messiah University; School of Visual Arts
- Writing career
- Genre: Picture books
- Website: www.jonathanbean.com

Jonathan Bean (born 1979) is an American author and illustrator of children's books. He is best known for At Night and Building Our House, the winners of the Boston Globe–Horn Book Award for picture books in 2008 and 2013, respectively.

== Early life and education ==
Bean was born in 1979 and grew up near Fleetwood, Pennsylvania. His parents were part of the modern homesteading movement, and Bean grew up in a timber frame house his parents built over a five-year period. Bean (the second of four children) and his siblings were homeschooled. These experiences were lightly fictionalized in his autobiographical children's books Building Our House and This Is My House, This Is My School.

Bean graduated from Messiah University and received an MFA from the School of Visual Arts in New York City. He began his career as an illustrator for Cricket.

== Career as author and illustrator ==
In 2007, Bean published At Night, his first book as both author and illustrator. The story follows a girl lying awake in the evening in her Brooklyn home who goes up to the roof to look out at the city. Kirkus Reviews described it as "perfectly constructed and balanced" with "warmly composed pictures." The New York Times said the book was "as calming as a mug of warm milk," with praise for Bean's watercolor and ink illustrations. At Night won the 2008 Boston Globe–Horn Book Award for picture books.

Bean's illustrations for The Apple Pie that Papa Baked, written by Lauren Thompson, was recognized with the New Illustrator Award for 2008 by the Ezra Jack Keats Book Award program.

In 2013, Bean published the semi-autobiographical Building Our House, a book about a family relocating to the countryside to build a timber-frame home. Told in the fictionalized voice of Bean's older sister, the story encompasses the move away from the city and into a temporary trailer, followed by site preparation, framing, and finishing over the course of two winters, along with the birth of another child. Some elements of construction were modified to fit the story; for example, the construction of the Bean family's home took five years, not the one and a half depicted in the book. In The Horn Book, Betty Carter said the child narrator's voice presents a simplistic and exaggerated story belied by Bean's illustrations that show the difficulty of construction through adult eyes. In a survey of recent children's books on American themes, Rebecca Traister described Building Our House as "shot through with pioneer spirit" and "suffused with the cozy self-sufficiency of a Laura Ingalls Wilder tale." Building Our House was co-winner of the 2013 Boston Globe–Horn Book Award for picture books. It was also named a notable book of 2013 by The New York Times Book Review.

Bean followed Building Our House with Big Snow, also in 2013, about a Black child in New York City awaiting his first big snowstorm. The New York Times described the story as reinforcing "the consoling home life — portrayed in happy and straightforward watercolor pictures — that has become the signature of Bean’s work."

This Is My Home, This Is My School was Bean's next semi-autobiographical story. The story's narrator—a fictionalized version of Bean—guides readers on a tour through his house, the same house pictured in Building Our House, using different rooms to demonstrate how homeschoolers learn: flash cards in the living room, science experiments in the basement, cooking classes in the kitchen, collecting specimens in a stream and "recess" in the backyard. In the story, a "substitute teacher"—Bean's father—returns home at a certain point in the day to "teach" physical education. The New York Times noted that Bean's artwork displayed "characteristic ramshackle, loose-limbed charm, with bright watercolor brushstrokes straying exuberantly outside the pen-and-ink lines," which it called "reassuring . . . Bean is not presenting home schooling as an escape from the unruliness of reality, or as a bid for total control over everything in a child’s life." The Times reviewer added that the book made homeschooling "look like a potentially sane, enlightened alternative."

== Personal life ==
After living in Manhattan, Bean moved to Harrisburg, Pennsylvania, where he is an adjunct professor of illustration at Messiah University.

== Bibliography ==
=== As author and illustrator ===
- At Night. New York: Farrar, Straus and Giroux. 2007. ISBN 978-0374304461.
- Building Our House. New York: Farrar, Straus and Giroux. 2013. ISBN 978-0374380236.
- Big Snow. New York: Farrar, Straus and Giroux. 2013. ISBN 978-0374306960.
- This Is My Home, This Is My School. New York: Farrar, Straus and Giroux. 2015. ISBN 978-0374380205.
- New Home, New Friend. New York: Henry Holt. 2023. ISBN 978-0805081749.

=== As illustrator ===
- Emmy and the Rat trilogy by Lynne Jonell:
  - Emmy and the Incredible Shrinking Rat. New York: Henry Holt. 2007. ISBN 9780312384609.
  - Emmy and the Home for Troubled Girls. New York: Henry Holt. 2008. ISBN 9781741663280.
  - Emmy and the Rats in the Belfry. New York: Henry Holt. 2011. ISBN 9780805091830.
- Orr, Wendy (2007). Mokie and Bik. New York: Henry Holt. ISBN 978-0805079791.
- Thompson, Lauren (2007). The Apple Pie That Papa Baked. New York: Simon and Schuster. ISBN 978-1416912408.
- Orr, Wendy (2010). Mokie and Bik Go to Sea. New York: Henry Holt. ISBN 978-0805081749.
- Thompson, Lauren (2011). One Starry Night. New York: Simon and Schuster. ISBN 978-0689828515.
- Underwood, Deborah (2014). Bad Bye, Good Bye. New York: Clarion Books. ISBN 9780547928524.
- Hoefler, Kate (2016). Real Cowboys. New York: Clarion Books. ISBN 9780544148925.
