= Finding Yvonne =

2018 young adult novel by Brandy Colbert

- First edition cover
- Author: Brandy Colbert
- Publisher: Little, Brown Books for Young Readers
- Publication date: August 7, 2018
- Pages: 276
- ISBN: 9780316349055

Finding Yvonne is a 2018 young adult novel by Brandy Colbert. The novel is about a privileged teenager deciding what to do with her future as she chooses between various life paths in her future career, family, and romantic relationships.

== Plot ==
Finding Yvonne follows Yvonne, a high school senior living in Los Angeles who lives with her single father, a high-end chef. Although she has considered herself a violinist since her childhood, the identity is slipping away from her as she must choose between attending a music conservancy to become a professional musician or select an unknown career path. She also misses her mother, who left her family when Yvonne was young, and struggles to choose between two love interests.

== Reception ==
On behalf of School Library Journal, Francisca Goldsmith wrote that Finding Yvonne "seems underdeveloped" and "lack[s] the spark of energy of Little & Lion", which Colbert had published in 2017. Goldsmith explains, "The story is littered with only partially realized, and thus frustrating, symbolism and less-than-credible turns. By the end of the novel, readers will understand that Yvonne's father is depressed, but it takes a long time to get to that realization [...] The nuances of passing and racial erasure in the contemporary African American community is one area handled here with grace and cogency".

Conversely, Publishers Weekly argued that "Colbert [...] delivers another emotionally layered story". They indicated that "Yvonne’s character is steady and compelling" and that "Colbert shows a clear knack for secondary characters".

Deborah Stevenson, writing for The Bulletin of the Center for Children's Books, similarly highlighted how Colbert "credibly constructs a young Black woman negotiating complicated family dynamics" and called Yvonne "a compelling protagonist" who will "speak to readers thrown by the lack of certainty in their own futures".

Booklist also reviewed the novel.

== Awards and honors ==
Finding Yvonne is a Junior Library Guild book.

In 2018, the New York Public Library named Finding Yvonne one of the year's best books for teens, and the audiobook received an Earphone Award from AudioFile. The following year, it was a CCBC Choices and Amelia Bloomer Book List selection.
