= Pointe (Colbert novel) =

2014 young adult novel by Brandy Colbert

- First edition cover
- Author: Brandy Colbert
- Publisher: Penguin
- Publication date: April 10, 2014
- Pages: 352
- ISBN: 9780399160349

Pointe is a 2014 young adult novel by Brandy Colbert. It follows a teen dancer in suburban Chicago who has to come to terms with her dark past.

== Summary ==
Pointe follows Theo, a 17-year-old ballet dancer who lives in suburban Chicago and dreams of dancing professionally. As Theo is preparing for a high-stakes audition, her best friend, who had disappeared four years prior, returns. She learns that Theo's friends kidnapper was Theo's ex-boyfriend, an adult who had lied about his age to date her when she was 13. Throughout the novel, Theo struggles with anorexia and comes to terms with the realization that the relationship she thought was loving was actually more dangerous than she imagined.

== Background ==
Colbert began working on Pointe in 2009, inspired by reports of long-term kidnapping cases.

== Reception ==
Pointe received a starred review from Publishers Weekly, who called the novel "extraordinary ", noting that the book includes "honest, confident prose" and "characters whose flaws, struggles, and bad decisions make them real and indelibly memorable".

Christine Heppermann, writing for the Chicago Tribune, described the novel as "searing", and considered the main character "achingly believable", writing that she "inspires that level of connection" where "you long to reach into the pages ... and tell her, "No, you've got it all wrong".

On behalf of Booklist, Daniel Kraus called Pointe a "strong debut [that] believably portrays self-delusion through a first-person voice".

Jill Ratzan, writing for School Library Journal, highlighted how "Colbert bravely chooses realistic, if not necessarily happy resolutions to some subplots", including the resolution of Theo's former romantic relationship. Ratzan also noted, however, that "the abundance of high-interest motifs and devices (an unreliable narrator, statutory rape, kidnapping, eating disorders, and hints of the elite world of ballet) sometimes overloads the story, and the connections among them often feel forced".

Kirkus Reviews said the novel "ultimately misses the…point". They agreed that "Colbert does a commendable job creating authentic teen characters", but noted that "Theo’s struggles with anorexia are surprisingly and disappointingly lacking in emotion" and that "while there are flashbacks aplenty, there are surprisingly few that shed light on the deep connection Theo and Donovan presumably once shared".
