= The Blackwoods =

2023 young adult novel by Brandy Colbert

- Author: Brandy Colbert
- Publisher: Balzer + Bray
- Publication date: October 3, 2023
- ISBN: 9780063091597

The Blackwoods is a 2023 young adult novel by Brandy Colbert. The novel is told through three alternative perspectives, starting in 1942 with the rise of Hollywood film star Blossom Blackwood to the present day, following Blackwood's death and her family's subsequent grieving process and their relationship with Blossom's success, especially after a decades-long secret is revealed.

== Reception ==
The Blackwoods received starred reviews from Kirkus Reviews, Publishers Weekly, and Shelf Awareness.

Kirkus Reviews referred to The Blackwoods as "a striking testament to the bonds of family and a perceptive study in how events can echo throughout generations". They further praised how "Colbert expertly juggles each protagonist’s POV, rendering them with distinct tones and rhythmic prose that complements the characters’ individual situations". Publishers Weekly and Shelf Awareness's Natasha Harris shared the sentiment.

Kirkus Reviews, Publishers Weekly, and Shelf Awareness all also highlighted Colbert's strength in navigating difficult topics, including racism, sexual harassment, sexism, and addiction.

Booklist and School Library Journal also reviewed the novel.

== Awards and honors ==
The Blackwoods is a Junior Library Guild book. In 2023, Kirkus Reviews named The Blackwoods one of the best young adult books of the year.
