= Jonell (name) =

Jonell is a feminine given name and surname. Notable people with name include:

== Given name ==
- Jonell (born 1977), American singer
- JoNell Bakke, American politician
- JoNell Kennedy (born 1986), American actress and film producer
- Jonell Nash (1942–2015), American food editor

== Surname ==
- Anders Jonell (born 1973), Swedish freestyle skier
- Lynne Jonell (born 1956), American children's writer
