= Double Dog Dare =

Double Dog Dare may refer to:

- "Double Dog Dare", a 2002 episode of Teacher's Pet
- "Double Dog Dare", a 2012 episode of Judge John Hodgman
- Double Dog Dare, a 1988 children's book by Jamie Gilson
- Double Dog Dare, a 2012 children's book by Lisa Graff
- Double Dog Dare, a 2015 episode of Hudson & Rex

== See also ==
- Dare game, the game originating the term
- Doubledogdare (1953–1974), American Thoroughbred Champion racehorse
