= Sweethearts of Rhythm (picture book) =

Book by Marilyn Nelson

Sweethearts of Rhythm: The Story Of The Greatest All-Girl Swing Band In The World
- Author: Marilyn Nelson
- Illustrator: Jerry Pinkney
- Language: English
- Genre: Children's literature, picture book, American poetry
- Published: 2009 (Dial Press)
- Publication place: United States
- Media type: Print (hardback)
- Pages: 79
- ISBN: 9780803731875
- OCLC: 269282146
- Book designed by Lily Malcolm

Sweethearts of Rhythm is a 2009 book by Marilyn Nelson and illustrated by Jerry Pinkney, published by Dial Books for Young Readers. It is about various musical instruments in a pawnshop poetically reminiscing about the jazz band, International Sweethearts of Rhythm.

== Reception ==
The Horn Book Magazine, in a review of Sweethearts of Rhythm, wrote "Nelson's verbal evocations of the music and its players, and her wry asides .. re-create a wartime when the absence of men enabled these talented women to pursue their art. Pinkney does them proud in expansive wordless spreads between the poems plus full-page art facing each poem;".

Booklist', in a starred review, found "Words and pictures swinging together capture the Sweethearts in full cry." and School Library Journal wrote "Nelson's syncopated poetry jives perfectly with Pinkney's layered watercolors".

Sweethearts of Rhythm has also been reviewed by Publishers Weekly, Library Media Connection magazine, Voice of Youth Advocates, and Kirkus Reviews.

== Awards ==
- 2009 Publishers Weekly Best Children's Books
- 2010 ALA Notable Children's Book
- 2010 Notable Social Studies Trade Books For Young People—History/Life & Culture in the America
- 2010 Notable Book for a Global Society: Poetry
- 2010 YALSA Excellence in Nonfiction for Young Adults Award—nominated
- 2014 National Endowment for the Humanities Nonfiction Booklist for Young Readers: 9–13
