= The Bear and the Wildcat =

2008 children's book by Kazumi Yumoto

- Author: Kazumi Yumoto
- Original title: Kuma to yamaneko
- Translator: Cathy Hirano
- Illustrator: Komako Sakai
- Language: Japanese
- Genre: Children's literature
- Publisher: Kawade Shobō Shinsha (Japanese); Gecko Press (English)
- Publication date: 2008 (Japanese); 2011 (English)
- Publication place: Japan

The Bear and the Wildcat (Japanese: くまとやまねこ, Hepburn: Kuma to Yamaneko) is a children's picture book written by Kazumi Yumoto and with illustrations by Komako Sakai. Originally published in Japanese in 2008 by Kawade Shobō Shinsha, an English version was released in 2011 by Gecko Press, with a translation by Cathy Hirano. Focused on grief, the book tells the story of a bear who lost its friend and is told by the other animals to forget about them and move on.

== Reception ==
A review for Publishers Weekly praised Sakai's art calling it "elegant", and noted how it helped divide the book into two parts, using monochrome for the first section and adding color to the second half. The reviewer also praised the translation and the original writing, and concluded by calling the book "a touchstone for talking about loss." Writing for Reading Time, Amanda de Jongh said "[t]he pictures further the reader's understanding of grief", noting they help describe the feeling of depression the Bear felt at points.

Kirkus Reviews gave it a starred review and noted the drawings seemed like "relief paintings released from their claustrophobic borders". They also wrote The Bear and the Wildcat "is a book that will offer comfort to many." Connie Fletcher, who reviewed for The Booklist, called it a "touching story about grief", giving special attention to the art which, according to them, "carry the story". They conclude the review by calling Yumoto's story a "deeply somber but ultimately uplifting read."
