= George Shannon =

George Shannon may refer to:

- George Shannon (actor) (c. 1940), professor of gerontology
- George Shannon (explorer) (1785–1836), member of the Lewis and Clark Expedition
- George R. Shannon (1818–1891), member of the Texas Senate
- George Shannon (author), children's book author
