= The Revolution of Birdie Randolph =

2019 young adult novel by Brandy Colbert

- First edition book cover
- Author: Brandy Colbert
- Publisher: Little, Brown Books for Young Readers
- Publication date: August 20, 2019
- ISBN: 9780316448567

The Revolution of Birdie Randolph is a 2019 young adult novel by Brandy Colbert about a teenage girl who must learn to be her authentic self beyond her family's expectations.

== Plot ==
"The Revolution of Birdie Randolph follows Dove "Birdie" Randolph, a 16-year-old Black girl living in Chicago with her parents in an apartment above her mother's hair salon. While Birdie's sister, Mimi, is away at university, Birdie is adhering to a rigorous academic schedule. In addition to spending time with her best friend, Lazarus “Laz” Ramos, Birdie is secretly meeting with Booker Stratton, a boy her parents wouldn't approve of. The plot takes a turn when Birdie's enigmatic Aunt Carlene, who has struggled with addiction and spent significant time in rehab, moves into the apartment, introducing heightened tension within the family.

== Reception ==
The Revolution of Birdie Randolph received starred reviews from Booklist, Publishers Weekly, and Shelf Awareness.

Booklist's Enishia Davenport wrote, "Colbert’s latest novel brilliantly delves into first loves, forbidden romance, rebellion, and family expectations [...] Heavier topics like addiction, trauma, and the ills of juvenile justice system for teens of color are also explored in a refreshingly nuanced way that is handled with intelligence and care. With these topics, Colbert shows that there are two sides to every story and that the people enmeshed in these situations are often victims who need support rather than recrimination."

Kirkus Reviews agreed with Davenport that "the treatment of topics such as the impact of addiction, racial profiling and discrimination, and sexuality [...] is skillful and will resonate". They concluded that the novel is "moving and memorable".

Publishers Weekly conceded that the novel had "occasionally predictable plotting" but agreed with other reviewers regarding the novel's "unique cast of well-developed characters", as well as Colbert's skill "navigating responsibility, grief, racial profiling, and addiction".

Breanna J. McDaniel, writing for Shelf Awareness, praised the novel's "superb pacing and full-bodied development of queer and ethnically diverse central and supporting characters". McDaniel also highlighted the "unexpected, masterful plot twist and an extremely satisfying ending".

School Library Journal's Kristin Lee Anderson also reviewed the novel.

== Awards and honors ==
The Revolution of Birdie Randolph is a Junior Library Guild book.

In 2019, the Chicago Public Library named The Revolution of Birdie Randolph one of the best young adult books of the year, and Booklist included it on their Booklist Editors' Choice: Books for Youth list. The following year, the American Library Association selected it for their Best Fiction for Young Adults list.
