= The Voting Booth =

2020 young adult novel by Brandy Colbert

- Author: Brandy Colbert
- Audio read by: Robin Eller Cary Hite
- Genre: Young adult fiction
- Publisher: Disney Hyperion
- Publication date: July 7, 2020
- ISBN: 978-1-368-05329-7

The Voting Booth is a 2020 young adult novel by Brandy Colbert about two 18-year-olds on their first election day as registered voters.

== Plot ==
The Voting Booth centers the perspectives of two young adults, Marva Sheridan and Duke Crenshaw, who do not initially know one another. Marva, who is Black, spends her free time helping other register to vote and is excited for her first opportunity to vote, even after she learns that her white boyfriend, Alec, has decided not to vote as a protest against the two-party system. Duke, who is mixed race, feels the need to vote given his late brother Julian's political activism but is more excited about playing for his band's first paying gig. On the day of the election, Marva sees Duke turned away from the polling place. Marva's social justice instincts kick in, and the two make it their goal to help Duke discern his voter registration issues. Throughout the day, they "discuss race ..., privilege ..., and their different family dynamics", and turn from strangers to something more as "Duke falls hard for passionate, driven Marva, and she begins to appreciate his laid-back charm".

== Reception ==
The Voting Booth received starred reviews from Booklist, Kirkus Reviews, and Publishers Weekly.

On behalf of Shelf Awareness, Jaclyn Fulwood described The Voting Booth as a "sweet, politically minded YA romance".

According to Booklist's Maggie Reagan, the book's alternating perspectives allow Colbert to "warmly and appealingly [address] issues that many teens, especially those considering how their own first vote may play out, are facing". Publishers Weekly similarly highlighted how Colbert "aptly discusses matters of civil disobedience and social justice—including police brutality and voter suppression—without sacrificing the delicate, lighthearted relationship at the story’s center". Kirkus Reviews praised Colbert for how she "skillfully manages both serious and playful elements throughout the novel". Beyond the political element, Fulwood highlighted how "Colbert gently but thoroughly addresses the strain of grief, the relief of having someone to lean on and the importance of involvement even in an imperfect system". Writing for The New York Times, American young adult novelist Nicola Yoon noted that "in less skilled hands", the book's "premise could easily have become didactic", but found that "Colbert is deft at making the political feel truly personal".

Both Kirkus Reviews and Reagan found Marva and Duke to be well-developed and realistically portrayed. Yoon described Marva and Duke as "smart and highly opinionated, making for plenty of zippy and infectious dialogue". Kirkus also found that the "secondary characters add rich texture to and understanding of the primary characters", and that the novel's use first-person perspective for both characters gave "the novel an intimate feel".

School Library Journal's Talea Anderson also reviewed the novel.

Reviewing the audiobook narrated by Robin Eller and Cary Hite, AudioFile indicated that "Hite is especially convincing and appealing as Duke".

== Awards and honors ==
The Voting Booth novel and audiobook are both Junior Library Guild books.

In 2020, Booklist included The Voting Booth on their Booklist Editors' Choice: Books for Youth list, as well as their list of the top ten romance novels for youth. The following year, it was included on Young Adult Library Services Association's (YALSA) list of the best fiction for young adults.
