= The Only Black Girls in Town =

2020 young adult novel by Brandy Colbert

- First edition book cover
- Author: Brandy Colbert
- Publisher: Little, Brown Books for Young Readers
- Publication date: March 24, 2020
- Pages: 368
- ISBN: 9780316456388
- OCLC: 1100427215

The Only Black Girls in Town is a 2020 middle grade novel by Brandy Colbert about two Black middle schoolers who bond over their racial identity and find a mysterious journal in their attic.

== Background ==
Colbert says she found writing middle grade books intimidating, because she perceived writing for a younger audience as harder, and says that she wanted to write something that would've spoken to her as a kid. The initial idea for the novel came to her as she thought about what would happen if a character thought they were the only Black girl in town, but then another one moved in across the street. She cites Judy Blume's and Beverly Cleary's books as influences for the novel.

== Plot ==
The Only Black Girls in Town follows Alberta, a kind, 12-year-old girl who lives in the small town of Ewing Beach, California with her dads. Alberta is also the only Black girl in her school, which has led to a lot of bullying and microaggressions. One day, a new family moves in across the street, and Alberta meets Edie, a goth girl from Brooklyn. Although their personalities are quite different, they bond over being the only Black students in their small town, as well as the racism they face. However, their friendship begins to crack as Alberta's lifelong best friend begins hanging out with the popular girls who have taunted Alberta for years and Edie's parents go through a divorce. However, when they find a set of journals in Edie's home, they work together to uncover a mystery about a young Black woman who passed as white and lived in Ewing Beach in the 1950s.

== Reception ==
The Only Black Girls in Town received starred reviews from Booklist, BookPage, Kirkus Reviews, Publishers Weekly, School Library Journal, and Shelf Awareness.

Booklist's Shaunterria Owens called the novel a "remarkable middle-grade debut" and highlighted how "several events central to Black history [...] are introduced without the story becoming didactic, adding depth to a sweet story featuring children of color trying to find their place in a society that tells them they do not fit".

On behalf of BookPage, Heather Seggel similarly noted that "Colbert’s light touch with weighty subjects results in a novel that dives deep into the impacts of racism, particularly microagressions, with subtlety and nuance." Seggel also praised Colbert's writing, highlighting how "she creates characters readers will love spending time with and settings that reward exploration".

Kirkus Reviews and Publishers Weekly also praised the novel's characters, which Kirkus referred to as "classy" and "indelible" and Publishers Weekly called "imperfect" and vulnerable". Publishers Weekly further stated that "Colbert employs a compulsively readable style to convey the sometimes difficult experience of young friendship, and the power and peril of claiming one’s identity out loud".

School Library Journal's Desiree Thomas called the novel "nuanced" and highlighted how it "skillfully depicts the ways friendships can be shaped by common experience and racial proximity". On behalf of Shelf Awareness, Clarissa Hadge offered a similar sentiment, writing, "Colbert's well-articulated prose captures the difficulties of tween years without skirting around tough topics like racism, menstruation and bullying".

Like other reviewers, Deborah Stevenson, writing for The Bulletin of the Center for Children's Books, discussed how "Colbert capably combines a familiar tale of middle-school friendships under pressure with details about ongoing racial microaggressions". Stevenson additionally noted that "the implausibly literary diaries strain credulity", though conceded that "their themes tie in with present-day exploration of family relationships and explorations of identity". Stevenson concluded that the novel provides "an effective blend of easy accessibility and sharp perception".

== Awards and honors ==
The Only Black Girls in Town is a Junior Library Guild book.

In 2021, the Association for Library Service to Children included the novel on their list of Notable Children's Books. In 2023, it was nominated for the Rebecca Caudill Young Readers' Book Award.
