= Tibet Through the Red Box =

Play written by David Henry Hwang

- Original language: English
- Written by: David Henry Hwang
- Characters: The Boy Spirit; Vladimir; Peter; Alenka; Jingle-Bell Boy
- Subject: Family; Culture
- Genre: Drama
- Setting: Prague, Tibet, etc.

Premiere
- Date: January 30, 2004
- Place: Seattle Children's Theatre; Seattle, Washington

Tibet Through the Red Box is a 2004 theatrical adaptation of author Peter Sis' children's book of the same title by American playwright David Henry Hwang. It tells of a boy growing up in Prague into the 1950s. It was commissioned by the Seattle Children's Theatre, where it opened on January 30, 2004. It was directed by Francesca Zambello.

The script is published by Playscripts, Inc.
