= Upon the Head of the Goat =

1981 children's autobiography by Aranka Siegal

Upon the Head of the Goat: A Childhood in Hungary 1939–1944
- Author: Aranka Siegal
- Language: English
- Genre: Children's literature / Historical fiction
- Publisher: Farrar
- Publication date: 1981
- Publication place: United States

Upon the Head of the Goat: A Childhood in Hungary 1939–1944 is a 1981 children's memoir by Jewish author and Holocaust survivor Aranka Siegal. It follows the author as a young girl, Piri Davidowitz, (the name 'Piri' comes from the Yiddish name Siegal's grandmother used to call her by, 'Perele') a Hungarian Jew growing up during the Holocaust and Nazi Germany's occupation of Hungary. The title comes from the Book of Leviticus and the story of the scapegoat. The book earned a Newbery Honor in 1982. the title, Upon the Head of the Goat, comes from the Biblical passage, Leviticus 16, which Siegal came across while looking up the definition of "scapegoat".
