= Warwick Hutton =

English painter

Warwick Hutton (17 July 1939 – 28 September 1994) was a British painter, glass engraver, illustrator, and children's author.

He is most widely known for elegant pen and ink and watercolor illustrations for children's books. His subjects were Biblical, folk, and mythological stories which Hutton retold, such as Noah and the Great Flood, The Nose Tree, and Theseus and the Minotaur. He also worked with texts by Hans Christian Andersen (The Tinderbox) and with retellings of traditional stories by author Susan Cooper (The Silver Cow, The Selkie Girl, Tam Lin).

The Nose Tree and Jonah and the Big Fish were chosen for the New York Times's annual list of best-illustrated children's books. Jonah and the Great Fish was also the recipient of the 1984 Boston Globe-Horn Book Award for Best Picture Book.

Hutton died of cancer on 28 September 1994 in Cambridge, England. His parents were immigrants from New Zealand; his father was the artist and glass engraver John Hutton and his mother was also a modern artist, called Helen Blair.
