= Kazumi Yumoto =

Japanese novelist and screenwriter

Kazumi Yumoto (湯本 香樹実, Yumoto Kazumi, born November 11, 1959) is a Japanese screenwriter and novelist.

== Biography ==
Yumoto was born in Tokyo and graduated from Tokyo College of Music. She began writing scripts for opera and became a writer for television and radio. Her debut children's novel The Friends (1992) received the Newcomer Award from the Japan Children's Literature Association and the Boston Globe–Horn Book Awards in 1999. It was adapted to a movie in 1994, directed by Shinji Sōmai. Kishibe no Tabi (Journey to the Shore), another of her books, was adapted to a film; directed by Kiyoshi Kurosawa, it won the Un Certain Regard award at the 2015 Cannes Film Festival.

== Selected works ==
- 1992- The Friends (Summer Garden - The Friends (夏の庭 The Friends, Natsu no Niwa The Friends))
- 1995- The Spring Tone (The Spring Organ (春のオルガン, Haru no Orugan)
- 1997- The Letters (Autumn of Poplars (ポプラの秋, Popura no aki))
- 2008- The Bear and the Wildcat (くまとやまねこ, Kuma to Yamaneko)
- 2010- Kisishibe no Tabi (岸辺の旅)
