= Aranka Siegal =

American writer (1930–2026)

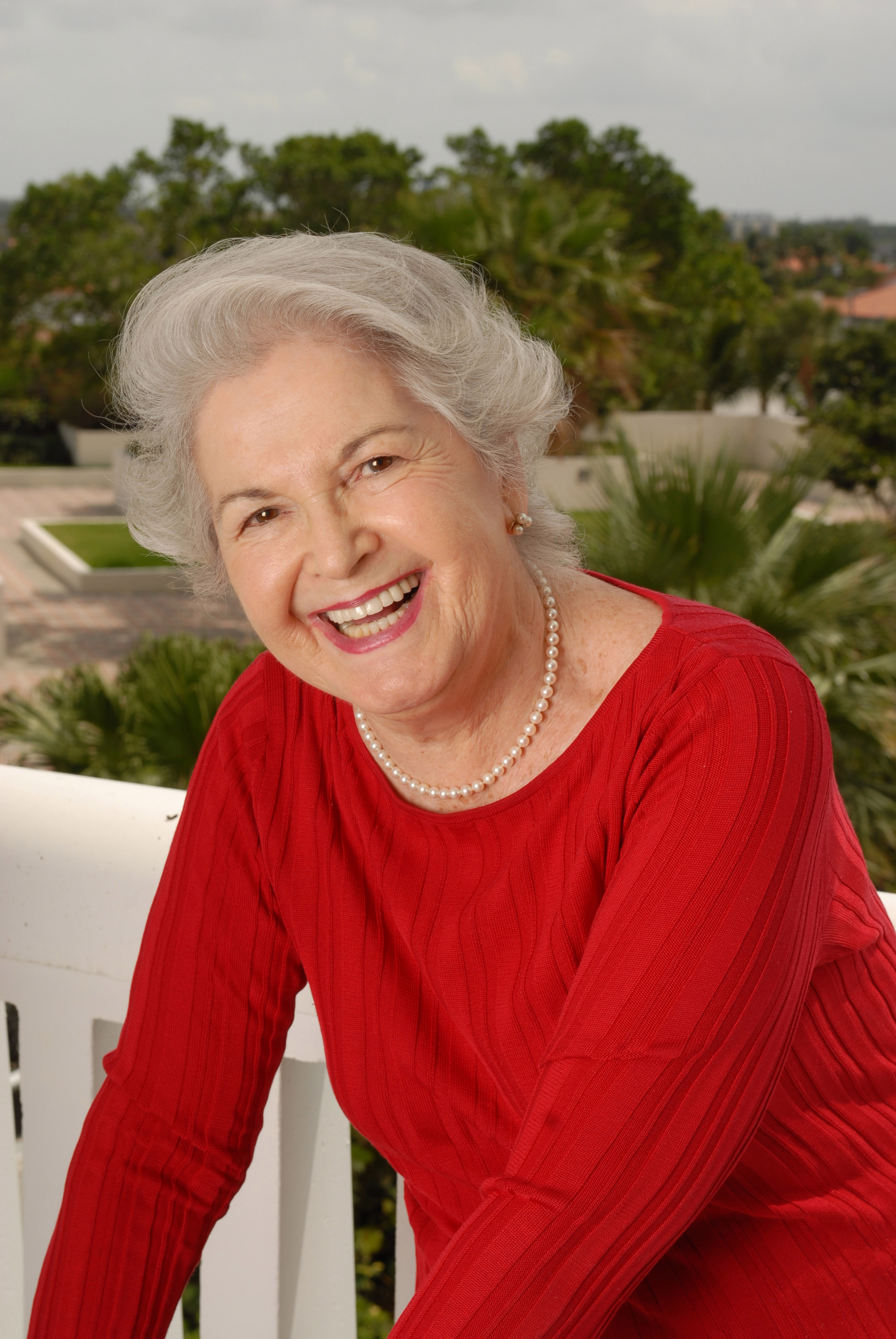
- Aranka Siegal
- Born: Aranka Davidowitz; June 10, 1930; Berehovo, Czechoslovakia (present-day Berehove, Ukraine)
- Died: November 2, 2026 (aged 96)
- Occupation: Novelist
- Writing career
- Notable awards: Newbery Honor; Boston Globe-Horn Book Award

Aranka Siegal (born Aranka Meizlik; June 10, 1930 – November 2, 2026) was an American writer and Holocaust survivor, who was a recipient of the Newbery Honor and Boston Globe-Horn Book Award, both awarded to her in 1982. She was the author of three books, the best known of which is Upon the Head of the Goat: A Childhood in Hungary 1930-1944, a memoir of her childhood in Hungary before her 12-month imprisonment in the Nazi concentration camps, Auschwitz – Birkenau and Bergen-Belsen.

Other works include Grace in the Wilderness: After the Liberation 1945-1948 and Memories of Babi. Her novels are sold worldwide and have been translated into several different languages including, but not limited to, English, French, Hungarian, Italian, Japanese, Dutch, and German. She spoke six languages.

== Early life ==
Aranka Meizlik was born in Berehovo, Czechoslovakia (present-day Berehove, Ukraine), on June 10, 1930, to Meyer and Rise Meizlik. Her mother's maiden surname was "Rosner", which she changed to Meizlik after her first marriage to Meyer Meizlik, and later to Davidowitz after her second marriage to Ignac Davidowitz. Siegal's father, Meyer Meizlik, died when she was nine months of age. While Siegal was still an infant, her mother remarried to Ignac Davidowitz. Siegal was the fifth child of seven children (Lili, Rózsi, Etus, Iboya, Aranka (Siegal), Sándor, and Joli; her four older sisters, herself, a younger half-brother, and a younger half-sister, respectively).

Growing up, Siegal would often spend her summers visiting her grandmother, Babi (born Fage Rosner), in Komjáti, a small farming community in the Carpathian Mountains. Most of Siegal's family were relatively conservative with their religious practices, keeping up with many of the Jewish customs and traditions. Siegal's grandmother, however, lived a strict orthodox life.

Sent to Auschwitz concentration camp in 1944, she was separated from her family and was only with her elder sister, Iboya. They were sent to work in Christiansted's kitchen and left for the walk to Bergen-Belsen concentration camp. In April 1945, she and her sister were liberated by Field Marshal Montgomery's 21st Army and taken to Sweden by the Swedish Red Cross. They immigrated to the United States in 1948.

== World War II ==
During World War II, when Aranka was thirteen years old, she, her mother, and her siblings, Iboya, Sándor, and Joli, were forcibly moved from their home to the Beregszász brick factory, which had been turned into a ghetto to house Jews. At the time of their departure, Siegal's stepfather, Ignac Davidowitz, was serving in the Hungarian Second Army on the Russian front. Meanwhile, her older sister, Roszi, was in Komjaty with their grandmother, and her other older sister, Etus, was in Budapest. Shortly before the family's move to the ghetto, however, some of her relatives had already been taken away by the Nazis: Lilli (Siegal's older sister), Lajos (Lilli's husband), and Manci (Lilli and Lajos's baby daughter).

Soon after Siegal and her family had arrived in the ghetto, they were deported to Auschwitz. Upon their arrival on May 9, 1944, she and Iboya, were separated from the rest of the family, and they never saw them again. Eventually, the two girls were sent to another concentration camp, Bergen-Belsen.

Little more than half a year had passed since their initial arrival into Auschwitz when they were rescued by the British First Army in early 1945. By the end of World War II, only two of Siegal's immediate family remained alive: her older sisters, Iboya and Etus. Via the Swedish Red Cross, Aranka and Iboya were brought to Sweden, where they were rehabilitated and attended a makeshift school. They later worked in a factory. The two lived in Sweden for three and a half years before emigrating to the United States in 1948, when Siegal turned eighteen years old.

== Life in the United States ==
In August 1948, Aranka and Iboya sailed from Sweden to the United States. They were reunited with some of their family in New York, where the two sisters would begin life anew. Now in the U.S., Siegal had to master her sixth language, English. In 1951, Siegal, then twenty-one years old, married her husband of late, Gilbert Siegal. Gilbert Siegal, ten years her senior, was a Harvard Law graduate and an officer of the United States Air Force during World War II.

Aranka and Gilbert Siegal resided in the New York City suburbs for most of their life together, before moving to Aventura, Florida, in 2000. They had two children, Joseph and Rissa. After their two children had gone on to college, Aranka, in her mid-forties, returned to school in pursuit of her undergraduate degree. In 1977, she received her bachelor's degree in Social Anthropology from New York University. That same year she hosted a radio show on which she recounted her experiences in Hungary and other countries.

== Later life and death ==
Siegal resided in Aventura, Florida, from 2000. Her husband, Gilbert, died in 2004. She spent much of her free time visiting schools around the country telling the story of her life and experiences during World War II. Her last book, Memories of Babi, was published in May 2008. Website : https://www.arankasiegal.com

Siegal died on November 2, 2026, at the age of 96.

== Books ==
=== Upon the Head of the Goat ===
==== About the book ====
Published by Farrar, Straus and Giroux in 1981. Siegal is the nine-year-old Piri of the narrative. The name 'Piri' comes from the Yiddish name Siegal's grandmother used to call her by, 'Perele'. During her summers visiting her grandmother, the children Siegal played with picked up on the name, but would instead say 'Piri'. Also, the title, Upon the Head of the Goat, comes from the Biblical passage, Leviticus 16, which Siegal came across while looking up the definition of "scapegoat".

==== Literary acclaim ====
Awards: Boston Globe-Horn Book Award, Newbery Honor Book, American Library Association Notable Children's Books, Janusz Korczak Literary Competition, IRA Teachers' Choices, Booklist Best Books of the '80s, Booklist Editors' Choice, and Library Journal Best Books of the Year.
Recommendations: Booklist, The Boston Globe, Bulletin-Center Child Books, Elementary School Library Collection, Horn Book, Publishers Weekly, School Library Journal, and Starred Review.

=== Grace in the Wilderness ===
==== About the book ====
Published by Farrar, Straus and Giroux, Inc. in 1985. Siegal is the fourteen-year-old Piri of the narrative. Like her first novel, the title, Grace in the Wilderness, also comes from a Biblical passage. The title of her second novel comes from Jeremiah 31.

==== Summary ====
Fourteen-year-old Piri is a survivor of the Nazi concentration camp, Auschwitz – Birkenau. After six months of being in the camp, she and her sister are liberated and rescued by the Swedish Red Cross. Soon after, she travels with her sister, Iboya, to Sweden where she is adopted by a Jewish-Swedish family. Soon she falls in love with David, giving herself a hard decision. Who will she choose? The love of her life, or Iboya, the sister who quided her through life? Piri contends with growing up, making decisions for the future, the loss of her family, and the memories of being in the camp. At the age of eighteen, Piri leaves her adoptive family to sail to the United States with her sister. Once in New York City, Piri and Iboya are reunited with some of the members of their family where they begin life anew.

==== Literary acclaim ====
Awards: NCSS-CBC Notable Trade Book in the Field of Social Studies
Recommendations: Booklist, Kirkus Reviews, The New York Times Book Review, School Library Journal, and Starred Review.

=== Memories of Babi ===
==== About the book ====
Published by Farrar, Straus and Giroux, Inc. in 2008. Aranka Siegal is the young Piri of the narrative. The nine stories in this book are inspired by Siegal's own experiences in the Ukrainian countryside with her grandmother, Babi, whom the book is titled after.

==== Literary acclaim ====
Awards: NYPL Book for Reading and Sharing, 2008 National Jewish Book Awards (Children's and Young Adult Literature Finalist), 2009 Bank Street College, Best Children's Books of the Year List, 100th Anniversary Edition, and Sydney Taylor Honor Award
Recommendations: Booklist, Horn Book, and Kirkus Reviews.
