= Poet Laureate of Connecticut =

The poet laureate of Connecticut is the poet laureate for the U.S. state of Connecticut. The poet laureate of Connecticut was established in 1985 by Public Act 85-221 of the Connecticut General Assembly. Five-year residents of the state with a demonstrated career in poetry are eligible for the honorary appointment as an advocate for poetry and literary arts.

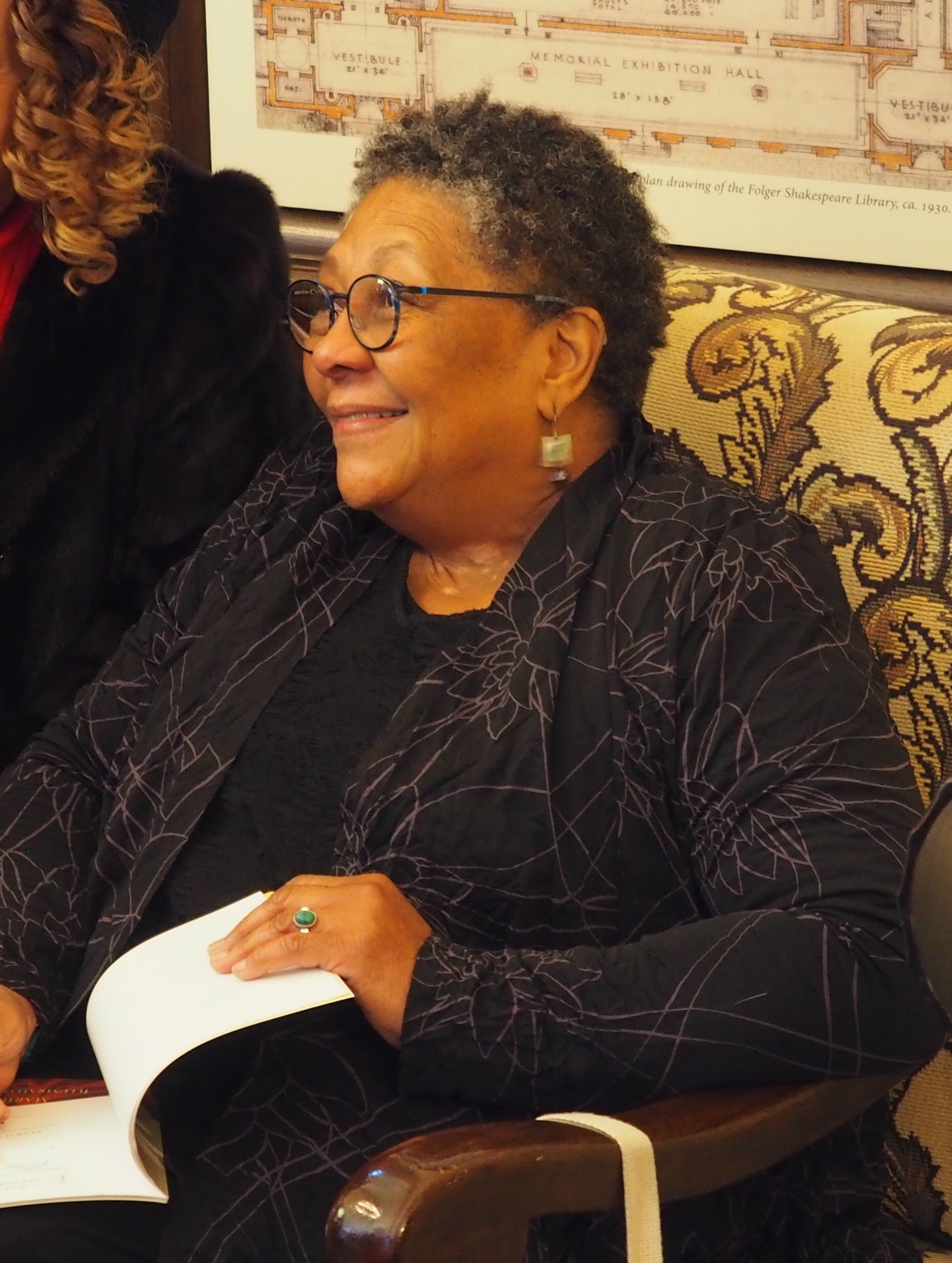
Marilyn Nelson was poet laureate in 2001.

== List of poets laureate ==
The following have held the position:

- James Merill (1985–1995)
- Leo Connellan (1996–2001)
- Marilyn Nelson (2001–2007)
- John Hollander (2007–2009)
- Dick Allen (2010–2015)
- Rennie McQuilkin (2015–2018)
- Margaret Gibson (2019–2022)
- Antoinette Brim-Bell (2022–2025)
- José B. González (2026-Present)

== See also ==
- Poet laureate
- List of U.S. state poets laureate
- United States Poet Laureate
