= Life in Motion =

2014 autobiography by Misty Copeland

Life in Motion: An Unlikely Ballerina
- Cover of Life In Motion
- Author: Misty Copeland, Charisse Jones
- Language: English
- Genre: Memoir, Autobiography
- Publisher: Touchstone
- Publication date: March 4th 2014
- Publication place: United States
- Media type: Print (hardcover, paperback)
- ISBN: 978-1-47-673798-0

Life in Motion: An Unlikely Ballerina is an autobiography by Misty Copeland, written with Charisse Jones, published March 4, 2014 by Aladdin. In the book, Copeland discusses her history toward becoming the only African-American soloist with the American Ballet Theatre following a life in which she and her family lived in poverty.

A young readers edition was published December 6, 2016.

The book was a New York Times bestseller.

== Reception ==
=== First edition ===
In a starred review on behalf of Booklist, Amber Peckham noted that Copeland's "professional success is impressive, but it’s not what makes her memoir such an unexpected page-turner". Peckham explained, "What keeps us reading is Copeland’s intelligent, fair, and warm voice. She speaks with candor about having to lose her luscious curves and cover herself with white makeup to look more acceptable on stage, but she never places blame on those who asked her to do so. Her story is an inspiration to anyone—man or woman, black or white—who has ever chased a dream against the odds, and the grace with which she triumphs is an example for us all."

Publishers Weekly described the writing as "graceful", noting that "Copeland demonstrates a remarkable ability to focus on the positive. Although she expresses a responsibility to break through color barriers for aspiring black dancers, her achievements will encourage all those attempting to beat the odds in competitive fields".

Kirkus Reviews described the book as "interesting but self-congratulatory", noting that "Copeland’s depiction of the drive that pushed her to succeed in a white-dominated art form is inspiring, but she often overplays her narrative hand to the point where self-assurance comes across as smugness or arrogance."

The Washington Post' also reviewed Life in Motion.

=== Young readers edition ===
Kirkus Reviews noted that "Copeland writes in a conversational tone" and that the book would be good for "any reader in need of inspiration".

Booklist also reviewed the young readers edition.

== Awards and honors ==
Life in Motion was a New York Times bestseller. In 2014, Booklist included Life in Motion on their list of the year's "Top 10 Arts Books". The following year, they included it on their list of 2015's "Top 10 Multicultural Nonfiction" books. In 2017, the Young Adult Library Services Association named Life in Motion a top ten selection for their list of Popular Paperbacks for Young Adults.
