= Little & Lion =

2017 young adult novel by Brandy Colbert

- First edition cover
- Author: Brandy Colbert
- Publisher: Little, Brown & Company
- Publication date: August 8, 2017
- Awards: Stonewall Book Award (2018)
- ISBN: 9780316349000

Little & Lion is a 2017 young adult novel by Brandy Colbert. The novel is about a sixteen-year-old bisexual teen dealing with her brother's recent bipolar disorder diagnosis and her own sexuality.

Little & Lion won the 2018 Stonewall Book Award.

== Reception ==
Little & Lion was well received by critics, including starred reviews from Booklist, Bulletin of the Center for Children's Books, Kirkus Reviews, and School Library Journal.

On behalf of Booklist, Sarah Hunter said the novel was "superbly written" and highlighted how, "as the plot bounces back and forth in time, Colbert juggles all the moving parts expertly, handily untangling Suzette’s complicated feelings about herself and her relationships and gradually illuminating pithy moments of discovery".

Kirkus similarly highlighted how the novel's "engrossing present-tense narration intertwines with sporadic—but pertinent—flashback chapters", as well as how "Colbert [...] sensitively confronts misconceptions about mental illness, bisexuality, and intersectional identity".

The Bulletin's Melanie Kirkwood also discussed Colbert's writing skill, highlighting how she "weaves the intricacies of adolescence with the sensitivities of family and friends adjusting to loved ones’ mental health diagnoses".

In a review for the Chicago Tribune, Christine Heppermann wrote, "Brandy Colbert has the ability to convey the experiences of modern teen life with sensitivity, candy and grace."

Writing for the Austin American-Statesman, Sharyn Vane called Little & Lion a "keenly observed coming-of-age tale".

Publishers Weekly noted that "although love and sexuality are important to the story, its core is Suzette’s feelings of responsibility for Lionel and uncertainty about how to help him. Colbert [...] powerfully depicts the difficulties that mental illness presents not just for those diagnosed but for the people around them." They critically added, "While the characters occasionally feel slightly idealized", Little & Lion is "a moving and well-realized examination of secrecy, trust, and intimacy".

Shelf Awareness's Sarah Hannah Gómez called Colbert's depiction of bipolar disorder "realistic" and "nuanced" and highlighting how "Suzette's coming to terms with her bisexuality and Lionel's bipolar disorder are given the gravity and time they deserve without pat outcomes".

The Horn Book Magazine's Katie Bircher also reviewed the novel.

== Awards and honors ==
Little & Lion is a Junior Library Guild book.

BuzzFeed, Kirkus Reviews, and Tablet named it one of the best young adult novels of 2017. Booklist also included it on their 2017 Editors' Choice: Books for Youth list.

In 2018, the American Library Association included it on their Best Fiction for Young Adults list and Rainbow List.

Little & Lion won the 2018 Stonewall Book Award for Mike Morgan & Larry Romans Children's & Young Adult Literature.
