= George Shannon (author) =

George Shannon (born 14 February, 1952) is an American children's book author. He won the ALA Booklist Editors' Choice Award for his book Tomorrow's Alphabet, and the Charlotte Zolotow Award Honor Book for Tippy-Toe Chick, Go!.

Shannon was born in Caldwell, Kansas to David, a math teacher and high school principal, and Doris, a former teacher. He has three brothers.

== Books ==
- Lizard's Song (illustrated by Jose Aruego & Ariane Dewey) (1981)
- The Piney Woods Peddler (illustrated by Nancy Tafuri) (1981)
- The Gang and Mrs. Higgins (illustrated by Andrew Vines) (1981)
- Dance Away! (illustrated by Jose Aruego & Ariane Dewey) (1982)
- The Surprise (illustrated by Jose Aruego & Ariane Dewey) (1983)
- Bean Boy (illustrated by Peter Sis) (1984)
- Oh, I Love (illustrated by Cheryl Harness) (1988)
- Sea Gifts (illustrated by Mary Azarian) (1989)
- Dancing the Breeze (illustrated by Jacqueline Rogers) (1991)
- Laughing All the Way (illustrated by Meg McLean) (1992)
- Climbing Kansas Mountains (illustrated by Thomas B. Allen) (1993)
- Seeds (illustrated by Steve Bjorkman) (1994)
- Heart to Heart (illustrated by Steve Bjorkman) (1995)
- April Showers (illustrated by Jose Aruego & Ariane Dewey) (1995)
- Spring: A Haiku Story (illustrated by Malcah Zeldis) (1996)
- Tomorrow's Alphabet (illustrated by Donald Crews) (1996)
- This Is the Bird (illustrated by David Soman) (1997)
- Lizard's Home (illustrated by Jose Aruego & Ariane Dewey) (1999)
- Frog Legs: A Picture Book of Action Verse (illustrated by Amit Trynan) (2000)
- Tippy-Toe Chick, Go! (illustrated by Laura Dronzek) (2003)
- Lizard's Guest (illustrated by Jose Aruego & Ariane Dewey) (2003)
- Wise Acres (illustrated by Deborah Zemke) (2004)
- White Is for Blueberry (illustrated by Laura Dronzek) (2005)
- The Secret Chicken Club (illustrated by Deborah Zemke) (2005)
- Busy in the Garden (illustrated by Sam Williams) (2006)
- Rabbit's Gift (illustrated by Laura Dronzek) (2007)
- Who Put the Cookies in the Cookie Jar? (illustrated by Julie Paschkis) (2013)
- A Very Witchy Spelling Bee (illustrated by Mark Fearing) (2013)
- Turkey Tot (illustrated by Jennifer K. Mann) (2013)
- Hands Say Love (illustrated by Taeeun Yoo) (2014)
- One Family (illustrated by Blanca Gomez) (2015)
