= Allen Say =

Japanese-American writer and illustrator (born 1937)

- 清井
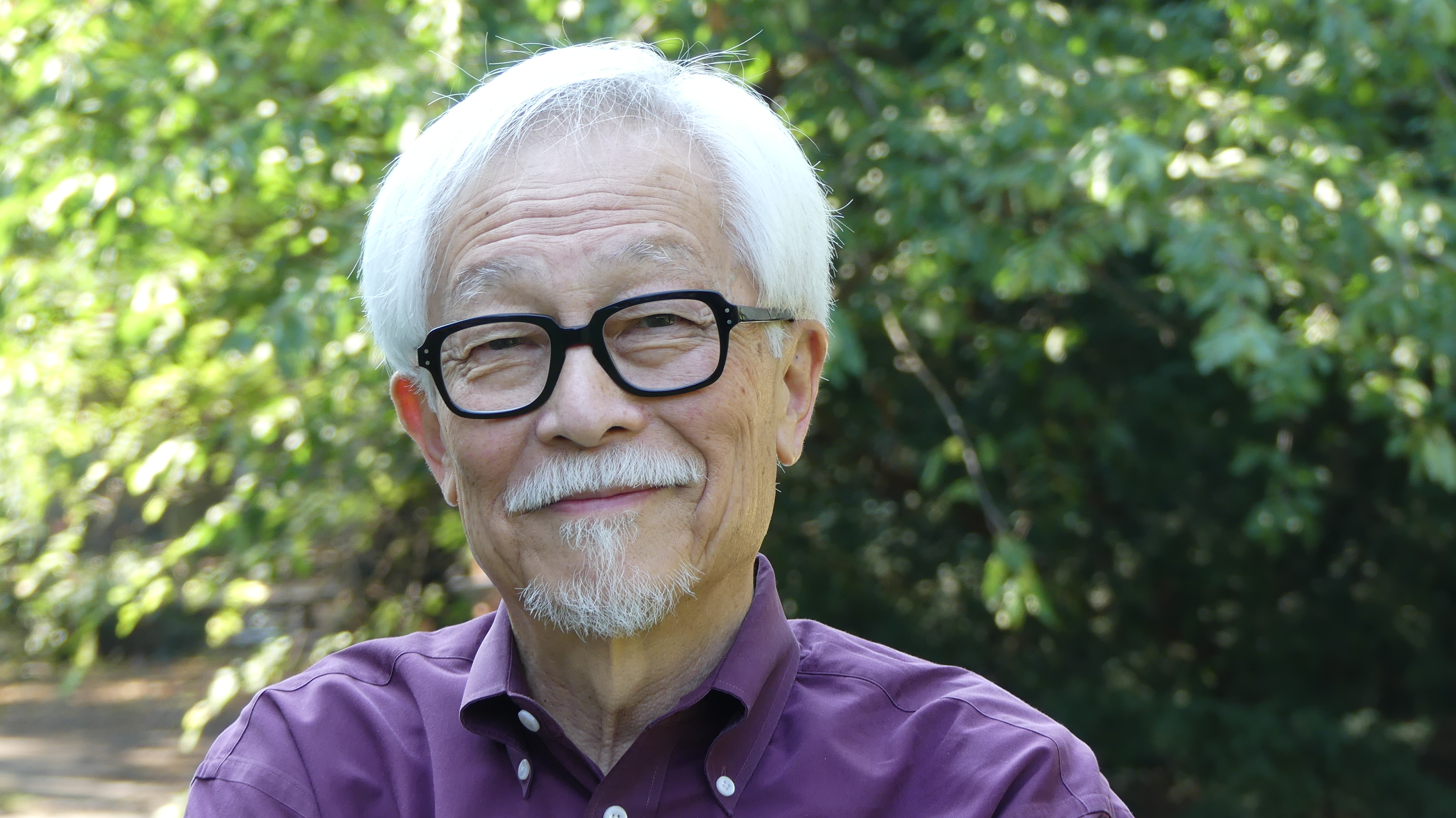
- Allen Say at the 2016 Berlin International Literature Festival
- Born: James Allen Koichi Moriwaki Seii; August 28, 1937 (age 88); Yokohama, Japan
- Alma mater: Aoyama Gakuin; Chouinard Art Institute; Los Angeles Art Center; University of California, Berkeley; San Francisco Art Institute
- Occupations: Writer, illustrator
- Spouse: Deidre Myles (m. 1974)
- Children: 1
- Writing career
- Language: English
- Genre: Children's literature
- Notable work: Grandfather's Journey
- Notable awards: ALA Notable Book Award 1979 The Ink-Keepers Apprentice; ALA Best Book for Young Adults 1979 The Ink-Keepers Apprentice; Horn Book honor list 1984 How My Parents Learned to Eat; Christopher Award 1985 How My Parents Learned to Eat; Boston Globe/Horn Book Award 1988 The Boy of the Three-Year Nap; Caldecott Honor 1989 The Boy of the Three-Year Nap; Caldecott Medal 1994 Grandfather's Journey

Allen Say (born James Allen Koichi Moriwaki Seii in 1937; surname written Seii (清井) in Japanese) is a Japanese-American writer and illustrator. He is best known for Grandfather's Journey, a children's picture book detailing his grandfather's voyage from Japan to the United States and back again, which won the 1994 Caldecott Medal for illustration. This story is autobiographical and relates to Say's constant moving during his childhood. His work mainly focuses on Japanese and Japanese American characters and their stories, and several works have autobiographical elements.

== Biography ==
Allen Say was born in Yokohama, Japan on August 28, 1937 to a Japanese American mother (born in San Francisco) and a Korean born father (adopted by British parents and raised in Shanghai). At age 8, his parents got divorced. At age 12, four years after his parents' divorce, Say went to live with his maternal grandmother, but received her permission a short time later to live alone. The boy apprenticed himself for many years to his favorite cartoonist, Noro Shinpei, an experience detailed in his book Drawing from Memory, as well as the basis of his semi-autobiographical novel The Ink-Keeper's Apprentice. In that time Say came to think of Shinpei as his "spiritual father," as well as a mentor.

When his father decided to move to the United States with his new family, Say was invited to come along. He attended military school for a short time, an experience that was decidedly negative: "I learned bad English from rich juvenile delinquents and developed a lifelong loathing for uniforms and professional soldiers." He was eventually expelled for smoking a cigarette. Afterward, Say enrolled himself at Citrus Union High School, where he was able to continue his studies in art and graduated in 1956. His early experiences in the United States were outlined in his book The Inker's Shadow. In the years before becoming a full-time author and illustrator, Say worked as a sign painter and photographer, as well as being drafted into the U.S. Army for a time. While stationed in Germany, his photography was noted and eventually published in the magazine, Stars and Stripes. Upon returning to the United States, he pursued photography as a career choice, but was encouraged to explore his illustrations. He was approached by Houghton Mifflin with a retelling of a Japanese folktale, The Boy of the Three-Year Nap.

In 1994, fellow children's author Lois Lowry mentioned Say in her Newbery Award acceptance speech for The Giver, having discovered the day of the ceremony that in childhood, both authors lived in the same Tokyo neighborhood, Shibuya. The two authors spoke for the first time when each autographed a book for the other and she signed hers in Japanese.

Say married Deidre Myles on April 18, 1974. Say has lived in Portland, Oregon, since 1999. His book Drawing from Memory won an Oregon Book Award for children's literature in 2013.

== Works ==
- Dr. Smith's Safari (1972)
- The Nose: A Tale Based on "Hana" by R. Akutagawa (1973)
- Once Under the Cherry Blossom Tree: An Old Japanese Tale (1974)
- The Feast of Lanterns (1976)
- Morning Glories (1976) (illustrations & translation of Naoya Shiga's story)
- Magic and the Night River (1978) (illustrations)
- The Lucky Yak (1980)
- The Bicycle Man (1982)
- How My Parents Learned to Eat (1984) (illustrations)
- The Boy of the Three-Year Nap (1988) (illustrations) (Caldecott Honor)
- A River Dream (1988)
- The Lost Lake (1989)
- El Chino (1990)
- The Big Book for Peace (1990) (Written by Yoshiko Uchida)
- Tree of Cranes (1991)
- Grandfather's Journey (1993) (Caldecott Medal)
- The Ink-Keeper's Apprentice (First edition - 1979; Second edition - 1994)
- Stranger in the Mirror (1995)
- Emma's Rug (1996)
- Allison (1997)
- Tea with Milk (1999)
- The Sign Painter (2000)
- Home of the Brave (2002)
- Music for Alice (2004)
- Kamishibai Man (2005)
- Erika-san (2009)
- The Boy in the Garden (2010)
- Drawing From Memory (2011)
- The Favorite Daughter (2013)
- The Inker's Shadow (2015)
- Silent Days, Silent Dreams (2017)
- Almond (2020)
- Kozo The Sparrow (2023)
- Miss Irwin (2023)
- Tonbo (2024)

== See also ==
- List of children's literature authors
- List of Asian American writers
