= Tibet: Through the Red Box =

1998 book by Peter Sís

Tibet Through the Red Box
- Author: Peter Sís
- Illustrator: Peter Sís
- Cover artist: Peter Sís
- Language: English
- Genre: Memoir, non-fiction
- Publisher: Farrar, Straus and Giroux
- Publication date: November 5, 1998
- Publication place: United States
- Media type: Print
- Pages: 64
- Awards: Caldecott Honor Book, Boston Globe-Horn Book Award, Deutscher Jugendliteraturpreis
- ISBN: 0-374-37552-6

Tibet Through the Red Box is a children's book written and illustrated by Peter Sís, designed by art director, Lilian Rosenstreich, and published by the Farrar, Straus and Giroux imprint Frances Foster Books in 1998. It was adapted into a play by David Henry Hwang in 2004.

The book is an illustrated memoir based on the author's childhood recollections of his father's experiences as a documentary filmmaker in China and Tibet during the early 1950s, as well as Sís's response to reading the diary his father kept in the titular red box for the first time, more than forty years later.

It received the Boston Globe-Horn Book Award for Special Citation, the American Library Association's Caldecott Honor, and the Deutscher Jugendliteraturpreis in 1999.
