= Grandfather's Journey =

1993 picture book by Allen Say

- Author: Allen Say
- Illustrator: Allen Say
- Cover artist: Allen Say
- Language: English
- Genre: Children's picture book
- Publisher: Houghton Mifflin
- Publication date: 1993
- Publication place: United States
- Pages: 32
- ISBN: 978-0-395-57035-7
- OCLC: 27810899
- Dewey Decimal: [E] 20
- LC Class: PZ7.S2744 Gr 1993

Grandfather's Journey is a children’s picture book written by Allen Say. The story is told from the perspective of Say, who narrates his grandfather’s immigration between Japan and the United States. Say’s grandfather subsequently moves back to Japan. Released by Houghton Mifflin, the book was positively received by critics and reviewers, and Say received the Caldecott Medal for illustration in 1994. Grandfather’s Journey is often cited as a culturally significant work in its AAPI representation. In 2008, Weston Woods Studios, Inc. made a film based on the book, narrated by B. D. Wong.

== Plot ==
A young man from Japan, during the Meiji era, crosses the Pacific Ocean and explores the United States. He finds that of all the places he has seen, he likes coastal California best because of the beautiful Sierra Mountains. Eventually, he returns home to Japan and marries his childhood sweetheart.

The young man takes his new bride across the sea and they settle in California, where they have a daughter. As he watches his daughter grow up, the man is filled with nostalgia for his own childhood. He eventually decides to take his family back to Japan when his daughter is nearly grown up.

The man is happy to see his old friends again, but moves from the village where he grew up to a city nearby in order to satisfy his daughter, who has spent her entire life living in a city. She eventually marries and has a son, who is the narrator of the story. The man, now the titular grandfather of the story, finds that once again he misses California.

He plans a trip to see his adopted country again with his grandson, but never gets a chance to see California again as a result of World War II. His grandson eventually grows up and follows the same journey as his grandfather, understanding his grandfather's feelings towards two places he called home.

== Reception ==
The book was largely met with high praise for both its written content and for its illustrations’ abilities to elicit the emotions and realities of the immigrant life of an Asian American. Critics commended the book’s text, citing it as "direct, lyrical narrative" and its approachability given its "simple text" for a younger audience.

The illustrations of Grandfather’s Journey were equally applauded, with Publishers Weekly citing Say’s paintings and "sepia tones" as reminiscent of a "carefully preserved family album." In a 1994 interview, Say is quoted as having said that he sought to create this effect. Another critic comments that Say’s portraiture in the book invites readers to create their own interpretations and possibilities of the story behind the paintings. The book received a Caldecott Award in 1994 as one of Say’s "most well-received and popular books."

== Cultural impact and relevance ==
Many scholars and reviewers cite Grandfather’s Journey’s inclusivity and encompassing of the immigrant experience. The book is also noted for its focus on racial diversity and "universally shared emotions." Furthermore, in the context of children’s literature, Say’s work is one of a handful of books that is by someone whom scholars Noreen Rodriguez and Esther Kim dub "cultural insiders." Additionally, works such as Grandfather’s Journey address the Asian and Asian American experience amidst a genre widely known to "reinforce harmful and inaccurate stereotypes" and tropes such as the "model minority" or the notion that Asian American immigrants struggle to assimilate. Others agree that Asian American children’s literature is often inaccurate in its telling of the Asian or Asian American story, with one study citing that in 1976, only 66 out of approximately 3,000 children’s books published that year featured a "central character" that "were Asian American." Yet, Grandfather’s Journey is cited as a work amidst this genre that provides an "authentic portrayal…about the AAPI experience."

However, a more recent study found that there has been an "improvement" in both the number of children’s books about Asian American communities, as well as "the diversity of Asian American representations" between 2007 and 2017. Scholars also note different avenues to continue this trend, including the support of increased inclusion and recognition of more Asian and Asian American children’s books amongst teachers and librarians. For example, children’s literature reviewer and resource provider Gathering Books includes Grandfather’s Journey in their "Festival of Asian Literature and the Immigrant Experience" recommendations.

Awards
Preceded by Mirette on the High Wire	Caldecott Medal recipient 1994	Succeeded by Smoky Night
