= Marilyn Nelson =

American poet, translator, and children's book author (born 1946)

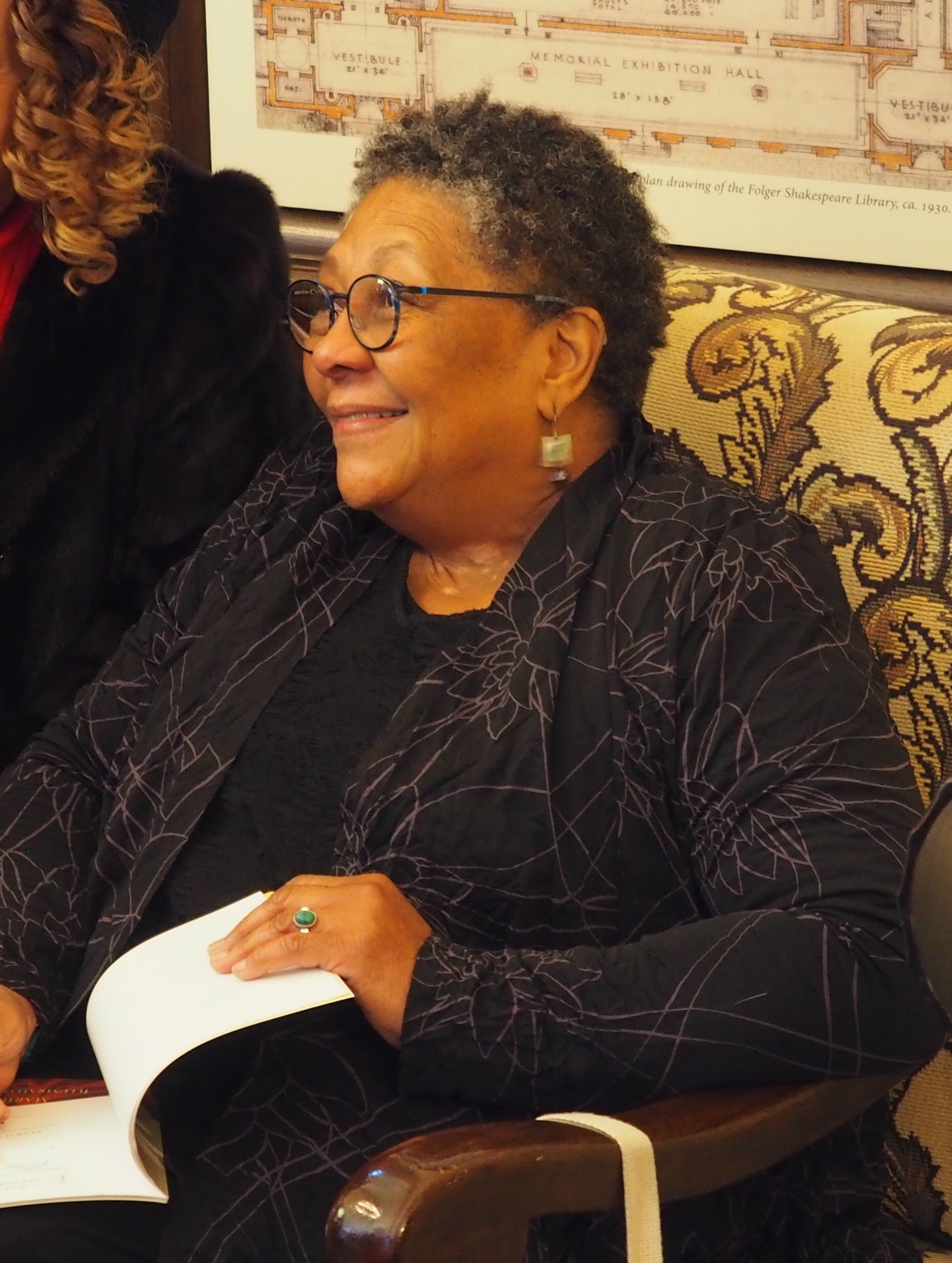
- Born: April 26, 1946 (age 80); Cleveland, Ohio, U.S.
- Education: University of California-Davis; University of Pennsylvania; University of Minnesota
- Occupations: Professor, author, translator
- Writing career
- Pen name: Marilyn Nelson Waniek
- Language: English
- Genre: Poetry

Marilyn Nelson (born April 26, 1946) is an American poet, translator, biographer, and children's book author. She is a professor emeritus at the University of Connecticut, and the former Poet Laureate of Connecticut. She is a winner of the Ruth Lilly Poetry Prize, the NSK Neustadt Prize for Children’s Literature, and the Frost Medal. From 1978 to 1994, she published under the name Marilyn Nelson Waniek. She is the author or translator of more than twenty books and five chapbooks of poetry for adults and children. While most of her work deals with historical subjects, in 2014 she published a memoir, named one of NPR's Best Books of 2014, entitled How I Discovered Poetry.

== Early life ==
Nelson was born on April 26, 1946, in Cleveland, Ohio, to Melvin M. Nelson, a Tuskegee Airman and a U.S. serviceman in the Air Force, and Johnnie Mitchell Nelson, a teacher and pianist. She grew up on military bases and moved all across the United States throughout her childhood. She began writing while in elementary school, yet discovered her love for poetry while attending a segregated middle school in Texas. Here, she was introduced to the work of African-American poets.

Nelson earned a B.A. degree from the University of California-Davis, an M.A. from the University of Pennsylvania in 1970, and a Ph.D. from the University of Minnesota in 1979.

== Career ==
In 1978, Nelson became a professor of English at the University of Connecticut and published her first book, the poetry collection For the Body. From 2001 to 2006, she served as poet laureate of the State of Connecticut. During this time, she also founded the Soul Mountain Retreat. She retired professor emeritus from the University of Connecticut in 2002 yet continued to actively write.

Nelson's poetry has a dominant family aspect, recovery for African-American history as well as the search for sacred in everyday life. She is also known for incorporating the African-American oral tradition into her work. Her poetry collections include The Homeplace (Louisiana State University Press), which won the 1992 Anisfield-Wolf Book Award and was a finalist for the 1991 National Book Award; and The Fields Of Praise: New And Selected Poems (Louisiana State University Press), which won the Poets' Prize in 1999 and was a finalist for the 1997 National Book Award.

Her honors include two NEA creative writing fellowships, the 1990 Connecticut Arts Award, a Fulbright Teaching Fellowship, and a 2001 Guggenheim Fellowship. In 2011, she spent a semester as a Brown Foundation Fellow at the University of the South in Sewanee, Tennessee. In 2012, the Poetry Society of America awarded her the Frost Medal. In 2013, Nelson was elected a chancellor of the Academy of American Poets.

== Published works ==
=== Poetry books ===
- For the Body (Louisiana State University Press, 1978, ISBN 978-0-8071-0464-4)
- Mama's Promises (Louisiana State University Press, 1985, ISBN 978-0-8071-1250-2)
- The Homeplace (Louisiana State University Press, 1990, ISBN 978-0-8071-1641-8)
- Magnificat (Louisiana State University Press, 1994, ISBN 978-0-8071-1921-1)
- The Fields of Praise: New and Selected Poems (Louisiana State University Press, 1997, ISBN 978-0-8071-2175-7)
- Carver: A Life in Poems (Front Street, 2001, ISBN 978-1-886910-53-9)
- Fortune’s Bones: The Manumission Requiem (Front Street, 2004, notes and annotations by Pamela Espeland)
- The Cachoeira Tales, and Other Poems (Louisiana State University Press, 2005, ISBN 978-0-8071-3064-3)
- A Wreath for Emmett Till (Houghton Mifflin, 2005, Illustrator Philippe Lardy, ISBN 978-0-618-39752-5)
- The Freedom Business: Including A Narrative of the Life and Adventures of Venture, a Native of Africa (Front Street, 2008, ISBN 978-1-932425-57-4)
- Sweethearts of Rhythm: The Story Of The Greatest All-Girl Swing Band In The World (Dial Books, 2009, Illustrator Jerry Pinkney, ISBN 9780803731875)
- Faster Than Light: New and Selected Poems, 1996-2011 (Louisiana State University Press, 2012, ISBN 978-0-8071-4734-4)
- My Seneca Village (Namelos, 2015, ISBN 978-1-6089-8197-7)
- The Meeting House (Antrim House, 2016, ISBN 978-1-9438-2612-4)
- American Ace (Dial Books, 2016, ISBN 978-0-8037-3305-3)
- How I Discovered Poetry (Speak, 2016, ISBN 978-0-1475-1005-1)

=== Chapbooks ===
- Partial Truth (The Kutenai Press, 1992)
- She-Devil Circus (Aralia Press, 2001)
- Triolets for Triolet (Curbstone Press, 2001)
- The Freedom Business: Connecticut Landscapes Through the Eyes of Venture Smith (Lyme Historical Society, Florence Griswold Museum, 2006, illustrated by American paintings from the Florence Griswold Museum)

=== Collaborative books ===
- The Cat Walked Through the Casserole (Carolrhoda Books, 1984, with Pamela Espeland, various illustrators)
- Miss Crandall’s School for Young Ladies and Little Misses of Color (Wordsong, 2007, with Elizabeth Alexander, illustrated by Floyd Cooper, ISBN 978-1-59078-456-3)
- Pemba's Song: A Ghost Story (Scholastic Press, 2008, with Tonya Hegamin)
- Mrs. Nelson's Class (editor, World Enough Writers, 2012)

=== Translations ===
- Hundreds of Hens and Other Poems for Children by Halfdan Rasmussen (translated from Danish, Black Willow Press, 1982, with Pamela Espeland, illustrations by D.M. Robinson)
- Hecuba by Euripides, in Euripides I, Penn Greek Drama Series (translated from earlier English translations, University of Pennsylvania Press, 1998)
- The Thirteenth Month by Inge Pedersen (translated from Danish, Oberlin College Press, 2005)
- The Ladder by Halfdan Rasmussen (translated from Danish, Candlewick, 2006, illustrated by Pierre Pratt)
- A Little Bitty Man and Other Poems for the Very Young by Halfdan Rasmussen (translated from Danish with Pamela Espeland, Candlewick, 2011, illustrated by Kevin Hawkes)

=== Books for young children ===
- The Cat Walked Through the Casserole (Carolrhoda Books, 1984)
- Beautiful Ballerina (Scholastic Press, 2009, photographs by Susan Kuklin, ISBN 978-0-545-08920-3)
- Snook Alone (Candlewick Press, 2010, illustrated by Timothy Basil Ering, ISBN 978-0-7636-2667-9)
- Ostrich and Lark (Boyds Mills Press, 2012, illustrated by San artists of the Kuru Art Project of Botswana, ISBN 978-1-5907-8702-1)

=== Anthology contributions ===
- Ghost Fishing: An Eco-Justice Poetry Anthology (University of Georgia Press, 2018)

== Honors and awards ==
- Kent fellowship, 1976
- National Endowment for the Arts fellowships, 1981, 1990
- Connecticut Arts Award, 1990
- National Book Award finalist for poetry, 1991
- Anisfield-Wolf Book Award, 1992
- Fulbright teaching fellowship, 1995
- National Book Award finalist for poetry, 1997
- The Poets Award, 1998
- Poets' Prize, 1999, for The Fields of Praise: New and Selected Poems
- Contemplative Practices fellowship, American Council of Learned Societies, 2000
- Poet Laureate for the State of Connecticut, Connecticut Commission on the Arts, 2001-2006
- J.S. Guggenheim Memorial Foundation fellowship, 2001 for Carver: A Life in Poems
- Boston Globe/Horn Book Award, 2001 for Carver: A Life in Poems
- National Book Award finalist in young-people's literature category, 2001 for Carver: A Life in Poems
- Coretta Scott King Honor Book designation, 2002 for Carver: A Life in Poems
- Flora Stieglitz Straus Award for Nonfiction, 2002 for Carver: A Life in Poems
- Newbery Honor designation, 2002 for Carver: A Life in Poems
- Coretta Scott King Book Award, 2005, for Fortune's Bones: The Manumission Requiem
- Two Pushcart prizes
- Michael L. Printz Award honor book designation, 2006 for A Wreath for Emmett Till
- Lee Bennett Hopkins Poetry Award honor book designation, 2006 for A Wreath for Emmett Till
- Coretta Scott King Honor Award, 2006 for A Wreath for Emmett Till
- Lifetime Achievement honor, Connecticut Book Awards, 2006,
- NSK Neustadt Prize for Children’s Literature, 2017.
- Ruth Lilly Poetry Prize, 2019. Noted for being "a renowned poet, author, and translator who has worked steadily throughout her career to highlight topics that aren’t often talked about in poetry. Her literary work, spanning more than four decades, examines complex issues around race, feminism, and the ongoing trauma of slavery in American life in narratives poised between song and speech."

== Speeches and talks ==
Sarah Rebecca Warren. "Telling It Slant: A Conversation with Marilyn Nelson". World Literature Today, vol. 92, no. 2, 2018, pp. 57–59. JSTOR, https://doi.org/10.7588/worllitetoda.92.2.0057. Retrieved 10 October 2023.
