= Starry Messenger (picture book) =

- First edition
- Author: Peter Sís
- Cover artist: Peter Sis
- Language: English
- Subject: Biography
- Published: Square Fish; Reprint edition (2000)
- Publication place: United States
- Pages: 40 p.

Starry Messenger, about Galileo Galilei, is a children's picture book that was written and illustrated by Peter Sís. And designed by art director, Lilian Rosenstreich in 1996. It is a 1997 Caldecott Honor book. Through the use of his illustrations, Peter Sis documents different stages of life of the widely acknowledged scientist Galileo Galilei.

== Plot ==
Starry Messenger, written and illustrated by Peter Sís, documents the life of the scientist Galileo Galilei. Told from third person point of view and dating back to his birth, Sís walks the reader through the events that shape the life of the recognized scientist, mathematician, philosopher, and physicist, Galileo Galilei. The book opens with a prelude, with careful illustrations, Peter Sís sets the stage for the story by laying the groundwork of what the world was like during Galileo's era; scientifically, and religiously. He introduces the reader to the then accepted ideology of the Ptolemaic system, which stated that the Earth was the center of the Solar System. Sís describes Galileo as a boy "born with stars in his eyes", this metaphor will run throughout the length of the story connecting prominent events that occur within Galileo's life, including life as a child, a scholar, and later a scientist. Inter sped with Sís's original illustrations are excerpts of Galileo's actual drawings and excerpts of his Starry Messenger which documents Galileo's astronomical discoveries and observations especially the Copernican theory which got him in trouble with the Vatican Church. From being celebrated for his other astronomical discoveries to the controversial Copernican theory, Peter Sís documents these events with intricate illustrations that vividly resemble Galileo's own, adding depth to the story. The peak of the story occurs when Galileo's Copernican Theory reaches the Pope, and Galileo is viewed in negative light and criticism. Upon Galileo's summoning to the Vatican Church, he was forced to retract his earlier statements that contradicted with the ideologies of the Vatican Church regarding the placement of the Earth, or risk death. Galileo chose to retract his statements and was confined to house arrest for eight years before his death in 1642. The book ends on a positive note when Sís writes about the Pardon that was issued to Galileo more than three hundred years later in October 1992.

== Critical reception ==
Peter Sís's documentation of the scientist, Galileo Galileo's life received positive reviews from: Kirkus Reviews, Booklist, School Library Journal and more. The New York Times had a section dedicated to the book praising Sis's book, Elizabeth Spires writes, "The story of Galileo is not about a larger-than-life hero, but of someone understandably human." She also writes, "in creating this original and exquisite book, affirms the power of one individual to change our ideas about the universe we live in." The reviews commentate Pete Sis's achievements in portraying Galileo's life with "stellar illustrations" and interweaving some of Galileo's original content from his Starry Messenger.
