= Charisse Jones =

American journalist and essayist (born American journalist and essayist)

Charisse Jones (born October 14, 1966) is an American journalist and essayist.

== Life ==
She was a staff writer for The New York Times and the Los Angeles Times, and a commentator for National Public Radio. She has been a national correspondent for USA Today and a contributing writer for Essence magazine.

While at the Los Angeles Times, Jones covered social justice issues and the LA riots, for which she won a Pulitzer Prize.

In 2010, Jones became USA Today's travel writer.

She has one son.

== Awards ==
- 2004 American Book Award

== Works ==
- Charisse Jones; Kumea Shorter-Gooden (2004). Shifting: The Double Lives of Black Women in America. HarperCollins. ISBN 978-0-06-009055-5.
