= Peter Sís =

Czech-born American illustrator and writer (born 1949)

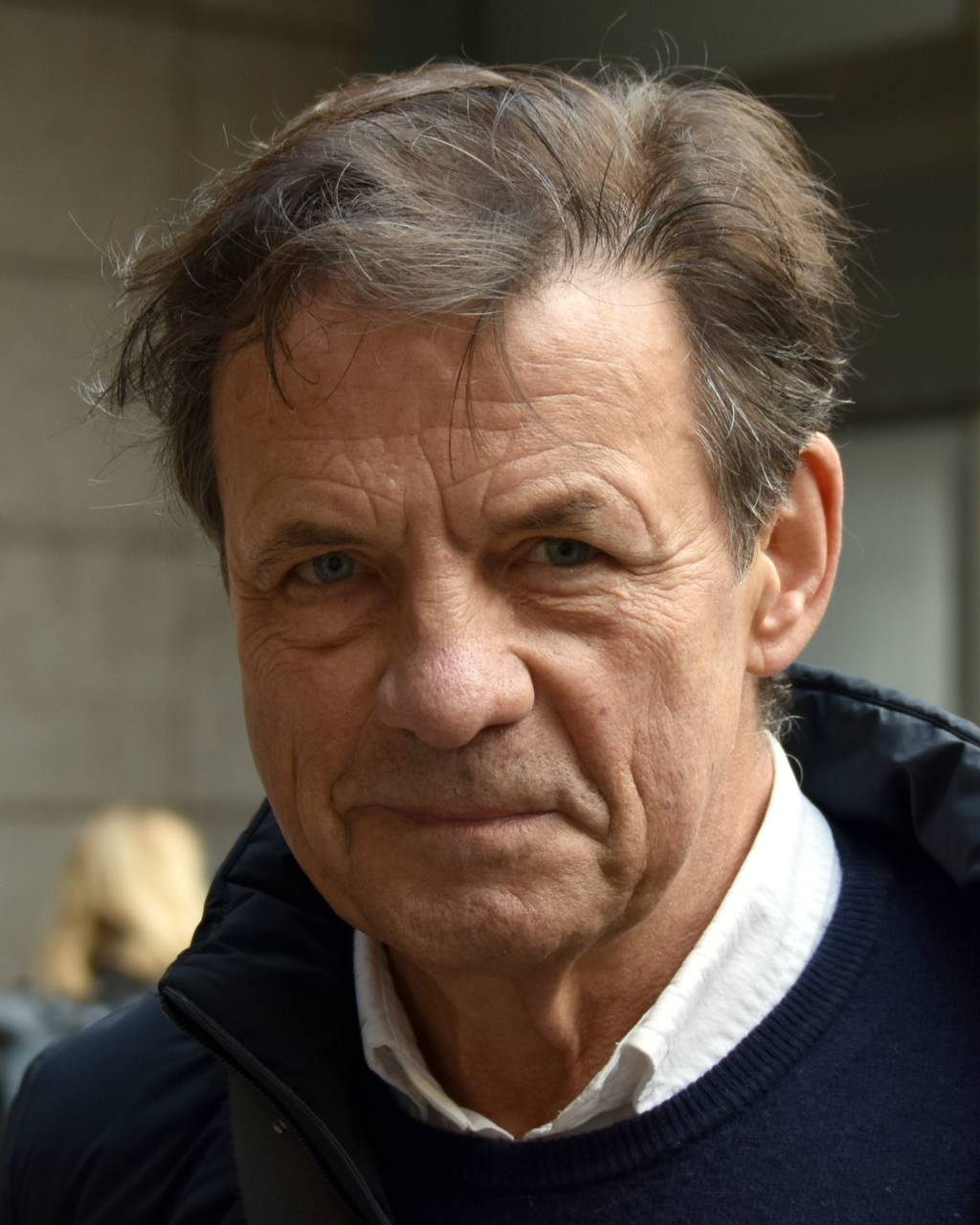
- Born: Petr Sís; May 11, 1949 (age 77); Brno, Czechoslovakia
- Citizenship: United States (1988)
- Occupations: Illustrator, cartoonist
- Spouse: Terry Lajtha
- Children: Madeleine, Matej
- Writing career
- Genres: Children's picture books, editorial cartoons
- Website: petersis.com

Peter Sís (born Petr Sís; May 11, 1949) is a Czech-born American illustrator and writer of children's books. As a cartoonist his editorial illustrations have appeared in Time, Newsweek, Esquire, and The Atlantic Monthly. In 2012 he received the Hans Christian Andersen Medal for his "lasting contribution" as an illustrator of children's literature.

== Background ==
Peter Sís was born in Brno, Czechoslovakia in 1949. His father was a filmmaker and his mother was an artist. He is the oldest of three siblings, has a younger sister Hana and younger brother David, who became a film director after his father. As a teenager, Sís developed an interest in Western culture, Allen Ginsberg's beat poetry, long hair for men, blue jeans and rock and roll, particularly the music of The Beatles, The Beach Boys and The Rolling Stones. Sís was educated at The High School of Applied Arts, the Academy of Applied Arts in Prague and the Royal College of Art in London, where he studied with Quentin Blake. When he graduated, he began a career as a filmmaker, later winning a Golden Bear Award for an animated short, Hlavy, at the 1980 West Berlin Film Festival.

Sís travelled to the United States in 1982 "to create an animated film based on Czechoslovakia's participation in the Olympics" that were upcoming in Los Angeles. The Soviet Union initiated a boycott that included Czechoslovakia but Sís did not return home. He remained in America and was granted asylum. In the U.S. he began illustrating and writing books. He has occasionally returned to filmmaking, producing commercials for Nickelodeon & PBS Kids, plus shorts for Sesame Street based on his book Madlenka.

Sís became a U.S. citizen in 1988.

== Awards ==
- The New York Times Book Review Best Illustrated Book of the Year award (eight times).
- American Library Association's Caldecott Honor for the illustrations of his 1996 book, Starry Messenger, the 1998 book Tibet Through The Red Box, and his 2007 work, The Wall: Growing Up Behind the Iron Curtain.
- Robert Silbert Medal awarded forThe Wall: Growing Up Behind the Iron Curtain by the American Library Association for the most distinguished informational book for young readers.
- Boston Globe–Horn Book Award four times: for Komodo (1993), A Small Tall Tale From the Far Far North (1994), Tibet Through The Red Box (1999), and The Wall: Growing Up Behind the Iron Curtain (2008).
- Deutscher Jugendliteraturpreis for Tibet Through the Red Box.
- MacArthur Fellowship Award in 2003.
- Golden Bear Award at the 1980 Berlin International Film Festival for an animated short.
- Grand Prix Toronto
- Cine Golden Eagle Award.
- Hans Christian Andersen Award conferred by the International Board on Books for Young People : the highest recognition available to a writer or illustrator of children's books. Sís received the illustration award in 2012.
- Society of Illustrators Lifetime Achievement Award (2015) for his body of work and impact on the field of illustration.
- Bohemian Benevolent & Literary Association Award (2022) for achievements in promoting the Czech culture and history, the tradition of illustration as well as contributing to human rights through the arts.

== Selected Works ==
- Rainbow Rhino (1987)
- Waving (1988)
- Going Up! (1989)
- Beach Ball (1990)
- Follow the Dream: The Story of Christopher Columbus (1991)
- An Ocean World (1992)
- Komodo! (1993)
- A Small Tall Tale from the Far Far North (1993)
- The Three Golden Keys (1994)
- Starry Messenger: ... Galileo Galilei (1996)
- Fire Truck (1998)
- Tibet: Through the Red Box (1998)
- Trucks, Trucks, Trucks (1999)
- Ship Ahoy! (1999)
- Madlenka (2000)
- Dinosaur! (2000)
- Ballerina (2001)
- Madlenka's Dog (2002)
- The Tree of Life: ... Charles Darwin ... (2003)
- The Train of States (2004)
- Play, Mozart, Play (2006)
- The Wall: Growing Up Behind the Iron Curtain (2007)
- Madlenka Soccer Star (2010)
- The Conference of the Birds (2011)
- The Pilot and the Little Prince (2014)
- Ice Cream Summer (2015)
- Nicky & Vera: A Quiet Hero of the Holocaust and the Children He Rescued (2021)

=== As illustrator only ===
- Miloš Forman and Peter Shaffer, Amadeus, film poster (1984)
- George Shannon, Bean Boy (1984)
- George Shannon, Stories to Solve: folktales from around the world (1985)
- Sid Fleischman, The Whipping Boy (1986)
- Sid Fleischman, The Scarebird (1987)
- Sid Fleischman, The Midnight Horse (1990)
- George Shannon, More Stories to Solve: fifteen folktales from around the world (1990)
- Jack Prelutsky, The Dragons Are Singing Tonight (1993)
- George Shannon, Still More Stories to Solve: fourteen folktales from around the world (1994)
- Sid Fleischman, The 13th Floor: a ghost story (1995)
- Jack Prelutsky, Monday's Troll (1996)
- Jacques Taravant, Le marchand d'ailes (1997)
- Jack Prelutsky, The Gargoyle on the Roof (1999)
- Johann Wolfgang von Goethe, Faust Part I (2000)
- Jack Prelutsky, Scranimals (2002)
- Jorge Luis Borges, The Book of Imaginary Beings (2006)
- Sid Fleischman, The Dream Stealer (2009)
- Pam Muñoz Ryan, The Dreamer (2010)
- Ada Limón, In Praise of Mystery (2024)

== See also ==
- Amnesty-Sís-Pinton Tapestries
