= Carver: A Life in Poems =

Book by Marilyn Nelson

- Author: Marilyn Nelson
- Language: English
- Genre: Novel
- Publisher: Front Street, an imprint of Boyds Mills Press
- Publication date: 1997
- Publication place: United States
- Media type: Print
- Pages: 103 pp

Carver: A Life in Poems is a 1997 collection of poems written by the American poet Marilyn Nelson about George Washington Carver.

== Overview ==
Carver was an American inventor and educator; he was first born a slave in Diamond, Missouri, in about 1864. He lived with many struggles growing up while being raised by a white couple who owned his mother. Carver's life as a slave is described in poems written by those who once knew him during his lifetime, such as his friends and family all in one book.

The book was first published on April 23, 1997. It received positive reviews and was awarded with the John Newbery Medal. The author of the book, Marilyn Nelson, is an American award-winning writer. Nelson was born on April 26, 1946, in Cleveland, Ohio. She began writing in elementary school and attended the schools, the University of Minnesota and the University of Pennsylvania.

== Individual poems ==
- "Out of 'Slave's Ransom'" (Written by John Bentley): Moses Carver loses his slave-girl, Mary, and her son. Carver begs Bentley to find his slave-girl in exchange for a horse. Bentley later finds Mary and her son in Arkansas, and hands them to Mrs. Carver.
- "Prayer of the Ivory-Handed Knife" (Written by Susan Carver): Susan's father had given her Mary's orphans, Jim and George. Susan believed that the orphans would feel as though they were strangers. However, it wasn't until Susan got to know them that she was thankful to have them in her life.
- "Watkins Laundry and Apothecary" (Written by Mariah Watkins): Mariah takes in a ten-year-old child who attended her school for colored children. He has no mother and has only a handkerchief tied to a stick to his name. He is sweet to the neighborhood children and taught girls to crochet. Over time, the child grew and left to find a teacher “that knew more than he knew."
- "Drifter": A short poem on unanswered questions with hidden meaning, such as “why rain falls, what makes corn proud and squash so humble."
- "The Perceiving Self" (Written in Fort Scott, Kansas): A detailed description of the sighting of George Carver. Carver, “the music shaped and colored by brown lips, white teeth, pink tongue."
- "Washboard Wizard" (Written in Highland, Kansas 1885): Carver is talented when it comes to using the washboard, hence the title “Washboard Wizard.” It is said that he is very smart and was offered a scholarship to college. Even though he lives in poverty in a little shack, he was still “the best wash woman in town."
- "Old Settlers’ Reunion" (Written in Ness County, Kansas): After the narrator encounters Carver, Carver is said to have kept to himself. However, during the short time that he spent with Carver, Carver was always joyous and humble.
- “A Ship Without a Rudder” (Written by Helen Milholland): Helen had fallen in love with John at first sight at the church. The love became mutual, and Helen was confident with her decision to marry him.
- “The Prayer of Miss Budd” (Written in Simpson College, Iowa, 1890): A professor at Simpson College vents to God on a student she has become acquainted to. The student is a poor artist who “paints with such lostness." The professor prays for the ability to teach that talented painter.
- “The Last Rose of Summer”: Simple actions become pointless when Jim gets smallpox. “What good piano lessons paid for with paintings, what good a rosebud boutonniere if Jim your brother smallpox."

== Critical reception ==
Critics have found Carver: A Life in Poems to be a great portrayal of George Washington Carver's life. Nina Lindsay, of School Library Journal, found Carver: A Life in Poems to be “a beautiful and intricate interior biography of a man whom many readers will be familiar with from much drier introductions." Alison Follos, of School Library Journal, writes off Nelson's collection of Carver's poems to have “eloquent verses told in different voices that come together as a tight-knit documentary." "Marilyn Nelson has engaged the extraordinary George Washington Carver as a biographical subject in a book which renews our appreciation of his creative legacy."

== Awards ==
Newbery Medal Honor Book in 2002.

== See also ==
- Children's Literature
- Marilyn Nelson
