= Tana Hoban =

American writer

Tana Hoban (February 20, 1917 – January 27, 2006) was an American photographer and creator of children's books, including many picture books without any words.

== Early life and education ==
Tana Hoban was born in Philadelphia to Jeanette (Dimmerman) Hoban and Abraham T. Hoban, who were immigrants from Russia. She was the older sister of Freeda Hoban Ellis and children's book author and illustrator Russell Hoban . Abraham Hoban, an advertising manager for Jewish Daily World, enrolled Tana in art classes when she was very young. Hoban attended Upper Gwynedd Public School in Philadelphia and, after her family moved to Lansdale, Pennsylvania, she attended Lansdale High School. In 1938, she graduated from the School of Design for Women, now Moore College of Art and Design. That same year, she earned a fellowship to travel and study painting in Europe.

== Career ==
Back in the U.S. she married photographer Edward E. Gallob in 1939 (they divorced in 1982) and taught herself photography. She embarked on a career in commercial photography, and specialized in photographing children. She taught photography at the University of Pennsylvania from 1966 to 1969, and was a visiting lecturer across the country from 1974 to 1984.

Beginning in 1970, she wrote, designed, illustrated, and published more than 110 titles." Hoban created picture books out of photos that taught educational concepts such as signs and symbols, the alphabet, numbers, shapes, colors, animals, opposites, sizes, and prepositions. Her early books were in black and white, but later books are in color. Hoban began writing books after hearing about a project of the Bank Street School in New York City in which children were asked what they noticed on the way to school. After the children failed to describe or remember anything, teachers provided cameras, and children began paying attention to the world and discovering the extraordinary in the everyday. Hoban claims that this was her own inspiration: "What is there, right there where I'm standing that I'm not seeing?" She goes on to say "I try in my books to catch a fleeting moment and an emotion in a way that touches children....Through my photograph and through open eyes I try to say 'Look! There are shapes here and everywhere, things to count, colors to see, and always, surprises.'"

Hoban spent the last two decades of her life in Paris with her second husband, John G. Morris, a photo editor at The New York Times. She died in 2006 at a hospice in Louveciennes, France, outside Paris.

Some of Hoban's papers are archived at the University of Minnesota while other pieces are the University of Southern Mississippi.

== Selected works ==
- A, B, See! (1982, out of print)
- All About Where (1991)
- Animal, vegetable, or mineral? (1995)
- 'Big Ones, Little Ones' (1976, out of print)
- Black on White (1993)
- Black & White (2007)
- "Black White" (2017)
- A Children's Zoo (1985)
- "Circles, Triangles, and squares" (1974)
- "Colors Everywhere" (1995)
- Construction Zone (1997)
- "Count and See" (1972)
- Cubes, Cones, Cylinders & Spheres (2000)
- Dig, Drill, Dump, Fill (1975, out of print)
- Dots, Spots, Speckles, and Stripes (1987, out of print)
- Exactly the Opposite (1990)
- I Read Signs (1983)
- I Read Symbols (1983)
- I Walk and Read (1984, out of print)
- "I Wonder" (1999)
- Is It Larger? Is It Smaller? (1985)
- Is It Red? Is It Yellow? Is It Blue? (1978)
- Is It Rough? Is It Smooth? Is It Shiny? (1984)
- "Just Look" (1996)
- "Let's Count" (1999)
- "Look Again" (1971)
- Look! Look! Look! (1988. out of print)
- "Look Up, Look Down" (1992)
- "More, Fewer, Less" (1998)
- More Than One (1981, out of print)
- Of Colors and Things (1989)
- One Little Kitten (1979)
- 1, 2, 3 (1985, out of print)
- "Over, Under & Through" (1973)
- Panda, Panda (1986, out of print)
- Push, Pull, Empty, Full; A Book of Opposites (1972)
- Red, Blue, Yellow Shoe (1986, out of print)
- Round & Round & Round (1983, out of print)
- Shadows and Reflections (1990)
- "Shapes and Things" (1970)
- Shapes, Shapes, Shapes (1986)
- "So Many Circles, So Many Squares (1998)
- "Spirals, Curves, Fanshapes & Lines" (1992)
- Take Another Look (1981, out of print)
- 26 Letters and 99 Cents (1987)
- "What Is It?" (1985)
- What Is That? (1994)
- "Where Is It?" (1974)
- White on Black (1993)
- "Who Are They?" (1994)

== Awards ==
- Caldecott Honor, "One Little Kitten"
