= The Wall (children's book) =

2007 children's book by Peter Sís

The Wall: Growing Up Behind the Iron Curtain
- Front cover
- Author: Peter Sís
- Illustrator: Peter Sís
- Cover artist: Peter Sís
- Language: English
- Genre: Memoir, non-fiction
- Publisher: Farrar, Straus and Giroux
- Publication date: August 21, 2007
- Publication place: United States
- Media type: Print
- Pages: 56
- ISBN: 0-374-34701-8
- OCLC: 70839815
- Dewey Decimal: 943.704092 B 22
- LC Class: NC975.5.S57 A2 2007

The Wall: Growing Up Behind the Iron Curtain is a children's book written and illustrated by Peter Sís. It received both the American Library Association's Caldecott Honor and ALA's 2008 Robert Silbert Medal for the most distinguished informational book for young readers. It is a memoir on Sís's life under the Communist rule of Czechoslovakia, the oppression he faces and his dreams of leaving for America. The book mentions adult topics such as Laika, Prague Spring and Plastic People of the Universe. This book is about a boy who grew up on the Communist side of the Iron Curtain during the Cold War.
