= Lisa Graff =

American teen and children's book writer (born 1981)

- Born: January 10, 1981 (age 45); United States
- Education: UCLA, New School
- Occupation: Writer
- Writing career
- Genre: Children's fiction
- Notable works: A Tangle of Knots, Lost in the Sun; Ever Expending Universe series as Isla Neal
- Website: www.lisagraff.com

Lisa Colleen Graff (also known under the pen name of Isla Neal, born January 10, 1981) is an American teen and children's book writer. Her books have been included in state awards lists and best books of the years lists.

== Biography ==
Lisa Graff was born in 1981 and grew up in Big Bear, California. She started writing her first story (The Strangest Flower) at the age of 8, one day when she was bored. As a child she was interested in Math and Science.

She studied at University of California, Los Angeles. While Graff has always written stories, she only started considering writing as a career at her junior year in college, during an exchange program in Italy, when her language professor helped her translate one of her stories to Italian.

Following graduation, Graff moved to New York and graduated with a Master of Fine Arts in Creative Writing for Children from the New School University in New York.

She has worked for five years as an associate editor at Farrar, Straus & Giroux Books for Young Readers before turning to writing full-time. Graff now lives in Pennsylvania.

Graff's books have been included in more than 40 state award lists as well as listed in some best books of the year by various booksellers and librarians.

In 2013, her book "A Tangle of Knots" was long listed for the National book award. It was also chosen as one of the best children books of 2013 on Amazon.

In 2015, her book "Lost in the Sun" was chosen as one of the best books of 2015 by Amazon.

Graff also writes for teens under the pen name of Isla Neal.

She is also an adjunct professor teaching a course about children's literature at McDaniel College in Maryland.

== Books ==
=== Children and middle grade books ===
- (2007) The Thing About Georgie
- (2008) The Life and Crimes of Bernetta Wallflower
- (2009) Umbrella Summer
- (2010) Sophie Simon Solves Them All
- (2012) Double Dog Dare
- (2013) A Tangle of Knots- Chosen as one of the best books of 2013 by Amazon. also long listed for the National Book Award and other awards.
- (2014) Absolutely Almost
- (2015) Lost in the Sun - Chosen as one of the best books of 2015 by Amazon and other awards.
- (2016) A Clatter of Jars
- (2017) The Great Treehouse War
- (2024) Rewind

=== Picture books ===
- (2016) It Is Not Time for Sleeping
- (2021) Mr. Walker Steps Out

=== Short stories ===
- (2017) Funny Girl - collection of stories by female children's writers, Graff wrote one of the stories.

=== Books under the pen name Isla Neal ===
Neal wrote the Ever Expending Universe series with Martin Leicht:

- (2012) Mothership
- (2013) A Stranger Thing
- (2015) The World Forgot
