= Lynne Jonell =

American children's books author

Lynne Jonell is an American children's books author. She lives in Plymouth, Minnesota.

Her book The Secret of Zoom was chosen by School Library Journal as a best book of 2009, and in 2010, President Barack Obama purchased the book for his daughter.

== Bibliography ==
=== Picture books ===
- Mommy Go Away!, Putnam Juvenile, 1997
- I Need a Snake, Putnam Juvenile, 1998
- It’s My Birthday, Too!, Putnam Juvenile, 1999
- Bravemole, Putnam Juvenile, 2000
- Let’s Play Rough!, Putnam Juvenile, 2000
- Mom Pie, Putnam Juvenile, 2001
- When Mommy Was Mad, Putnam Juvenile, 2002

=== Novels ===
- Emmy and the Incredible Shrinking Rat, Henry Holt and Co., 2007
- Emmy and the Home for Troubled Girls, Henry Holt and Co., 2008
- The Secret of Zoom, Henry Holt and Co., 2009
- Emmy and the Rats in the Belfry, Henry Holt and Co., 2011
- The Sign of the Cat, Henry Holt and Co., 2015
- Time Sight, Henry Holt and Co., 2019

=== Chapter books ===
- Hamster Magic, Random House Books for Young Readers, 2010
- Lawn Mower Magic, Random House Books for Young Readers, 2012
