= Starred review =

Book review denotation of quality

A starred review is a book review marked with a star to denote a book of distinction or particularly high quality. A starred review can help to increase media coverage, bookstore placement and sales of a book.

Outlets that published starred reviews include:

- Booklist
- The Bulletin of the Center for Children's Books
- The Horn Book Magazine
- Kirkus Reviews
- Library Journal
- School Library Journal
- Publishers Weekly
- Shelf Awareness
