= Shelf Awareness =

American e-zine publisher (2005-)

- Trade name: Shelf Awareness
- Company type: Private
- Industry: publishing industry
- Founded: 2005; 20 years ago
- Founders: Jenn Risko; John Mutter
- Headquarters: Seattle, United States
- Number of employees: 16 (2025)
- Website: www.shelf-awareness.com

Shelf Awareness Pro
- Editor: John Mutter (editor-in-chief)
- Categories: Book reviews, trade publications
- Frequency: Daily
- Publisher: Matt Baldacci
- First issue: June 29, 2005; 20 years ago
- Website: shelf-awareness.com/booktrade.html

Shelf Awareness
- Editor: John Mutter (editor-in-chief)
- Categories: Book reviews, trade publications
- Frequency: Weekly
- Publisher: Matt Baldacci
- First issue: June 17, 2011; 14 years ago
- Website: shelf-awareness.com/sar-issue.html

Shelf Awareness is an American publishing company that produces two e-zines focused on bookselling, books, and book reviews: Shelf Awareness is aimed at general consumers, while Shelf Awareness Pro caters for industry professionals.

== History ==
The company was co-founded by editor/journalist John Mutter (editor-in-chief) and Jenn Risko (publisher) in 2005 to produce a trade magazine for booksellers.

In 2007, Shelf Awareness had 10,000 subscribers in the book industry subscribers. In partnership with Unshelved, which was read by 35,000 librarians and others, the company started running a new service for publishers to communicate with their readers, via a searchable online database of "drop-in" titles (also known as crash or add-in titles).

In 2011, Shelf Awareness launched a consumer book review version called Shelf Awareness for Readers. The company hired Marilyn Dahl as the review editor and Jennifer Brown as the children's literature editor. In November of that year, Kristen Steenbeeke of Hugo House writing centre wrote in her "Weekly Reading Website" section that Shelf Awareness had "been getting lots of buzz in the literary world", and that it provided "straightforward, obvious descriptions [of books] that tell you exactly what you came to read: Should I or should I not read this book?".

In 2014, the circulation of Shelf Awareness Pro (also called Shelf Awareness for the Book Trade) was more than 39,000 industry professionals (including booksellers, publishers, librarians, and literary agents) in 2014. The publication reports on independent bookstores, including openings, expansions, moves, staffing and closures; bookselling; publishing industry news, such as new titles, staffing, imprints, etc.; e-books and e-publication; authors; awards; media coverage of books and authors; and other features.

In 2014, Shelf Awareness for Readers was published twice weekly (Tuesdays and Fridays), and had a circulation of 399,000, at which time around 130 independent bookstores were sending out a version of Shelf Awareness for Readers to their customers.

== Overview ==
With offices in Seattle, Washington, and Montclair, New Jersey, Shelf Awareness publishes an e-zine for the book industry and an e-zine for general readers, both free of charge. Shelf Awareness Pro is a daily trade magazine for booksellers, publishers, librarians, and literary agents. Shelf Awareness is a weekly ezine published on Fridays, and includes the "25 best books of the week, as chosen by booksellers, librarians and other industry experts".

As of April 2025, John Mutter is editor-in-chief of Shelf Awareness, while Neil Strandberg, who joined in 2015, is CEO. Matt Baldacci is the publisher (Jenn Risko being publisher emerita, having left the company in 2024).
