= Jennifer Cody =

American dancer and actress (born 1969)

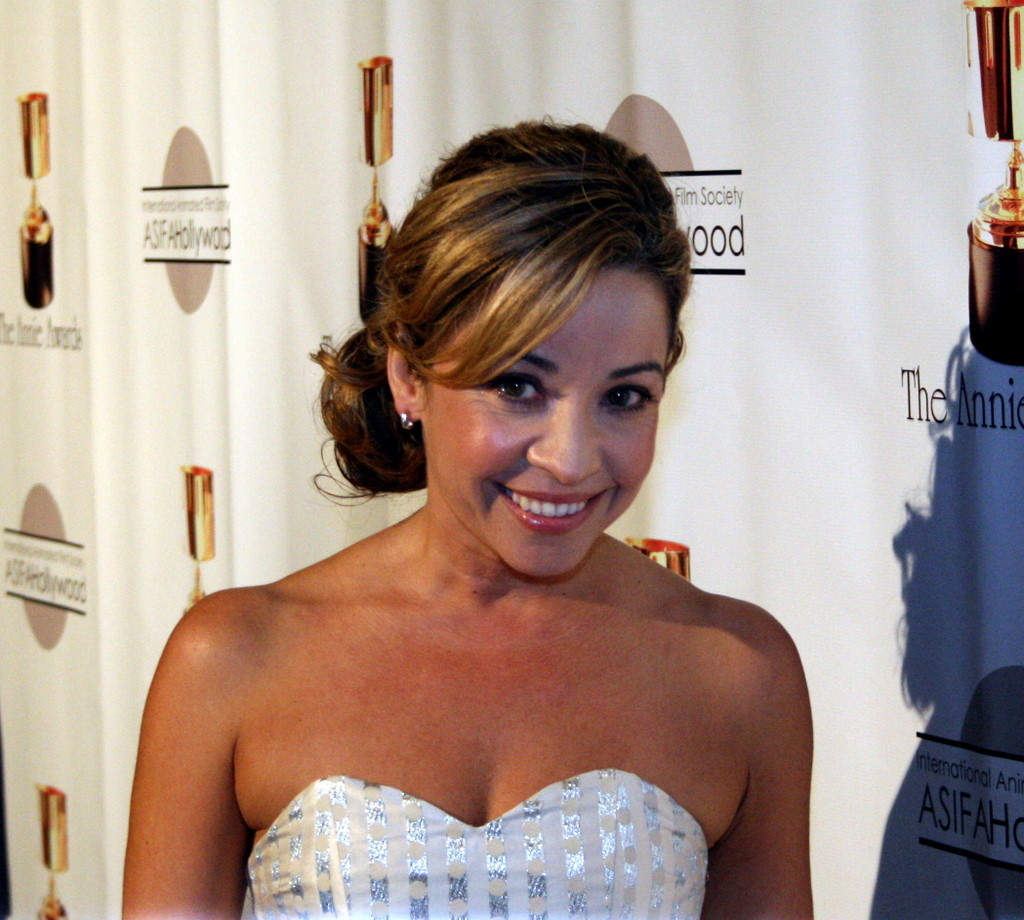
- Cody in 2010
- Born: November 10, 1969 (age 56); Greece, New York, U.S.
- Education: Fredonia State University (BFA)
- Occupations: Actress; dancer
- Years active: 1977–present
- Spouse: Hunter Foster (m. 1998)
- Relatives: Sutton Foster (sister-in-law)

Jennifer Cody (born November 10, 1969) is an American actress and dancer.

== Personal life ==
Cody was born on November 10, 1969, in Greece, New York. She began dancing at an early age. She studied acting at Fredonia State University, graduating with a Bachelor of Fine Arts. She and her husband, actor and occasional co-star Hunter Foster, lived in Teaneck, New Jersey, and since moved to New York City, where they live with their two dogs, both Shih Tzus.

== Stage ==
Her career began as Dainty June in the touring production of Gypsy immediately after graduating from college. She then began her stage career on Broadway as a replacement in the Andrew Lloyd Webber musical Cats in the role of Rumpleteazer (after touring with the production). She was featured in Grease as Cha-Cha (replacement), Beauty and the Beast as a Silly Girl (replacement), Seussical (as Cat's Helper and Ensemble) (2000), Urinetown (2001), Taboo (2003), and The Pajama Game (as Poopsie) (2006). She performed as the Shoemaker's Elf and other characters in the original Broadway cast of Shrek The Musical, which starred sister-in-law Sutton Foster, from November 2008 through July 14, 2009.

She performed Off-Broadway in the Manhattan Theatre Club production of the Andrew Lippa musical The Wild Party (as Mae) in 2000. Cody appeared in the role of Annie in the musical version of the children's book Henry and Mudge in 2006 at the Lucille Lortel Theatre and received a Drama League Award nomination. She played Junie B. in Junie B. Jones in 2008 at the Lucille Lortel Theatre. She also played Betty in the staged concert of No, No, Nanette at New York City Center Encores! in 2008 opposite Sandy Duncan and Mara Davi.

In regional theatre, Cody performed at the Paper Mill Playhouse in Milburn, New Jersey, as the wicked stepsister Joy in the musical Cinderella in October 2005 to December 2005 and as Hildy in On The Town in November and December 2009. Cody appeared at the Cape Playhouse (Dennis, Massachusetts) in productions of Lend Me a Tenor (as Maggie) in 2007, Moon Over Buffalo in 2009 (as Rosalind) with Gary Beach, John Scherer and her husband, Hunter Foster. and appeared in The Odd Couple in June 2014 as one of the Pigeon sisters with Michael McGrath and Noah Racey. This cast had performed The Odd Couple at the Geva Theatre Center in Cody's hometown of Rochester, New York, in April and May of that year. Cody played roles in Oklahoma! (as Ado Annie) and Into the Woods (2009) (as Little Red) at the Pittsburgh Civic Light Opera. At the Ogunquit Playhouse (Ogunquit, Maine) Cody played Natalie Haller in All Shook Up opposite Sally Struthers in 2009 and appeared in Damn Yankees as Gloria in 2012.

In addition to her role in The Odd Couple, Cody's hometown regional theater, Geva Theatre Center, has seen her play Patsy in Spamalot, Mary in the world premiere of Women in Jeopardy!, and the title character (a labradoodle) in Sylvia.

She performed at the Sacramento Music Circus, starring in productions of West Side Story, Bye Bye Birdie, A Chorus Line, 42nd Street and Oklahoma! as Ado Annie in 2004.

=== Charity ===
Cody has been a part of Broadway Bares, a benefit show to raise money and awareness for Broadway Cares/Equity Fights AIDS (BC/EFA). Cody and Don Richard frequently appear at events such as Rosie Live and the Annual BC/EFA Easter Bonnet Competition as their characters from Urinetown, the Musical. For example, in the April 2011 Easter Bonnet competition, "And after a two-year absence, Jen Cody and Don Richard returned to the Easter Bonnet stage as crowd favorites Officer Lockstock and Little Sally. Before their five minutes were up nearly all of Broadway had been toasted and roasted with their own special recipe of hilarious and occasionally jaw-dropping love and affection."

Cody was seen as Linda Lou in the Actors Fund of America benefit concert of The Best Little Whorehouse in Texas on October 6, 2006.

== Film ==
Cody voiced Charlotte La Bouff in the Disney animated film The Princess and the Frog (2009), for which she won an Annie Award. She voiced Fifi the Zebra in the Triggerfish Studio animation film Khumba (2013).

== Television ==
She was featured on the Law & Order episode "Crimebusters", which was televised in 2009, as Vicki Sandusky. Cody was a series regular on the short-lived CBS television show Untitled Paul Reiser Project (2006), playing Clarissa Ruiz. She also provides the voice of Darcy and Roxy's mother Morgana on the Nickelodeon version of Winx Club.

== Recordings ==
She can be heard on the cast albums of Andrew Lippa's The Wild Party (2000), Vincent Youmans's Through The Years (2001), The Pajama Game, with Harry Connick Jr. and Kelli O'Hara, Shrek The Musical with Sutton Foster and Brian d'Arcy James (2009), Taboo and Seussical.

== Awards and nominations ==
- For her work on The Princess and the Frog, Cody won an Annie Award for Outstanding Voice Acting in a Feature Production.
- She received a Drama League Award nomination for her work in the Off-Broadway musical Henry and Mudge by Bree Lowdermilk and Kait Kerrigan.
- Cody received a Kevin Kline Award for Outstanding Supporting Actress in 2008, in the role of Minnie Fay in The Muny (St. Louis) production of Hello, Dolly!.
