= Fly Guy =

Fly Guy may refer to:

- Fly Guy (video game), a 2002 flash game created by Trevor van Meter
- Fly Guy (book series), a series of children's books by Tedd Arnold
- Fly Guy, an enemy in the Mario franchise
