= Ron Marshall =

Ron Marshall may refer to:

- Ron Marshall (footballer) (1915–2001), Australian footballer
- Ron Marshall (politician), American politician, member of the Montana House of Representatives
- Ron Marshall (actor), narrator of the Scholastic version of No Jumping on the Bed!
