= The Woman Upstairs =

The Woman Upstairs may refer to:

- The Woman Upstairs (film), a 1921 British film directed by Fred Paul
- The Woman Upstairs (musical), a 2004 off-Broadway musical
- The Woman Upstairs (novel), by Claire Messud
