= Parts (book) =

1997 children's picture book by Tedd Arnold

The cover of Parts, written and illustrated by Tedd Arnold

Parts is a children's book written and illustrated by Tedd Arnold. It was first published on September 1, 1997. Written in rhyme with cartoon-like watercolor illustrations, Parts is the first in Arnold's trilogy on the theme of body parts. It was followed by More Parts in 2001 and Even More Parts in 2004. In 1998, it won the "Tellable" Stories for Ages 4–7 Award (Storytelling World) and in 1999, the Colorado Children's Book Award.

== Plot summary ==
The story is aimed at 4-7 year-olds. It was inspired by a real life experience, when the author's young son, Walter, was disturbed by losing his first tooth. The protagonist of Parts is young Chip Block, who notices that some of his hairs remain on his comb, lint is appearing in his navel, his skin is peeling, and a piece of mucus (which he assumes is a piece of his brain) falls out of his nose. His anxiety reaches its peak when he discovers one of his teeth is coming loose. Convinced that he is falling apart and will soon become toothless, skinless, brainless, and bald, the boy tries to hold himself together with his father's masking tape until he resembles a mummy. Finding him wrapped in the masking tape, his parents then explain to him about how parts of his body renew themselves.

== Sequels ==
=== More Parts ===
This sequel to Parts was first published in 2001. Like its predecessor, the story is aimed at 4-7 year olds, written in rhyme and illustrated by the author. Chip from Parts now becomes frightened by his literal interpretation of the idiomatic expressions involving body parts that he hears adults using. Imagining that these expressions could lead to his body falling apart (his central preoccupation in Parts), Chip invents various kinds of protection for himself. For example, when his father asks him "to give a hand", he glues gloves to his hands to keep them from coming off his arms. Other expressions covered in the story include:

- "It’s sure to crack you up."
- "Stretch your legs."
- "Hold your tongue."
- "Scream your lungs out."

=== Even More Parts ===
This final book in Arnold's trilogy was published in 2004, and is again illustrated by him. Unlike its two predecessors, Even More Parts is not, strictly speaking, a narrative and is not written in rhyme. Aimed at children 4-8, it is an introduction to the use of idioms or figures of speech in language, and more specifically to the use of idioms involving body parts. The protagonist is Chip from the first two books of the series, his name is revealed as – Chip. Chip has compiled a list of all the worrying and mystifying things he has heard from adults, and makes himself a suit of armour to protect him while he is at school. The remainder of the book is an illustrated list of the sayings that have puzzled him. For example, one page shows the students' eyeballs flying out of the children's eye sockets hitting the teacher when she says, "I want all eyes on me." The illustrations often feature minor characters from the previous books – Chip's toy superhero, dinosaur and tank.

== Bibliographic information ==
- Tedd Arnold, Parts, New York: Dial Books for Young Readers, 1997. Written and Illustrated by Tedd Arnold, 32 pages. ISBN 0-8037-2040-8
- Tedd Arnold, More Parts, New York: Dial Books for Young Readers, 2001. Written and Illustrated by Tedd Arnold, 32 pages. ISBN 0-14-250149-2
- Tedd Arnold, Even More Parts: Idioms from Head to Toe, New York: Dial Books for Young Readers, 2004. Written and Illustrated by Tedd Arnold, 40 pages. ISBN 0-8037-2938-3

(Other editions of these books have been published by Puffin and Scholastic Inc.)

=== Puffin Versions ===
- The first book mentioning the titles on the back cover No Jumping on the Bed! and Green Wilma
- The second book mentioning the title on the back cover as the illustrator of Giant Children
- No titles mentioned on the back cover of the third book

== Notes and references ==
- Fredericks, Anthony D., Much More Social Studies Through Children's Literature: A Collaborative Approach Libraries Unlimited, 2007, pp. 43–45. ISBN 1-59158-445-0
- Hopkins, Gary, Review: Parts, Education World, 1998.
- Keller, James, The Big Book of Picture-Book Authors & Illustrators, Scholastic, 2001. ISBN 0-439-20154-3
- McElmeel, Sharron L., Children's Authors and Illustrators Too Good to Miss: Biographical Sketches and Bibliographies, Libraries Unlimited, 2004, pp. 6–10. ISBN 1-59158-027-7
