= Maryland Blue Crab Young Reader Award =

Literature award

The Maryland Blue Crab Young Reader Award is a literature award created to recognize high-quality books for beginning and transitional readers in kindergarten through fourth grade. It is granted annually by the Maryland Library Association's Children's Services Division (CSD). The Children's Services Division initiated the award in 2004 as a means of identifying and promoting the best fiction and nonfiction books for beginning readers. The further intention in granting the award is to provide teachers, librarians, and caregivers with a resource list of excellent books for beginning readers, and to encourage publishers, authors, and illustrators to create high-quality, interesting, and beautiful books that will entice young readers.

== Selection process ==
The Award is decided by a committee made up of public librarians and school media specialists who examine qualifying literature published within the calendar year. The committee considers criteria such as legibility, vocabulary, visual and literary appeal, support matter (i.e. glossaries or pronunciation keys) and appropriateness to the needs of beginning readers. The committee selects one title each to receive the award in each of the following categories:

- Beginning Fiction
- Beginning Nonfiction
- Transitional Fiction
- Transitional Nonfiction

In addition, the committee generates an honor list of up to three titles for each reading level the award covers. Books that the committee feels are especially appropriate for reluctant older readers are indicated.

Anyone working in a Maryland public library, and members of the Maryland Library Association (MLA), the Maryland Association of School Librarians (MASL), or the Maryland State Education Association (MSEA), may nominate titles for the award. Eligibility guidelines and nomination forms are listed on the Blue Crab page of the Maryland Library Association website.

As of 2012, winners will be announced at the spring CSD Southern/Western Conferences in March and April, respectively. Prior to this year, winners were announced in October at the fall "Kids Are Customers, Too" conference. A Blue Crab Award author is frequently invited to speak at either the annual Maryland Library Association Conference in the spring or the Kids Are Customers, Too conference in the fall.

== Blue Crab Book Award winners ==
Year	Beginning Fiction	Beginning Nonfiction	Transitional Fiction	Transitional Nonfiction
2004	See Pip Point by David Milgrim	Hunting Sharks by Kristin Nelson	Stuart Goes to School by Sara Pennypacker	Gretchen the Bicycle Dog by Anita Heyman
2005	Baa-Choo! by Sarah Weeks	Platypus! by Ginjer Clarke	Down Girl and Sit: Smarter than Squirrels by Lucy Nolan	Choppers! by Susan E.Goodman and Michael Doolittle
2006	Hi! Fly Guy! by Tedd Arnold	Chameleon, Chameleon by Joy Cowley photographs by Nic Bishop	The Next-Door Dogs by Colby Rodowsky illustrated by Amy June Bates	Turtle Tide: The Way of Sea Turtles by Stephen Swinburne illustrated by Bruce Hiscock
2007	Dirk Bones And The Mystery of The Haunted House by Doug Cushman	Emperor Penguins by Patricia Trattles	Pirate Mom by Deborah Underwood illustrated by Stephen Gilpin	Time for Kids: Butterflies! by David Bjerklie
2008	My Friend is Sad by Mo Willems	Best Friends: The True Story of Owen and Mzee by Roberta Edwards illustrated by Carol Schwartz	Abracadabra! Magic with Mouse and Mole by Wong Herbert Yee	Who Likes the Rain? by Etta Kaner illustrated by Marie Lafrance
2009	Annie and Simon by Catharine O'Neill	Wolfsnail: A Backyard Predator by Sarah C. Campbell photographed by Sarah C. Campbell and Richard P. Campbell	Keena Ford and the Second-Grade Mix-Up by Melissa Thomson illustrated by Frank Morrison	Our Three Bears by Ron Hirschi photographed by Thomas Mangelsen
2010	Good Dog, Aggie by Lori Ries illustrated by Frank W. Dormer	My People by Langston Hughes and Charles R. Smith, Jr.	How Oliver Olson Changed the World by Claudia Mills illustrated by Heather Maione	Never Smile at a Monkey: and 17 Other Important Things to Remember written and illustrated by Steve Jenkins
2011	We Are In a Book! written and illustrated by Mo Willems	Just One Bite Written by Lola Schaefer, illustrated by Geoff Waring.	Lulu and the Brontosaurus by Judith Viorst illustrated by Lane Smith	Pika: Life on the Rocks Written by Tannis Bill; Photographs by Jim Jacobson
2012	Max Spaniel: Best in Show written and illustrated by David Catrow	Capybara Written by Anita Ganeri	Labracadabra by Jessie Nelson and Karen Leigh Hopkins	Dolphins Written by Kate Riggs
2013	The Fly Flew In; Written and illustrated by David Catrow	Welcome to the World, ZooBorns! by Andrew Bleiman and Chris Eastland	The Three Ninja Pigs by Corey Rosen Schwartz illustrated by Dan Santat	Dreaming Up Written and illustrated by Christy Hale
2014	The Watermelon Seed by Greg Pizzoli	How Long? Crazy Ways to Compare Length byJessica Gunderson	Odd Duck by Cecil Castellucci	Miracle Mud by David A. Kelly
2015	My New Friend is So Fun by Mo Willems	Sea Otters by Margo Gates	Pigsticks and Harold and the Incredible Journey by Alex Milway	Handle with Care: An Unusual Butterfly Journey by Loree Griffin Burns and Ellen Harasimowicz
2016	What This Story Needs is a Pig in a Wig by Emma J. Virján	Water is Water by Miranda Paul	Francine Poulet Meets the Ghost Raccoon by Kate DiCamillo	Fur, Fins and Feathers: Abrahan Dee Bartlett and the Invention of the Modern Zoo by Cassandre Maxwell
2017	Duck, Duck, Porcupine! by Saline Yoon	Plants Can't Sit Still by Rebecca E. Hirsch	Weekends with Max and His Dad by Linda Urban; illustrated by Katie Kath	Whoosh! Lonnie Johnson's Super-Soaking Stream of Inventions by Chris Barton; illustrated by Don Tate
2018	Life on Mars by Jon Agee	Ants Rule: The Long and Short of It by Bob Barner	Wedgie & Gizmo by Suzanne Selfors; illustrated by Barbara Fisinger	If Sharks Disappeared by Lily Williams
2019	Pizza Pig by Diana Murray; illustrated by Maria Karipidou	Mapping Sam by Joyce Hesselberth	Jasmine Toguchi, Drummer Girl by Debbi Michiko Florence; illustrated by Elizabet Vukovic	The Sun is Kind of a Big Deal by Nick Seluk
2020	Birthday on Mars! by Sara Schonfeld; illustrated by Andrew J. Ross	What is a Refugee? by Elise Gravel	Rumple Buttercup: A Story of Bananas, Belonging, & Being Yourself by Matthew Gray Gubler	Sisters: Venus & Serena Williams by Jeanette Winter
2021	Arlo & Pip: King of the Birds by Elise Gravel	My Stinky Summer by S. Bug by Paul Meisel	Kindy Kim and the Yummy Seaweed Business by Lyla Lee	Small Matters: The Hidden Power of the Unseen by Heather Ferranti Kinser
2022	Thunder and Cluck Series: Friends Do Not Eat Friends by Jill Esbau,	Let's Pop, Pop, Popcorn by Cynthia Schumerth	J.D. and the Great Barber Battle by J. Dillard	She Persisted: Claudette Colvin by Lesa Cline-Ransom
2023	I'm a Unicorn by Helen Yoon	A Seed Grows by Antoinette Portis	Frank and the Bad Surprise by Martha Brockenbrough and Jon Lau	Blood! Not Just a Vampire Drink by Stacy McAnulty and Shawna J. C Tenney
2024	How to Love a Pony by Michelle Meadows and Sawyer Cloud	You Are a Raccoon! by Laurie Ann Thompson and Jay Fleck	The Case of the Missing Tarts by Christee Curran-Bauer	Butt or Face? by Kari Lavelle
2025	Pencil & Eraser : We Have a Dull-emma! by Jenny Alvarado	How to Bird by Rasha Hamid	Bodega Cats : Picture Purrfect by Hilda Eunice Burgos and Siara Faison	How to Explain Robotics to a Grown-Up by Ruth Shapiro; illustrated by Teresa Martínez
2026	The Fire-Breathing Duckling by Frank Cammuso	Polar Babies by Maya Myers	The Truth About the Tooth Fairy by Leah Cypress	The Urban Owls: How Flaco and Friends Made the City Their Home by Christopher Cooper and Cristen Adam
