= Geisel Award =

American literary award for beginning readers

- Awarded for: "the most distinguished American book for beginning readers"
- Country: United States
- Presented by: Association for Library Service to Children (ALSC), a division of the American Library Association
- First award: 2006
- Website: ALSC award website

The Theodor Seuss Geisel Award (commonly abbreviated as the Geisel Award) is a literary award by the American Library Association (ALA) that annually recognizes the "author(s) and illustrator(s) of the most distinguished book for beginning readers published in English in the United States during the preceding year." The winner(s) receive a bronze medal at the ALA Annual Conference, presented by the Association for Library Service to Children (ALSC) division of ALA.

The award is named for Theodor Geisel, also known as Dr. Seuss, who once said, "Children want the same things we want: to laugh, to be challenged, to be entertained and delighted." It was established in 2004 and inaugurated in 2006 for 2005 publications.

A few runners up are termed Theodor Seuss Geisel Honor Books; their authors and illustrators receive certificates.

== Criteria ==
- The book must encourage and support the beginning reader.
- The book must be published in English in the United States during the preceding year.
- There are no limitations as to the character of the book considered except that it will be original and function successfully as a book for beginning readers.
- The author(s) or illustrator(s) must be citizens or residents of the United States.
- The "author(s) and illustrator(s)" may include co-authors and co-illustrators. The author(s) and illustrator(s) may be awarded the medal posthumously.
- The text must be directed at readers from pre-K through Grade 2.
- The illustrations must function as keys or clues to the text.
- Fiction, non-fiction, and poetry are all eligible.
- Reprints and compilations are not eligible.
- Subject matter must be intriguing enough to motivate the child to read.
- The book may or may not include short "chapters."
- New words should be added slowly enough to make learning them a positive experience.
- Words should be repeated to ensure knowledge retention.
- Sentences must be simple and straightforward.
- There must be a minimum of 24 pages.
- Books may not be longer than 96 pages.
- The illustrations must demonstrate the story being told.
- The book creates a successful reading experience, from start to finish.
- The plot advances from one page to the next and creates a "page-turning" dynamic.

== Recipients ==
Geisel Award Winners and Honors
Year	Author	Illustrator	Title	Citation
2006	Cynthia Rylant	Suçie Stevenson	Henry and Mudge and the Great Grandpas	Winner
2006	Tedd Arnold	Tedd Arnold	Hi! Fly Guy	Honor
2006	Suzanne Bloom	Suzanne Bloom	A Splendid Friend, Indeed	Honor
2006	Erica Silverman	Betsy Lewin	Cowgirl Kate and Cocoa	Honor
2006	Jean Van Leeuwen	Ann Schweninger	Amanda Pig and the Really Hot Day	Honor
2007	Laura McGee Kvasnosky	Laura McGee Kvasnosky	Zelda and Ivy: The Runaways	Winner
2007	Kate DiCamillo	Chris Van Dusen (illustrator)	Mercy Watson Goes for a Ride	Honor
2007	Karen Beaumont	Jane Dyer	Move Over, Rover!	Honor
2007	Antoinette Portis	Antoinette Portis	Not a Box	Honor
2008	Mo Willems	Mo Willems	There is a Bird on Your Head!	Winner
2008	Laura Vaccaro Seeger	Laura Vaccaro Seeger	First the Egg	Honor
2008	Darrin Lunde	Patricia J. Wynne	Hello, Bumblebee Bat	Honor
2008	Lisa Wheeler	R. Gregory Christie	Jazz Baby	Honor
2008	April Pulley Sayre	Steve Jenkins	Vulture View	Honor
2009	Mo Willems	Mo Willems	Are You Ready to Play Outside?	Winner
2009	Judyann Ackerman Grant	Sue Truesdell	Chicken Said, ‘Cluck!'	Honor
2009	Laura Vaccaro Seeger	Laura Vaccaro Seeger	One Boy	Honor
2009	Eleanor Davis	Eleanor Davis	Stinky	Honor
2009	Sarah C. Campbell	Sarah C. Campbell and Richard P. Campbell	Wolfsnail: A Backyard Predator	Honor
2010	Geoffrey Hayes	Geoffrey Hayes	Benny and Penny in the Big No-No!	Winner
2010	Tedd Arnold	Tedd Arnold	I Spy Fly Guy!	Honor
2010	Jeff Smith	Jeff Smith	Little Mouse Gets Ready	Honor
2010	Wong Herbert Yee	Wong Herbert Yee	Mouse and Mole: Fine Feathered Friends	Honor
2010	Kate McMullan	R. W. Alley	Pearl and Wagner: One Funny Day	Honor
2011	Kate DiCamillo and Alison McGhee	Tony Fucile	Bink & Gollie	Winner
2011	Grace Lin	Grace Lin	Ling and Ting: Not Exactly the Same!	Honor
2011	Mo Willems	Mo Willems	We Are in a Book!	Honor
2012	Josh Schneider	Josh Schneider	Tales for Very Picky Eaters	Winner
2012	Mo Willems	Mo Willems	I Broke My Trunk	Honor
2012	Jon Klassen	Jon Klassen	I Want My Hat Back	Honor
2012	Paul Meisel	Paul Meisel	See Me Run	Honor
2013	Ethan Long	Ethan Long	Up, Tall and High!	Winner
2013	Mo Willems	Mo Willems	Let's Go for a Drive!	Honor
2013	Eric Litwin	James Dean	Pete the Cat and His Four Groovy Buttons	Honor
2013	Cece Bell	Cece Bell	Rabbit & Robot: The Sleepover	Honor
2014	Greg Pizzoli	Greg Pizzoli	The Watermelon Seed	Winner
2014	Mary Sullivan	Mary Sullivan	Ball	Honor
2014	Mo Willems	Mo Willems	A Big Guy Took My Ball!	Honor
2014	Kevin Henkes	Kevin Henkes	Penny and Her Marble	Honor
2015	Anna Kang	Christopher Weyant	You Are (Not) Small	Winner
2015	Cynthia Rylant	Arthur Howard	Mr. Putter & Tabby Turn the Page	Honor
2015	Mo Willems	Mo Willems	Waiting Is Not Easy!	Honor
2016	David A. Adler	Sam Ricks	Don’t Throw It to Mo!	Winner
2016	Jonathan Fenske	Jonathan Fenske	A Pig, a Fox, and a Box	Honor
2016	Kevin Henkes	Kevin Henkes	Waiting	Honor
2016	Stephen Savage	Stephen Savage	Supertruck	Honor
2017	Laurie Keller	Laurie Keller	We Are Growing!	Winner
2017	Greg Pizzoli	Greg Pizzoli	Good Night Owl	Honor
2017	Mike Twohy	Mike Twohy	Oops, Pounce, Quick, Run! An Alphabet Caper	Honor
2017	David Milgrim	David Milgrim	Go Otto Go!	Honor
2017	Kara LaReau	Matt Myers	The Infamous Ratsos	Honor
2018	Laurel Snyder	Emily Hughes	Charlie & Mouse	Winner
2018	Paul Meisel	Paul Meisel	I See a Cat	Honor
2018	Dori Hillestad Butler	Nancy Meyers	King & Kayla and the Case of the Missing Dog Treats	Honor
2018	Salina Yoon	Salina Yoon	My Kite Is Stuck! And Other Stories	Honor
2018	Tedd Arnold, Martha Hamilton, and Mitch Weiss	Tedd Arnold	Noodleheads See the Future	Honor
2018	Tina Kügler	Tina Kügler	Snail & Worm Again	Honor
2019	Corey R. Tabor	Corey R. Tabor	Fox the Tiger	Winner
2019	David Milgrim	David Milgrim	The Adventures of Otto: See Pip Flap	Honor
2019	Dori Hillestad Butler	Nancy Meyers	King & Kayla and the Case of the Lost Tooth	Honor
2019	Sergio Ruzzier	Sergio Ruzzier	Fox + Chick: The Party and Other Stories	Honor
2019	Emily Tetri	Emily Tetri	Tiger vs. Nightmare	Honor
2020	James Yang	James Yang	Stop! Bot!	Winner
2020	Cece Bell	Cece Bell	Chick and Brain: Smell My Foot!	Honor
2020	J.E. Morris	J.E. Morris	Flubby Is Not a Good Pet!	Honor
2020	Greg Pizzoli	Greg Pizzoli	The Book Hog	Honor
2021	David LaRochelle	Mike Wohnoutka	See the Cat: Three Stories About a Dog	Winner
2021	Maya Tatsukawa	Maya Tatsukawa	The Bear in My Family	Honor
2021	Starling Lyons	Nina Mata	Ty's Travels: Zip, Zoom!	Honor
2021	Ryan T. Higgins	Ryan T. Higgins	What About Worms!?	Honor
2021	Anne Hunter	Anne Hunter	Where's Baby?	Honor
2022	Corey R. Tabor	Corey R. Tabor	Fox at Night	Winner
2022	Jonathan Fenske	Jonathan Fenske	Nothing Fits a Dinosaur	Honor
2022	Joe Cepeda	Joe Cepeda	I Hop	Honor
2022	Norm Feuti	Norm Feuti	Beak & Alley: Unlikely Friends	Honor
2023	Michael Emberley	Michael Emberley	I Did It!	Winner
2023	Sergio Ruzzier	Sergio Ruzzier	Fish and Wave	Honor
2023	Melissa Iwai	Melissa Iwai	Gigi and Ojiji	Honor
2023	Vikram Madan	Vikram Madan	Owl and Penguin	Honor
2023	Antoinette Portis	Antoinette Portis	A Seed Grows	Honor
2024	Corey R. Tabor	Corey R. Tabor	Fox Has a Problem	Winner
2024	Jenn Bailey	Mika Song	Henry, Like Always	Honor
2024	Kaz Windness	Kaz Windness	Worm and Caterpillar Are Friends	Honor
2025	Ame Dyckman	Mark Teague	Vacation	Winner
2025	Corey R. Tabor	Corey R. Tabor	Fox versus Fox	Honor
2025	Jashar Awan	Jashar Awan	Towed by Toad	Honor
2026	Jonathan Fenske	Jonathan Fenske	Stop That Mop!	Winner
2026	Greg Pizzoli	Greg Pizzoli	Earl and Worm: The Big Mess and Other Stories	Honor
2026	Juwanda G. Ford	Jada Jeni Bennett	I Like Hoops	Honor
2026	Michael Rex	Michael Rex	The Tunneler Tunnels in the Tunnel	Honor

== Multiple awards ==
- Tedd Arnold received honors in 2006, 2010, and (with Martha Hamilton, and Mitch Weiss) 2018.
- Cece Bell received honors in 2013 and 2020.
- Dori Hillestad Butler received honors in 2018 and 2019.
- Kate DiCamillo won the 2011 award (with co-author Alison McGhee and illustrator Tony Fucile). She received an honor in 2007.
- Jonathan Fenske won the 2026 award. He received honors in 2016 and 2022.
- Kevin Henkes received honors in 2014 and 2016.
- Paul Meisel received honors in 2012 and 2018.
- David Milgrim received honors in 2017 and 2019.
- Greg Pizzoli won the 2014 award. He received honors in 2017, 2020, and 2026.
- Antoinette Portis received honors in 2007 and 2023.
- Sergio Ruzzier received honors in 2019 and 2023.
- Cynthia Rylant won the award in 2006 and received an honor in 2015.
- Laura Vaccaro Seeger received honors in 2008 and 2009.
- Corey R. Tabor won the award three times, in 2019, 2022, and 2024, and the honor in 2025.
- Mo Willems won the 2008 and 2009 awards. He received honors in 2011, 2012, 2013, 2014, and 2015.
