= Green (picture book) =

Book by Laura Vaccaro Seeger

- Author: Laura Vaccaro Seeger
- Illustrator: Laura Vaccaro Seeger
- Language: English
- Published: 2012 (Roaring Brook Press)/ Neal Porter Books
- Publication place: United States
- Media type: Print (Hardcover)
- Pages: 36
- ISBN: 978-1-59643-397-7

Green is a children's picture book by American author and artist Laura Vaccaro Seeger. It was first published in 2012 by Roaring Brook Press. The pages illustrate different shades of green in nature, with cut-out shapes linking the different scenes.

== Reception ==
Kirkus Reviews finds Green '...lovely, inventive, engrossing and interactive.' while Publishers Weekly concludes 'Here's hoping subsequent color books from Seeger get the green light.' Janice Harayda finds 'its romanticized green-is-good subtext borders on an environmental cliché.'

== Awards and honors ==
- A 2013 Caldecott Honor Book
- A Kirkus Reviews Best Children's Book of 2012
- A 2013 Bank Street College of Education Best Children's Book of the Year
- A 2013 Cooperative Children's Book Center Choice Book
- A 2013 International Board on Books for Young People Outstanding Book for Young People with Disabilities
- A 2013 International Reading Association Teachers' Choice
- A 2013 Capitol Choices Noteworthy Book for Children
- A 2013 American Library Association Notable Children's Book
- A New York Times best seller
- A Horn Book Fanfare Best Book of 2012
- A 2012 Booklist Editors' Choice: Books for Youth
- A Wall Street Journal Best Picture Book of 2012
- A 2012 New York Public Library Title for Reading and Sharing
- 2013 winner of the Giverny Award
