= Bree Lowdermilk =

American composer

Bree Lowdermilk (formerly Brian Lowdermilk) is an American musical theater composer and lyricist.

== Biography ==
In addition to writing music and lyrics, Lowdermilk is also a music director, arranger, vocal coach, and pianist. They are an alumnus of New York University and BMI theatre writing workshop.

Lowdermilk is best known for their collaboration with Kait Kerrigan. Their works together include shows such as The Bad Years, Republic, Unbound, Flash of Time, The Woman Upstairs, The Unauthorized Autobiography of Samantha Brown (revised in 2017 as The Mad Ones) (with Zach Altman) and Wrong Number. Lowdermilk and Kerrigan wrote TheatreworksUSA's adaptation of Henry and Mudge, which premiered Off-Broadway in 2006 at the Lucille Lortel Theatre, which is where they made their Off-Broadway debut. In one review of that piece, Lowdermilk and Kerrigan were called "perhaps the most important young writers in musical theatre today."

In 2011, Kerrigan and Lowdermilk released their first CD, "Our First Mistake". The CD was a result of fan support through a campaign on Kickstarter. To celebrate both the CD and their fans, Kerrigan-Lowdermilk launched a series of New York City concerts under the name You Made This Tour. A selection of recordings from these concerts was bundled for their follow-up album, "Kerrigan-Lowdermilk Live".

The pair made their London debut at the St James Theatre in February 2014 in a concert series produced by United Theatrical - a London-based theatrical production company run by Stuart Matthew Price and James Yeoburn. The featured singers included West End performers Rachel Tucker, Julie Atherton, Daniel Boys, Chloe Hart, Jodie Jacobs, Lauren Samuels and Anton Zetterholm.

== Personal life ==
On May 3, 2021, Lowdermilk came out as a transfeminine non-binary person and specified their pronouns as she/her or they/them.

== Works ==
- Battleship Ticonderoga (book by Bree Lowdermilk and Marcus Stevens)
- Cellular Passion
- Elliot and the Magic Bed (lyrics by Bree Lowdermilk and Marcus Stevens; book by Marcus Stevens)
- From Where I Stand
- Henry and Mudge (with Kait Kerrigan)
- Places You Never Called Home
- RED (lyrics by Bree Lowdermilk and Marcus Stevens; book by Marcus Stevens)
- Republic—opened off-Broadway in 2012 (with Kait Kerrigan)
- Room To Grow
- Transient Days (book by Zach Altman)
- The Unauthorized Autobiography of Samantha Brown (music and lyrics by Bree Lowdermilk; book and lyrics by Kait Kerrigan; additional book and concept by Zach Altman); (2009) is a musical written jointly by Kait Kerrigan and Lowdermilk. Kerrigan initially wrote the musical for an all student production at Barnard College but later re-worked the musical with the assistance of Lowdermilk for a wider audience. The plot involves the upcoming graduation of high school class valedictorian, Samantha, who must decide what she wants with her life and how her parents, her friends, and her boyfriend, Adam, fit into her life.
- Tales from the Bad Years (with Kait Kerrigan)
- Whatever It Takes (book by Bree Lowdermilk and Gary Sunshine; book by Gary Sunshine)
- The Woman Upstairs (with Kait Kerrigan)
- Wrong Number (with Kait Kerrigan)
- Our First Mistake (Kerrigan & Lowdermilk)
- The Mad Ones (a revised version The Unauthorized Biography of Samantha Brown)
- The Bad Years, an immersive house party musical set for an open-ended commercial production in New York City beginning in 2018.
- Justice (Lyrics by Kait Kerrigan; book by Lauren Gunderson)

== Awards ==
- 2004-2005 Dramatists Guild Fellowship
- 2005 Richard Rodgers Awards for Musical Theatre for Red with Marcus Stevens
- 2006 Larson Award for Henry and Mudge with Kait Kerrigan
