= Salina Yoon =

American author and illustrator (born 1972)

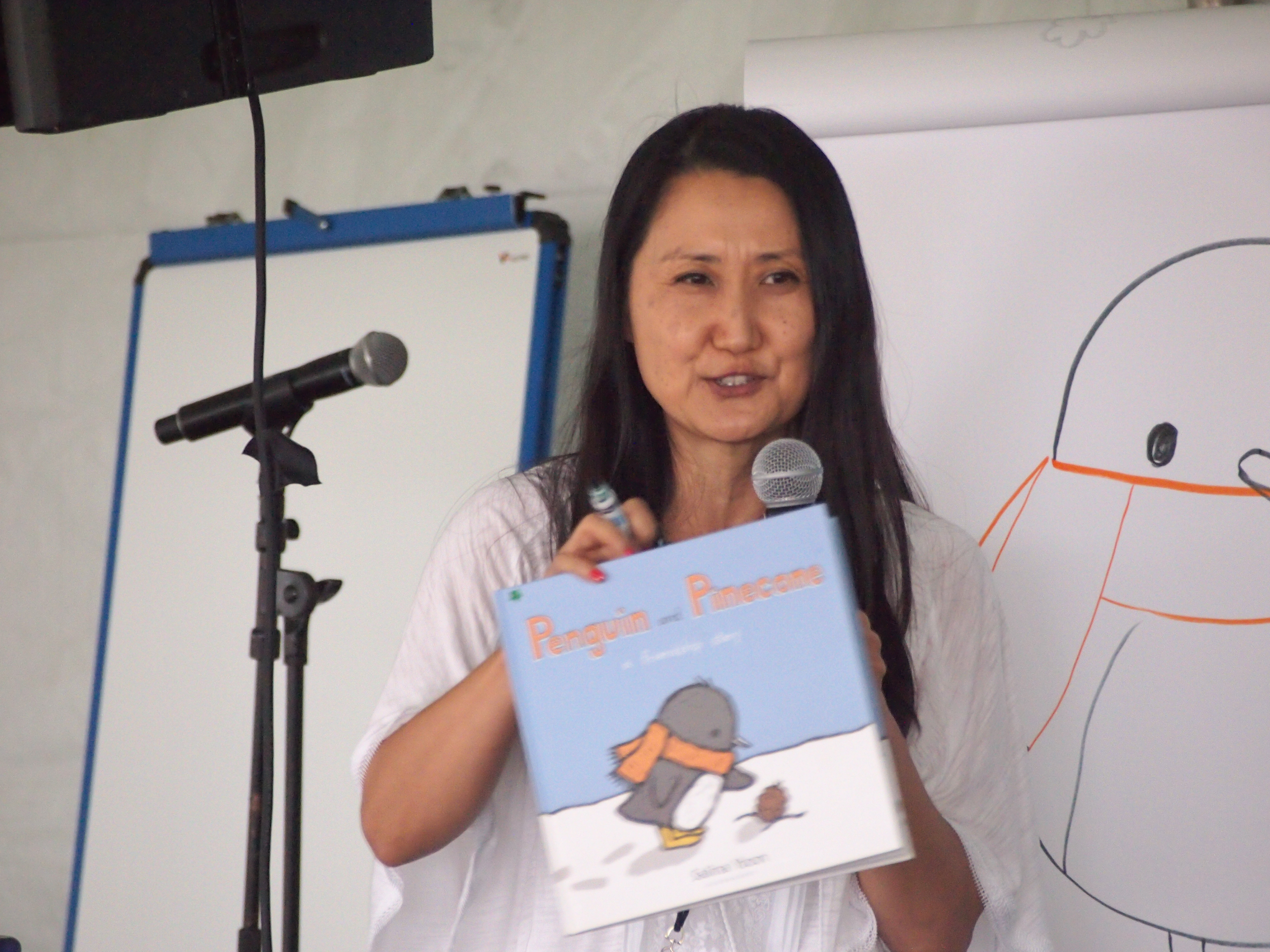
- Yoon reading Penguin and Pinecone at the 2017 Gaithersburg Book Festival
- Born: Yoon; 1972 (age 53–54); Busan, South Korea
- Education: California State University, Northridge; ArtCenter College of Design
- Occupation: Author • Illustrator
- Spouse: Chris Polentz
- Children: 2
- Website: www.salinayoon.com

Salina Yoon (born 1972) is an American author, illustrator, and designer of over 160 children's books including board books, novelty formats, and character-driven picture books. She is best known for her Penguin and Duck, Duck, Porcupine! series and received a 2018 Geisel Honor Book award for My Kite is Stuck! And Other Stories.

== Early life and education ==
Yoon was born in Busan, South Korea, and immigrated to the United States with her family at the age of four. She attended the Los Angeles County High School for the Arts and studied graphic design at California State University, Northridge. She later earned a degree in illustration from ArtCenter College of Design in Pasadena, California.

== Career ==
Yoon began her publishing career with novelty books and board books, where she combined her design background with early childhood literacy principles. She is credited with creating over 160 published titles, many of which feature tactile or interactive elements.

She gained widespread recognition for her Penguin series, beginning with Penguin and Pinecone (2012), followed by other titles such as Penguin on Vacation and Penguin and Penelope. Her Duck, Duck, Porcupine! series earned the 2018 Geisel Honor. In 2019, she collaborated with organizing consultant Marie Kondo on the picture book Kiki & Jax: The Life-Changing Magic of Friendship.

Her books have sold more than 4.5 million copies worldwide and have been translated into multiple languages.

== Themes and creative process ==
Yoon’s stories often explore emotional themes such as connection, identity, and belonging. Her book Found was inspired by her own childhood experiences and reflects themes of loss and attachment.

She describes her drafting process as puzzle-like and highly visual, using storyboards and multiple iterations to refine text and illustration.

== Awards and honors ==
- 2018 Geisel Honor Book – My Kite is Stuck! And Other Stories
- New York State Charlotte Award – Penguin and Pinecone
- Maryland Blue Crab Young Reader Award – Duck, Duck, Porcupine!
- Blue Ribbon Picture Book honor – Found

== Personal life ==
Yoon lives in San Diego, California, with her husband, graphic designer Chris Polentz, and their two sons. She has spoken at schools and libraries as part of her outreach work.

== Selected bibliography ==
=== Series ===
- Penguin series
  - Penguin and Pinecone (2012)
  - Penguin on Vacation (2013)
  - Penguin in Love (2014)
  - Penguin and Penelope (2022)
- Duck, Duck, Porcupine! series
  - Duck, Duck, Porcupine! (2016)
  - My Kite is Stuck! And Other Stories (2017)
  - That's My Book! And Other Stories (2018)

=== Other works ===
- Found (2014)
- Stormy Night (2015)
- Be a Friend (2016)
- Kiki & Jax: The Life-Changing Magic of Friendship (2019, with Marie Kondo)

== See also ==
- List of children's book illustrators
- Theodor Seuss Geisel Award
- Board book
