= Peter Mandel =

American author (born 1958)

Peter Mandel (born 1957) is an American journalist and children’s book author. Titles of his include Jackhammer Sam (Macmillan/Roaring Brook, 2011), Bun, Onion, Burger (Simon & Schuster, 2010), and Say Hey! A Song of Willie Mays (Hyperion/Jump at the Sun, 2000), one of the early picture books about African-American baseball stars from the 1960s, which was included in the Baseball As America exhibit at the National Baseball Hall of Fame and the Smithsonian.

Mandel is a travel journalist, and essayist. One of his Boston Globe articles won a gold Lowell Thomas award from The Society of American Travel Writers in 2005 for adventure travel article of the year. Articles of Mandel's for The Washington Post won bronze Lowell Thomas awards in 2003 and 2006.

== Biography ==
Son of Paul Mandel, a novelist and Life magazine editor, Mandel grew up in Manhattan, graduating from Middlebury College and Brown University.

He lives now in Providence, Rhode Island with his wife, Kathryn Byrd Mandel.

== Works ==
=== Journalism ===
A contributor to the travel sections of The Washington Post, The Boston Globe, and The Huffington Post, Mandel’s essays for The Wall Street Journal, The Philadelphia Inquirer, The Chicago Tribune and other newspapers examine technology and contemporary trends.

=== Children's books ===
Mandel's picture books for young children tend to be simple texts with only a few rhyming or rhythmic phrases per page. Zoo Ah-Choooo, illustrated by Elwood Smith (Holiday House, 2012), fits this template, adding exaggerated animal sounds into the mix. "Gusty splatters and loud, boisterous sneezes can't lose with the preschool set,” said Kirkus Reviews. His picture book, Jackhammer Sam (Macmillan/Roaring Brook, 2011), picks up on the sound of a pneumatic drill, something Mandel recalls from growing up in Manhattan’s Chelsea neighborhood. "If a new Walt Whitman broke up sidewalks with a jackhammer, this is exactly what his 'Song of Myself' would be," wrote Mary Harris Russell in her review for The Chicago Tribune. "Like New York City itself, Sam is wonderful and overwhelming, rattling and mesmerizing," said Publishers Weekly in the magazine's 2011 review. Mandel’s Bun, Onion, Burger (Simon & Schuster, 2010) was named a Summer 2010 Children's Indie Next Pick by the American Booksellers Association, and the equally simple Red Cat White Cat, illustrated by Clare Mackie (Henry Holt, 1994), was an American Bookseller Pick of the Lists and received a starred review in Kirkus. Say Hey! A Song of Willie Mays (Hyperion/ Jump at the Sun, 2000) was selected for The Jump at the Sun Treasury: An African American Picture Book Collection (Hyperion/Jump at the Sun, 2001) and was included in the Baseball As America exhibit curated by the National Baseball Hall of Fame as an example of baseball in popular culture. One of the early titles for young children about African-American baseball players from the 1960s, Say Hey! was followed by several picture books including Hank Aaron: Brave in Every Way by Peter Golenbock (Harcourt, 2001) and Roberto Clemente: Pride of the Pittsburgh Pirates by Jonah Winter (Atheneum, 2008).

- The Official Cat I.Q. Test, illustrated by June Otani (HarperCollins, 1991). ISBN 0060965924, ISBN 978-0060965921
- The Cat Dictionary, illustrated by Annette Busse (Penguin, 1994). ISBN 0140246614, ISBN 978-0140246612
- Red Cat White Cat, illustrated by Clare Mackie (Henry Holt, 1994). ISBN 080502929X, ISBN 978-0805029291
- Say Hey! A Song of Willie Mays, illustrated by Don Tate (Hyperion/Jump at the Sun, 2000). ISBN 0786804807, ISBN 978-0786804801
- My Ocean Liner: Across the North Atlantic on the Great Ship Normandie, illustrated by Betsey MacDonald (Stemmer House, 2000). ISBN 0880451491, ISBN 978-0880451499
- The Jump at the Sun Treasury: An African American Picture Book Collection (Hyperion/Jump at the Sun, 2001). ISBN 0786807547, ISBN 978-0786807543
- Planes at the Airport, illustrated by Edward Miller (Scholastic/Cartwheel, 2004). ISBN 0439564166, ISBN 978-0439564168
- Boats on the River, illustrated by Edward Miller (Scholastic/Cartwheel, 2004). ISBN 0439564158, ISBN 978-0439564151
- Bun, Onion, Burger, illustrated by Chris Eliopoulos (Simon & Schuster, 2010). ISBN 1416924663, ISBN 978-1416924661
- Jackhammer Sam, illustrated by David Catrow (Macmillan/Roaring Brook, 2011). ISBN 1596430346, ISBN 978-1596430341
- Zoo Ah-Choooo, illustrated by Elwood Smith (Holiday House, 2012). ISBN 0823423174, ISBN 978-0823423170

=== Other works ===
Three articles of Mandel's, from The Washington Post and The Baltimore Sun, were included in the 2015 anthology of travel journalism, Adventures of a Lifetime: Travel Tales from Around the World.

An essay by Mandel, "An American Cat in Paris," was included in the 1999 anthology, Chicken Soup for the Cat & Dog Lover's Soul, and reprinted in the 2008 anthology, Chicken Soup for the Soul: Loving Our Cats.

He contributed a brief autobiographical chapter and recipe to the 2006 anthology Authors in the Pantry.
