= Hi! Fly Guy =

2006 children's book by Tedd Arnold

- Author: Tedd Arnold
- Illustrator: Tedd Arnold
- Series: Fly Guy
- Publication date: 2006
- Media type: Print
- Awards: Geisel Award; Maryland Blue Crab Young Reader Award

Hi! Fly Guy is the first book in the Fly Guy children's picture book series, which is about a fly named Fly Guy and his owner Buzz. It was written and illustrated by Tedd Arnold and published in 2006.

== Awards and nominations ==
Year	Award	Category	Result	Ref(s)
2006	Theodor Seuss Geisel Award	—N/a	Honor	
2006	Maryland Blue Crab Young Reader Award	Beginning Fiction	Won	
