= Gil (comic strip) =

Comic strip by Norm Feuti

Retail
- Author(s): Norm Feuti
- Website: Gil
- Current status/schedule: Sunday Only
- Launch date: January 2, 2012; 13 years ago
- Syndicate(s): King Features Syndicate

Gil is a syndicated comic strip written and illustrated by the American cartoonist Norm Feuti. It is distributed by King Features Syndicate.

On 2 December 2013, Feuti announced that Gil would cease publication at the end of the year. However, on May 11, 2014, Feuti announced that Gil would return as a Sunday-only comic in the Providence Journal. On January 1, 2023, Feuti announced that the Providence Journal decided to stop carrying the feature at the end of 2022.

== Setting ==
Gil the title character, is a chubby elementary school student who is usually picked last in school for sports. He lives with his divorced factory working mother Cheryl. Gil prefers instead to live in a nuclear family, thinking it would give him superpowers. He is shown visiting his father Frank every week.

== Cast ==
Gil A chubby and cheerful eight-year-old boy, who loves comic books, video games and superheroes. He is an only child who lives with his mother and visits his father on alternate weekends.

Shandra Gil's best friend, neighbor, and classmate. Shandra's parents also are divorced. She has signature puffy pigtails and a very sensible attitude. She is a loyal friend and a very supportive confidante.

Cheryl Gil's mom is a very hardworking single mother who works full-time in a factory.

Frank Gil's dad is shown to be a lazy underachiever.

Morgan is Gil's mean-spirited classmate and antagonist.

Troy Cheryl's boyfriend

Voltron Gil and Cheryl's cat

Mr. Klopec Gil's neighbor, who usually is seen on the porch of the apartment building
