= Emma J. Virján =

American author

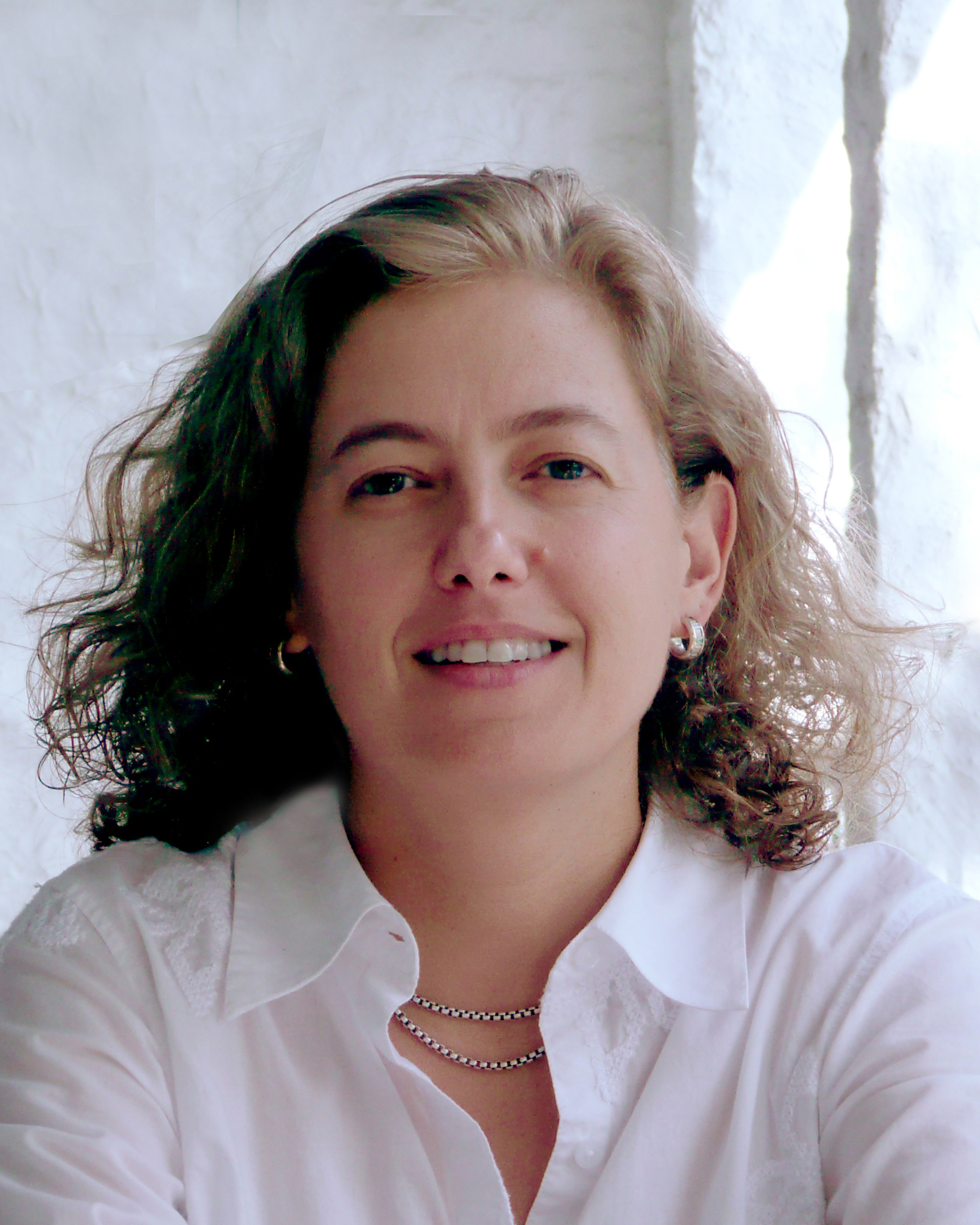
- Born: San Antonio, Texas, U.S.
- Occupations: Author, Illustrator
- Notable work: What This Story Needs is a Pig in a Wig, Nacho the Party Puppy
- Website: emmavirjan.com

Emma J. Virján is an American author and illustrator of children's picture books. Books in her Pig in a Wig series have been included in the 2016 New York Public Library's Best Books for Kids and the Texas 2x2 Reading List; and won awards including the Maryland Blue Crab Young Reader Award.

Publishers Weekly gave a starred review to the opening book of Virján's Pig in a Wig series, stating “In a story with the echoes of Seuss and Willems, Virján offers a very funny lesson about the unreliability of narrators.” And Kirkus Reviews concluded “A boatload of giggles will keep the reader returning for more easy-to-read fun.”

== Biography ==
Virján was born in San Antonio, Texas. She earned a Bachelor of Fine Arts in Communication Arts from Texas State University, and is currently based in Austin.

== Books ==
- Nacho the Party Puppy (Random House Books for Young Readers, 2008)
- What This Story Needs is a Pig in a Wig (HarperCollins, 2015)
- What This Story Needs is a Hush and a Shush (HarperCollins, 2016)
- What This Story Needs is a Munch and a Crunch (HarperCollins, 2016)
- What This Story Needs is a Bang and a Clang (HarperCollins, 2017)
