= Retail (comic strip) =

2006–2020 syndicated comic strip distributed by King Features Syndicate

- Logo
- Author: Norm Feuti
- Website: retailcomics.com
- Current status/schedule: Ended
- Launch date: January 1, 2006
- End date: February 23, 2020
- Syndicate(s): King Features Syndicate
- Publisher: Hyperion

Retail is a syndicated comic strip distributed by King Features Syndicate. It was authored and illustrated by Norm Feuti. It ran in newspapers from 2006 to 2020, and throughout its run gained quickly in popularity following articles in The New York Times and TIME Magazine. In January 2020, Feuti announced that he planned to end the strip in order to focus on his career as a children's book author. The last strip was published on February 23, 2020.

== Setting ==
The strip is set in store #4743 of a fictional department store chain called "Grumbel's." Grumbel's provides a wide array of goods; customers have been shown shopping for anything from garden equipment and electronics to clothing and housewares. Given the wide variety of products available through Grumbel's it more closely resembles a Sears than other types of retail stores. However, the name Grumbel's is a parody of real life department store Gimbels, which closed in 1987. It also suggests the word "grumble."

Besides being in a generic, suburban mall the location of Grumbel's was initially kept ambiguous. Grumbel's has been operating at least since the mid-1900s and was founded by the fictional J.P. Grumbel, as seen in one of the comic strips. January 10, 2010, it was revealed that this Grumbel's store is located in New England.

Following years of declining sales under incompetent senior executive management, Grumbels filed for bankruptcy in January 2020, leading to the events at the end the strip.

== Cast ==
=== Marla Garrison (née Masters) ===
First appearance: January 1, 2006

Marla, a brunette woman in her late 30s, is originally Grumbel's assistant manager, later store manager, and the main character of the strip. She is good at her job and cited as a reasonable manager, but is often discouraged when the bureaucratic rules set by the corporate office work against the store's stated goal of customer service. While the daily strips' plots often deal with her discouragement, Marla maintains an optimistic attitude and often mentions a dream of opening her own small store or boutique. She vents her frustration by writing a retail manifesto railing against the idiocies of customers and management, which at last mention had grown to 200 pages. She made plans to start her own retail business, but was determined to keep this secret at work for fear of being fired by the management. However, Marla put this ambition on hiatus to support her young daughter and family.

Marla and her fiancé Scott were married in June 2011. Their first child, a daughter named Fiona Jane Garrison was born on April 9, 2012. Marla was promoted to store manager in March 2012 after Stuart accepted a promotion to district manager.

At the end of the strip, Marla is seen accepting a position as an office manager for a company named Myers-Peterson. With that secure, Marla called over Stuart to tender her immediate resignation with a recommendation that Crystal replace her for the liquidation. Marla also informed Stuart that she had already advised Crystal about appropriate pay demands and that most of the store staff had already resigned.

=== Cooper Costello ===
First appearance: January 1, 2006

Cooper is an Italian-American man who works in Grumbel's stockroom and is the store's clown. His attitude made him a regular antagonist to Stuart while Stuart was store manager, and later to Josh when Josh was promoted to assistant manager. He is constantly frustrated by bad policies and customers, and regularly lashes out at the store by goofing off during his work hours and playing practical jokes. He is often the one most directly affected by retail management policies such as the lack of employer health-care programs and the erratic amount of part-time hours. He was nearly fired as a cost-cutting measure but was able to stay on when Lunker offered to cut his hours in half. To make ends meet, he worked part-time (in addition to Grumbel's) as an attendant at a gas station mini-mart, although he later left this second position. In July 2013, Cooper is promoted to stockroom supervisor, a position that comes with full-time hours, a raised salary, and benefits. As part of his new duties, Cooper does initial interviews for a new stockroom employee.

In 2018, Cooper is assigned as acting store manager of the closing South Heights Grumbels store by Stuart, choosing him only because Marla refused to oversee that store on top of her own without her salary being doubled in the interim and then she recommended Cooper instead. Considering that the closest other qualified manager lives 73 miles away, Stuart has no other choice. Despite the frustrations of Grumbels' usual corporate incompetence, Cooper finds this temporary responsibility a good experience considering that he is not only advancing his career, but he also does not have to concern himself in this situation with sustaining the operation with profit margins in mind. The store closed on June 28, and Cooper was shocked to receive Stuart's congratulations for a job well done, complete with a promise to provide the closing cash bonus as previously negotiated.

Cooper has built a small lounge on the roof of the Grumbel's out of old patio furniture dubbed "Cooper's Lounge" and also spends time constructing "Box Art" out of empty cardboard boxes. Some examples of his art include robots, castles, mazes and even a "Great Wall of Boxes." He's a fan of science fiction and geek culture, and often wears Halloween costumes based on obscure movie, TV or comic book characters that other staff members don't recognize, much to Cooper's frustration. Cooper harbored a crush on Val for years before finally asking her on a date in February 2011. They got along far better than either of them expected, and they remained in a romantic relationship. On 3 August 2018 Cooper proposes to Val having bought a ring from the bonus received for supervising the store closure. With that, they were later quietly married at a courtroom.

At the end of the strip, Cooper accepted a new job as an entry-level warehouse worker, thanks to a lead provided by an employee he supervised during the store closure. Despite being an entry-level position, the new job paid almost twice his Grumbel's salary. This allowed his wife Val to stay at home and focus on her novel rather than looking for a new job.

Stuart makes a presentation in which Josh, Val, Marla and Cooper are visible seated in the front row of the first panel.

=== Val Costello (née Williams) ===
First appearance: January 1, 2006

Val Williams is an African-American department supervisor in her mid-30s and good friend of Marla. She is also a published creative writer and would eventually like to quit working at Grumbel's and write full-time. In Halloween 2008, a week of strips focused on a short story she had written. In October 2011, it is revealed that she has had limited success with her writing. She keeps her job a secret to her family, who pay for her living expenses so long as they believe she is an accomplished writer. In 2012, Val finally admitted to her father that her writing career was not as successful as she was letting on, and that she had only recently accepted a blogging position for a gardening magazine. In response, her father stopped paying her way, and Val moved to a small but well-maintained studio apartment. Soon after, she and Cooper moved in together and eventually eloped.

In January 2020, Val announced that she intended to write a novel that year. Following the announcement of Grumbels' upcoming bankruptcy at the end of the strip, Val decided to take a break from wage employment to focus on her novel-writing goal, supported by her husband Cooper's increased salary.

=== Stuart Suchet ===
First appearance: January 1, 2006

Stuart Suchet (his last name is pronounced "soo-shay", like the British newsreader John Suchet or the actor David Suchet) is originally the store manager, and is later promoted to district manager. Often viewed by his employees as an incompetent and arrogant tyrant, he is a "corporate yes man" who implements any instructions sent from the corporate office -- no matter how absurd or ill-considered -- without question. He has a working relationship with Marla (which has become more strained as the strip has progressed), and relied heavily on her to complete his managerial work and keep the employees' morale up while he was store manager. He also has an even more tense relationship with Cooper who treats him in open contempt, often calling him "Zucchini Head."

Stuart further demonstrated his incompetence and arrogance in July 2009 when, following her vacation, he threatened to replace Marla with Josh as assistant manager. He even went so far as to have both Josh and Marla interview for the position, although Josh declined and left him in a tough spot. Stuart accepted a promotion to district manager in February 2012, and began the position after Marla returned from her maternity leave, which proved a delicate matter after he was foolish enough to frame that legally entitled right as "vacation" to Marla's face to her outrage. Although he initially wished to give his store manager position to Josh, the regional manager persuaded him to give it to Marla. Much to Marla's chagrin, his office is located in his old store.

At the end of the strip, Stuart was frustrated and astounded that Marla would quit on him with no notice.

=== Lunker ===
First appearance: April 9, 2007 (first mentioned) April 11, 2007 (first full appearance)

Lunker is Cooper's co-worker in the Grumbel's stockroom. His real name is Mel and, according to Cooper, he is "bald, about 7 feet tall, all around huge and only slightly more articulate than the Hulk." Cooper took immediate liking to Lunker, as he has "chaos potential." Lunker has shown brief moments of unexpected intelligence or insight, often during downtime when Cooper is in one of his melodramatic moods. He is very loyal towards Cooper going so far as to stand up for him when Cooper was going to be fired as a cost-saving measure, offering to personally cut his hours so Cooper could stay on.

Lunker and Crystal were friends in middle school and lived in the same apartment complex. They had not seen each other for many years until meeting again when Crystal became assistant manager at Grumbels. Lunker did not take on his nickname until after he and Crystal lost touch.

A recurring gag in the strip is to show Lunker singing and dancing when nobody is watching, only to be interrupted by a surprised coworker who is intimidated into silence by a threat from Lunker.

At the end of the strip, Lunker offered to stay on at Grumbels during the bankruptcy liquidation to support the assistant manager and his childhood friend Crystal, who was expecting to be promoted to manager following Marla's upcoming departure.

=== District Managers ===
In February 2012, Stuart accepted a promotion from store manager to district manager and he remained in that position until the end of the strip. Before that happened, the strip featured a series of characters in the district manager role:

Jerry Deco Jerry was initially the district manager in the strip, who was even more obsessed with rules than Stuart. He is a source of great frustration for Marla, who he constantly calls "Darla". While his demeanor may reflect problems in his personal life (as revealed in a November 2007 story arc where he was in a middle of a divorce), the way he took it out on the employees of the stores in his district earned him little (if any) sympathy.

Jerry was written out in May 2008 when he was promoted to a regional position. Much to Marla's horror, he was brought back in May 2009 when Gary was fired. Jerry left Grumbel's in May 2012, naming Stuart as his successor.

Connie Connie replaced Jerry as the district manager after he first departed the role. She is portrayed as much more reasonable and understanding than Jerry, leading to surprise from Marla and Val that someone "human" could be in upper management. Connie left her position a year later when she accepted a job in another company.

Gary Gary replaced Connie as the new district manager. In his few appearances he is shown as more focused on the rules than Connie, though less so than Jerry. After watching Marla and Stuart bicker and attempt to undermine the other, he assigned them to a weekly management communication seminar. Gary was abruptly fired and replaced in May 2009 upon Jerry's return, and his seminars were discontinued.

=== Assistant Managers ===
In March 2012, Marla accepted a promotion from assistant manager to store manager after Stuart was promoted to district manager, and she remained in that position until the end of the strip. After that happened, the strip featured a series of characters in the assistant manager role:

Josh Tobin Josh was hired as temporary Christmas help in October 2007. Marla hired him from a pool of otherwise incompetent applicants for Christmas positions, since he appeared to be the perfect employee: his application was correctly filled out, he showed up for his interview and performed well, and his references were good (if a little foreboding). However, Marla and the rest of the employees quickly discovered that Josh is determined to be the perfect retail worker and that he is fond of pointing out the policy violations (and other flaws) of his fellow employees. Stuart, of course, bonded quickly with Josh and considered him potential management material.

In spite of the other staff members' blatant dislike of Josh and their best efforts to have him fired, Josh cheerfully accepted an offer from Stuart for a permanent position at Grumbel's in January 2008. After being promoted to shift supervisor in January 2012, Josh replaced Marla as assistant store manager when Stuart became district manager and Marla was promoted to store manager. In late 2013, Josh told Stuart and Marla that Delman's offered him a job with higher salary. After Stuart gave him a raise, Marla discovered that Josh was never offered a job and lied about it. Realizing that he was caught, Josh accepted a job at another company. He gave Marla his two-weeks notice in early 2014, but after he admitted that he lied about the Delman's offer, Marla fired him on the spot, not letting him work out the notice.

Arthur Arthur was hired in February 2014, replacing Josh as Marla's assistant manager. He previously worked as a department supervisor at another Grumbels store in Stuart's area, and was happy with this promotion for the simple reason it would give him a shorter commute. One of the three assistant manager candidates recommended to Marla by Stuart. In spite of being one of Stuart's selection, he was liked by the other employees, including Marla. Arthur's outlook on retail is the same as Marla, even having his own manifesto. In March 2016, he left the store after accepting another job from his brother-in-law.

Brice Tanner Brice Tanner was Marla's third assistant manager and was hired in April 2016, replacing Arthur. Stuart's personal recommendation of Brice allowed him to be on the short list of candidates for assistant manager. He started to work at Grumbels while he was in business school and wanted to become a district manager like Stuart and work in the corporate office. Originally a department supervisor from the Southbridge store, a Grumbels located in a high income area, Brice believed that following the rules will result in meeting the goals set out by corporate. At first he appeared to be like Stuart and Josh; who wouldn't question anything from the corporate office and believing that you shouldn't cut corners no matter what happens with payroll.

While conflicts between seeing how corporate treats other stores started to influence his perspective, the main issues he had during his time as assistant manager was being at odds with Marla's management style. Marla believes treating employees fairly would help out in the long run, while he believed that employees should remain loyal to Grumbels no matter what happens. As such, the staff comes to loathe him as an authoritarian jerk who treats them like peons with brusque orders and impractical nitpicking with workplace rules. However, unlike Josh, Brice is always strictly Marla's subordinate, and she is able to directly order him to be more diplomatic with the staff, leaving him unable to understand why he is considered in the wrong by everyone at work. However, Brice also grows increasingly disgusted with Stuart's petty arrogance at work, even if Brice didn't immediately realize he shares those flaws himself.

It was this conflict that caused him to leave Grumbels and work at Delman's in the same mall with Mina as store manager after her assistant manager quit. However, when he started working at Delman's, he noticed how toxic Mina was to her employees and to him. After running into Marla at chance in the mall, Brice admitted how bad Mina was and that it was a mistake it was to leave Grumbels. Marla placed a call to Stuart about offering Brice the store manager job at the New Hampshire store, in which Stuart was temporary running as management was fired due to embezzlement. At first, Stuart did not want to talk with Brice since he left to Delman's but also insulted Marla's management style (Stuart claims he was defending the chain of command) but as Stuart was desperate for anyone he offered Brice the store manager job. When Mina found out about him talking with Stuart, Brice walked out on her and quit Delman's without notice in July 2017.

Crystal Crystal was Marla's fourth and final assistant manager at Grumbel's, replacing Brice Tanner.

Crystal was originally interviewed a year prior as a possible replacement for Arthur, but Marla had to settle on Brice instead because he was more qualified. When Brice left, however, Marla had no one else to fall back on. Crystal, in spite of her counter-cultural beliefs, was the only other person who had any retail management experience, having worked as an assistant manager at the Pewter and Incense store for 6 months before they closed down.

Unlike Marla's previous assistants, Stuart had no hand in her getting hired, not even interviewing her, as he was too busy trying to replace all the managers that were let go for embezzlement at another store in his district. Marla noted the irony that Stuart decided to trust her instinct the one time she had to pick someone out of desperation.

At the end of the strip, Crystal was expecting to be promoted to store manager once Marla stated her intention to leave, and was uncertain how she would manage the responsibility and stress, but Mel (aka Lunker) promised to stay through the liquidation to make sure she did well.

=== Other characters ===
Alan Zimmerman Alan manages the shoe department and is good friends with Cooper, although, as confirmed in October 2009, they did not know each other's last names until Cooper's girlfriend Zoe pointed it out to him.

Craig Craig is the head of the electronics department at Grumbel's, and a friend to Cooper. He was briefly let go when store cut back on payroll but has since been rehired.

Courtney Courtney works as a cashier. She is lazy, ditzy, incompetent, and constantly rude to customers. It has been hinted that she was hired largely because of her looks, and she avoided being fired on one occasion chiefly because she isn't paid as well as other store workers. She is one of Marla's sources of frustration (besides Stuart), and has even gone as far to blackmail her for Friday nights and Saturday mornings off. When Marla took over as store manager, she campaigned to make Courtney's employment as miserable as possible, a revenge Courtney did not take kindly to. In the June 2, 2013 strip, when she bluntly refused without justification to follow her work schedule to Marla's face, she was fired from Grumbel's. On the June 19, 2013 strip, it was revealed that she had found a new job at the mall coffee shop, still bitterly resentful to the staff of Grumbel's.

Keith Sanzen Keith was added to the line up in October 2007. He got his job in the shoe department by contacting Cooper through Cooper's Blog. After starting work at Grumbel's, Cooper discovered that Keith had made a blog that copies his format exactly, hence driving a wedge between these two former friends. Eventually, Cooper hacked into Keith's computer and infected it with a virus. Keith held a grudge, and in April 2008, was able to get his revenge when he discovered Cooper's secret lounge on the roof of the mall, and started blackmailing him by making him give total access to the lounge. Within few days, Keith has converted the lounge into "Keith's Poetry Perch." Realizing that he has no other way of beating him, Cooper reluctantly called the police and Keith was arrested for holding a poetry slam on the roof. As a result, Keith was banned from the mall. Despite this, Keith vows vengeance on Cooper when he "least expects it."

Keith reappeared in the June 2, 2014 strip as the supervisor of the inventory company assisting Marla with the annual inventory. It was explained that his ban from the mall was only for 5 years.

Keith is the first character known to be based solely on a real person (the second being Charles Brubaker on June 8, 2008). The real Keith Sanzen is a fan of the strip who won a contest on Cooper's Retail Blog.

Mrs. Masters Mrs. Masters' is Marla's mother. She is an understanding mother to her daughter, but frequently frustrates her with her inability to understand many of the inconveniences Marla experiences. A running joke in the strip is Marla's mother asking her to run out and buy something during holidays, which annoys Marla due to her belief that business shouldn't make their employees work then.

Scott Garrison Scott is Marla's husband. He is a bartender at Dave's Carousing Cantina in the same mall as Grumbel's. They met after Val insisted Marla spend an evening out with her in February 2007. Marla feared that Cooper ruined her chances with Scott when he spilled the news that she liked him during a visit to Dave's. Fortunately, Scott liked Marla too, and the two were shown as a dating couple in occasional strips since that time. After pressure from Marla to make a commitment to their future together, Scott proposed in May 2010. They were married in June 2011, and had their first daughter in April 2012.

Warren Warren is the buck-toothed mall security guard. His job is to make sure that the stores and the employees in the mall follow all mall regulations to the letter, although he would often prefer to hang out with Cooper than do his job. He regularly rides on a Segway scooter, that has been stolen and vandalized on multiple occasions.

Jasper Morley (deceased) Stuart's former manager, who died seven years earlier when he choked on a Clucky Chicken sandwich. He reappeared as a ghost in front of Stuart, revealing that he is forced to walk on Earth for all eternity wearing a chain of Grumbel's Policy and Procedure Manuals.

Zoe A barista at the mall cafe who has an uncanny resemblance to Marla (with blonde hair). Marla denies seeing any resemblance, although she was creeped out when Cooper asked Zoe out for a date. The date, however, went downhill when Cooper discovered that Zoe's dad resembles (and acts like) Stuart. In August 2009, the two started dating again, but Zoe eventually broke up when Cooper stopped paying attention to her.

Spike Was hired after Marla discovered Stuart was keeping a secret "Do Not Hire" file based on visible tattoos and unnatural hair colors or styles. Marla informed Connie, the DM, and Stuart was forced to hire employees he felt were not employable. Spike, a man sporting a mohawk and sleeve tattoos, was Marla's first hire. Much to Stuart's chagrin, Spike turned out to be a model employee: polite, courteous and knowledgeable (especially in terms of video games, he has several YouTube videos reviewing different systems and games). Despite all of these favorable aspects, Stuart transferred Spike from the floor to the stockroom where he worked with Cooper and Lunker. Spike was written out in January 2009 when Stuart was forced to lay off all seasonal help.

Gus Cooper and Lunker's manager at the Gas We Got convenience store. Cooper and Lunker both took jobs at Gas We Got temporarily when their hours were cut back at Grumbel's.

Amber Amber was hired in June 2011 before Marla's honeymoon. She was previously employed by Abersnobby and Finch a parody of Abercrombie and Fitch. The strip portrays her as courteous and efficient in her work

Donnie Donnie was hired to take Cooper's place as a normal stock-worker when Cooper was promoted to stockroom supervisor in late 2013; he applied to Grumbel's after the manager at his previous store cut his hours for beating him in one of the tabletop games they sold. He and Cooper have many overlapping interests (including Doctor Who and the works of JRR Tolkien).

Heather Heather is a front-line employee and Donnie's girlfriend. After working as holiday help in the 2014 holiday season, Heather was hired on permanently by Marla in January 2015. She shares many of Donnie's interests, and is a highly-competitive tabletop strategy gamer. Heather's demure looks conceal a surprisingly assertive personality. She has an eccentric and occasionally dark sense of humor.

Marisa Marisa is a front-line employee. She was hired as holiday help in the 2015 holiday season, and was hired on permanently in January 2016.

Bradley Fontaine The district manager for the Delman's department store in the same mall. Brad was first seen shopping at Grumbel's trying to hire some of the better employees (including Amber and Val, before being caught by Marla) to work at Delman's before it opened.

Mina The assistant manager and then store manager at Delman's. Mina is portrayed as self-serving and always looking for a way to move up the corporate ladder herself (including falsifying comparison prices between Grumbel's and Delman's to harm her current manager). While comparing prices, Marla and Mina bonded with each other, to the point that Marla considered hiring Mina as a replacement for Josh. According to Amber, Mina once worked at a different Abersnobby and Finch, in the describing her as "the most evil manager in the store's history." She has been known to steal Grumbel's interviews whenever an opening or Christmas help is needed.

Greg The store manager at Delman's before Mina took on the role. Greg is the apparent target of Mina's cut-throat approach to her job, with Mina saying "that's where the knife goes" when thanked by Greg for having his back. Greg appears to have a strong working relationship with his DM, Brad, although he has been seen complaining about the "unrealistic" sales goals that Delman's sets.

== Themes ==
The strip primarily focuses on the interpersonal relations between the characters and the additional people they are forced to interact with as a result of their profession. These types of relationships are based very much on the real life interactions of retail employees, and are then presented in a humorous light. There are several types of relationships that are explored repeatedly.

Employee-Management Relationship This type of relationship occurs in nearly all types of employment, but there are facets of this relationship that are unique to retail situations. Some of the struggles that take place in retail employment is the issue of scheduling, managing difficult customers, enforcement of store policies, the perception of management incompetence, and so on. Feuti has used the dynamics of the relationship between Stuart and the rest of the staff to illustrate this relationship.

Employee-Customer Relationship While the customer dynamic exists in all types of businesses, in retail stores this dynamic can take on a unique flair. Since retail stores cannot choose who their customers are, retail clerks are forced to wait on anyone who walks through the door. While most customers are polite and understanding, a small percentage can be rude, egocentric, demanding, mentally unstable, emotional, or suffer from any number of other types of undesirable traits. Since all retail stores have a goal of earning repeated business, employees will often sacrifice their better judgement or dignity to meet the demands of such customers. The strip has a quantity of recurring "notorious regulars" such as "Creepy Guy" and "Crazy Hat Lady." On the other side of the relationship, stores often hire individuals who are not up to the demands of the work placed on them. When customers find themselves dealing with an employee who is incompetent, it can often be a very frustrating experience. Dealing with annoying customers is probably the most frequently recurring theme in the strip. For the flip side of the relationship, the character Courtney is typically used to highlight incompetent retail employees.

Employee-Employee Relationship As with most emplacement situations, retail employees find themselves working with their coworkers for dozens of hours each week. This proximity forces relationships, some of which work well, other don't for a variety of reasons. While for the most part the employees of Grumbel's are shown as a group of friends, there have been exceptions throughout the strip's run.

Individual Store-Corporate Headquarters Relationship Retail stores policies are often set by a corporate headquarters, by people who do not interact with customers on a daily basis. This can create tension between what the employees see as practical and what corporate headquarters views as financially lucrative. This dynamic is most often illustrated in the strip through the relationship between Marla and Jerry.

== Publications ==
=== Collections ===
Title	Publication Date	ISBN
This Is So Bogus My Head Hurts!	November 2013	978-1-304-65379-6

=== Parodies ===
Title	Publication Date	ISBN
Pretending You Care: The Retail Employee Handbook	November 2007	978-1-4013-0890-2

=== Treasuries ===
No treasuries have yet been published.

== Cooper's Retail Blog ==
In early 2007, the strip followed a short plot line where Cooper won $5000 in a scratch off lottery. While initially excited by his luck, he became despondent when he realized that $5000 was not enough money to have a significant effect on his quality of life. He cheered up though when he realized that he could use the money to purchase a laptop and air his grievances through a personal blog. Once the strip was published Norm Feuti published the blog and wrote it from the perspective of the fictional Cooper. The blog is used with his own personal blog to communicate with his fans and keep them updated with news on the strip.

According to Feuti, "I had to stop doing it a while back so I could devote time to some other projects. Tragically, the file I saved all the material on before taking down the old site got corrupted somehow, so the original material is lost forever."
