= You Are (Not) Small =

2014 children's book written by Anna Kang and illustrated by Christopher Weyant

- Cover of the 2014 Two Lions edition
- Author: Anna Kang
- Illustrator: Christopher Weyant
- Language: English
- Genre: Children's literature
- Publisher: Two Lions
- Publication date: 2014
- Publication place: New York
- Pages: 32
- Awards: Geisel Award
- ISBN: 978-1-4778-4772-5

You Are (Not) Small is a children's book written by Anna Kang and illustrated by Christopher Weyant. The book was published in 2014 by Two Lions. It received positive reviews and won the 2015 Geisel Award.
