= Norm Feuti =

American cartoonist

- Feuti at Boston Book Festival in 2026
- Born: May 14, 1970 (age 56) United States
- Areas: Cartoonist, author, illustrator
- Notable works: Retail; Gil; Beak & Ally; Hello, Hedgehog!
- Awards: Theodor Seuss Geisel Honor (2022)

Norman Feuti (born May 14, 1970) is an American cartoonist and children's author and illustrator. He created the syndicated comic strips Retail (2006–2020) and Gil (2012–2022), and has written and illustrated the early reader series Hello, Hedgehog! and Beak & Ally. The first Beak & Ally book received a Theodor Seuss Geisel Honor in 2022.

== Early life and personal life ==
Feuti was born on May 14, 1970. Feuti grew up in Pascoag, Rhode Island and has an older sister. He has said that he drew on his childhood experiences with poverty for his 2026 graphic novel A Kid Like Me. He has also lived in Plainville, Massachusetts.

== Retail ==
Feuti worked in retail for about 15 years, mostly as an assistant manager. After the birth of his first child in 2001, he stayed home during the day and worked retail at nights, and took advantage of his free time by pitching comic strips to syndicates. He made a retail-themed pitch that was rejected but drew the interest of King Features Syndicate editor Jay Kennedy, who encouraged him to return to the idea. King Features eventually purchased Retail in 2005.

Retail was set at the fictional "Grumbel's" department store and followed an assistant manager named Marla. It ran from January 1, 2006, to February 23, 2020, appearing in 90 newspapers across the United States and Canada. In 2020, Feuti chose not to renew his contract, citing a four-book contract with HarperCollins and the decline of the newspaper industry over the past twenty years.

== Gil ==
Feuti's second strip, Gil, was about an eight-year-old boy and his single mother in a poverty-stricken household. He initially launched the strip as a webcomic titled "Gill" in 2008 after it failed to find a syndicate, self-publishing the collection Gill #1 in 2009 before pausing the webcomic later that year. In 2010 he submitted a reworked version of the strip to King Features, with the first strip launching in newspapers on January 2, 2012. It was cancelled on December 29, 2013, because too few papers had picked it up. Feuti blamed the strip's cancellation on editors feeling that the strip was too depressing. After the strip's cancellation, The Providence Journal received a significant number of letters from upset readers, inspiring them to continue the strip as a Sunday feature until 2022.

== Children's books ==
Feuti's first graphic novel, The King of Kazoo, was published by Scholastic in 2016. The book, a fantasy story, follows the characters King Cornelius and his daughter Bing on an expedition to a mysterious tunnel. The book was well-received by critics, with Kirkus Reviews complimenting the pacing and humor and School Library Journal comparing the artwork to that of Carl Barks.

In 2026 Feuti published the graphic novel A Kid Like Me via HarperAlley. The book is about a sixth grader named Ethan who feels out of place among his wealthier classmates. Kirkus Reviews published a starred review praising the book and described it as "an honest and authentic portrayal of navigating an underprivileged childhood." It was a finalist for the 2026 New England Book Awards.

Feuti has also published several series. His Hello, Hedgehog! series follows a Hedgehog and guinea pig (named Harry) on their adventures, while his Beak & Ally series follows an introverted alligator and extroverted songbird. Both series have been positively received by critics, and the first book in the Beak & Ally series was named a Giesel Honor Book in 2022.

== Bibliography ==
=== Comic strip books ===
- Pretending You Care: The Retail Employee Handbook. Hyperion. 2007. ISBN 978-1-4013-0890-2.
- Gill #1. Self-published. 2009.
- Retail Year One: This Is So Bogus My Head Hurts!. Self-published through Lulu. 2013. ISBN 978-1-304-65379-6.

=== Graphic novels ===
- The King of Kazoo. Scholastic. 2016. ISBN 978-0-545-77088-0.
- A Kid Like Me. HarperAlley. 2026. ISBN 978-0-06-335411-1.

=== Hello, Hedgehog! ===
1. Do You Like My Bike?. Scholastic. 2019. ISBN 978-1-338-28139-2.
2. Let's Have a Sleepover!. Scholastic. 2019. ISBN 978-1-338-28141-5.
3. Who Needs a Checkup?. Scholastic. 2020. ISBN 978-1-338-28144-6.
4. Let's Go Swimming!. Scholastic. 2021. ISBN 978-1-338-67712-6.
5. Can I Have a Turn?. Scholastic. 2022. ISBN 978-1-338-67714-0.
6. Happy Birthday, Hedgehog!. Scholastic. 2022. ISBN 978-1-338-67717-1.

=== Beak & Ally ===
1. Unlikely Friends. HarperAlley. 2021. ISBN 978-0-06-302157-0.
2. Bedtime Jitters. HarperAlley. 2021. ISBN 978-0-06-302160-0.
3. The Big Storm. HarperAlley. 2022. ISBN 978-0-06-302163-1.
4. Snow Birds. HarperAlley. 2023. ISBN 978-0-06-302167-9.
