= Henry and Mudge and the Great Grandpas =

2005 children's Book by Cynthia Rylant

Henry and Mudge and the Great Grandpas, the 26th book in the Henry and Mudge series, is a 2005 beginning reader's children's book written by Cynthia Rylant and illustrated by Suçie Stevenson. The book was well reviewed and won the inaugural Geisel Award in 2006.

== Plot ==
Told in four chapters, Henry and his dog Mudge visit Henry's great grandfather, Bill. Bill lives with several other "grandpas" who all like Henry and Mudge. While the grandpas are resting, Henry and Mudge explore the woods nearby where they find a pond to go swimming. Knowing his parents don't allow him to swim alone, Henry goes back to get his dad to supervise. Bill and the other grandpas decide to go too, with everyone swimming in their underwear. After swimming, they lay out in the sun and the grandpas tell stories about their lives. They then head back to the house where Henry's mother has made spaghetti for them to eat.

== Reception and awards ==
In a starred review Booklist reviewer Hazel Rochman, wrote that the book, "is even more joyful than the others in the popular series." Several reviewers noted the way the illustrations provided context clues for new readers ready for short chapter books.

The book won the 2006 Geisel Award for best beginning reader's book awarded by the Association for Library Service to Children (ALSC). The award committee cited, "The simple sentence structure, along with a design that advances this well-told story, provides a satisfying celebration of family and friendship."
