= Laura Vaccaro Seeger =

American writer

- Known for: Children's books
- Notable work: First the Egg

Laura Vaccaro Seeger is an American author and illustrator of children's books. She has often appeared on the New York Times Bestseller List and has won the Caldecott Honor twice, the New York Times Best Illustrated Book Award, the Boston Globe-Horn Book Award for Best Picture Book, the Empire State Award for "Body of Work and Contribution to Children’s Literature", the Massachusetts Reading Association Award for "Body of Work and Contribution to Children's Literature", and the Theodor Seuss Geisel Honor twice.

== Career ==
In 1980, Seeger earned her BFA degree at the School of Fine Art and Design at SUNY Purchase in Westchester, New York. She began a career as an animator, artist, designer and editor in the network television business. She created show openings and special segments for NBC and ABC for many years and won an Emmy Award for an NBC Special opening animation.

Paintings created by Seeger have been displayed at the Art Institute of Chicago, Eric Carle Museum of Picture Book Art, Mazza Museum, New York Public Library, and Nassu County Museum of Art.

== Personal life ==
Seeger lives in Rockville Centre, Long Island, with her husband, Chris Arley Seeger.

== Books ==
- Why?, 2019
- Blue, 2018
- Bear in the Chair, 2017
- Dog Changes His Name, 2017
- I Used to be Afraid, 2015
- Dog and Bear - Tricks and Treats, 2014
- Bully, 2013
- Green, 2012
- What if?, 2010
- Dog and Bear - Three to Get Ready, 2009
- Dog and Bear - Two's Company, 2008
- One Boy, 2008
- First the Egg, 2007
- Dog and Bear - Two Friends, Three Stories, 2007
- Black? White! Day? Night! - A Book of Opposites, 2006
- Walter Was Worried, 2005
- Lemons Are Not Red, 2004
- The Hidden Alphabet, 2003
- I Had a Rooster, 2001

== Awards ==
- Massachusetts Reading Association Award for Body of Work and Contribution to Children'Literature - 2014
- ALA Notable Book, 2004-2009 and 2014
- Caldecott Honor Book, 2013
- New York Empire State Award for Body of Work and Contribution to Children's Literature - 2011
- School Library Journal Best Book, 2010
- Bank Street College of Education Best Book, 2010
- Theodor Seuss Geisel Honor Book, 2009
- NCTE Notable Children's Book in Language Arts, 2009
- Publishers Weekly Best Book, 2008
- Caldecott Honor Book, 2008
- Theodor Seuss Geisel Honor Book, 2008
- New York Times Best Illustrated Book of 2007
- New York Times Best Seller]
- Horn Book Fanfare Best Book of 2007
- Oppenheim Platinum Award, 2008
- Boston Globe-Horn Book Award Winner for Best Picture Book, 2007
- Publishers Weekly Best Book, 2007
- Child Magazine Best Book, 2004-2006
- Nick Jr./Family Magazine Best Book, 2006
- Booklist Editor's Choice, 2007-2008
- IRA Children's Choice Best Book, 2006
- New York Public Library Best Book, 2003-2004 and 2007-2008
- NBC Today Show Best Book for Gift Giving, 2003
