= Maya Tatsukawa =

American author and illustrator

Maya Tatsukawa is an American author and illustrator of children's books. She lives outside of Boston.

In 2021, the Association for Library Service to Children included The Bear in My Family on their list of Notable Children's Books. It was also named as an Honor Book for the Geisel Award.

In 2023, Kirkus Reviews named Mole is Not Alone one of the best children's books of the year.

== Publications ==
=== As author and illustrator ===
- The Bear in My Family. Dial Press. 2020. ISBN 9780525555827.
- Sunday Pancakes. Dial Press. 2022. ISBN 9780593406632.
- Mole Is Not Alone. Henry Holt and Co. 2023. ISBN 9781250869647.

=== As illustrator ===
- Farrell, Darren (2021). Dandelion Magic. Dial Press. ISBN 9780593112908.
- Farrell, Darren (2022). Give This Book Away!. Knopf Books for Young Readers. ISBN 9780593480519.
