= First the Egg =

2007 children's book by Laura Vaccaro Seeger

- First edition
- Author: Laura Vaccaro Seeger
- Illustrator: Laura Vaccaro Seeger
- Cover artist: Seeger
- Language: English
- Genre: Children's fiction, picture book
- Publisher: Roaring Brook Press
- Publication date: September 4, 2007
- Publication place: United States
- Awards: Caldecott Honor Book
- ISBN: 9781596432727

First the Egg is a New York Times bestselling children's picture book written and illustrated by Laura Vaccaro Seeger, published by Roaring Book Press in 2007. It was a Caldecott Honor Book in 2008 and also appeared on the New York Times Best Illustrated Children's Books list and the American Library Association Notable Children's Books list.

The book comprises a series of die-cut pages that convey various forms of transformation. Seeger uses word play and alters the composition of the illustrations between cut-outs to create unexpected relationships among basic concepts such as time, opposites, and colors. In 2009, the company Weston Woods Studios, Inc. made a version of the book, narrated by Elle Fanning, with music by Jack Sundrud and Rusty Young.

== Reception ==
Publishers Weekly described First the Egg as "another nimble page-turner...", and Inis magazine called it "whimsical and bold..."

== Awards and honors ==
- New York Times Best Illustrated Children's Books (2007)
- Caldecott Honor Book (2008)
- American Library Association Notable Children's Books (2008)
