= Gary Sunshine =

American dramatist

Gary Sunshine is an American playwright and television writer. He was born in Brooklyn, New York and raised on Long Island, where his father was a self-employed plastic slipcover cutter and his mother was a computer programmer.

Sunshine started writing plays a year after graduating from Princeton University, where he majored in English with a concentration in Theater. He received an MFA from NYU's Dramatic Writing Program. He received the Helen Merrill Award for Emerging Playwrights and has also been a recipient of a NYFA Fellowship. His work has been published in The Best American Short Plays and Monologues for Men by Men. He is an alumnus of New Dramatists and a member of the Writers Guild of America, East, and the Dramatists Guild.

In December 2004, Sunshine was in residence at the Royal National Theatre Studio in London. He wrote, co-created, and co-produced the documentary What I Want My Words To Do To You, which premiered nationwide on PBS’s P.O.V. after being awarded the Freedom of Expression Award at the 2003 Sundance Film Festival and the Audience Choice Award at HBO's Provincetown Film Festival.

== Plays ==
- This Joan
- Reasons to wake up
- Star of mine
- A history of plastic slipcovers
- Al takes a bride
- Mercury
- Sweetness

== Television ==
- As the World Turns (Breakdown Writer: December 2006 – July 2007)
- Hung – HBO Television Series
