= Stephen Savage =

British musician

Stephen Savage was born in England, attending St Albans School, and after early training with Dorothy Hesse, studied with Bruno Seidlhofer at the Wiener Akademie and Cyril Smith at the RCM London where he became his teaching assistant immediately after graduating.

Two years later Stephen Savage was appointed the youngest professor of Piano at the RCM at a time when he was also becoming established as a concert pianist, with frequent appearances at the Wigmore and Queen Elizabeth halls and for the BBC including live broadcasts in the prestigious Tuesday Invitation Concerts. He appeared in concerto performances with Sir Adrian Boult, David Atherton and Andrew Davis and became known for his insight into a wide range of music, including new compositions. He is the dedicatee of major works by Justin Connolly and Roger Smalley, whose Accord for two pianos he premiered with the composer.

From 1982, Stephen Savage was based in Australia as Head of Keyboard Studies at the Queensland Conservatorium, Griffith University. He became established as a distinguished teacher and performer in Australia, appearing with most of the leading symphony orchestras and at the festivals of Sydney, Perth and Brisbane. He gave the first local performance of the Lutoslawski concerto with the Sydney Symphony Orchestra, and also organised and performed a week-long festival of the works of Sir Michael Tippett during the composer's 1990 visit. This remains the largest event of its kind to be mounted in Australia. He also founded and conducted the Griffith University Ensemble and has been active in introducing student ensembles to a wide range of the most important music of the last century. He founded, and is the curator of, the Kawai Keyboard Series at the Queensland Conservatorium Griffith University in Brisbane in 1998, which is now the largest and most comprehensive series in the country.

Stephen Savage also tours extensively as recitalist and teacher in many parts of the Far East as well as the UK where he has been a frequent visitor to the leading music schools. His recordings include Tippett's Piano Sonatas, Smalley's Accord with the composer, works by Andrew Ford and acclaimed CDs of the last three Sonatas of Beethoven and of Mussorgsky's Pictures at an Exhibition. He celebrated the Tippett centenary year with concerts in London and Manchester and a series within the Queensland Music Festival. He returned to the UK in 2006.
