= Kait Kerrigan =

American writer

Kait Kerrigan is an American playwright and musical theater lyricist and book writer.

== Biography ==
Kait Kerrigan is a playwright and a lyricist and composer of musicals. Originally from Kingston, Pennsylvania, she graduated from Wyoming Valley West Senior High School (Plymouth, Pennsylvania, 1999) and Barnard College (2003, with a degree in English Literature). She is a member of the BMI Lehman Engel Musical Theater Workshop.

=== Work with Bree Lowdermilk ===
Kerrigan is most well known for her collaborations with Bree Lowdermilk. Their works together include shows such as The Woman Upstairs and The Mad Ones (formerly known as The Unauthorized Autobiography of Samantha Brown) with Zach Altman.

She and Lowdermilk collaborated on TheaterworksUSA's adaptation of Henry and Mudge, which premiered Off-Broadway in 2006 at the Lucille Lortel Theatre. They also worked on the project, Republic, an adaptation of William Shakespeare's Henry IV, set in Northern Ireland in the 1970s.

In 2011, Kerrigan and Lowdermilk released their first CD, "Our First Mistake". The CD was a result of fan support through a campaign on Kickstarter. To celebrate both the CD and their fans, Kerrigan-Lowdermilk launched a series of New York City concerts under the name You Made This Tour. A selection of recordings from these concerts was bundled for their follow-up album, "Kerrigan-Lowdermilk Live".

The pair made their London debut at the St James Theatre in February 2014 in a concert series produced by United Theatrical - a London-based theatrical production company run by Stuart Matthew Price and James Yeoburn. The featured singers included West End performers Rachel Tucker, Julie Atherton, Daniel Boys and Lauren Samuels.

=== Other Work ===
In July 2023, it was announced that Kerrigan would premiere her book for a new musical adaptation of F. Scott Fitzgerald's The Great Gatsby in October of that same year at the Paper Mill Playhouse. The musical featured music and lyrics by Jason Howland and Nathan Tysen with direction by Marc Bruni. The production transferred to Broadway in April 2024.

Kerrigan co-wrote the upcoming musical Indigo with Scott Evan Davis, which premiered in the U.K. in the summer of 2025.

== Works ==
- Henry and Mudge (with Bree Lowdermilk)
- Her Old Possessions
- Tender Wars in the Green-Gold Room
- Transit
- Imaginary Love
- The Mad Ones (music and lyrics by Bree Lowdermilk; book and lyrics by Kait Kerrigan; additional book and concept by Zach Altman)
- Tales from the Bad Years (with Bree Lowdermilk)
- The Woman Upstairs (with Bree Lowdermilk)
- Wrong Number (with Bree Lowdermilk)
- Republic (with Bree Lowdermilk)
- Unbound (with Bree Lowdermilk)
- Flash of Time (with Bree Lowdermilk)
- Justice (with Bree Lowdermilk)
- The Great Gatsby (with Jason Howland and Nathan Tysen)
- Indigo (with Scott Evan Davis)
- The Heart
- Ernxst, Or The Importance of Being (with Bree Lowdermilk and Justin Eliabeth Sayre)

== Personal life ==
Kerrigan is married to lyricist Nathan Tysen. The couple has two children.
