= Tedd Arnold =

American novelist (born 1949)

- Born: January 20, 1949 (age 77); Elmira, New York, U.S.
- Education: University of Florida (BFA)
- Occupations: Children's book writer and illustrator
- Spouse: Carol
- Children: Walter and William
- Writing career
- Language: English
- Genre: Children's literature
- Notable awards: "Theodor Seuss Geisel Honor" for his book "Hi! Fly Guy!"
- Website: www.teddarnoldbooks.com

Tedd Arnold (born January 20, 1949, in Elmira, New York, United States) is an American children's book writer and illustrator. He has written and illustrated over 100 books, and he has won the Theodor Seuss Geisel Honor for his books Hi! Fly Guy! (2006), I Spy Fly Guy (2010), and Noodleheads See the Future (2018). He currently lives outside of Gainesville, Florida.

== Background ==
Arnold graduated from the University of Florida with a BFA. He worked as a commercial illustrator before beginning his career writing children's books. He met his wife, Carol, while living in Florida. Carol, a former kindergarten teacher, encouraged him to write and illustrate children's books. His sons were the inspiration for some of his characters and stories.

== Awards ==
Tedd's first book, No Jumping on the Bed! was an IRA-CBC Children's Choice book and was also selected as a Parents Magazine 50 All-Time Best Children's Book. He is a three-time winner of the ALA's Theodor Seuss Geisel Honor for Hi! Fly Guy and for I Spy Fly Guy, and Noodleheads See the Future

== Works ==
=== Novels for older teens ===
- Rat Life (Edgar Award for Best Young Adult Novel, 2008)

=== Children's books written and illustrated by Tedd Arnold ===
- Noodlehead Nightmares (2016)
- Noodleheads See the Future (2017) - 2018 Theodor Seuss Geisel Award Honor Book
- Noodleheads Find Something Fishy (2018)
- Noodleheads Fortress of Doom (2019)
- Dirty Gert
- Fix This Mess
- Vincent Paints His House
- Parts
- More Parts
- Even More Parts
- Bialosky's Bedside Books—a collection of the following books:
  - Bialosky's Bedtime
  - Bialosky's House
  - Bialosky's Bumblebees
  - Bialosky's Big Mess
- The Simple People
- No More Water in the Tub!
- The Signmaker's Assistant
- Five Ugly Monsters
- Green Wilma
- Green Wilma, Frog in Space
- Catalina Magdalena Hoopensteiner Wallendiner Hogan Logan Bogan Was Her Name
- The Twin Princes
- No Jumping on the Bed! (1987)
- My First Drawing Book
- Help I'm Falling to Bits
- My First Play House
- My First Play Town
- Sounds
- Opposites
- Actions
- Colors
- Ollie Forgot (1988)
- Mother Goose's Words of Wit and Wisdom

==== Fly Guy ====
Fly Guy focuses on a friendly fly named Fly Guy and his owner Buzz.

1. Hi! Fly Guy (2005) – 2006 Theodor Seuss Geisel Award Honor Book
2. Super Fly Guy (2006)
3. Shoo, Fly Guy! (2006)
4. There Was An Old Lady Who Swallowed Fly Guy (2007)
5. Fly High, Fly Guy (2008)
6. Hooray for Fly Guy (2008)
7. I Spy Fly Guy (2009) – 2010 Theodor Seuss Geisel Award Honor Book
8. Fly Guy Meets Fly Girl
9. Buzz Boy and Fly Guy (2010)
10. Fly Guy vs. the Flyswatter
11. Ride, Fly Guy, Ride
12. There's a Fly Guy in my Soup
13. Fly Guy and the Frankenfly
14. Fly Guy's Amazing Tricks
15. A Pet for Fly Guy
16. Prince Fly Guy
17. Fly Guy's Ninja Christmas
18. Fly Guy's Big Family
19. Fly Guy and the Aliens
20. Attack of the 50 Foot Fly Guy
21. Fly Guy Presents: Sharks
22. Fly Guy Presents: Space
23. Fly Guy Presents: Dinosaurs
24. Fly Guy Presents: Firefighters
25. Fly Guy Presents: Insects
26. Fly Guy Presents: Bats
27. Fly Guy Presents: Snakes
28. Fly Guy Presents: The White House (2016)
29. Fly Guy Presents: Weather (2016)
30. Why Fly Guy? (2017)
31. Fly Guy Presents Castles
32. Fly Guy Presents Police
33. Fly Guy Presents Garbage (2019)
34. Fly Guy Presents Monster Trucks (2019)

==== Huggly (The Monster Under the Bed) ====
This series focuses on the adventures of Huggly, a cute and pudgy green monster with a yellow belly, living under the People Child's bed with the help of his best friends Booter and Grubble.

- Huggly Goes to School
- Huggly's Big Mess
- Huggly Gets Dressed
- Huggly's Pizza
- Huggly's Trip to the Beach
- Huggly's Snow Day
- Huggly Goes Camping
- Huggly Takes a Bath
- Huggly's Halloween
- Huggly's Thanksgiving Parade
- Huggly and the Toy Monster
- Huggly's Christmas
- Huggly's Sleep Over
- Huggly's Valentines

==== Illustrator, or collaboration only ====
- Detective Blue by Steve Metzger
- The Yuckiest, Stinkiest, Best Valentine Ever by Brenda Ferber
- Axle Annie and the Speed Grump by Robin Pulver
- Lasso Lou and Cowboy McCoy by Barbara Larmon Failing
- My Dog Never Says Please by Suzanne Williams
- Giant Children by Brod Bagert
- My Working Mom by Peter Glassman
- Looking for Zebra: Hotel Zoo: Happy Hunting from A to Z by Ron Atlas
- Inside a House That Is Haunted by Alyssa Capucilli
- Tracks by David Galef
- My First Gamebook by Katy Dobbs
- My First Baking Book by Rena Coyle
- My First Computer Book by David Schiller, David Rosenbloom
- My First Camera Book by Anne Kostick
- Inside a Zoo in the City by Alyssa Satin Capucilli
- The Roly Poly Spider by Jill Sardegna
- Inside a Barn in the Country: A Rebus Read-Along Story by Alyssa Satin Capucilli
- Why Did the Chicken Cross the Road? Harry Bliss, David Catrow, Marla Frazee, Jerry Pinkney, Chris Raschka, Judy Schachner, David Shannon, Mo Willems Jon Agee
- Manners Mash-Up
- Dinosaur Dig: Cooperative Game-In-A Book by Liza Schafer, Vincent Ceci, Jacqueline Swensen
- Guys Write For Guys Read by Jon Scieszka

=== PC games ===
- Huggly's Sleepover: I'm Ready for Kindergarten (October 4, 1996)
- Huggly Saves the Turtles: Thinking Adventures (July 8, 2000)
