= Ron Marshall (footballer) =

Australian rules footballer

Personal information
- Full name: Ronald William Marshall
- Born: 26 November 1915; South Yarra, Victoria
- Died: 2 November 2001 (aged 85)

Playing career^{1}
Years	Club	Games (Goals)
1938–41	Port Melbourne (VFA)	19 (2)
1943	Melbourne	2 (0)
- ^{1} Playing statistics correct to the end of 1943.

Ronald William Marshall (26 November 1915 – 2 November 2001) was an Australian rules footballer who played with Melbourne in the Victorian Football League (VFL) and Port Melbourne in the Victorian Football Association (VFA).

Marshall also served in the Australian Army for 11 months during World War II.
