= Fly Guy (video game) =

2002 flash game

- Starting location
- Publisher: Trevor van Meter
- Designer: Trevor van Meter
- Programmers: Jason Krogh (2002); Tom Sennett (2016)
- Artist: Trevor van Meter
- Composers: Brian McBrearty; Vas Kottas
- Engine: Adobe Flash (2002); GameMaker (2016)
- Platforms: Web browser; iOS; Android
- Release: Web: 2002; iOS, Android: 2016
- Genre: Graphic adventure
- Mode: Single-player

Fly Guy is a 2002 graphic adventure video game released for Adobe Flash and designed by Trevor van Meter, an illustrator and graphic designer from Greenville, North Carolina.

== Gameplay ==
Gameplay in Fly Guy is minimal; players control a man with the arrow keys, letting him move left and right and fly up and down. Throughout the world of the game, players can encounter many abstract and nonsensical things, such as a floating monk, a sumo wrestler, and a man tiling bricks to make the sky, revealing a starry backdrop behind them. There are no goals or loss states in the game. When the player ascends high enough, the game ends.

== Development ==
In an interview, van Meter said that he created Fly Guy because he felt that people with jobs wanted to escape, so he built a Flash game around that idea.

== Reception ==
Time magazine listed Fly Guy as one of their favorite websites of 2004, calling it "A delightful bit of interactive flash" and "not a bad place to be". The New York Observer's Very Short List called it "whimsical and deceptively simple".

== Legacy ==
On July 29, 2016, Fly Guy was re-released on mobile platforms and was available for iOS and Android. The game was rebuilt in GameMaker by Tom Sennett.

As of 2021, these versions are no longer available.
