= The Woman Upstairs (musical) =

The Woman Upstairs is a musical by Bree Lowdermilk (music and lyrics) and Kait Kerrigan (book and additional lyrics) that premiered in 2004 at the inaugural New York Musical Theatre Festival (NYMF). The plot concerns the romance between a physics professor named Helen Morton and a blind violinist named Milo who lives in the apartment below her.

== Original Production ==
The original NYMF production of The Woman Upstairs opened at the Puerto Rican Traveling Theater in Manhattan on September 23, 2004, and played for five performances, closing on October 3. It was directed by Kerrigan, conducted by Lowdermilk, and starred Deb Heinig (Helen), Aaron Ramey (Milo), Alison Fraser (Gracie), and Kate Shindle (Prof. Kassan). Josh Young played a variety of ensemble roles, including a student and a beatboxer. Casting was by Michael Cassara.

== Musical Numbers ==
Act 1

- "The Number One Complaint" — Gracie, Company
- "Me and Jackie D" — Gracie, Milo
- "Lady, Lady" — Student 1, Student 2, Company
- "Options" — Prof. Kassan
- "You Will Bloom" — Mother, Child
- "Me and Jackie D" (Reprise) — Gracie
- "Of Course" — Milo
- "Will You Come With Me" — Phil
- "I'll Still Be" — Nurse, Company
- "Oh Now" — Milo, Student 2
- "Options II" — Prof. Kassan
- "When I Take" — Chorister, Company

Act 2

- "A Crowded Downtown Train" — Student 1, Mother, Company
- "Go On" — Milo
- "His Arms" — Gracie
- "You Will Bloom" (Reprise) — Child
- "Fusion" — Hippie, Company
- "Big, Big World" — Girl 1, Girl 2
- "Five and a Half Minutes" — Prof. Kassan
- "These Days" — Father, Milo
- "Before I Go" — Milo
- "How It Sounds" — Helen Morton

== Critical response ==
In his review of the original production, Matthew Murray of Talkin' Broadway wrote, "Sometimes, a musical comes along that announces itself from its first few notes as something very, very special. The Woman Upstairs...is just such a musical" and called the show "one of the year's most exciting musical dramas." David Finkle of TheaterMania.com agreed, writing that "Lowdermilk and Kerrigan are the real thing, and The Woman Upstairs is as promising as a musical in the developmental stage can get."

Neil Genzlinger of The New York Times wrote that "this modern-day romance... is not ready for prime time. In fact, it's a confused mess. But the intermittent moments when it actually finds its footing provide some reward."
