= The Woman Upstairs (film) =

1921 film

- Directed by: Fred Paul
- Starring: Joan Beverley and Frank Hill
- Release date: 1921
- Country: United Kingdom
- Language: English

The Woman Upstairs is a 1921 British drama film directed by Fred Paul and starring Joan Beverley and Frank Hill. It was part of a Grand Guignol series of films. It focuses on the relationship between a demi-mondaine and a newly married man.

== Cast ==
- Joan Beverley - Rose, the demi-mondaine
- Frank Hill - Fred Ellsworthy, the husband
