= Henry and Mudge =

Children's book series by Cynthia Rylant

- First book in the series
- Author: Cynthia Rylant
- Illustrator: Suçie Stevenson
- Publisher: Simon & Schuster
- No. of books: 28

Henry and Mudge is a series of American children's books written by Newbery Medal winner Cynthia Rylant and illustrated by Suçie Stevenson. The series is a common read found in curricula for second and third grade.

A theatre adaptation of the same name was made by Kait Kerrigan and Bree Lowdermilk intended for grades Pre-K through 3rd.

== Plot ==
The story revolves around a young boy, Henry, and his canine companion, Mudge, an English Mastiff. Throughout the series, Henry learns many lessons, usually with the help of the 182-pound Mudge, about life, loyalty, and love. Henry has a cousin named Annie who often features as well (and who stars in her own follow-up series Annie and Snowball, also by Rylant).

== Characters ==
- Henry: A boy who often learns life lessons.
- Mudge: Henry's loyal pet dog.
- Mom: Henry's mother.
- Dad: Henry's father.
- Annie: Henry's cousin.
- Snowball: Annie's pet bunny.

== Books ==
1. Henry and Mudge The First Book (1987)
2. Henry and Mudge in Puddle Trouble (1987)
3. Henry and Mudge in the Green Time (1987)
4. Henry and Mudge Under the Yellow Moon (1987)
5. Henry and Mudge in the Sparkle Days (1988)
6. Henry and Mudge and the Forever Sea (1989)
7. Henry and Mudge Get the Cold Shivers (1989)
8. Henry and Mudge and the Happy Cat (1990)
9. Henry and Mudge and the Bedtime Thumps (1991)
10. Henry and Mudge Take the Big Test (1991)
11. Henry and Mudge and the Long Weekend (1992)
12. Henry and Mudge and the Wild Wind (1993)
13. Henry and Mudge and the Careful Cousin (1994)
14. Henry and Mudge and the Best Day of All (1995)
15. Henry and Mudge in the Family Trees (1998)
16. Henry and Mudge and the Sneaky Crackers (1999)
17. Henry and Mudge and the Starry Night (1999)
18. Henry and Mudge and Annie's Good Move (2000)
19. Henry and Mudge and the Snowman Plan (2000)
20. Henry and Mudge and Annie's Perfect Pet (2001)
21. Henry and Mudge and the Tall Tree House (2002)
22. Henry and Mudge and Mrs. Hopper's House (2003)
23. Henry and Mudge and the Wild Goose Chase (2003)
24. Henry and Mudge and the Funny Lunch (2004)
25. Henry and Mudge and a Very Merry Christmas (2004)
26. Henry and Mudge and the Great Grandpas (2005)
27. Henry and Mudge and the Tumbling Trip (2005)
28. Henry and Mudge and the Big Sleepover (2007)
