= David Catrow =

American illustrator

- Born: David Johnson Catrow III; December 16, 1952 (age 73)
- Known for: Children's picture books
- Website: catrow.com

David Catrow (born December 16, 1952) is an American artist, cartoonist, and illustrator of children's books.

Catrow has illustrated over 60 children's books and prior to this, worked as a cartoonist at the Springfield News-Sun (Ohio). His illustrations for the book She's Wearing a Dead Bird on Her Head! was one of The New York Times "Best Illustrated Books of the Year" for 1995. He was the illustrator for How Murray Saved Christmas written by Mike Reiss which was adapted into a 2014 animated television special of the same name which aired on NBC.

Catrow has also served as a visual developer for animated films, including films such as Despicable Me and Horton Hears a Who!.

He and his wife, Deborah, live in Springfield, Ohio and have two children.

== Bibliography ==
=== As illustrator ===
- Story of Trail of Tears (1986)
- The Cataract of Lodore (1991)
- That's Good! That's Bad! (1991)
- Backstage With Clawdio (1993)
- The Bird Ladies of Boston (1995)
- She's Wearing a Dead Bird on Her Head! (1995)
- The Million-Dollar Bear (1995)
- Over the River and Through the Wood (1996)
- The Long, Long Letter (1996)
- Why Lapin's Ears Are Long: And Other Tales from the Louisiana Bayou (1997)
- Westward Ho, Carlotta! (1997)
- There Was an Old Witch (1998)
- Rotten Teeth (1998)
- The Emperor's Old Clothes (1999)
- Cesar's Amazing Journey (1999)
- Fungus That Ate My School (2000)
- How Murray Saved Christmas (2000)
- Cinderella Skeleton (2000)
- Stand Tall, Molly Lou Melon (2001)
- Plantzilla (2002)
- Take Me Out of the Bathtub and Other Silly Dilly Songs (2002)
- Santa Claustrophobia (2002)
- That's Good! That's Bad! in the Grand Canyon (2002)
- I'm Still Here in the Bathtub: Brand New Silly Dilly Songs (2003)
- Don't Take Your Snake for a Stroll (2003)
- Little Pierre: A Cajun Story from Louisiana (2003)
- The Boy Who Looked Like Lincoln (2003)
- I Like Myself! (2004)
- Lu and the Swamp Ghost (2004)
- I Wanna Iguana (2004)
- Wet Dog! (2005)
- I Ain't Gonna Paint No More! (2005)
- Our Tree Named Steve (2005)
- Where Did They Hide My Presents?: Silly Dilly Christmas Songs (2005)
- Why Did the Chicken Cross the Road? (2006)
- Plantzilla Goes to Camp (2006)
- Merry Un-Christmas (2006)
- Are You Quite Polite?: Silly Dilly Manners Songs (2006)
- Doggone Dogs (2008)
- My School's a Zoo! (2008)
- On Top of the Potty (2008)
- Dozens of Cousins (2008)
- The Boy Who Wouldn't Share (2008)
- Smelly Locker: Silly Dilly School Songs (2008)
- Going, Going, Gone!: And Other Silly Dilly Sports Songs (2009)
- The Middle-Child Blues (2009)
- Too Much Kissing!: And Other Silly Dilly Songs About Parents (2009)
- I Wanna New Room (2010)
- Jackhammer Sam (2011), written by Peter Mandel
- Mosquitoes Are Ruining My Summer!: And Other Silly Dilly Camp Songs (2011)
- Where's My T.R.U.C.K? (2011)
- Have Fun, Molly Lou Melon (2012)
- Fun in the Sun (2014)

=== As writer and illustrator ===
- Max Spaniel: Dinosaur Hunt (2009)
- Max Spaniel: Funny Lunch (2010)
- Max Spaniel: Best in Show (2011)
