= No Jumping on the Bed! =

1987 book

The cover of No Jumping on the Bed!, written and illustrated by Tedd Arnold

No Jumping on the Bed! is a children's book written and illustrated by Tedd Arnold. Published in 1987, it marked the first of the many children's books that Arnold was to both write and illustrate. No Jumping on the Bed! won the 1988 International Reading Association/Children's Book Council Children's Choice Award, the Georgia Children's Picture Storybook Award in 1990, and the Volunteer State Book Award in 1992. The book is aimed at 4-7 year olds and written in humorous rhyming prose, similar in style to that of Dr. Seuss whom Arnold acknowledges as a major influence on his work. It tells the story of Walter, a little boy whose father has told not to jump up and down on his bed. Walter dreams that he has ignored his father's warning with disastrous results. He and his bed fall through all seven floors of his apartment building, taking with them all the neighbors in the floors below.

Arnold's inspiration for the story came when he and his young family moved from Florida to an old apartment building in Yonkers, New York. His son Walter, for whom the protagonist is named, was four years old at the time and loved jumping on his bed. As Arnold writes:

"But Walter's bedroom floor was someone else's ceiling! The whole idea of apartment living was new to me back then. People living upstairs. More people living downstairs! New experiences like that seem to spark my imagination."

Arnold's oft-repeated warning to his son of "No jumping on the bed!" became the title of the book.

== Synopsis ==
Walter's father finds him jumping on his bed. He has warned Walter continuously—a zillion times-- (one too many times) to not jump on his bed ever and he still keeps on jumping. Before turning off the lights, Walter's father said, "If I have told you once, I've told you a zillion times: 'No jumping on the bed!'. One day it is going to crash right through the floor. Now lie down and go to bed". Walter asks if it can happen one more time. However, he instead (after being obedient by his father) goes back down and gets to sleep as his father asks.

Walter tries to go to sleep but hears the thumping noise (from upstairs). It reveals to be his friend Delbert in the apartment. Then he hears Delbert above jumping on his bed. At first, Walter does obey and avoids jumping on his bed. But even though Walter tries to stay away from jumping on his bed, he has a second thought. He (although trying to stay away) thinks to himself that if Delbert gets to jump on his bed, he (Walter) can too. Because of that, Walter decides to have just one more jump himself. But instead, he keeps jumping higher and higher. His hair brushed through the ceiling. After one too many jumps, the floor starts to crack. He and his bed fall into Ms. Mabel Hattie's dining room; where he lands in her plate of spaghetti and meatballs. When Ms. Mabel Hattie (called "Ms. Hattie" in this book but "Ms. Mabel Hattie" in No More Water in the Tub!) finds Walter in her plate of spaghetti, she says that she did not expect her company for dinner (with a mouthful of meatballs).

Walter and his bed continue to fall, along with Ms. Mabel Hattie and the spaghetti, into Mr. Matty's TV room where he is watching the dinosaurs on his television set. Ms. Mabel Hattie falls into Mr. Matty's lap, while Walter lands in his fish tank. Walter wanted to stay up late and watch the dinosaurs. But his bed crashed through the floor taking the television with it. The next stop for Walter's bed and the ever-growing crowd is Walter's Aunt Batty's room. Mr. Matty's TV room was above Aunt Batty's room. Aunt Batty is still unpacking from her move to her room when she sees her nephew crashing through her ceiling.

Aunt Batty's stamp collection gets scattered all over the floor. Aunt Batty and her stamps join the group as it falls into the next apartment, knocking over a castle of toy blocks that Patty and Natty have been building. Patty, Natty, and Fatty (their cat) are added to the group as it falls down into Mr. Hanratty's apartment where he is painting a picture at his easel. Walter, Ms. Mabel Hattie, Mr. Matty, Aunt Batty, Patty and Natty, Mr. Hanratty, the cat, the paint, the spaghetti, the TV (with the dinosaurs), the fish, and various toys now land in Maestro Ferlingatti's concert room where he and his string quartet are practicing. They too join the tumbling crowd who all end up safely in the dark and quiet basement of the building. The crowd (except Walter and his bed) magically vanish in the dark and quiet basement (leading Walter to be back in his own bedroom).

Suddenly, it is revealed that Maestro Ferlingatti's concert room was also the basement ceiling. At last, Walter is back in his bed (and in his own bedroom again) and realizes that it has all been a dream. Shortly later, Walter heard his parents talking. He promises himself that he is never again going to jump on his bed again (and hopes that Delbert may learn his lesson as well). Walter at last settles in for the night. But then, Walter hears Delbert jumping on the bed again. Little did he know, Delbert (who was jumping his bed), he and his bed crashed through Walter's ceiling. Delbert and his bed tumbled into Walter's bedroom. Walter soon gets a taste of his own medicine. Because Delbert has caused the disaster on him (with the first encounter Delbert sees is Walter). Down and down fell Delbert. As a result, the same things might happen in Walter's dreams for Delbert. The same things may happen in Walter's dreams. But it is not going to be Walter that causes it (nor is it going to be Walter who gets in trouble).

== Characters (in order of appearance) ==
- Walter
- Walter's father
- Ms. Mabel Hattie
- Mr. Matty
- Aunt Batty
- Patty and Natty and their cat Fatty
- Mr. Hanratty
- Maestro Ferlingatti
- Delbert, Walter's friend

== Bibliographic information ==
- Tedd Arnold, No Jumping on the Bed!, New York: Dial Books for Young Readers, 1987. Illustrated by Tedd Arnold, 32 pages. ISBN 0-8037-0038-5
- Tedd Arnold, No Se Salta en la Cama!, (Spanish language edition, translated by Osvaldo Blanco), New York: Dial Books for Young Readers, Penguin Ediciones, 1997. Illustrated by Tedd Arnold, 32 pages. ISBN 0-8037-2068-8

There have been 14 later editions of the book in English, including a board book with simplified text for very young children. (Imprints for the later editions include Puffin and Scholastic Inc.). The Scholastic cassette has the music by Richard DeRosa and the narration by Ron Marshall.

== Notes and references ==
- Children's Literature Comprehensive Database (CLCD), Children's Literature Reviews: No Jumping on the Bed!. Retrieved September 25, 2008.
- Keller, James, The Big Book of Picture-Book Authors & Illustrators, Scholastic, 2001, pp. 10–11. ISBN 0-439-20154-3
- McElmeel, Sharron L., Children's Authors and Illustrators Too Good to Miss: Biographical Sketches and Bibliographies, Libraries Unlimited, 2004, pp. 6–10. ISBN 1-59158-027-7
