= Christopher Award =

Annual media award

The Christopher Award (established 1949) is presented to the producers, directors, and writers of books, films and television specials that "affirm the highest values of the human spirit". It is given by The Christophers, a Christian organization founded in 1945 by the Maryknoll priest James Keller.

== Judging process ==
Publishers, TV networks, and film directors are asked to submit titles and work that they believe to be award-worthy. Industry professionals and Christopher staff members make the final selections based on:

1. Artistic and technical proficiency
2. Significant degree of public acceptance
3. Affirmation of the highest values of the human spirit

== Categories ==
- Christopher Leadership Awards
- Christopher Life Achievement Award
- Christopher Spirit Award
- James Keller Award
- Books for Adults
- Books for Young People
- Feature Films
- Television & Cable

== Selection of previous winners/honorees ==
=== Christopher Leadership Awards ===
- 2002 Rudy Giuliani
- 2004 Father John T. Catoir
- 2005 Sargent Shriver
- 2008 Cardinal John Patrick Foley
- 2011 Scotty Smiley

=== Christopher Life Achievement Award ===
- 2003 Mary Higgins Clark
- 2004 Art Linkletter
- 2005 Robert Coles
- 2006 Dave Brubeck
- 2008 David McCullough
- 2012 Mother Dolores Hart
- 2016 Ernie Anastos
- 2018 Ken Burns

=== Christopher Spirit Award ===
- 2016 When Calls the Heart

=== James Keller Award ===
- 2004 Caroll Spinney
- 2005 Pat LaFontaine
- 2011 Shannon Hickey
- 2012 Marty Lyons

=== Books for Adults ===
1987

- Kaffir Boy: The True Story of a Black Youth's Coming of Age in Apartheid South Africa

2001

- Aging with Grace, by David Snowdon, PhD (Bantam Books)
- Choosing Mercy, by Antoinette Bosco (Orbis Books)
- Freedom's Daughters, by Lynne Olson (Scribner)
- An Hour Before Daylight, by Jimmy Carter (Simon & Schuster)
- John Adams, by David McCullough (Simon & Schuster)
- Nickel and Dimed, by Barbara Ehrenreich (Metropolitan Books/Henry Holt and Company, LLC)

2002

- Aging with Grace by David Snowdon, PhD
- Choosing Mercy by Antoinette Bosco
- Freedom's Daughters by Lynne Olson
- An Hour Before Daylight by Jimmy Carter
- John Adams by David McCullough
- Nickel and Dimed by Barbara Ehrenreich

2003

- Choosing Naia: A Family’s Journey by Mitchell Zuckoff
- The Day the World Came to Town: 9/11 in Gander, Newfoundland by Jim DeFede
- Fatal Passage: The Story of John Rae, The Arctic Hero Time Forgot by Ken McGoogan
- Five Past Midnight in Bhopal by Dominique Lapierre & Javier Moro
- Jim's Last Summer: Lessons on Living from a Dying Priest by Teresa Rhodes McGee
- Standing on Holy Ground: A Triumph Over Hate Crime in the Deep South by Sandra E. Johnson

2004

- A Human Being Died That Night by Pumla Gobodo-Madikizela
- If I Get to Five by Fred Epstein, M.D., & Joshua Horwitz
- The Life You Save May Be Your Own: An American Pilgrimage by Paul Elie
- My Heart Will Cross This Ocean: My Story, My Son, Amadou by Kadiatou Diallo & Craig Wolff
- My Path Leads to Tibet by Sabriye Tenberken
- Sisters: Catholic Nuns and the Making of America by John J. Fialka
- Triangle: The Fire That Changed America by David Von Drehle

2005

- Anatomy of Hope by Jerome Groopman, M.D.
- Blood Done Sign My Name by Timothy Tyson
- The Freedom Line by Peter Eisner
- I Am a Pencil: A Teacher, His Kids, and Their World of Stories by Sam Swope
- Love in the Driest Season: A Family Memoir by Neely Tucker
- Mao's Last Dancer: A Memoir by Li Cunxin

2006

- The Death of Innocents: An Eyewitness Account of Wrongful Executions by Sister Helen Prejean
- The Glass Castle by Jeannette Walls
- One Soldier's Story: A Memoir by Bob Dole
- The Prison Angel: Mother Antonia’s Journey from Beverly Hills to a Life of Service in a Mexican Jail by Mary Jordan & Kevin Sullivan
- They Poured Fire on Us From the Sky by Benson Deng, Alephonsion Deng & Benjamin Ajak, with Judy A. Bernstein

2007

- Barefootin': Life Lessons from the Road to Freedom by Unita Blackwell with JoAnne Prichard Morris
- Enrique's Journey by Sonia Nazario
- The Language of God: A Scientist Presents Evidence for Belief by Francis Collins
- Left to Tell: Discovering God Amidst the Rwandan Holocaust by Immaculée Ilibagiza with Steve Erwin
- The Lemon Tree: An Arab, a Jew, and the Heart of the Middle East by Sandy Tolan
- My Life with the Saints by James Martin

2008

- Brother, I'm Dying by Edwidge Danticat
- The Florist's Daughter by Patricia Hempl
- The Invisible Wall: A Love Story That Broke Barriers by Harry Bernstein
- The Lonely Patient: How We Experience Illness by Michael Stein, M.D.
- A Long Way Gone: Memoirs of a Boy Soldier by Ishmael Beah
- A Slave No More: Two Men Who Escaped to Freedom by David W. Blight

2009

- Alex & Me by Irene Pepperberg
- American-Made—The Enduring Legacy of the WPA: When FDR Put the Nation to Work by Nick Taylor
- Final Salute: A Story of Unfinished Lives by Jim Sheeler
- Founding Faith: Providence, Politics, and the Birth of Religious Freedom in America by Steven Waldman
- The Soloist: A Lost Dream, an Unlikely Friendship, and the Redemptive Power of Music by Steve Lopez
- Until Our Last Breath: A Holocaust Story of Love and Partisan Resistance by Michael Bart and Laurel Corona

2010

- A. Lincoln: A Biography by Ronald C. White, Jr.
- Stones into Schools by Greg Mortenson
- Strength in What Remains by Tracy Kidder
- Wrestling with Moses: How Jane Jacobs Took on New York's Master Builder and Transformed the American City by Anthony Flint

2011

- Bonhoeffer: Pastor, Martyr, Prophet, Spy by Eric Metaxas
- The Jesuit Guide to (Almost) Everything by James Martin
- Thea's Song: The Life of Thea Bowman by Charlene Smith and John Feister
- Unbroken: A World War II Story of Survival, Resilience, and Redemption by Laura Hillenbrand
- Washington: A Life by Ron Chernow

2012

- A Good and Perfect Gift by Julia Becker
- An Invisible Thread by Laura Schroff and Alex Tresniowski
- I Shall Not Hate by Izzeldin Abuelaish
- Kisses from Katie by Katie Davis and Beth Clark
- Little Princes by Conor Grennan

2013

- Carly’s Voice by Arthur Fleischmann and Carly Fleischmann
- Fearless by Eric Blehm
- A Good Man by Mark Shriver
- My Sisters the Saints by Colleen Carroll Campbell
- Road to Valor by Aili and Andres McConnon

2014

- American Story: A Lifetime Search for Ordinary People Doing Extraordinary Things by Bob Dotson (Viking Press/Penguin Group)
- Love and Salt: A Spiritual Friendship Shared in Letters by Amy Andrews and Jessica Mesman Griffith (Loyola Press)
- The Miracle of Father Kapaun: Priest, Soldier, and Korean War Hero by Roy Wenzl and Travis Heying (Ignatius Press)
- On These Courts: A Miracle Season That Changed a City, a Once-Future Star, and a Team Forever by Wayne B. Drash (Touchstone Books/Simon and Schuster)
- Walk In Their Shoes: Can One Person Change the World? by Jim Ziolkowski with James S. Hirsch (Simon and Schuster)

2015

- The Invisible Front: Love and Loss in an Era of Endless War by Yochi Dreazen (Crown Publishers).

2016

- Five Years in Heaven: The Unlikely Friendship That Answered Life’s Greatest Questions by John Schlimm (Image Books/Crown Publishing)
- The Gift of Caring: Saving Our Parents from the Perils of Modern Healthcare by Marcy Cottrell Houle and Elizabeth Eckstrom (Taylor Trade Publishing/Rowman & Littlefield)
- One Righteous Man: Samuel Battle and the Shattering of the Color Line in New York by Arthur Browne (Beacon Press)
- Tough As They Come by Travis Mills with Marcus Brotherton (Convergent Books/Crown Publishing)
- Under the Same Sky: From Starvation in North Korea to Salvation in America by Joseph Kim with Stephan Talty (Houghton Mifflin Harcourt)
- The Wind in the Reeds: A Storm, a Play, and the City That Would Not Be Broken by Wendell Pierce (Riverhead Books/Random House)

=== Books for Young People ===
2001

- Ages 6–8: How Do Dinosaurs Say Good Night? by Jane Yolen, illustrated by Mark Teague (The Blue Sky Press/Scholastic Inc.)
- Ages 9–10: The Mousery by Charlotte Pomerantz, illustrated by Kurt Cyrus (Gulliver Books/Harcourt, Inc.)
- Ages 11–12: The Yellow Star by Carmen Agra Deedy, illustrated by Henri Sørensen (Peachtree Publishers, Ltd.)
- Ages 11–12: Hope Was Here by Joan Bauer (G. P. Putnam's Sons)
- Young Adult: The Wanderer by Sharon Creech (Joanna Cotler Books/HarperCollins Publishers)

2002

- Kiss Good Night by Amy Hest with illustrations by Anita Jeram
- Ages 6–8: Beatrice's Goat by Page McBrier with illustrations by Lori Lohstoeter
- Ages 8–10: Love That Dog by Sharon Creech
- Ages 10–12: Uncle Daddy by Ralph Fletcher
- Young Adult: Soldier X by Don L. Wulffson and Witness by Karen Hesse

2003

- People Mole and the Baby Bird by Marjorie Newman with illustrations by Patrick Benson
- Ages 6–8: Dear Mrs. Larue: Letters from Obedience School written and illustrated by Mark Teague
- Ages 8–10: The Ugly Princess and the Wise Fool by Margaret Gray with illustrations by Randy Cecil
- Ages 10–12: Pictures of Hollis Woods by Patricia Reilly Giff
- Young Adult: Left for Dead by Pete Nelson

2004

- Preschool: Little Bear’s Little Boat by Eve Bunting with illustrations by Nancy Carpenter
- Ages 6–8: The Dot written and illustrated by Peter H. Reynolds
- Ages 8–10: Harvesting Hope: The Story of Cesar Chavez by Kathleen Krull with illustrations by Yuyi Morales
- Ages 10–12: Iqbal by Francesco D’Adamo
- Young Adult: The Silent Boy by Lois Lowry

2005

- Preschool: Never, Ever Shout in a Zoo by Karma Wilson with illustrations by Doug Cushman
- Ages 6–8: The Hungry Coat: A Tale from Turkey written and illustrated by Demi
- Ages 8–10: Shredderman: Secret Identity by Wendelin Van Draanen with illustrations by Brian Biggs
- Ages 10–12: The Teacher's Funeral: A Comedy in Three Parts by Richard Peck
- Young Adult: Thura’s Diary: My Life in Wartime Iraq by Thura Al Windawi

2006

- Preschool: Am I a Color Too? by Heidi Cole & Nancy Vogl with illustrations by Gerald Purnell (Preschool)
- Ages 6–8: I Could Do That! Esther Morris Gets Women the Vote by Linda Arms White with illustrations by Nancy Carpenter
- Ages 8–10: Game Day by Tiki Barber and Ronde Barber with Robert Burleigh, illustrations by Barry Root
- Ages 10–12: Friendship According to Humphrey by Betty G. Birney
- Young Adult: Hitch by Jeanette Ingold

2007

- Preschool: Hero Cat by Eileen Spinelli with illustrations by Jo Ellen McAllister Stammen
- Ages 6–8: How We Are Smart by W. Nikola-Lisa with illustrations by Sean Qualls
- Ages 8–10: The Miraculous Journey of Edward Tulane by Kate DiCamillo with illustrations by Bagram Ibatoulline
- Ages 10–12: Listen! by Stephanie S. Tolan
- Young Adult: Bread and Roses, Too by Katherine Paterson

2008

- Preschool: Taking a Bath with the Dog and Other Things That Make Me Happy by Scott Menchin
- Ages 6–8: How Many Seeds in a Pumpkin? by Margaret McNamara with illustrations by G. Brian Karas
- Ages 8–10: Owen & Mzee: The Language of Friendship by Isabella Hatkoff, Craig Hatkoff, and Dr. Paula Kahumbu with photographs by Peter Greste
- Ages 10–12: The Wild Girls by Pat Murphy
- Young Adult: Diamonds in the Shadow by Caroline B. Cooney

2009

- Preschool: Close to You: How Animals Bond by Kimiko Kajikawa
- Ages 6–8: That Book Woman by Heather Henson with illustrations by David Small
- Ages 8–10: Clementine's Letter by Sara Pennypacker with illustrations by Marla Frazee
- Ages 10–12: Shooting the Moon by Frances O’Roark Dowell
- Young Adult: Sunrise Over Fallujah by Walter Dean Myers

2010

- Preschool: Ten Days and Nine Nights: An Adoption Story by Yumi Heo
- Ages 6–8: Nubs: The True Story of a Mutt, a Marine & a Miracle by Major Brian Dennis, Kirby Larson, & Mary Nethery
- Ages 8–10: Most Loved in All the World by Tonya Cherie Hegamin with illustrations by Cozbi A. Cabrera
- Ages 10–12: Extra Credit by Andrew Clements with illustrations by Mark Elliott
- Young Adult: A Pearl in the Storm: How I Found My Heart in the Middle of the Ocean by Tori Murden

2011

- Knuffle Bunny Free: An Unexpected Diversion by Mo Willems
- Would You Still Love Me If... by Wendy LaGuardia with illustrations by Patricia Keeler
- Brother Jerome and the Angels in the Bakery by Father Dominic Garramone
- Lafayette and the American Revolution by Russell Freedman

2012

- Shine: Choices to Make God Smile by Genny Monchamp with illustrations by Karol Kaminski
- Waiting for the Biblioburro by Monica Brown with illustrations by John Parra
- You Can Be a Friend by Tony Dungy and Lauren Dungy with illustrations by Ron Mazellan
- Hooper Finds a Family by Jane Paley
- Words in the Dust by Trent Reedy
- Close to Famous by Joan Bauer

2013

- Forever You: A Book About Your Soul and Body by Nicole Lataif with illustrations by Mary Rojas
- The Fantastic Flying Books of Mr. Morris Lessmore by William Joyce with illustrations by Joe Bluhm
- The House on Dirty-Third Street by Jo S. Kittinger with illustrations by Thomas Gonzalez
- The One and Only Ivan by Katherine Applegate with illustrations by Patricia Castelao
- Wonder by R.J. Palacio
- Outcasts United by Warren St. John

2014

- Preschool and up: Maya Was Grumpy written and illustrated by Courtney Pippin-Mathur (Flashlight Press)
- Kindergarten and up: Year of the Jungle: Memories from the Home Front by Suzanne Collins, illustrated by James Proimos (Scholastic Press)
- Ages 6 and up: The Matchbox Diary by Paul Fleischman, illustrated by Bagram Ibatoulline (Candlewick Press)
- Ages 8 and up: Flora & Ulysses by Kate DiCamillo, illustrated by K.G. Campbell (Candlewick Press)
- Ages 10 and up: The Boy On the Wooden Box by Leon Leyson with Marilyn J. Harran and Elisabeth B. Leyson (Atheneum Books for Young Readers/Simon and Schuster Children's Publishing)

2016

- Preschool and up: One Good Deed by Terri Fields, illustrated by Deborah Melmon (Kar-Ben Publishing)
- Kindergarten and up: An Invisible Thread Christmas Story by Laura Schroff and Alex Tresniowski, illustrated by Barry Root (Little Simon/Simon & Schuster)
- Ages 6 and up: Poet: The Remarkable Story of George Moses Horton by Don Tate (Peachtree Publishers)
- Ages 8 and up: Katie’s Cabbage by Katie Stagliano with Michelle H. Martin, illustrated by Karen Heid (Young Palmetto Books/University of South Carolina Press)
- Ages 10 and up: Firefly Hollow by Alison McGhee, illustrated by Christopher Denise (Atheneum Books for Young Readers/Simon & Schuster)
- Young Adult: Paper Hearts by Meg Wiviott (Margaret K. McElderry Books/Simon & Schuster)

=== Feature films ===
1953

- Peter Pan

1983

- Testament

2001

- Billy Elliot
- Cast Away
- Finding Forrester
- My Dog Skip
- Remember the Titans

2002

- A Beautiful Mind
- Iris
- Shrek
- The Widow of Saint-Pierre

2003

- About a Boy
- Antwone Fisher
- Evelyn
- Rabbit-Proof Fence
- Signs
- Spirited Away

2004

- In America
- Seabiscuit
- Secret Lives: Hidden Children and Their Rescuers During WWII
- The Station Agent
- Whale Rider

2005

- Finding Neverland
- Hotel Rwanda
- The Incredibles
- Miracle

2006

- Good Night, and Good Luck
- Mad Hot Ballroom
- Millions
- An Unfinished Life
- The Wild Parrots of Telegraph Hill

2007

- Akeelah and the Bee
- Charlotte's Web
- Miss Potter
- The Nativity Story
- Sophie Scholl – The Final Days
- Water
- World Trade Center

2008

- Amazing Grace
- The Diving Bell and the Butterfly
- The Great Debaters
- Juno
- The Kite Runner
- Ratatouille

2009

- Changeling
- The Secret Life of Bees
- Slumdog Millionaire
- The Visitor
- WALL-E
- Young@Heart

2010

- The Blind Side
- Invictus
- Up

2011

- The Human Experience
- The King's Speech
- Toy Story 3
- Secretariat

2012

- Buck
- The Help
- The Muppets
- Of Gods and Men
- War Horse
- The Way

2013

- Lincoln
- Les Misérables
- Undefeated

2014

- 42
- Frozen
- Gimme Shelter
- Gravity

2015

- The American Nurse
- Selma
- St. Vincent

2016

- Creed
- The Drop Box
- The Martian
- Room

2017

- Hacksaw Ridge
- Hidden Figures
- The Hollars
- Queen of Katwe

2018

- Darkest Hour
- Lady Bird
- The Star
- Wonder

2019

- Ben is Back
- Instant Family
- Paul, Apostle of Christ
- Won't You Be My Neighbor?

=== Television and Cable ===
1978

- Richard and Esther Shapiro, for Minstrel Man
- Jerry McNeely, for Something for Joey
- Bill Moyers, Tom Spain, for "CBS Reports: The Fire Next Door"
- Anthony Burgess, Franco Zeffirelli, Suso Cecchi D'Amico, for Jesus of Nazareth
- Theodore J. Flicker, Allan Balter, for Just a Little Inconvenience
- W. W. Lewis, for Tut: The Boy King
- Romeo Muller, for The Hobbit
- Caryl Ledner, for Mary White
- James Poe, for The Gathering

2016

- ABC News 20/20: Escaping ISIS (ABC News)
- America ReFramed: If You Build It (World Channel/PBS)
- Dolly Parton's Coat of Many Colors (NBC)
- The Jim Gaffigan Show: My Friend the Priest (TV Land)
- Tashi and the Monk (HBO)
