= Ordinary Things =

Ordinary Things may refer to:

- Ordinary Things: Poems from a Walk in Early Spring, a book of poems by Ralph Fletcher, 1997
- "Ordinary Things" (song), by Lukas Graham, 2011
- "Ordinary Things", a song by Plexi from Cheer Up, 1996
- "Ordinary Things", a song by Ariana Grande featuring Nonna from Eternal Sunshine, 2024
- "The Ordinary Things", a song from the musical Through a Glass, Darkly
