= Maraire =

Maraire is a surname. Notable people with the surname include:

- Chiwoniso Maraire (1976–2013), Zimbabwean singer-songwriter and musician
- Dumisani Maraire (1944–1999), Zimbabwean musician
- J. Nozipo Maraire (born 1964), Zimbabwean doctor and writer
