= Spider-Boy (disambiguation) =

Spider-Boy is a Marvel Comics character.

Spider-Boy, or Spider Boy, may also refer to:

- Spider-Boy (Amalgam Comics), an Amalgam Comics character who is an amalgam of Ben Reilly and Superboy
- Spider Boy (novel), a 1997 young adult novel by Ralph Fletcher
