= Lemon Tree =

Lemon Tree may refer to:

- Lemon (Citrus limon), a tree bearing fruit
- Lemon myrtle (Backhousia citriodora), an Australian native tree with a distinct lemon smell

== Places in Australia ==
- Lemon Tree, New South Wales
- Lemon Tree Passage, New South Wales
- Lemontree, Queensland

== Film, music and literature ==
- Lemon Tree (2008 film), a film by director Eran Riklis
- Lemon Tree (2023 film), a film by director Rachel Walden
- The Lemon Tree (album), an album by Daryl Braithwaite
- "Lemon Tree" (Will Holt song), a song made popular by Trini Lopez
- "Lemon Tree" (Fool's Garden song), a song by Fool's Garden
- "Lemon Tree", a song by Post Malone from Twelve Carat Toothache
- "(Here We Go Round) the Lemon Tree", a song by the Move
- The Lemon Trees, a 1990s UK pop band
- "Lemon of Troy", an episode of The Simpsons featuring the theft of Springfield's Lemon Tree
- The Lemon Tree, an arts venue in Aberdeen, Scotland
- The Lemon Tree: An Arab, a Jew, and the Heart of the Middle East, a book by Sandy Tolan

== See also ==
- Lemon (disambiguation)
