= Relatively Speaking =

Relatively Speaking may refer to:

In arts and literature:

- Relatively Speaking (Ayckbourn play), by Alan Ayckbourn
- Relatively Speaking (play anthology), a Broadway anthology
- Relatively Speaking: Poems about Family, a 1999 young adult book of poetry by Ralph Fletcher

In music:

- "Relatively Speaking", a song from the album Seasons of the Heart by John Denver
- "Relatively Speaking", a song from the 2008 album Shiny Shady People by 3rd Alley

In other uses:

- "Relatively Speaking", a track from the 1962 comedy album The First Family by Vaughn Meader
- Relatively Speaking (game show), a 1980s game show
- Relatively Speaking (journal), the official journal of the Alberta Genealogical Society
