= Soldier Boys =

Book by Dean Hughes

- Front cover of Soldier Boys
- Author: Dean Hughes
- Illustrator: Kim McGillivray
- Cover artist: Kim McGillivray
- Language: English
- Series: none
- Subject: World War II
- Genre: Historical Fiction, Action
- Publisher: Simon Pulse (Teen)
- Publication date: May 1, 2003
- Publication place: United States & Germany
- Media type: Print (softcover, digital media)
- Pages: 230
- ISBN: 0-689-86021-8
- OCLC: 52047697
- Preceded by: none
- Followed by: none

Soldier Boys is a 2001 novel by writer Dean Hughes. The story is set during World War II and tells the story of two teenagers, one American, the other German, who join their respective armies and fight at the Battle of the Bulge.

== Main characters ==
Spencer Morgan, 16 years old, drops out of his Utah high school to begin training as a paratrooper. He's seen how boys who weren't much in high school can come home heroes, and Spence wants to prove to his friends and family that he really can be something. He also wants to get LeAnn's attention.

Fifteen-year-old Dieter Hedrick's blind devotion sees him promoted from the Hitler Youth into the German Army. Dieter is determined to prove his bravery and patriotism at all costs.

== Setting ==
This book takes place during World War II in Western Germany and Brigham City, Utah, USA. A small portion of the book also takes place in other parts of America and discusses various locations in Utah and the United States as training camps.

== Plot ==
Dieter Hedrick, once a small and timid person, over time becomes a member of an anti-aircraft gun battery that scores at least one kill during Allied bombing raids. Moving steadily higher in rank in the Hitler Youth (in German Hitlerjugend, abbreviated HJ), Dieter is promoted to lead a group of 180 boys, who are part of the enormous project to build the Westwall (Siegfried Line) before the Allies arrive. Two fellow HJ's are less fortunate: Ernst Gessel is killed when a British Spitfire fighter strafes the site, and Willi Hoffmann is shot for attempting to desert. Dieter proves himself to be a capable leader, and he, along with a few other HJ leaders meet Adolf Hitler and Albert Speer and are decorated for their contributions to the German war effort. Dieter is anxious to fight and, following other senior HJ's, goes into the Wehrmacht. Assigned to a unit that is demoralized and badly understrength, Dieter meets Johann Schaefer, a weary soldier whose cynical attitude contrasts sharply with Dieter's blind, fiery patriotism. Schaefer had a son, an HJ, who was killed while manning an AA gun in an Allied bombing raid and has seen far more of the war than Dieter, being a veteran of Stalingrad. He constantly criticizes Dieter's blind devotion to Hitler, truthfully saying that the war is lost for Germany and that simply living to see the end of it is the best thing any German soldier can hope for. Despite their constant arguing, Dieter gradually begins to form a father-son relationship with Schaefer.

In December 1944, Spence and Dieter are both sent into the snow-covered forests of the Ardennes as Germany mounts a major offensive. When both boys kill their first enemy, they react differently. Dieter is proud to have killed an enemy of Germany, while Spence is far less enthusiastic. As fighting continues, both sides suffer losses. Ted Draney and half of Spence's company are killed after being ambushed by two Tiger I tanks and German infantry. Later, Dieter boasts of having shot several of the American infantry. Schaefer then tells Dieter of his disillusionment with the Nazi cause, having learned of the Holocaust while recuperating in Warsaw from his wounds on the Eastern front, and reveals that he deliberately aimed beneath the American soldiers. Overnight, the Americans bring up reinforcements, with the result that when the Germans attack them again the next day, they are going up against a force much stronger than they expected.

When the Germans advance on the Americans' positions, Dieter charges up the hill, making it further than anyone else, but is shot several times and is left by the surviving men of his unit as they retreat. Schaefer is killed but Dieter, unaware of this, begins to call for him with increasing desperation as the night goes on. A group of German medics attempt to retrieve Dieter, but retreat after one of their number is shot by a careless young GI. Spence, against orders from Sergeant Pappas, his squad leader, decides to crawl out onto the open ground where the Germans lost in the charge had fallen. Dieter, realizing an American has reached him, initially tries to push Spence away and cannot understand Spence asking him where he is wounded, or telling Dieter he is there to help. Spence persists, however, and uses equipment carried by the dead German medic to bandage Dieter's wounds. Dieter gradually calms down, his pain and fatigue having made him delusional. He alternately believes that Spence is actually a German soldier, there to aid a wounded comrade, or that Spence is Schaefer, who has finally come to save him. In the moments where he realizes Spence is American, Dieter is confused; his leaders had always told him that Americans were cruel and inhuman criminals, incapable of such a compassionate act.

As Spence tries to get Dieter back to his own lines so he can reach medics, he is shot by German soldiers, who have decided to come get him, saying later that they could no longer stand to hear his cries for help. They assumed Spence was trying to take Dieter prisoner and thus acted to stop him. Fatally wounded, Spence soon dies on the hill. Taken to a field hospital, Dieter learns what happened to him, the American who helped him, and Schaefer. As Dieter and a sergeant from his unit await transfer from the front lines to undergo surgery, Dieter's blind patriotism begins to fade. Unable to ignore the significance of what Spence, an enemy, did for him, Dieter realizes he will think about Spence for the rest of his life.

Back in the United States, a funeral is held for Spence, and a letter arrives for his parents from Sergeant Pappas. Learning that their son gave up his life to save a German, the Morgans decide against revealing this to friends and relatives, since hatred for Germans is running high and the significance of the act would not be properly understood. But they remember how Spence said that in going to war, he would not compromise any of his principles- a promise he ultimately kept.

== See also ==
- Battle of the Bulge
- Dean Hughes
- Soldier X
- Nazi
