= Biira =

Biira is a surname. Notable people with the surname include:

- Beatrice Biira, Ugandan human rights activist, subject of Beatrice's Goat
- Joy Doreen Biira (born 1986), Ugandan journalist and communications consultant
