= Judy A. Bernstein =

American author

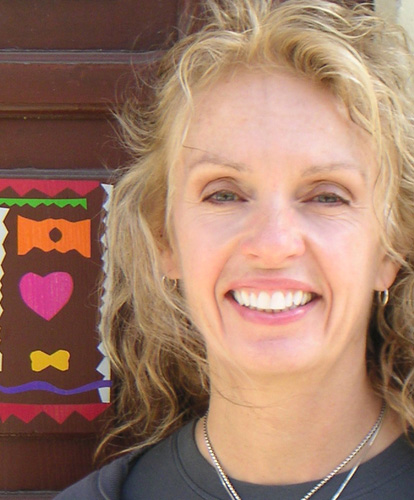
- Born: San Diego, California, US
- Education: San Diego State University
- Occupation: Author
- Spouse(s): Paul E. Bernstein, MD
- Children: 1
- Writing career
- Period: 1997–present
- Genres: non-fiction, historical
- Notable works: They Poured Fire on Us From the Sky: The True Story of Three Lost Boys of Sudan; Disturbed In Their Nests
- Website: theypouredfirebooks.com

Judith A. Bernstein is an American author who has worked extensively with refugees of the Sudanese civil war and co-authored two books recounting their personal experiences. They Poured Fire on Us From the Sky: The True Story of Three Lost Boys of Sudan, was written with Sudanese brothers Alephonsion Deng and Benson Deng, and their cousin Benjamin Ajak and published in 2005. A follow-up book, Disturbed in Their Nests: A Journey from Sudan's Dinkaland to San Diego's City Heights, was written with Alephonsion Deng and published in 2018.

== Early life and career ==
Bernstein [nee Helmuth] was born in San Diego and grew up in the city. She married Paul Bernstein, a medical school student, in 1972. After majoring in math at San Diego State University, she worked in the computer field for nearly 20 years. She then served as a graduate student advisor for the community economic development program at San Diego State University.

== Books ==
In 2001, Bernstein was volunteering as a mentor for the San Diego International Rescue Committee (IRC) when she was introduced to three teenaged boys—Benson Deng, Alephonsion Deng and Benjamin Ajak—who had been forced to flee their villages as young children in the 1980s during the Sudanese civil war. After many years in refugee camps, they had made their way to the U.S. Bernstein agreed to mentor them and also help improve their English skills. She learned of their journey of survival through the short stories and poetry they wrote and encouraged them to share their experiences with the public. Working together, the four wrote They Poured Fire on Us From the Sky: The True Story of Three Lost Boys from Sudan, which was published in 2005.

Bernstein and Alephonsion Deng collaborated on a second book, Disturbed In Their Nests: A Journey from Sudan's Dinkaland to San Diego's City Heights, that recounts Deng's early experiences in America. It was published in 2018.

== Personal life ==
Bernstein is married to Paul Bernstein, MD, a retired physician, and lives in north San Diego County. They have one son, Cliff. She has served on the Advisory Committee of the San Diego International Rescue Committee and she co-founded the IRC Lost Boys Education Fund. She contributes her time to San Diego nonprofit organizations A Bridge for Kids, Women's Empowerment International and ECOLIFE Conservation. Bernstein continues to write and edit as a member of two groups: the De Luz Writers and the Asilomar Writers Group.

== Awards ==
The two titles Bernstein has co-written have been the recipient of numerous awards.

They Poured Fire on Us From the Sky: The True Story of Three Lost Boys of Sudan:

- Christopher Award Winner for Adult Books
- The Washington Post Top 100 Books of 2005
- American Library Association "Many Voices" Honoree
- Los Angeles Times Bestseller July 2005.
- American Booksellers Association Book Sense Selection May 2005.
- National Conflict Resolution Center Peacemakers Award
- Book Sense Summer 2006 Paperback Selection
- American Library Association List - Becoming an American

- San Diego Union Tribune Warwick's Top Seller September 2015 (10th Anniversary Edition)

Disturbed in Their Nests

- 2018 Nautilus Gold Award winner, in the category of Multicultural and Indigenous Books
