= Buried Alive =

Buried alive refers to a premature burial.

== Film and television ==
- Buried Alive (1939 film), film directed by Victor Halperin
- Buried Alive (1949 film), a 1949 Italian historical drama film
- Buried Alive (1990 theatrical film), directed by Gerard Kikoine, based on the Edgar Allan Poe story
- Buried Alive (1990 TV film), a television film directed by Frank Darabont
  - Buried Alive II (1997), its sequel
- Buried Alive (2007 film), a horror film by Robert Kurtzman
- Buried Alive (talk show), an Irish television show
- Aziz Ansari: Buried Alive (2013), a 2013 comedy special that premiered on Netflix

== Literature ==
- Buried Alive (novel), by Arnold Bennett
- Buried Alive (play), by Leo Tolstoy
- Buried Alive!, a 1998 children's novel by Jacqueline Wilson
- Buried Alive: The Biography of Janis Joplin (1943–1970), biography of Janis Joplin by Myra Friedman
- Buried Alive: The Elements of Love, a 1996 young adult book of poetry by Ralph Fletcher

== Music ==
- Buried Alive (band), a metalcore band from Buffalo, New York
- Buried Alive (video), a 2009 concert music video by Hanoi Rocks

=== Albums ===
- Buried Alive (Änglagård album), 1996
- Buried Alive, a 2006 live album by Sentenced
- Buried Alive: Live in Maryland, a 2006 album by The New Barbarians

=== Songs ===
- "Buried Alive" (Avenged Sevenfold song), 2010
- "Buried Alive" (Dropkick Murphys song), 2003
- "Buried Alive", by Alter Bridge from Blackbird (2007)
- "Buried Alive", by Black Sabbath from Dehumanizer (1992)
- "Buried Alive", by Flobots from Noenemies (2017)
- "Buried Alive", by Front Line Assembly from Artificial Soldier (2006)
- "Buried Alive", by Hypocrisy from Abducted (1996)
- "Buried Alive", by Logic from Under Pressure (2014)
- "Buried Alive", by Motörhead from Motörizer (2008)
- "Buried Alive", by Axel Rudi Pell from Tales of the Crown (2008)
- "Buried Alive", by Venom from Black Metal (1982)
- "Buried Alive", by War of Ages from Alpha (2017)
- "Buried Alive", by Rick Wakeman & Ozzy Osbourne from Return to the Centre of the Earth (1999)
- "Buried Alive (Interlude)", by Drake featuring Kendrick Lamar from Take Care (2011)

== Other uses ==
- Buried Alive (performance), performance art series by monochrom
- Buried Alive (non-profit organization), a criminal justice reform advocacy organization
- Buried Alive match, a type of professional wrestling match
- In Your House 11: Buried Alive, a professional wrestling pay-per-view event produced by the World Wrestling Federation
- Buried Alive, a fictitious Pokémon creepypasta character associated with the Lavender Town Syndrome creepypastas.
