= Have You Been to the Beach Lately? =

2001 book by Ralph Fletcher

- Hardcover first edition
- Author: Ralph Fletcher
- Publisher: Orchard Books
- Publication date: April 1, 2001
- Media type: Print (Hardcover)
- Pages: 48
- ISBN: 978-0-531-30330-6
- OCLC: 45008643
- Dewey Decimal: 811/.54 21
- LC Class: PS3556.L523 H38 2001

Have You Been to the Beach Lately? is a young adult book of poetry by Ralph Fletcher with photographs by Andrea Sperling. It was first published in 2001.

== Summary ==
Thirty three first person poems that describe various moments during an eleven-year-old boy's day at the beach. He builds sand walls, plays in the surf with his friends, and teases his little brother.

== Reception ==
Trevelyn E. Jones in his review for School Library Journal called it a "perceptive and witty look into the 11-year-old heart" and that "both boys and girls will enjoy this accessible yet artful book. Perfect for use with creative-writing groups." Melinda Miller-Widrick in her review for Book Report called it "another well-done collection of poems focused on a specific topic" and that "all come together nicely to give readers a realistic view of all that goes on at the beach from the time of arrival through the drive home at night. The b&w photos complement the text very well and many add just the right background for the poems. Written mostly in free verse, these poems demonstrate that good poetry does not have to rhyme."
