= A Writing Kind of Day =

A Writing Kind of Day: Poems for Young Poets
- Hardcover first edition
- Author: Ralph Fletcher
- Illustrator: April Ward
- Publisher: Boyds Mills Press
- Publication date: April 2005
- Media type: Print (Hardcover)
- Pages: 32
- ISBN: 978-1-59078-276-7
- OCLC: 58558503
- Dewey Decimal: 811/.54 22
- LC Class: PS3556.L523 W75 2005

A Writing Kind of Day: Poems for Young Poets is a young adult book of poetry by Ralph Fletcher, illustrated by April Ward. It was first published in 2005.

== Summary ==
A young writer's experiences are described in twenty seven mostly free verse poems. Topics included are roadkill, Venus Flytraps, and a grandmothers senility. Others discuss snow angels, little brothers, and "Ma".

== Reception ==
Sharon R. Strock in her review for Library Media Connection said "Powerful words. Thinking words. Poetic words. As readers go through Ralph Fletcher’s book, they step into worlds far away—worlds found in their imaginations, their memories, and their hearts." And that "the poems are enhanced with equally intriguing b&w photos and drawings that are simple, curious, humorous, and magical. The cover with the only color found in the book doesn’t match the content, which is disappointing." Jennifer Mattson in her review for Booklist said that the poems in the book "subvert the notion that poetry requires lofty themes and rarified language; many satire the dry, technical manner in which the genre is often taught, involving rote memorization of forms (which the narrator imagines getting munched by a poem-gobbler whose ingestion of haiku, cinquains, and sonnets require "some onomatopoeia / to cure diarrhea." and that "some readers may wish for flashier visuals than the understated, black-and-white drawings and photos, but others will find inspiration here to declare, like Fletcher's confident your writer, that "poems are not extinct"." Lee Bock in his review for School Library Journal said "what emerges is a picture of a young writer at work, looking closely at the world, making connections, and seeing the depth and beauty of everyday events and people. Ward's black-and-white illustrations use a variety of mediums, including pencil, photography, computer-generated images, and ink. Many aspiring poets will see the reflection of their own creative spirits and aspirations in this lovely collection."
