= Alephonsion Deng =

South Sudanese author and speaker (born 1982)

- Born: c. 1982; Bahr el Ghazal, Sudan
- Occupations: Author, speaker, actor
- Writing career
- Period: 2001–present
- Genres: non-fiction, historical, autobiographical
- Notable works: They Poured Fire on Us From the Sky: The True Story of Three Lost Boys of Sudan; Disturbed In Their Nests
- Website: theypouredfirebooks.com

Alephonsion Deng (c. 1982 - ) is a South Sudanese author and speaker. He is best known as the co-author of the book They Poured Fire on Us From the Sky: The True Story of Three Lost Boys of Sudan, along with his brother Benson, cousin Benjamin and American author Judy A. Bernstein.

In 1999 the Federal government of the United States welcomed Alephonsion as one of the Lost Boys of Sudan. His first job was at Ralph's Grocery Store where he worked for nine months. An opportunity came up to be in a Russell Crowe movie hence he spent six months on the Fox Studios set in Rosarito, Mexico where he learned to sail a tall ship, fire a cannon and sword fight. He has spoken to over 100 schools such as Queens College in Nassau, Bahamas, universities, clubs and organizations about his extraordinary story of survival in Africa, adapting to his life in the United States and his hope for peace in the world. In 2006, Alephonsion made his stage debut in the lead role of Ater in a Mo'olelo production of Mia McCullough's drama Since Africa at San Diego's Diversionary Theatre and now appears in Across Worlds www.WayOfAdventure.org and speaks at schools around the country.

== Awards ==
The two titles Deng has co-written have been the recipient of numerous awards.

They Poured Fire on Us From the Sky: The True Story of Three Lost Boys of Sudan:

- Christopher Award Winner for Adult Books
- The Washington Post Top 100 Books of 2005
- American Library Association "Many Voices" Honoree
- Los Angeles Times Bestseller July 2005.
- American Booksellers Association Book Sense Selection May 2005.
- National Conflict Resolution Center Peacemakers Award
- Book Sense Summer 2006 Paperback Selection
- American Library Association List - Becoming an American
- San Diego Union Tribune Warwick's Top Seller September 2015 (10th Anniversary Edition)

Disturbed in Their Nests

- 2018 Nautilus Gold Award winner, in the category of Multicultural and Indigenous Books
