= Walking Trees =

Book by Ralph Fletcher

Walking Trees: Teaching Teachers in New York City Schools
- Cover of paperback 1995 edition
- Author: Ralph Fletcher
- Publisher: Heinemann
- Publication date: October 1990
- Media type: Print (Paperback)
- Pages: 222
- ISBN: 978-0-435-08536-0
- OCLC: 21442238
- Dewey Decimal: 808/.042/0707471 20
- LC Class: LB1576 .F48 1991

Walking Trees: Teaching Teachers in New York City Schools is a book by Ralph Fletcher. It was first published in 1990. It was published again in 1995 under a slightly different title Walking Trees: Portraits of Teachers and Children in the Culture of Schools.

== Summary ==
Walking Trees: Teaching Teachers in New York City Schools is the story of Ralph Fletcher's introduction to the New York City school system as a teacher trainer in a writing staff development program.

== Reception ==
Brenda Miller Power in her review for Educational Leadership said "Walking Trees is a wonder", she believes that Fletcher has "done a superb job of cataloging in specific ways the difference between a burned-out teacher and a bad teacher" and that "its greatest contribution to our field may be that it helps us begin to ask more of the right kinds of difficult questions". Nancy E. Zuwiyya in her review for Library Journal said that "Fletcher's early encounters often prove frustrating, and his description of a typical uncooperative teacher as a "snarling lump of inertia" will make educators uncomfortable. At the end, Fletcher reveals that not only have the students and teachers learned but he two has acquired a wisdom that he lacked in the beginning." Curriculum Review said that this book was "a funny, hopeful, angry, but most importantly, beautifully written book chronicling one teacher's first year instructing New York City teachers how to teach writing."
