= Fig Pudding =

1995 novel by Ralph Fletcher

- First edition, 1995
- Author: Ralph Fletcher
- Language: English
- Genre: Children's novel
- Publisher: Clarion Books
- Publication date: 1995-04-24
- Publication place: United States
- Media type: Print (Hardcover)
- Pages: 144
- ISBN: 978-0-395-71125-5
- OCLC: 31011230
- LC Class: PZ7.F634 Fi 1995

Fig Pudding is a children's novel written by Ralph Fletcher, first published in 1995. It was recommended as one of the ten best books of 1995 by the American Library Association.

== Plot summary ==
Cliff is twelve years old and the oldest of six children in his family who live in Ballingsford. As Christmas nears, Cliff's grandmother arrives for a visit. Cliff's baby brother is rushed to the hospital with a severe illness. While he is recovering in the hospital on Christmas Eve, his family finally figure out that the "yidda yadda" he has been asking Santa Claus for is a little ladder like the one used to climb up to the top of a bunk bed. The entire family work together to build Josh a ladder and deliver it on Christmas morning. Later, Cliff's first grade brother, Brad, drives his bicycle into an ambulance and dies in the hospital while his family comes to see him. His mother is heart broken when she is told that Brad could not be saved. Brad was buried in his favorite soccer shirt that his mother found and washed and had been crying on. As Brad was being buried, Cliff realized that Brad was gone forever. The family spends the next Christmas at a resort trying to adjust to the loss of Brad but the trip does not seem to work. Their spirits rise during a New Year's party at Aunt Pat's house. When they arrive at the party, Josh accidentally steps into Dad's special fig pudding that they were bringing. Dad removes the shoe, smooths down the pudding, and swears the children to secrecy. They all keep a straight face until Uncle Eddie says that the fig pudding is the best ever and asks Dad if he has added some new ingredient. They all laugh when the real story of the shoe is told.

== Style ==
Fig Pudding is written using an episodic plot style.

== Reception ==
Chris Sherman in his review for Booklist said that "Fletcher captures perfectly the humor, irritations, and sadness of life in a large, close-knit family and makes Cliff a sympathetic and thoughtful narrator, occasionally bewildered by his siblings' antics but always a completely believable older brother. The comedy in the final chapter will leave readers recalling hilarious family disasters of their own." Elizabeth Devereaux in her review for Publishers Weekly said this novel "neatly blends the humor and frustrations of growing up in a large family."
