= Hello, Harvest Moon =

Book by Ralph Fletcher

- Hardcover first edition
- Author: Ralph Fletcher
- Illustrator: Kate Kiesler
- Genre: Children's
- Publisher: Clarion Books
- Publication date: September 22, 2003
- Media type: Print (Hardcover)
- Pages: 32
- ISBN: 978-0-618-16451-6
- OCLC: 50851814
- Dewey Decimal: [E] 21
- LC Class: PZ7.F632115 He 2003

Hello, Harvest Moon is a children's book written by Ralph Fletcher and illustrated by Kate Kiesler. It was first published in 2003 by Clarion Books.

== Plot summary ==
The Moon rises and shines through a girl's bedroom window. It then shines on a silent street, corn and wheat fields, and autumn trees. A young girl and her cat play a game by its light, a pilot flies a plane using its light. The Moon sets in the daylight as the young girl and her cat say goodnight.

== Reception ==
Shawn Brommer in his review for School Library Journal said "Fletcher's poetic prose makes use of gentle tempo and internal rhyme. Imaginative metaphors add to the text; as the Moon sets, it sprinkles "silver coins like a careless millionaire." Careful use of second-person narrative draws readers into the text. Kiesler's luminous oil paintings portray the luscious Moon glow, and a refrained use of brush stroke captures the mystery of nighttime when the familiar world becomes exotic, dazzling, and alive with nocturnal life. Warm hues evoke homey, autumn scenes." Terry Day in her review for Library Media Connection described it as a beautifully written and illustrated book. Publishers Weekly said that "Fletcher's lyrical, child-friendly images will linger in readers' minds. With a gentle nod to Margaret Wise Brown, the child's morning is the moon's setting Ca sleepy head winking/ falling/slow motion/ onto its pillow"), and the book ends appropriately with the girl bidding, "Good night, harvest moon."" Kirkus Reviews said "Fletcher tracks that moon's nocturnal path in language rich in metaphor: "With silent slippers / it climbs the night stairs," "staining earth and sky with a ghostly glow," lighting up a child's bedroom, the wings of a small plane, moonflowers, and, ranging further afield, harbor waves and the shells of turtle hatchlings on a beach. Using creamy brushwork and subtly muted colors, Kiesler depicts each landscape, each night creature from Luna moths to a sleepless child and her cat, as well as the great moon sweeping across star-flecked skies, from varied but never vertiginous angles."
