= Marshfield Dreams =

Memoir by Ralph Fletcher

Marshfield Dreams: When I Was a Kid
- Hardcover first edition
- Author: Ralph Fletcher
- Publisher: Henry Holt and Company
- Publication date: 2005-01-01
- Media type: Print (Hardcover)
- Pages: 193
- ISBN: 978-0-8050-7242-6
- OCLC: 57124494
- Dewey Decimal: 811/.54 B 22
- LC Class: PS3556.L523 Z47 2005

Marshfield Dreams: When I Was a Kid is a memoir written by the American writer, poet and educational consultant Ralph Fletcher, it covers his life from birth to age thirteen when his family moved from Marshfield, Massachusetts to Chicago.

== Summary ==
Each short chapter tells of an incident growing up in a large family on Acorn Street in Marshfield, Massachusetts. Ralph was the oldest of nine children. Some of the stories told were Ralph being informed of his mother's pregnancy by a nosy classmate, his mother's game called "snuck up the rug" where the whole family got down and pulled dirt from the carpets. Other stories include his father bringing home a pet chicken for each child and his great-grandmother who buried the kids' old teeth in the garden.

== Reception ==
Anne O'Malley reviewing the book for Booklist said that "many of the vignettes have a choppy style and a heavy nostalgic tone, but for readers who enjoy imagining what it was like to be a kid in the days of yore, this has a certain charm." Kirkus Reviews said that "this scrapbook of family moments is an amusing, charming and heartwarming memoir about a close family--close in terms of both small house space and their feelings for each other. A snapshot of small-world life that will open readers' eyes to the bonds of a peerless time and simpler lifestyle." Alison Follos was very positive in her review for School Library Journal saying "Fletcher's connection to nature and the environment infuse every aspect of his life. Written with sagacious eloquence and gentle humor, this work stands strong in the ranks of authors' memoirs and autobiographies." Karen Coats reviewing for The Bulletin of the Center for Children's Books said "the short, episodic chapters-really more a sequence of vignettes-don't ask for any significant overlays of emotion or interpretation, so reluctant readers may appreciate the well-told but unobtrusive presentations of ordinary events."
