= Sonia Nazario =

American journalist (born 1960)

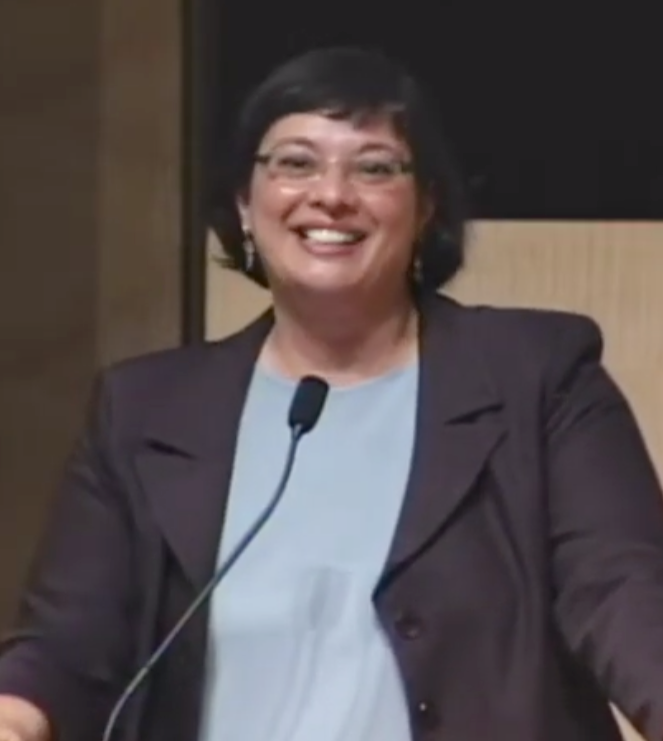
- Speaking at the San Francisco Public Library in 2019
- Born: September 8, 1960 (age 66); Madison, Wisconsin, US
- Education: Williams College; University of California, Berkeley
- Occupation: Journalist
- Awards: Pulitzer Prize for Feature Writing (2003)

Sonia Nazario (born September 8, 1960) is an American journalist mostly known for her work at Los Angeles Times. She has spent her career writing about social and social justice issues, focusing especially on immigration and immigrant children who come to the United States from Central America. In 2003, while working at the Times, she won the Pulitzer Prize for Feature Writing for her six-part series titled "Enrique's Journey," which followed the harrowing story of a young Honduran boy's journey to the US when he was sixteen years old. Enrique's Journey: The Story of a Boy's Dangerous Odyssey to Reunite with His Mother was published as a book in 2006 and became a national bestseller.

== Early life and education ==
Nazario was born in Madison, Wisconsin, but grew up both in Kansas and Argentina. She permanently moved to the United States during the Dirty War in Argentina.

Nazario is a graduate of Williams College and holds a master's degree in Latin American Studies from the University of California, Berkeley. She has received the honorary doctorate from Mount St. Mary's College in 2010, and the honorary Doctor of Humane Letters (L.H.D.) from Whittier College in 2013.

== Career ==
In 1993, Nazario left the Wall Street Journal for a second time and joined the Los Angeles Times to write about social issues, including those dealing with Latinos and Latin America. The following year, she won a George Polk Award for Local Reporting for a series about hunger among schoolchildren in California.

In 1995, the Pulitzer Prize was awarded to the staff of the Los Angeles Times for local reporting of spot news for their 1994 coverage of the first day of the Los Angeles earthquake.

In 1998, Nazario was a finalist for the Pulitzer Prize for Feature Writing for her story about what life was like for the children of drug addicts. Her photographer for the project, Clarence Williams, won the Pulitzer Prize for Feature Photography for photos taken to accompany the story.

In 2002, Nazario finished work on a six-part series, entitled "Enrique's Journey", about the experiences of Latin American children who immigrate to join their parents in the U.S. The newspaper series won more than a dozen national journalism awards, among them the Pulitzer Prize for Feature Writing, the George Polk Award for International Reporting, the Grand Prize of the Robert F. Kennedy Journalism Award, and the National Association of Hispanic Journalists Guillermo Martinez-Marquez Award for Overall Excellence. The story also garnered the Pulitzer Prize for Feature Photography for her accompanying photographer, Don Bartletti.

In 2006, Nazario published a book, Enrique's Journey, which significantly expanded her newspaper series. It became a national bestseller and won two book awards, the 2006 California Book Award silver medal, and the 2007 Christopher Award. It has been published in eight languages and has been adopted by 54 universities and scores of high schools nationwide as their "freshman read" or "all-campus read."

== Activism ==
A year after moving to her mother's native Argentina from Kansas, Nazario and her mother came across a pool of blood on the sidewalk, right at the onset of the country's "Dirty War". She asked her mother about the blood. "The military killed two journalists today, for telling the truth about what's going on here," Nazario recalls her saying. At only 14 years old she decided on the spot that she would become a journalist. She wanted to join those speaking out against injustice.

Nazario began writing stories on children deprived of school breakfast programs or growing up with drug-addicted parents.

Her turning point into becoming a true activist was joining the board of Kids In Need of Defense, a nonprofit which provides legal aid to unaccompanied immigrant children. She then began writing opinion pieces in The New York Times about immigration as well as giving many lectures a year. She continued by testifying before the Senate Foreign Relations Committee and presented a TEDx talk on the subject.
