= Flying Solo (novel) =

1998 book by Ralph Fletcher

- Hardcover first edition cover
- Author: Ralph Fletcher
- Language: English
- Series: Sandpiper
- Genre: Young adult
- Publisher: Clarion Books
- Publication date: 1998-09-21
- Publication place: U.S.
- Media type: Print (Hardcover)
- Pages: 138
- ISBN: 978-0-395-87323-6
- OCLC: 38216537
- LC Class: PZ7.F632115 Fl 1998

Flying Solo is a young adult novel written by Ralph Fletcher, first published in 1998 (first edition).

== Plot ==
On April 28th, Mr. Fabiano, a sixth-grade teacher, is out of school. His substitute teacher calls in sick herself. Due to an administrative error, another substitute is not called. When Mr. Fabiano's class arrives, they discover that their substitute teacher has not arrived. The class decides they will not report this to administration and decide to run the classroom by themselves. The students follow the instructions left by their teacher, and all goes fairly smoothly. The day, spent mostly-unattended, gives the class an opportunity to work out some of their feelings and problems. A major issue in the class is the death of one of the students, Tommy, back in October. At the end of the school day, there is a special assembly during which all of the teachers are supposed to come up onstage. Mr. Fabiano's class is caught when there is no substitute around to go onstage, and they admit to their decision. The novel ends with opinions from the students on whether they did the right thing.

== Characters ==
- Mr. Sal Fabiano — A handsome and beloved sixth grade teacher.
- Rachel White — The de facto protagonist. Rachel has been mute for six months since Tommy died six months earlier, the day after she told him off. She has a major interest in flying and planes.
- Tommy Feathers — An awkward boy, formerly in Mr. Fabiano's class, who died of natural causes six months earlier. He had an extreme crush on Rachel, giving her gifts and making her food, which made her uncomfortable.
- Bastian Fauvell — A sarcastic and rebellious Air Force brat. It's his last day of school before he moves to Hawaii.
- Sean O'Day — A shy boy from a poor family. His father is an alcoholic with a much younger girlfriend. He has a crush on Rachel.
- Karen Ballard — The natural leader of the class who was basically the teacher for the day, also class president.
- Jessica Cooke — The only member of the class that questions the students running the class for the day.
- Christopher Ransom — An obnoxious and spoiled rich boy, that irritates most of the class.
- Missy — Rachel's best friend, who is also overweight and insecure. She usually acts as Rachel's interpreter.
- Rhonda — A sassy girl who is also brave and competitive.
- Sky — An quiet boy from California who is a good surfer.
- John LeClerc — Bastian's best friend, a troublemaker. He was out sick for most of the school day but Bastian "snuck him into" school so they could hang out before Bastian moved.

== Themes ==
Several of the topics explored in the novel include selective mutism, death, and grief.

== Reception ==
Susan P. Bloom in her review for Horn Book Magazine was positive, saying "this kaleidoscopic novel is more thoughtful and poignant than most school stories, while still appropriately leavened with comic moments"; it "demonstrates an utter respect for its characters and its readers, who will appreciate the honest and uncondescending portrayals." Julie Siebecker reviewing for School Library Journal said that "the prose is economical but not sparse, and the characters are developed as sketches rather than in-depth portraits, which helps keep the book moving briskly. Not a must-have but a worthwhile purchase." Nancy J. Johnson in her review for The Reading Teacher said that "Fletcher's characters are realistic and complicated. They rely on the writing lessons Mr. Fabiano taught them to explain, understand and uncover the challenges of growing up and facing independence."
