= The One O'Clock Chop =

2007 novel by Ralph Fletcher

- Hardcover first edition
- Author: Ralph Fletcher
- Language: English
- Genre: Young adult
- Publisher: Henry Holt and Company
- Publication date: 7 August 2007
- Publication place: United States
- Media type: Print (Hardcover)
- Pages: 192 pp
- ISBN: 978-0-8050-8143-5
- OCLC: 77476256
- LC Class: PZ7.F632115 On 2007

The One O'Clock Chop is a young adult novel by written by Ralph Fletcher, first published in 2007.

== Background ==
Ralph Fletcher drew up on own experiences in being a clam digger when he was between seventeen and twenty years old. He considers this his first piece of historical fiction and interviewed many Hawaiian woman as part of the research for this novel.

== Plot summary ==
Matt a fourteen your old boy living on Long Island in 1973 takes a job with Dan a clam digger so that he can earn enough money to buy a used Boston Whaler. Jazzy, Matt's cousin from Hawaii arrives to spend the summer with Matt and his mother. Jazzy and Matt become kissing cousins until Jazzy becomes interested in another boy. They eventually become friends again and Matt learns to stand up for himself.

=== Explanation of the novel's title ===
The One O'Clock Chop is a daily breeze that suddenly moves across the bay where Matt lives roughening up the smooth surface. Dan says "the old salts say you can set your watch by it."

== Reception ==
Publishers Weekly in their review said "Fletcher turns a coming-of-age story into a rich, affecting read." Suzanne Gordon reviewing for the School Library Journal said "plenty of universal teen fascinations and concerns exist for those readers willing to enter Matt's world and give themselves over to this smoothly paced and competently written novel. Kirkus Reviews said "Fletcher's insight into Matt and his boat dreams fly off the page with a solid resonance that will make this a quick, light, summer beach read." James Blasingame in his review for the Journal of Adolescent & Adult Literacy said that "the author captures that tumultuous time period in the mid-teen years when young people are exactly in the middle between being adults and children. Love and hope are always bubbling near the surface in these years, and Matt exemplifies this about as well as a character can."
