= J. Nozipo Maraire =

Zimbabwean writer and doctor (born 1964)

- Born: 1964 (age 61–62); Mangula, Zimbabwe
- Education: Atlantic College; Harvard University; Yale School of Medicine
- Occupations: Neurosurgeon and writer
- Spouse: Allen Chiura
- Children: 4
- Writing career
- Genre: Novel
- Notable works: Zenzele: A Letter for My Daughter, 1996
- Movement: Ecosurgica

J. Nozipo Maraire (born 1964) is a Zimbabwean doctor, entrepreneur and writer. She is the author of Zenzele: A Letter for My Daughter. The novel was published in 1996, was a New York Times "Notable Book of the Year" and a Boston Globe best-seller. It has been published and translated into more than 14 languages.

== Education and career ==
Born in Mangula, Zimbabwe, she is a full-time practising neurosurgeon, and has initiated neurosurgery programs in several institutions in Delaware, Ohio and Oregon. She has travelled, been educated and lived in many countries, including Jamaica, the United States, Canada and Wales. She was selected to attend Atlantic College, in Wales. She received her undergraduate degree from Harvard University and then attended The Columbia University College of Physicians and Surgeons in New York City. She completed her neurosurgery training at Yale School of Medicine. She was awarded a Clinical Fellowship Award by the Congress of Neurological Surgeons, which she used to work with Dr. Fred Epstein in paediatric neurosurgery in New York City.

She is a public speaker who has been invited to lecture at colleges and universities across the world. Dr. Maraire has spoken to numerous book clubs and civic organisations and served on many literary panels, including being an invited guest of the Gothenburg Literary Festival. She has served on the board of directors of several organisations, including The Rotary Foundation, the Ross Ragland Theater and the South North Development Institute. She has worked with and for many development agencies including the World Health Organization, the Norwegian aid agency Norad, and the Synergos Institute. She worked with the Synergos Institute as a consultant and program coordinator and was instrumental in forming community investment funds southern Africa.

In 2010, she was one of the winners of the British Airways Entrepreneur Face to Face Award for her entry of Ecosurgica, her vision for cutting-edge, affordable health care in Southern Africa. She is the founder of Cutting Edge Neurosurgeon Inc., a web-based start-up.

=== Writing ===
Her novel Zenzele: A Letter for My Daughter, published in 1996, was a New York Times "Notable Book of the Year" and a Boston Globe best-seller and has been published and translated into more than 14 languages. As described by Penelope Lively in a 1996 New York Times review: "A Zimbabwean mother writes to her daughter, Zenzele, a Harvard student, telling the story of her life and thus reflecting the upheavals of her country and indeed her continent over the last 30 years or so." Maraire herself said at the time: "Since I've written the book ... I’ve met a lot of young Africans who’ve told me it's the first time they’ve read a book in which they recognize themselves, the generation of children who made the transition from pre-independence to the struggle for independence and the post-independence era, and the ensuing cynicism that inevitably followed. We remember apartheid, when we weren’t allowed to shop in certain stores. ... We’re lost between the traditional African culture and the modern culture. We don’t know how to incorporate them, and there are no role models. The world is so Western, and we want to retain our core identity."

== Personal life ==
She now lives permanently in Zimbabwe. She is married to Allen Chiura, a urologist, also from Zimbabwe, and they have four children.

== Works ==
- Zenzele: A Letter for My Daughter, Phoenix, 1996, ISBN 9781857997736
