= Tommy Trouble and the Magic Marble =

2000 novel by Ralph Fletcher

- Hardcover first edition
- Author: Ralph Fletcher
- Illustrator: Ben Caldwell
- Genre: Children's novel
- Publisher: Henry Holt and Company
- Publication date: 2000
- Media type: Print (Hardcover)
- Pages: 64
- ISBN: 978-0-8050-6387-5
- OCLC: 41951297
- LC Class: PZ7.F634 To 2000

Tommy Trouble and the Magic Marble is a children's novel written by Ralph Fletcher and illustrated by Ben Caldwell. It was first published in 2000.

== Plot summary ==
Tommy, who loves collecting, needs ten dollars to buy a magic marble from another boy. He tries to pick flowers from his mother's prize rose garden to sell to a neighbor, and tries to trade his little brother's snake. Tommy finally decides that the magic marble is not worth the trouble.

== Reception ==
Todd Morning was mixed in his review for Booklist saying that "Today's children may have trouble relating to a story that ends with a game of marbles (does anyone play marbles these days?), but they'll still find lots to enjoy and think about. Ben Caldwell's black-and-white drawings are a plus; they have an angularity that nicely straddles the line between realism and cartoons." Steve Clancy in his review for School Library Journal was not very positive saying that "it's unlikely that this slight story line will hold readers' interest, and while marbles still hold a certain fascination for this age group, they are way down on a list headed by Game Boys and Pokémon cards. Rudimentary black-and-white cartoons capture the characters' moods but occasionally appear out of proportion. Overall, Fletcher's book lacks the humor or adventure of Barbara Park's "Junie B. Jones" series or Mary Pope Osborne's "Magic Tree House" books" The Horn Book Guide to Children's and Young Adult Books was also mixed in their review saying "The story line, like the accompanying line art, seems dated and rather bland, but the relationship between Tommy and his tagalong brother Bradley is appealing."
