= Benson Deng =

Sudanese-born American author (born 1984)

- Born: c. 1984; Bahr el Ghazal, Sudan
- Occupation: Author
- Writing career
- Period: 2001–present
- Genres: Non-fiction, historical, autobiographical
- Notable work: They Poured Fire on Us From the Sky: The True Story of Three Lost Boys of Sudan
- Website: theypouredfirebooks.com

Benson Deng is a South Sudanese-born American writer and one of the Lost Boys of Sudan. He is best known as the co-author of the book They Poured Fire on Us From the Sky (2005), written with his brother Alephonsion Deng, cousin Benjamin Ajak, and Judy A. Bernstein.

When Benson was a seven-years-old member of the Dinka tribe, Sudanese National Islamic militants attacked his village of Juol, Sudan, and he fled with his brother and cousin at the age of five. Wearing only his underwear he, along with thousands of other boys, traveled a thousand miles across Sudan to Ethiopia on foot, without parents, facing crocodiles, yellow fever, chronic hunger and thirst, and militants along the way. Refugee camps which he arrived at like Panyido were already crowded, and contained 50,000 people or more.

In Ethiopia, he learned the English alphabet by writing with his finger in the sand, using limited materials from the UN. He was forced out of Ethiopia when militants attacked the camp that he was staying at very near the border, at the River Gilo. Benson next arrived in Natinga, a rebel army camp. Promised that he would be arriving in a safe camp with education, he was disappointed to see that he was instead led to do manual labor, and fight for the rebel cause. He escaped after his relatives left the camp, in a group of 12 boys. Seeing that people had died while resting in shade after a long trek, he left his resting group and marched alone to safety. He reached Kenya, met his family, and began his education again, but he was soon struck with a serious skin illness. This disease, called River Blindness, made it impossible for him to sit and attend class. So for five years he taught himself English. Lying on his stomach in his hut, he would copy essentials of grammar and vocabulary into his hand-written composition book.

Deng arrived to America on August 9, 2001 and began work at a grocery store. Today he runs the computer digital photography system at Waste Management Corporation in El Cajon, California.

Once in America, his brother and cousin began writing about their experiences. Joni Evans, VP of William Morris, sold their book to Public Affairs. Released on June 13, 2005, it was entitled: They Poured Fire on Us from the Sky: The True Story of Three Lost Boys from Sudan.

== Awards ==
The two titles Deng has co-written have been the recipient of numerous awards.

They Poured Fire on Us From the Sky: The True Story of Three Lost Boys of Sudan:

- Christopher Award Winner for Adult Books
- The Washington Post Top 100 Books of 2005
- American Library Association "Many Voices" Honoree
- Los Angeles Times Bestseller July 2005.
- American Booksellers Association Book Sense Selection May 2005.
- National Conflict Resolution Center Peacemakers Award
- Book Sense Summer 2006 Paperback Selection
- American Library Association List - Becoming an American
- San Diego Union Tribune Warwick's Top Seller September 2015 (10th Anniversary Edition)

Disturbed in Their Nests

- 2018 Nautilus Gold Award winner, in the category of Multicultural and Indigenous Books
