= The Circus Surprise =

Book by Ralph Fletcher

- First edition hardcover
- Author: Ralph Fletcher
- Illustrator: Vladimir Vagin
- Genre: Children's
- Publisher: Clarion Books
- Publication date: 2001-03-19
- Media type: Print (Hardcover)
- Pages: 32
- ISBN: 978-0-395-98029-3
- OCLC: 44926999
- Dewey Decimal: [E] 21
- LC Class: PZ7.F632115 Ci 2001

The Circus Surprise is a children's book written by Ralph Fletcher and illustrated by Vladimir Vagin. It was first published in 2001.

== Plot ==
Nick is taken to the circus as a surprise for his birthday. While at the circus he follows his nose looking for the cotton candy, and when he turns around his parents are gone. A clown on stilts comes to his rescue and puts him on his shoulders and they locating his parents. While they are searching for Nick's parents, the clown has Nick in a small pouch and as they travel he tells Nick to look out at the circus and makes Nick laugh by saying that the lions are kittens and the people were ants.

== Reception ==
Bina Williams in her review for the School Library Journal said "Fletcher details an occurrence that is bound to happen to just about every kid at one time or another--getting lost in a public place. Vagin's gouache pictures vividly portray the details of a circus that is big enough to be interesting but not so big as to be scary." Publishers Weekly was mixed in their review saying "Fletcher's text is by turns reassuring and practical in tone, providing tips that readers will find useful if facing a predicament like Nick's. Vagin's tightly composed gouaches show crowds, but the bustle doesn't come through. While his work is highly detailed (e.g., he finely delineates the lions' fur and manes, and shows the trim on an acrobat's costume), the scenes themselves look stiff and static."
