= Dean Hughes =

American novelist

- Born: August 24, 1943 (age 83); Ogden, Utah, U.S.
- Education: Weber State University; University of Washington (PhD)
- Occupation: Author
- Spouse: Kathleen Hurst Hughes
- Children: 3
- Writing career
- Notable awards: AML Awards (x3)

Dean Hughes (born August 24, 1943) is an American author of historical novels and children's books. He has written 105 books as well as various poems and short stories. As a member of the Church of Jesus Christ of Latter-day Saints, Hughes is a prominent author of LDS fiction for children and juveniles. Many of Hughes's books are sports or war themed. Hughes is most well known for his historical World War II era Children of the Promise series for adults. His novel Midway to Heaven was adapted into a feature-length film in 2011. Before he became a full-time author, Hughes taught English at Central Missouri State University. He taught creative writing at Brigham Young University.

== Biography ==
Dean Hughes was born on August 24, 1943, in Ogden, Utah. After his senior year in high school, Dean Hughes started his first novel; however, the novel was rejected. He attended Weber State University studying English, and received a master's degree in creative writing and a PhD in literature from the University of Washington. Before he became a full-time writer, he taught English at Central Missouri State University for 8 years. Hughes also taught creative writing at Brigham Young University.

In 1979, Dean Hughes published his first book, Under the Same Stars. Since 1979, Hughes has written and published 105 books. Hughes has published poems, books, and short stories for a variety of ages. Much of his writing is targeted to children and young adults (particularly sports-themed and World War II-era books), although he is also well known to adult readers of LDS Fiction for Children of the Promise and Hearts of the Children series, set in World War II and Vietnam War eras respectively. According to Eugene England, Hughes is one of the authors of the fourth and current period of Mormon literature who is credited with writing high quality children's and young adult literature.

In 2001, his World War II novel Soldier Boys was published. In September 2013, Hughes celebrated the publication of his 100th book, Through Cloud and Sunshine. Hughes's 2003 novel, Midway to Heaven, was adapted into a feature-length film of the same title in 2011. This was the first of Hughes's published works to be adapted into a film.

Hughes was the keynote speaker for Brigham Young University-Idaho's Education week in June 2018.

=== Personal life ===
Dean Hughes is married to Kathleen Hurst Hughes and has three children and nine grandchildren. They live in Midway, Utah. Hughes and his wife Kathy served an LDS mission in Nauvoo, Illinois. Hughes is a member of the Church of Jesus Christ of Latter-day Saints.

== Awards ==
In 2005, Hughes won the Smith-Pettit Foundation Award for Outstanding Contribution to Mormon Letters for Children of the Promise. In 2007, Hughes received a Lifetime Achievement award at the inaugural Whitney Awards. In April 2013 he was awarded an Outstanding Achievement AML Award.

He has also received AML Awards for Young Adult Literature (1994) for The Trophy, Novel (1998) for Far from Home, and Novel (2019) for Muddy: Where Faith and Polygamy Collide. He was a finalist or received an honorable mention in 2005 and 2007.

== Bibliography (books only) ==
Bibliographical items are found on the Mormon Literature & Creative Arts website.

=== Fiction series ===
==== Adventures of Young Joseph Williams ====
1. Under the Same Stars (1979) ISBN 0-87747-750-7
2. As Wide as the River (January, 2005) ISBN 0-87747-820-1
3. Facing the Enemy (1982) ISBN 0-87747-928-3

==== Nutty Nutsell ====
1. Nutty for President (February, 1986) ISBN 0-689-30812-4
2. Nutty and the Case of the Ski-Slope Spy (September, 1985) ISBN 0689311265
3. Nutty and the Case of the Mastermind Thief (March, 1985) ISBN 0689310943
4. Nutty Can't Miss (March, 1988) ISBN 0689313195
5. Nutty Knows All (August, 1988) ISBN 0689314108
6. Nutty, the Movie Star (October, 1991) ISBN 0689315090
7. Nutty's Ghost (March, 1993) ISBN 0689317433
8. Re-Elect Nutty! (June, 1995) ISBN 0689318626

==== Hooper Haller ====
1. Hooper Haller (June, 1981) ISBN 0877478678
2. Jenny Haller (1983) ISBN 0877479690

==== Lucky Ladd ====
1. Lucky Ladd #1: Lucky's Crash Landing (October, 1990) ISBN 978-0875791937
2. Lucky Ladd #2: Lucky Breaks Loose (November, 1990) ISBN 978-0875791944
3. Lucky Ladd #3: Lucky's Gold Mine (November, 1990) ISBN 978-0875793504
4. Lucky Ladd #4: Lucky Fights Back (September, 1991) ISBN 978-0875795591
5. Lucky Ladd #5: Lucky's Mud Festival (October, 1991) ISBN 0875795668
6. Lucky Ladd #6: Lucky's Tricks (June, 1992) ISBN 978-0875796550
7. Lucky Ladd #7: Lucky the Detective (July, 1992) ISBN 978-0875796543
8. Lucky Ladd #8: Lucky's Cool Club (October, 1993) ISBN 978-0875797861
9. Lucky Ladd #9: Lucky in Love (October, 1993) ISBN 978-0875798059
10. Lucky Ladd #10: Lucky Comes Home (October, 1994) ISBN 978-0875799414

==== Angel Park All Stars ====
1. Angel Park All-Stars #1: Making the Team (March, 1990) ISBN 0679904263
2. Angel Park All-Stars #2: Big Base Hit (March, 1990) ISBN 0679804277
3. Angel Park All-Stars #3: Winning Streak (May, 1990) ISBN 0679804285
4. Angel Park All-Stars #4: What a Catch! (May, 1990) ISBN 0679904298
5. Angel Park All-Stars #5: Rookie Star (July, 1990) ISBN 0679804307
6. Angel Park All-Stars #6: Pressure Play (August, 1990) ISBN 0679804315
7. Angel Park All-Stars #7: Line Drive (August, 1990) ISBN 0679904328
8. Angel Park All-Stars #8: Championship Game (September, 1990) ISBN 0679804331
9. Angel Park All-Stars #9: Superstar Team (March, 1991) ISBN 0679815368
10. Angel Park All-Stars #10: Stroke of Luck (March, 1991) ISBN 0679915370
11. Angel Park All-Stars #11: Safe at First (April, 1991) ISBN 0679915389
12. Angel Park All-Stars #12: Up to Bat (June, 1991) ISBN 0679915397
13. Angel Park All-Stars #13: Play-Off (June, 1991) ISBN 0679915400
14. Angel Park All-Stars #14: All Together Now (July, 1991) ISBN 0679915419

==== Angel Park Soccer Stars ====
1. Angel Park Soccer Stars #1: Kickoff Time (October, 1991) ISBN 0679815422
2. Angel Park Soccer Stars #2: Defense! (October, 1991) ISBN 0679915435
3. Angel Park Soccer Stars #3: Victory Goal (February, 1992) ISBN 0679926372
4. Angel Park Soccer Stars #4: Psyched! (March, 1992) ISBN 0679926364
5. Angel Park Soccer Stars #5: Backup Goalie (April, 1992) ISBN 0679926380
6. Angel Park Soccer Stars #6: Total Soccer (May, 1992) ISBN 0679826351
7. Angel Park Soccer Stars #7: Shake-Up (September, 1993) ISBN 0679843574
8. Angel Park Soccer Stars #8: Quarterback Hero (August, 1994) ISBN 0679843604

==== Angel Park Hoop Stars ====
1. Angel Park Hoop Stars #1: Nothing But Net (October, 1992) ISBN 0679833730
2. Angel Park Hoop Stars #2: Point Guard (October, 1992) ISBN 0679833749
3. Angel Park Hoop Stars #3: Go to the Hoop! (January, 1993) ISBN 0679934898
4. Angel Park Hoop Stars #4: On the Line (February, 1993) ISBN 0679934901

==== Angel Park Karate Stars ====
1. Angel Park Karate Stars #1: Find the Power (May, 1994) ISBN 0679843590

==== Children Of The Promise ====
1. Children of the Promise, Vol. 1: Rumors of War (June, 1997) ISBN 9781590384459
2. Children of the Promise, Vol. 2: Since You Went Away (October, 1997) ISBN 9781590384466
3. Children of the Promise, Vol. 3: Far from Home (September, 1998) ISBN 1573454060
4. Children of the Promise, Vol. 4: When We Meet Again (November, 1999) ISBN 9781590385883
5. Children of the Promise, Vol. 5: As Long as I Have You (October, 2000) ISBN 9781590385890

==== Scrappers ====
1. Scrappers #1: Play Ball! (March, 1999) ISBN 0689819331
2. Scrappers #2: Home Run Hero (March, 1999) ISBN 0689819250
3. Scrappers #3: Team Player (April, 1999) ISBN 0689819366
4. Scrappers #4: Now We're Talking (May, 1999) ISBN 0689819277
5. Scrappers #5: Bases Loaded (June, 1999) ISBN 0689819382
6. Scrappers #6: No Easy Out (July, 1999) ISBN 0689819293
7. Scrappers #7: Take Your Base (August, 1999) ISBN 0689819307
8. Scrappers #8: No Fear (September, 1999) ISBN 0689819412
9. Scrappers, #9: Grand Slam (October, 1999) ISBN 0689819420

==== Hearts of the Children ====
1. Hearts of the Children, Vol. 1: The Writing on the Wall (October, 2001) ISBN 9781606411728
2. Hearts of the Children, Vol. 2: Troubled Waters (October, 2002) ISBN 9781606411735
3. Hearts of the Children, Vol. 3: How Many Roads? (January, 2003) ISBN 9781606411742
4. Hearts of the Children, Vol. 4: Take Me Home (October, 2004) ISBN 159038332X
5. Hearts of the Children, Vol. 5: So Much of Life Ahead (September, 2005) ISBN 1590384725

==== Come to Zion ====
1. Come to Zion, Vol. 1: The Winds and the Waves (June, 2012) ISBN 9781609070588
2. Come to Zion, Vol. 2: Through Cloud and Sunshine (January, 2013) ISBN 9781609075255
3. Come to Zion, Vol. 3: Fresh Courage Take (May, 2014) ISBN 9781609078737

==== Muddy River ====
1. Muddy: Where Faith and Polygamy Collide (May 2019) ISBN 9781629725857
2. River: Where Faith and Consecration Converge (March 2020) ISBN 9781629727448

=== Standalone Fiction ===
- Honestly, Myron (March, 1982) ISBN 0-689-30881-7
- Switching Tracks (September, 1982) ISBN 0-689-30923-6
- Family Pose (March, 1989) ISBN 0689313969
- Family Picture (March, 1990) ISBN 0590433563
- Lullaby and Goodnight (March, 1992) ISBN 978-0671724054
- Quick Moves (September, 1993) ISBN 0679843582
- End of the Race (October, 1993) ISBN 0689317794
- Jelly's Circus (August, 1986) ISBN 0689713258
- Brothers (January, 1986) ISBN 0875790070
- Theo Zephyr (September, 1987) ISBN 0689313454
- Cornbread and Prayer (June, 1988) ISBN 0875791352
- The Trophy (September, 1994) ISBN 067984368X
- One-Man Team (October, 1994) ISBN 0679954414
- Backup Soccer Star (March, 1995) ISBN 0679854428
- Team Picture (October, 1996) ISBN 0689819900
- Brad and Butter: Play Ball! (March, 1998) ISBN 0679983554
- Soldier Boys (December, 2001) ISBN 0689817487
- Midway to Heaven (2004) ISBN 1590382285
- Search and Destroy (2005) ISBN 9781416953715
- Saboteur: A Novel of Love and War (August, 2006) ISBN 9781590386194
- Before the Dawn (August, 2007) ISBN 9781590387887
- Promises to Keep: Diane's Story (October, 2008) ISBN 9781590389874
- Missing in Action (March, 2010) ISBN 9781442412484
- Home and Away (October, 2015) ISBN 9781629720937
- Four-Four-Two (November, 2016) ISBN 9781481462525
- Displaced (September 2020) ISBN 9781534452329
- One Last Joy Ride (May, 2022) ISBN 9781639930197

=== Non-fiction ===
- The Mormon Church: A Basic History (1986) ISBN 0875790143
- Baseball Tips Book (February, 1993) ISBN 0679936424
- Great Stories from Mormon History (with Tom Hughes) (1994) ISBN 0875798497
- All Moms Go To Heaven (2005) ISBN 9781609082109
- The Cost of Winning: Coming in First Across The Wrong Finish Line (2008) ISBN 9781590389102
