= I Am Wings =

Book by Ralph Fletcher

I Am Wings: Poems About Love
- Hardcover first edition
- Author: Ralph Fletcher
- Publisher: Atheneum
- Publication date: 1994-03-01
- Media type: Print (Hardcover)
- Pages: 48
- ISBN: 978-0-02-735395-2
- OCLC: 29428630
- Dewey Decimal: 811/.54 20
- LC Class: PS3556.L523 I18 1994

I Am Wings: Poems About Love is a young adult book of poetry by Ralph Fletcher, it was first published in 1994. It was chosen by School Library Journal as one of their best books of 1994.

== Summary ==
The book contains thirty-one free verse poems about love arranged into two sections, "Falling In" and "Falling Out". The poetic voice is that of a young male and the poems trace the development of a relationship from the beginning with the first poem "First Look" through its demise with the last poem "Seeds".

== Reception ==
Nancy Vasilakis in her review for Horn Book Magazine said that "The poems, which are easily accessible to younger adolescents, are a good bet for reluctant readers. They will strike home with most teenagers, who'll recognize the feelings expressed here and will appreciate a volume of poetry written entirely in their own language." Patti Sylvester Spencer in her review for The Book Report said "Fletcher's language invites thought through accessible metaphors and meaningful situations relevant to toe contemporary youth." Judy Greenfield in her review for School Library Journal said that "while this book tells a story that has been told before, it does so with fresh images and without clichés." Susan Helper in her review for Reading Today said that "Fletcher deftly captures the kinds of discoveries adolescents make, their tentative explorations of unfamiliar emotions, and the quickness that their emotions change. Rachel E. Schwedt and Janice DeLong in their book Young Adult Poetry said this about the poems, "all are masterfully written and nearly take away the breath of anyone who has ever been in love. These responsive poems are certain to draw passionate discussion and possibly unlock real creative writing among young adults."
