= Sam Swope =

American writer

Sam Swope is an author and the 2006 Thurber House children's writer in residence.

Works by Swope include I Am a Pencil: A Teacher, His Kids, and Their World of Stories, a memoir recounting three years Swope spent teaching writing students at a Queens, New York, public school.

I Am a Pencil won a 2005 Christopher Award, a Books for a Better Life Award, The Bechtel Prize, and was "named one of the best books of 2004 by Publishers Weekly."

Swope has reviewed books for the New York Times.

== Books ==
- I Am a Pencil: A Teacher, His Kids, and Their World of Stories; ISBN 978-0-8050-7851-0
- The Araboolies of Liberty Street; ISBN 978-0-374-30390-7
- The Krazees; ISBN 978-0-374-44090-9
- Gotta Go! Gotta Go!; ISBN 978-0-374-42786-3
- Jack and the Seven Deadly Giants; ISBN 978-0-374-33670-7
