= Twilight Comes Twice =

1997 book by Ralph Fletcher

- Hardcover first edition
- Author: Ralph Fletcher
- Illustrator: Kate Kiesler
- Genre: Children's
- Publisher: Clarion Books
- Publication date: 1997-10-20
- Media type: Print (Hardcover)
- Pages: 32
- ISBN: 978-0-395-84826-5
- OCLC: 36066032
- Dewey Decimal: [E] 21
- LC Class: PZ7.F634 Tw 1997

Twilight Comes Twice is a children's book of free verse written by Ralph Fletcher and illustrated by Kate Kiesler. It was first published in 1997 and describes the transitions from night to day and from day to night.

== Reception ==
Publishers Weekly said in their review: "In spite of the commanding beauty of the language and art, however, the book engages the reader's emotions only minimally. Rather than invite the reader to be a direct participant in the experience itself, the text, is written in the second person, seems to ask the audience to stand in awe of an adult's ruminations. There are distinct pleasures to be had here, but they are chiefly cerebral." Virginia Golodetz reviewing for the School Library Journal said "the personification of dawn and dusk seems strained, and the metaphors are sometimes more distracting than illuminating, e.g., dusk "pours/the syrup of darkness/into the forest" and "hisses on the sprinklers." The pictures speak more clearly than the words."
