= The Sandman (children's book) =

Book by Ralph Fletcher

- Cover of hardcover first edition
- Author: Ralph Fletcher
- Illustrator: Richard Cowdrey
- Genre: Children's
- Publisher: Henry Holt and Company
- Publication date: 2008-05-27
- Media type: Print (Hardcover)
- Pages: 32
- ISBN: 978-0-8050-7726-1
- OCLC: 85017990
- Dewey Decimal: [E] 22
- LC Class: PZ7.F634 San 2008

The Sandman is a children's book written by Ralph Fletcher and illustrated by Richard Cowdrey. It was first published in 2008 by Henry Holt and Company.

== Plot summary ==
Tor is an inches tall man who can not fall asleep no matter what he tries. He discovers a dragon scale while walking in the woods. He learns that the powder made by grinding the scale induces sleep. He then travels sprinkling the sand into the eyes of sleepless children.

== Reception ==
Ian Chipman in his review for Booklist said "Fletcher’s spin on the classic character responsible for suddenly leaden lids is helped along by Cowdry’s quaint, deeply hued artwork." He described the book as "charming and comforting bedtime tale." Kirkus Reviews said "Fletcher's fantasy narrative fleshes out the familiar trope by combining worlds of fairy-tale-forest settings with average household bedtime environments. Cowdrey's deeply colored acrylics of flora, fauna, one frightfully greenish and nostril-smoking dragon, workshop scenes and angelically dozing children alternate with black-and-white images of a cherubic dimple-chinned bald and white mustachioed tiny gentleman hard at work." Lauralyn Persson in her review for School Library Journal said "Fletcher's smoothly written story flows in a thoroughly plausible way and is beautifully served by Cowdrey's vibrant acrylic paintings. All in all, this is a compelling story with pictures that add drama, charm, and atmosphere."
