= Moving Day (poetry collection) =

- Hardcover first edition
- Author: Ralph Fletcher
- Illustrator: Jennifer Emery
- Publisher: Boyds Mills Press
- Publication date: November 2006
- Media type: Print (Hardcover)
- Pages: 40
- ISBN: 978-1-59078-339-9
- OCLC: 64207967
- LC Class: PZ7.F634 Mov 2006

Moving Day is a young adult book of poetry by Ralph Fletcher, illustrated by Jennifer Emery. It was first published in 2006.

== Summary ==
Thirty-four short free verse poems that express the feelings of a twelve-year-old boy moving from Massachusetts to Ohio. Some of the topics include packing, the discovery of long-lost treasures, giving things away, and doing things one last time.

== Reception ==
Kirkus Reviews said "The poet leaves pretension at the moving-van door and gives readers a real feel for the evocative emotions of a regular kid--and that regular kid was Fletcher himself. Emery's accompanying watercolor illustrations are like flashes of family history viewed through hand-swiped frost on windows of memory. They are simple, but they speak volumes. A fine collection." Mary Jean Smith in her review for School Library Journal said that "like shards of glass, Emery's pencil drawings with their watercolor washes mirror the loss and longing in these poems." and she describes the book as "excellent in relation to other titles on the same subject or in the same genre" Sylvia M. Vardell in her book Poetry People said that "the poems are loosely connected one to another to reveal the grieving process of separating from the familiar and slowly establishing new roots in a new place." and that "this collection is a reassuring voice for children who are dealing with one of life's most challenging transitions."
