= Grandpa Never Lies =

Book by Ralph Fletcher

- Hardcover first edition
- Author: Ralph Fletcher
- Illustrator: Harvey Stevenson
- Genre: Children's
- Publisher: Clarion Books
- Publication date: October 2000
- Media type: Print (Hardcover)
- Pages: 32
- ISBN: 978-0-395-79770-9
- OCLC: 40305587
- Dewey Decimal: 811/.54 21
- LC Class: PS3556.L523 G72 2000

Grandpa Never Lies is a children's book written by Ralph Fletcher and illustrated by Harvey Stevenson. It was first published in 2000.

== Plot summary ==
A young girl describes her special relationship with her grandfather over four seasons. The Grandfather tells imaginative tales in response to her questions. Each tale is followed by her refrain of "And Grandpa never lies, so I know it's so". Then Grandma suddenly dies and the little girl and her grandfather mourn together.

== Reception ==
Alicia Eames reviewing for the School Library Journal said that "the lyrical language and engaging use of imagery are worth noting. Richly hued acrylic illustrations complement the mood of the text moving smoothly from bright and fanciful to dark and somber. Suitable for read-alouds, but perhaps even better for sharing individually." Lauren Peterson reviewing for Booklist said "despite the death, this is an upbeat, joyous story of an intergenerational relationship that will strike a chord with many children. Stevenson's acrylic pictures are done in an appealing painterly style, with obvious brushstrokes and interesting use of color and line."
