= Enrique's Journey =

2006 book by Sonia Nazario

- Author: Sonia Nazario
- Genre: Nonfiction
- Publisher: skid
- ISBN: 978-0-8129-7178-1 (English edition, hardback)
- OCLC: 77617402
- Dewey Decimal: 305.23089/687283073 B 22
- LC Class: E184.H66 N397 2007

Enrique's Journey: The Story of a Boy's Dangerous Odyssey to Reunite with his Mother was a national best-seller by Sonia Nazario about a 17-year-old boy from Honduras who travels to the United States in search of his mother. It was first published in 2006 by Random House. The non-fiction book has been published in eight languages, and is sold in both English and Spanish editions in the United States. A young adult version was also published in 2013. The young adult version was published in Spanish in July 2015.

The book was based on a Pulitzer Prize-winning series of articles written in 2002 by Sonia Nazario for the Los Angeles Times.

== Background ==
Nazario spent nearly five years reporting about migrants in Nuevo Laredo. She spent time shadowing him there and hearing about his remarkable trip north. Nazario reconstructing on and writing Enrique's Journey. After doing months of research, she met the book's Enrique, a then 16-year-old illegal immigrant, at a shelter fructed Enrique's dangerous trek from Honduras to the U.S. by making the same 3,000-mile round-trip journey, much of it on top of 7 freight trains, up the length of Mexico. She then retraced his journey a second time. Each trip took three months.

Nazario has continued to cover Central American migration and unaccompanied minors in her opinion column for The New York Times, and to post other coverage of unaccompanied minors making the journey north on her website.

== Don Francisco Presenta Reunion ==
Enrique's family was reunited on a Spanish-language talk show produced by Univision called Don Francisco Presenta hosted by Don Francisco.

Sonia Nazario joined Enrique and his mother, Lourdes, to discuss Enrique's Journey and what happened after the newspaper series was published. In the episode, Lourdes said through tears that it had been 17 years since she has seen her daughter Belky, who remained in Honduras. Don Francisco then announces that he got a visa for Belky to visit, and he calls for her to come out.

Lourdes stands to meet her and they embrace, both sobbing. Enrique stands and wraps his arms around his mother and sister, and the three of them embrace as the audience cheers. Lourdes is heard telling Sonia that she didn't know this was going to happen.

== Recognition ==
The series of Los Angeles Times articles that was the genesis of the book won more than 20 journalism awards, including the Pulitzer Prize for Feature Writing.

Don Bartletti won the Pulitzer Prize for Feature Photography for the photographs he took for the Los Angeles Times series, which are also featured in the book.

Enrique's Journey has won both the 2007 Christopher Award and the 2006 California Book Award in Recognition of Literary Excellence, Silver Medal. It has been adopted by over 100 universities as their freshman or common read. In 2015, it was one of the most popular choices for a common read, according to a survey by Inside Higher Ed.

In 2014, Enrique's Journey was listed as number one on a list of the top ten best non-fiction books on The Latino Author.

Enrique's Journey has been chosen as a common or freshman read by over 200 middle schools, high schools, and universities nationwide. Facing History & Ourselves developed a six-week unit teaching guide to accompany the young adult version of the book.

== Sonia Nazario ==
Sonia Nazario has since become an advocate for unaccompanied minors who face immigration court alone. In 2019, a record number of unaccompanied minors were detained at the southern border of the U.S. Nazario has been on the board of Kids in Need of Defense (KIND) since its inception. The nonprofit was started by Angelina Jolie and the Microsoft Corporation in 2008. On July 17, 2014, she testified before the U.S. Senate Foreign Relations Committee about the violence children were fleeing in Central America, in places like Enrique's former neighborhood on Honduras. Nazario has since been a contributing op-ed writer for The New York Times. Her articles focus on immigration, asylum, Central America and Mexico, often revisiting Enrique's neighborhood in Honduras for further reporting.

== See also ==
- Freighthopping
- Unaccompanied minor
