= Ralph Fletcher =

American writer (born 1953)

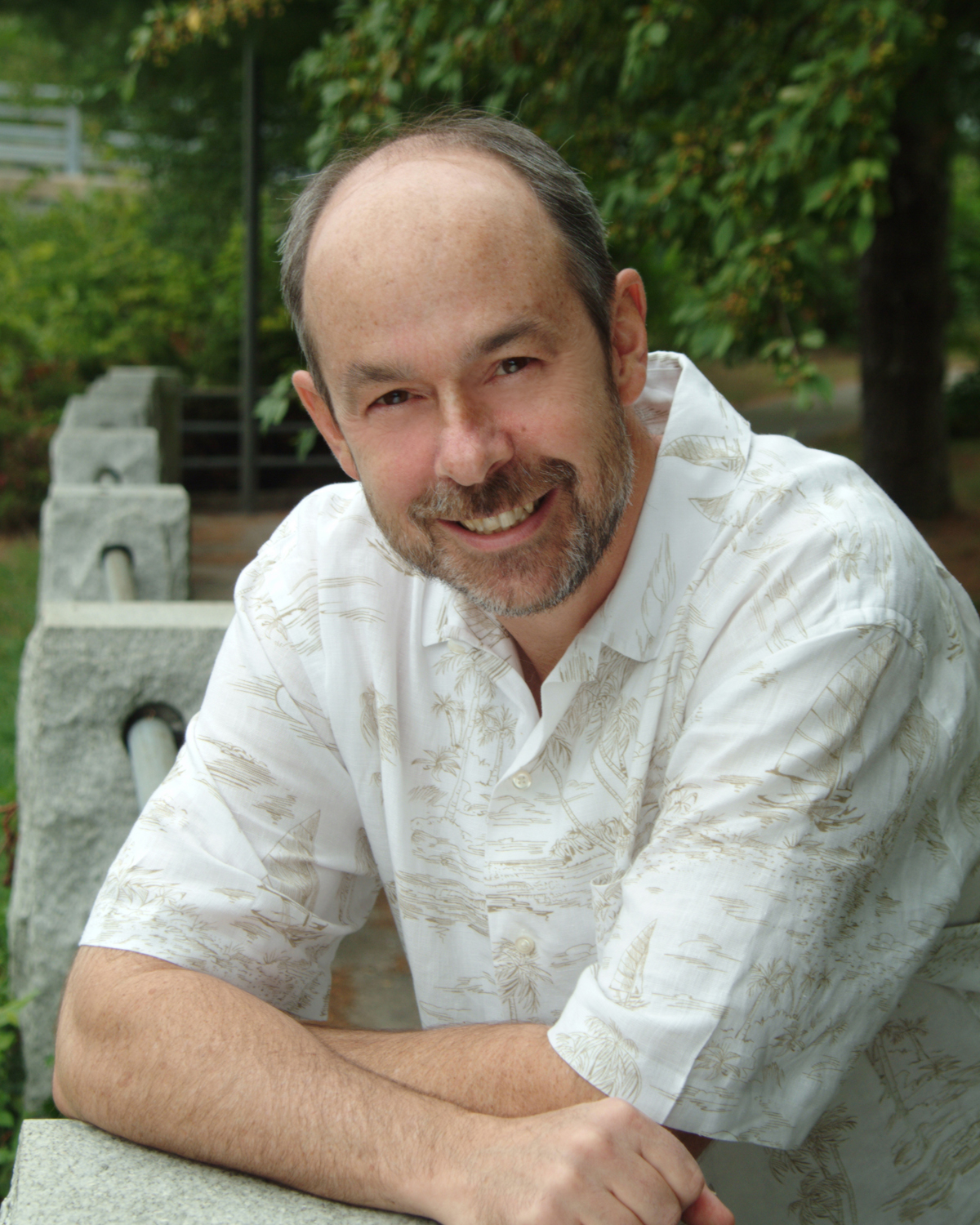
- Born: March 17, 1953 (age 73); Marshfield, Massachusetts, U.S.
- Occupations: Young adult novelist; poet; children's book author; educational consultant
- Spouse: JoAnn Portalupi
- Website: ralphfletcher.com

Ralph Fletcher (born March 17, 1953) is an American writer of children's picture books, young adult fiction, and poetry. He is also an educational consultant, and author of books for both children and professional educators on the art of writing.

== Biography ==
Ralph Fletcher was born and raised in Marshfield, Massachusetts. He is the oldest of 9 children. Each of his parents was one of eight children. He received his B.A. degree from Dartmouth College in 1975 and his M.F.A degree in writing from Columbia University in 1983. In college, he participated in foreign study programs in Tonga in the South Pacific and Sierra Leone, South Africa. After receiving his master's degree, he worked in New York City classrooms as part of the Teacher College writing project. Fletcher currently lives in the vicinity of Durham, New Hampshire. He is married to JoAnn Portalupi with whom he has collaborated on several professional educator books. Together they have four sons.

== Awards ==
His young adult novel Uncle Daddy won a Christopher Medal in the Books for Young People, ages 10–12 category in 2002. Fig Pudding, a young adult chapter book by Fletcher, was recommended as one of the ten best books of 1995 by the American Library Association. Fletcher's poetry book I Am Wings was chosen by School Library Journal as one of their best books of 1994.

== Writer's Notebook ==
In 1996, Ralph Fletcher wrote the book "Breathing In, Breathing Out; Keeping A Writer's Notebook". Although this book is geared towards an adult audience, it contributes a better understanding for educators of how to keep a writer's notebook and instill the values within Writer's Workshop for children. Fletcher writes that "keeping a notebook may be the single best way to survive as a writer." This book provides examples of situations in which Fletcher personally used his writer's notebook for himself to cope, jot down story starters, write poems, let out rage or frustrations, or simply a place to unleash all that was on his mind. The purpose of this book is to allow people to see the value of having a writer's notebook and allowing it to be "a quiet place to catch your breath and begin writing." Fletcher provides samples from his own writer's notebook throughout the book to provide a better example of what a writer's notebook truly is.

== Bibliography ==
=== Children's picture books ===
- Twilight Comes Twice - illustrated by Kate Kiesler (1997)
- Grandpa Never Lies - illustrated by Harvey Stevenson (2000)
- The Circus Surprise - illustrated by Vladimir Vagin (2001)
- Hello, Harvest Moon - illustrated by Kate Kiesler (2003)
- The Sandman - illustrated by Richard Cowdrey (2008)

=== Poetry books ===
- The Magic Nest (1980)
- Water Planet (1991)
- I Am Wings (1994)
- Ordinary Things: Poems from a Walk in Early Spring (1997)
- Buried Alive: The Elements of Love (1998)
- Room Enough for Love (1998) - Compilation of I Am Wings and Buried Alive
- Relatively Speaking: Poems about Family (1999)
- Have You Been to the Beach Lately? (2001)
- A Writing Kind of Day (2005)
- Moving Day (book) (2007)

=== Novels and memoir ===
- Fig Pudding (1996)
- Flying Solo (1998)
- Spider Boy (1997)
- Tommy Trouble and the Magic Marble (2000)
- Uncle Daddy (2001)
- Marshfield Dreams: When I Was a Kid (2005) Memoir
- The One O'Clock Chop (2007) Young adult
- Also Known As Rowan Pohi (2011) Young adult
- Marshfield Memories: More Stories About Growing Up (2018) Memoir

=== Professional educator books ===
- Walking Trees (1991)
- What a Writer Needs (1993)
- Breathing In, Breathing Out: Keeping a Writer's Notebook (1996)
- Craft Lessons: Teaching Writing K-8 (with JoAnn Portalupi) (1998)
- Nonfiction Craft Lessons (with JoAnn Portalupi) (2001)
- Writing Workshop (with JoAnn Portalupi) (2001)
- Teaching the Qualities of Writing with JoAnn Portalupi (2004)
- Lessons for the Writer's Notebook with JoAnn Portalupi (2005)
- Boy Writers: Reclaiming Their Voices (2006)
- Pyrotechnics on the Page (2010)
- Mentor Author, Mentor Texts (2012)
- What a Writer Needs, 2nd edition (2013)

=== Books on writing for children ===
- A Writer's Notebook (1996)
- Live Writing (1999)
- How Writers Work (2000)
- Poetry Matters (2002)
- How to Write Your Life Story (2007)
- Reflections: Author at Work (2007)
- Guy-Write: What Every Guy Writer Needs to Known (2012)
