= Beatrice's Goat =

2001 picture book by Page McBrier

- Cover of the book
- Author: Page McBrier
- Illustrator: Lori Lohstoeter
- Language: English
- Publisher: Aladdin Paperbacks
- Publication date: 2001
- Pages: 40
- ISBN: 978-0-689-82460-9

Beatrice's Goat is a 2001 children's story book based on the true account of Beatrice Biira, an impoverished Ugandan girl whose life is transformed by the gift of a goat from the nonprofit world hunger organization Heifer International. The picture book, written by Page McBrier and illustrated by Lori Lohstoeter, shows how the arrival of the goat sustains the family, and allows Beatrice to achieve her dream of attending school.

In an afterword, Hillary Clinton writes, "Beatrice’s Goat is a heartwarming reminder that families, wherever they live, can change their lives for the better." A portion of the proceeds from the sale of the book support Heifer International.

The book received a Christopher Award and made Tennessee's Volunteer State Book Award Master List.

The true account was covered by 60 Minutes in 2005.

Beatrice Biira graduated from Connecticut College in 2008.
