= Spider Boy (novel) =

Book by Ralph Fletcher

- Hardcover first edition
- Author: Ralph Fletcher
- Genre: Young adult
- Publisher: Clarion Books
- Publication date: 1997-04-14
- Media type: Print (Hardcover)
- Pages: 183
- ISBN: 978-0-395-77606-3
- OCLC: 35029741
- LC Class: PZ7.F634 Sp 1997

Spider Boy is a young adult novel written by Ralph Fletcher, first published in 1997.

== Plot summary ==
Bobby Ballenger is starting a new school a thousand miles from his old home. He moved from Naperville, Illinois, to New Paltz, New York, and his interest in spiders has earned him the nickname of Spider Boy from Illinois given to him by the class bully. His pet tarantula has not eaten since the family moved which has made him nervous about its health. Bobby keeps a journal where he records interesting facts about spiders and then uses it to record his frustrations and realizations about his new school.

== Reception ==
Elizabeth Watson in her review for Horn Book Magazine said that "while accessible and fast-moving, the book is not lightweight; it deals head on with problems such as the bully who deliberately kills one of Bobby's pet tarantulas, a cheating incident, and the question of forgiveness. Although the book is somewhat didactically programmed, Bobby remains a sympathetic protagonist, realistic in his imperfections." Adele Greenlee in her review for School Library Journal was mixed saying that "the use of spiders in Bobby's journal and in the plot is a unique unifying theme of this novel. However, the character development is less successful. It takes awhile for readers to care about Bobby. The supporting characters are stereotypes (bully, understanding teacher, confident older sister). The story moves slowly and is limited in intensity until a final crisis. The resolution is predictable but upbeat. Bobby finds a niche for his unique interests, new friends with whom to play football, and a teensy bit of romance."
