= The Lemon Tree: An Arab, a Jew, and the Heart of the Middle East =

2006 book by Sandy Tolan

The Lemon Tree: An Arab, a Jew, and the Heart of the Middle East (2006) is a non-fiction book by Sandy Tolan. It deals with the Israel-Palestine conflict and follows two narratives which intersect, showing the complex history of the conflict in the lives of the individuals and society as a whole. The book was Booklist’s Editor’s Choice for best adult non-fiction book in 2006, and won a Christopher Award in 2007.

== Content ==
In The Lemon Tree, Tolan tells the stories of Dalia Eshkenazi Landau, an Israeli, and Bashir Khairi, a Palestinian. Both individuals lived in the same house in al-Ramla, with the Khairi family fleeing their home during the 1948 Arab–Israeli War, and the Eshkenazi family moving into their vacated house. The book follows the family's histories in the context of the wider conflict, leading up to the meeting of Bashir and Dalia. It then follows both of them as their friendship develops despite being on opposites sides of the conflict, and provides historical context and analysis of world events. When Dalia's parents die, she turns the house into a center for Arab-Jewish dialogue, as well as a day care center for Arab children at Bashir's request.

== Reception ==
Jeremy Pressman writes that the book "concisely presents multiple Arab-Israeli perspectives and enlivens the history and infuses it with both broader and deeper meaning." Kathleen Kern writes that "Tolan provides a balance I have seen in no other source... [he] never glosses over the fact that Dalia has choices that Bashir does not... However, the fact that a committed Zionist and a committed Palestinian resistance leader have kept up a relationship over the recent years of spiraling violence is significant." Kirkus Reviews called the book a "sensitively told, eminently fair-minded narrative." Carol Gilbert writes that the book "is a must read for anyone interested in the Middle East, in conflict resolution or just plain drawn to true stories that depict two equally valid but contrasting views of reality." The book has been noted for being thoroughly researched, and including 65 pages of notes.

Max Webb, blogging on The Times of Israel's blog platform, says "This book does many things well... I found it eye-opening and refreshing." However, he also says "the Jewish side of this story is not fleshed out... Dalia’s story is too closely tied to Europe, to the Holocaust. The indigenous nature of Zionism and the age-old Jewish longing for Zion that spans diverse Jewish communities across the globe is hardly emphasized." But with his caveats, he still says he "would recommend this book to anyone who wants to learn more about the Israeli-Palestinian conflict."
