= Uncle Daddy =

2001 book by Ralph Fletcher

- First hardcover edition
- Author: Ralph Fletcher
- Genre: Young Adult
- Publisher: Clarion Books
- Publication date: April 1, 2001
- Media type: Print (Hardcover)
- Pages: 144
- ISBN: 978-0-395-87323-6
- OCLC: 38216537
- LC Class: PZ7.F632115 Fl 1998

Uncle Daddy is a young adult novel written by Ralph Fletcher, first published in 2001. It was awarded a Christopher Medal in the Books for Young People, ages 10–12 category in 2002.

== Plot summary ==
Rivers's father abandoned his wife and son when the son is three years old, he goes out to get a pizza and does not come back. His mother's uncle moves in and becomes "Uncle Daddy". Rivers is living a fairly typical life for a nine-year-old boy when his father returns after a six-year absence. The return of Rivers's father threatens to tear the family apart until Uncle Daddy suffers a near fatal heart attack. Rivers and his parents come together to support Uncle Daddy.

== Reception ==
Roger Sutton in his review for Horn Book Magazine said that "Rivers's narration is open and vulnerable, and readers will feel a ready empathy, not to mention a wish for an Uncle Daddy of their own." Heide Piehler said in her review for School Library Journal that this novel will "appeal to readers who want an alternative to the grim realism of much contemporary fiction." Carol Otis Hurst in her review for Teaching Pre K-8 said that "this short novel is a tear-jerker and Uncle Daddy is almost too good to ring true, but the plot survives -- and so does Uncle Daddy. Rivers' father has some reasons but no excuses for abandoning his family and their anger is realistically presented." Nancy Johnson in her review for The Reading Teacher said that "Ralph Fletcher's realistic relationship between adults is convincing while the hero status imposed by Rivers on his great-uncle provides a child's perspective of a relative who went beyond the common familial relationships to provide a safe and secure environment for loved ones."

== Awards ==
Uncle Daddy was awarded a Christopher Medal in the Books for Young People, ages 10–12 category in 2002.
