= Soldier X =

Book by Don L. Wulffson

SoldierX
- Cover of SoldierX: depicting the swastika and a boy wearing a Russian fur hat
- Author: Don L. Wulffson
- Language: English (German at points)
- Genre: World War II
- Publisher: Penguin USA
- Publication date: December 2002
- Publication place: United States
- Media type: Print (hardback and paperback
- Pages: 227 pp

Soldier X is a young adult war drama book written by Don Wulffson about a half-German and half-Russian boy named Erik Brandt who joins the Wehrmacht, Hitler's army, during World War II. The book tells about the war from the perspective of Erik Brandt as he leads a life as both a German and a Russian, as well as the ways in which war can affect a person.

The book won the 2002 Christopher Award for books for young adults, and was on the 2002 National Council for the Social Studies list of notable books for young readers.
