= They Poured Fire on Us from the Sky =

2005 book by Benson and Alephonsion Deng

They Poured Fire on Us From the Sky: The True Story of Three Lost Boys of Sudan
- Author: Judy A. Bernstein; Alephonsion Deng; Benson Deng; Benjamin Ajak
- Language: English
- Genre: Memoir
- Publication date: 2005
- ISBN: 978-1586482695

They Poured Fire on Us From the Sky: The True Story of Three Lost Boys of Sudan (2005) is a book co-authored with Judy A. Bernstein. It is the autobiographical story of brothers Benson Deng and Alephonsion Deng, and their cousin Benjamin Ajak. It describes their ordeal during the Second Sudanese Civil War as they flee as refugees across Sudan, Ethiopia, and Kenya before arriving at a refugee camp in Kenya. There they sign up to take part in the Lost Boys of Sudan program and resettle in America.

== Editions ==
- Hardcover, first edition (2005). ISBN 978-1586482695
- Paperback (2006). ISBN 978-1586483883
- Audiobook, Audible.com (2009).
