= Buried Alive: The Elements of Love =

- Hardcover first edition
- Author: Ralph Fletcher
- Publisher: Atheneum
- Publication date: April 1996
- Media type: Print (Hardcover)
- Pages: 46
- ISBN: 978-0689805936
- OCLC: 32779111
- Dewey Decimal: 811/.54 20
- LC Class: PS3556.L523 B87 1996

Buried Alive: The Elements of Love is a young adult book of poetry by Ralph Fletcher, with photographs by Andrew Moore. It was first published in 1996.

== Summary ==
This book is a collection thirty six free verse poems about teenage love divided into four elements: earth, water, air, and fire.

== Reception ==
Marjorie Lewis in her review for School Library Journal said that "the poetry, the inviting pages, the metaphor of the arrangement, the romantic situations and the mysterious photo-collages is, in its complexity, a step above the works of Mel Glenn and Gary Soto. Joan B. Elliott and Mary M. Dupuis recommended this book for use in the classroom in their book Young Adult Literature in the Classroom.
