= Don L. Wulffson =

Don L. Wulffson (born 1943 in Los Angeles, California) is the author of over 40 books, including Soldier X and Before Columbus: Early Voyages to the Americas.
