= Ordinary Things: Poems from a Walk in Early Spring =

1997 book of poetry by Ralph Fletcher

- Hardcover first edition
- Author: Ralph Fletcher
- Illustrator: Walter Lyon Krudop
- Publisher: Atheneum
- Publication date: 1997-04-01
- Media type: Print (Hardcover)
- Pages: 48
- ISBN: 978-0-689-81035-0
- OCLC: 34244644
- Dewey Decimal: 811/.54 20
- LC Class: PS3556.L523 O73 1997

Ordinary Things: Poems from a Walk in Early Spring is a young adult book of poetry by Ralph Fletcher, illustrated by Walter Lyon Krudop. It was first published in 1997.

== Summary ==
The book is a collection of thirty three poems divided into three sections titled "Walking", "Into the Woods", and "Looping Back". The reader is taken on a walk along a road, through the woods, over a stream, and back.

== Reception ==
Brooke Selby Dillon in her review for Book Report said "yet despite the editing carelessness and the prosaic nature of some of the poems, Fletcher has used enough imagery, alliteration, and meter to keep the reader journeying along with the speaker, reaching ahead for just one more poem. Lines such as "...voices and voltage/sing through its wires" roll pleasurably off the tongue, and images such as apple trees, which are "old gnomes/half-hidden in the mist" excite the imagination." Karen Morgan in her review for Booklist said "In Fletcher's poetry, observations on ordinary things reveal more complex thoughts and emotions. The poems in this collection would make strong choices for reading aloud throughout the year. Younger listeners might marvel, as Fletcher does in "Birds' Nests," when his grandmother throws some of his freshly cut hair on the ground outside so that later the hair could be "woven into a bird's wild tapestry." Older readers may understand the desire to look for arrowheads while out walking: to "hold one in my hand / I want to touch the tip of history."" Rachel E. Schwedt and Janice DeLong in their book Young Adult Poetry said that "the simple language makes the poems accessible, while the astute reflections encourage an awareness of the importance of everyday things that we take for granted."
