= Relatively Speaking: Poems About Family =

- Hardcover first edition cover
- Author: Ralph Fletcher
- Publisher: Scholastic
- Publication date: 1999-03-01
- Media type: Print (Hardcover)
- Pages: 48
- ISBN: 978-0-531-30141-8
- OCLC: 39498578
- Dewey Decimal: 811/.54 21
- LC Class: PS3556.L523 R45 1999

Relatively Speaking: Poems About Family is a young adult book of poetry by Ralph Fletcher, illustrated by Walter Lyon Krudop. It was first published in 1999.

== Summary ==
The youngest boy describes both his family and their life together through verse. Various scenes include how the family prepare corn on the cob, his other brothers accident, the family reunion, his rarely seen cousin, and his uncle's funeral.

== Style ==
Relatively Speaking: Poems About Family has been described as a novel-in-verse.

== Reception ==
Kristen Oravec said in her review for School Library Journal that "the selections are striking in their simplicity, universal themes, and realistic voice. Pen-and-ink line drawings detail items ranging from a favorite quilt to a water bucket and sponge used to wash the car. Ultimately, these pieces connect throughout the book and show how individuals mesh to become a family." Rachel E. Schwedt and Janice DeLong in their book Young Adult Poetry said that "in a day when the family is struggling to find identity and purpose as a unit, Fletcher and Krudop have provided the missing piece for readers of all ages and of all families in this keepsake of a book."
