= Fred Epstein =

American pediatric neurosurgeon (1937–2006)

Fred J. Epstein (July 26, 1937 – July 9, 2006) was an American pediatric neurosurgeon credited for the development of pioneering neurosurgical techniques to treat children threatened by brain and spinal-cord tumors.

== Education ==
Born in Yonkers, New York, he graduated from New York University and New York Medical College. He did his internship and surgical residency at Montefiore Medical Center in the Bronx and his neurosurgical residency at New York University-Bellevue Hospital Center, while serving in the Army reserves, under the tutelage of Joseph Ransohoff.

== Career ==
In 1983, he was named professor of neurosurgery at New York University (NYU) and two years later director of the division of pediatric neurosurgery by Ransohoff, his former mentor. It was there that he saw the resemblance of operable tumors in the cerebellum and, until then, inoperable ones in the brain stem. He likened the technique he developed to removing lead from a pencil, the pencil being the spinal cord.

He founded the division of pediatric neurosurgery at New York University Medical Center, and he was the founding director of the Institute for Neurology and Neurosurgery (INN) at Beth Israel Hospital in New York City.

He was president of the International Society of Pediatric Neurosurgery and the American Society of Pediatric Neurosurgery. He published more than 175 scholarly papers and was editor in chief of The Journal of Pediatric Neurosurgery.

In 2001, the American Association of Neurological Surgeons awarded him its Lifetime Achievement Award.

He wrote two books for general readers: "If I Get to Five" and "Gifts of Time".

He was the subject of three segments of “20/20” and made news by operating on the son of the Yankee pitcher Tommy John and on a Tibetan monk for whom the Dalai Lama prayed at the institute. In 1997, he operated on a millionaire's pug in exchange for a donation to help pay for surgery that Epstein then performed on a 5-year-old boy from rural Pennsylvania.

In September 2001, he suffered a brain injury due to a bicycle accident, which forced him to retire from active practice. He continued to advise on neurological matters for the Miami Children's Hospital until his death due to melanoma.

== Quotation ==
The question, "Why do children suffer?" has no answer, unless it's simply, "To break our hearts." Once our hearts get broken, they never fully heal. They always ache. But perhaps a broken heart is a more loving instrument. Perhaps only after our hearts have cracked wide open, have finally and totally unclenched, can we truly know love without boundaries.
